= Sculpture on the Gulf =

Biennial sculpture exhibition on Waiheke Island, New Zealand

Coordinates: 36.7839°S 174.9826°E

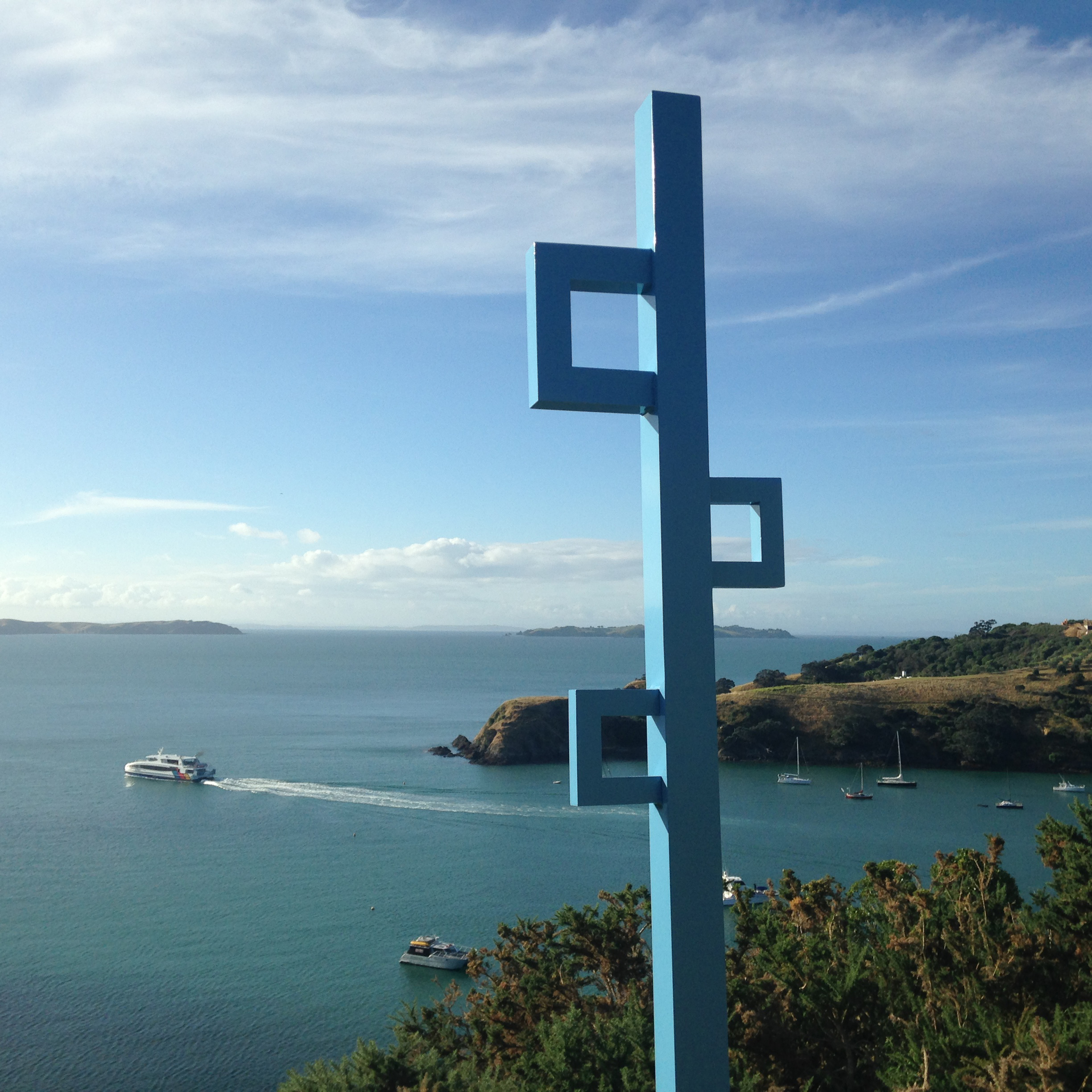
Detail from Shannon Novak's Medley Part I – XIII exhibited in Sculpture on the Gulf 2015

Sculpture on the Gulf is a temporary outdoor art exhibition on a coastal headland on Matiatia Bay, Waiheke Island, New Zealand. It is a biennial event founded in 2003 by the Waiheke Community Art Gallery.

== History and format ==
At the first event in 2003, there were two awards made: a "People’s Choice" and a "Premier" award. At artists' request the Premier award was discontinued in 2005 and a fee to each artist paid instead. A Premier award was reinstated in 2013 and 2015, but at the request of artists abandoned in 2017.

By 2009 the exhibition took place over three, rather than two weeks, and included a programme for schools.

Sculpture on the Gulf resumed in March 2022 after a break due to COVID restrictions.

"Waiheke Island’s biennial Sculpture on the Gulf exhibition charts [New Zealand's] own rising interest in outdoor sculpture trails. In 2003, the first year it was held, the event attracted 12,000. Numbers attending rose to 32,000 in 2011, and 40,000 in 2017."

Many notable New Zealand artists have exhibited, over the years, in the biennial event, their works displayed along a 2 kilometre track that runs around Te Whetumatarau Point. Exhibiting artists have included Paul Dibble, Leon van den Eijkel, Phil Price, Brit Bunkley, Neil Dawson, Fatu Feu'u, Peter Nicholls, Terry Stringer, Paratene Matchitt, Peter Lange, Denis O’Connor, Graham Bennett, Gill Gatfield, Veronica Herber, Regan Gentry, Konstantin Dimopoulos, Suji Park, Ioane Ioane, Tiffany Singh, Brett Graham, Sriwhana Spong and Chris Bailey.

== Events ==
Events
Year	Date	Curators	Artists	Notes
2003	24 January – 9 February	Tim Walker (Selection Judge); Greg Burke (Selection Judge)	Gregor Kregar and Glen Spencer; Jeff Thomson; Tracy Adams; Paul Dibble; Barry Lett; Aaron Te Rangiao; Monique Vette; Virginia King; James Webster; Fatu Feu'u; Cathryn Monro; Phil Price; Aiko Groot; Neil Dawson; Enid Eiriksson; Lyndal Jefferies	The first exhibition of 27 art installations in what would become a major New Zealand biennial art event was held on a 2.5 km trail.
2005	28 January – 13 February	Jackie O'Brien (Artistic Director); Lara Strongman (Curator); Lisa Reihana (Curator); Chris Saines (Curator)	Jeff Thomson; Richard Wedekind; David McCracken; Aiko Groot; Chiara Corbelletto; Paul Rhind; Sean Burke; David Carson; Suza Lawrence; Phil Price; Sharonagh Montrose; Denis O'Connor; Sara Givins; Peter Nicholls; Tui Hobson; Regan Gentry; Gregor Kregar; Barry Lett; Waikarere Gregory; Terry Stringer; Jim Wheeler; Paratene Matchitt; Paul Dibble; Liz Earth; Peter Lange	25 art installations
2007	26 January – 11 February	Jackie O’Brien (Artistic director); Priscilla Pitts (Director, Dunedin Public Art Gallery); Brett Graham (artist and teacher); Gregory O’Brien (curator Wellington City Art Gallery, writer)	Denis O’Connor / Bob Orr (poet); Lyonel Grant (represented by John Leech Gallery); Meiling Lee; Charlotte Fisher; Lilly Rhind: (Born in 1995, Lilly is likely to be the youngest artist to ever exhibit in SOTG.); Tania Patterson; Suza Lawrence; David McCracken; Karin Strachan; Phil Price; Steve Woodward; Pauline Rhodes; Leon van den Eijkel; Sharonagh Montrose; Emily Pauling; Phil Newbury; Kazu Nakagawa; Morgan Jones; Peter Stoneham; Julia Oram; Paratene Matchitt; Brit Bunkley; Tony Bond; Virginia King; Konstantin Dimopoulos; Jeff Thomson	26 site responsive installations
2009	23 January and 15 February	Jenny Harper; Helen Kedgley (Senior curator of Contemporary Arts, Pataka Museum of Arts and Cultures, Porirua); Justin Paton	Graham Bennett; Tony Bond; Lucy Bucknall; Paul Cullen; Charlotte Fisher; Graham Fletcher; Gill Gatfield; Chris Hargreaves; Robert Jahnke; Gaye Jurisich; Meiling Lee; Nic Moon; Stephen Mulqueen; Kazu Nakagawa; Christian Nicolson; Louise Palmer; Louise Purvis; Paul Radford; Pauline Rhodes; Brydee Rood; Graham Snowden; Serene Thain; Jeff Thomson; Fletcher Vaughan; Leon van den Eijkel; Richard Wedekind	26 site responsive installations
2011	28 January – 20 February	Juliet Monaghan (Director )	Matt Akehurst; Diane Atkinson; Chris Bailey; Ali Bramwell; Julie-Anna Child/Peter Mrost; Chiara Corbelletto; Paul Cullen; Judy Darragh/Rachel Shearer; Scott Eady; John Edgar; Gina Ferguson; Stuart Forsyth; Marcel Grosse; Mia Hamilton; Verena Jonker/Bryony Matthew; Virginia King; Gregor Kregar; Peter Lange; Suza Lawrence; David McCracken; Shane McGrath; Chris Meder; Kazu Nakagawa; Christian Nicholson; Brett Oakes; Denis O’ Connor; Grant Palliser; Phil Price; Paul Radford; Christina Read; Timothy Sang; Duncan Sargent; A D Schierning; Marcus Tatton; Roger Thompson; Jeff Thomson; Leon van den Eijkel; Fletcher Vaughan; Ruth Watson; Carolyn Williams	40 site responsive installations
2013	25 January – 17 February	Nansi Thompson (Artistic director); John Gow (Chair); Sue Gardiner; Lara Strongman; Rhana Devenport (Judge)	Delicia Sampero; Matthew Muir; Terry Stringer; Konstantin Dimopoulos; Veronica Herber; Ray Haydon; Carolyn Williams; Anthony Cribb; Fatu Feu’u; Gina Ferguson; Jeff Thomson; Jonathan Organ, Jessica Pearless; Peter Lange; Phil Price; Kazu Nakagawa; Glendale Rangihaeata; Aaron McConchie; Gregor Kregar; Nic Moon; Christian Nicolson; David McCracken; Matt Akehurst; Sharonagh Montrose; Bev Goodwin; Graham Bennett; Sarah Brill; David Carson; Regan Gentry; Matt Ellwood; Trish Clarke	30 site responsive installations. Ranked in the New York Times’ Top 46 places to go in the world. 45,000 people visited the exhibition.: Lexus Premier Award: Prize $20,000: Pavilion Structure by Gregor Kregar.; Fuller's People's Choice Award: Prize $10,000. Pavilion Structure by Gregor Kregar.; Two Westpac/Gen-i Merit Awards: Prize $10,000 each: Catwalk by Kazu Nakagawa. Field Notes by Carolyn Williams.; Parsons Brinckerhoff Award for Engineering Excellence: Prize $5,000: Portrait of Traction and Transmission by David McCracken
2015	23 January – 15 February	Jackie O’Brien (Artistic coordinator): Kate Darrow; Sue Gardiner; Karl Chitham; Derrick Cherrie (Judge)	* Nigel Jamieson and Imersia Ltd: Christian Nicolson; Shannon Novak; James Wright; Denis O’Connor; John Hurrell; Matt Ellwood; Scott Eady; Robert Jahnke and Joshua Campbell; Elin&Keino; Virginia King; Richard Maloy; Stuart Bridson; Veronica Herber; Audrey Boyle; Xin Cheng and Chris Berthelsen; Brydee Rood; Tony Bond; Anah Dunsheath; Tania Patterson; Angus Muir and Alexandra Heaney; Cushla Donaldson; Sharonagh Montrose and Helen Bowater; Suji Park; Seung Yul Oh; Paul Radford; Jane and Mario Downes; Jeff Thomson; Ioane Ioane; David McCracken; Lonnie Hutchinson	31 site responsive installations: Lexus Premier Award: Prize $30,000: The Precariats by Cushla Donaldson.; Fuller's People's Choice Award: Prize $10,000.Target by James Wright.
2017	27 January – 19 February	Zara Stanhope; Linda Chalmers; Blair French (Director Curatorial and Digital, Museum of Contemporary Art Australia); Bruce Phillips (Senior Curator, Te Tuhi); Kelly Carmichael	Phil Price; Richard Maloy; Jim Speers and Guo Xixuan; Paul Cullen; Jon Hall; Anton Parsons; Paora Toi-Te-Rangiuaia; Virginia King; Dion Hitchens; David McCracken; Veronica Herber; Ioane Ioane; Maureen Lander & the Kaihanga Kara Collective; Robert Jahnke; Chris Booth; Tiffany Singh; Brett Graham; Shannon Novak & Rimana Jones; Jae Kang; Denis O’Connor; Sriwhana Spong; Chris Bailey; Natalie Guy; Michel Tuffery; Olivia Webb; Matt Ellwood; Kazu Nakagawa & Helen Bowater; Jeff Thomson; Semisi Fetokai Potauaine; Paul Dibble; Dane Mitchell; Martin Awa Clarke Langdon; Jeremy Leatinu’u; Gregor Kregar	34 site responsive installations: Invited Artist: George Rickey: Three Squares Gyratory, Variation 2 (1971); Invited Architects: The Gateway: Designers: Nicholas Stevens and Gary Lawson. Originally commissioned as the New Zealand entry for the Venice Architecture Biennale in 2012 but unrealised.; Fuller's People's Choice Award: Phantom Fleet by Virginia King.; Exhibiting artists:
2019	1 – 24 March	Reuben Friend; Jackie O’Brien; Dr Zara Stanhope, Abby Cunnane, Melanie Oliver (Other curators involved)	Jon Hall; James Wright; Virginia King; Brit Bunkley and Andrea Gardner; Sally Smith; Robert Jahnke; Phil Price; Shannon Novak; Natalie Guy; Shelley Simpson; Ngahina Hohaia; Sharonagh Montrose; Tyler Jackson; Leon van den Eijkel; Kazu Nakagawa; Anton Forde; James Russell; Kereama Taepa; David McCracken; Tim Barlow; Mandy Cherry Joass; Kauri Hawkins; Brydee Rood; Chris Bailey; Euan Lockie; Jeff Thomson; Jae Kang; Elliot Collins	28 site responsive installations
2022	4 – 27 March	Nigel Borell; Rachel Yates; Dr Kriselle Baker; Fiona Blanchard	Melissa Laing; Kereama Taeapa; Jonas Raw; Tyler Jackson; Aiko Groot; Denis O'Connor; Louise McCrae; Lang Ea; Brit Bunkley; Andrea Gardner; Jorge Wright; Ioane Ioane; Johl Dwyer; Julie Moselen; Margaret Feeney; Sally Smith; Natalie Guy; Chris Moore; Francisco Carbajal; Janine Williams; Virginia Leonard; Te Rongo Kirkwood; Martin Basher; James Cousins; Wanda Gillespie; Kazu Nakagawa; Salome Tanuvasa; Anton Forde; Debbie Fish; Jane Downes	30 site responsive installations.

== Gallery ==
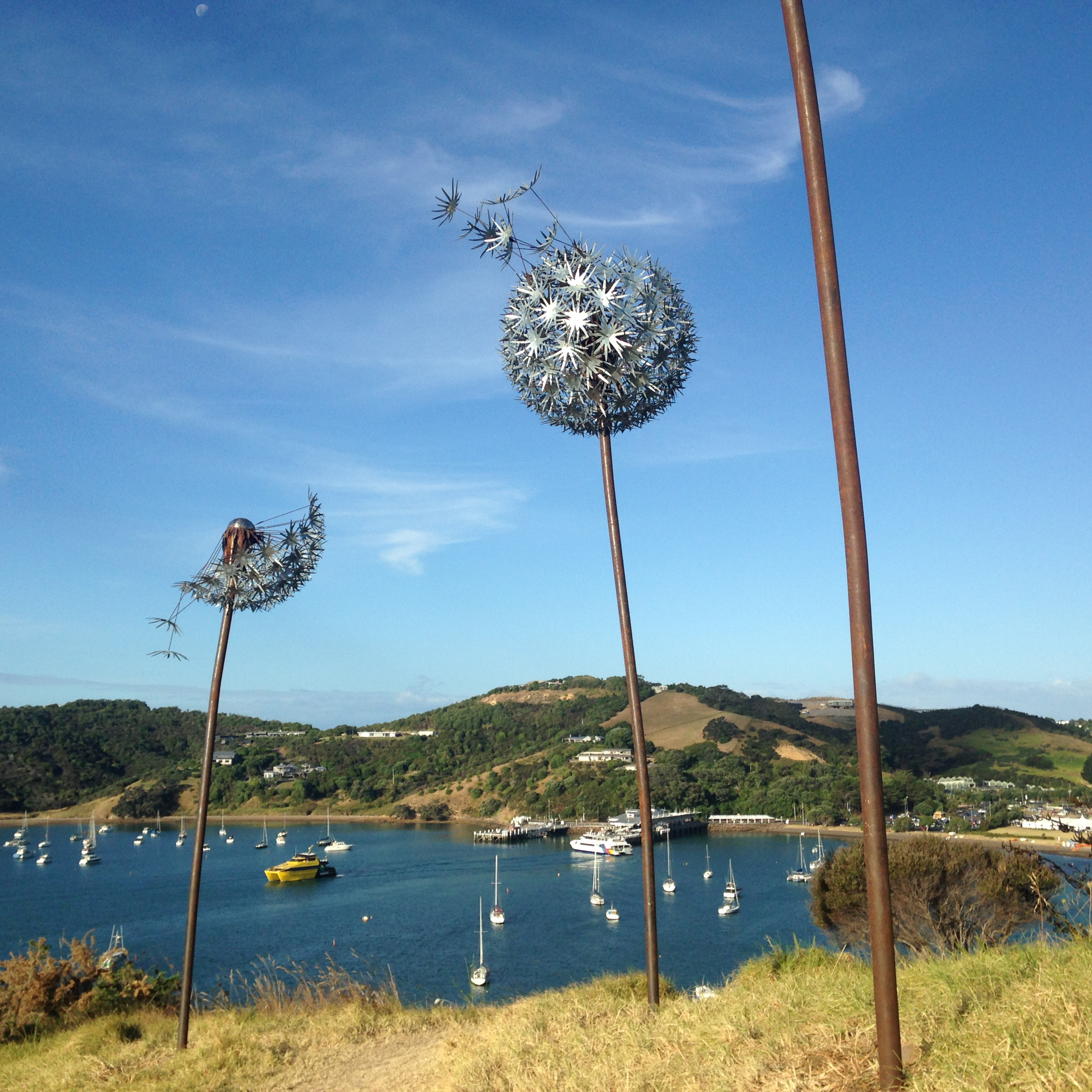
Work by Jane and Mario Downes, Sculpture on the Gulf 2015

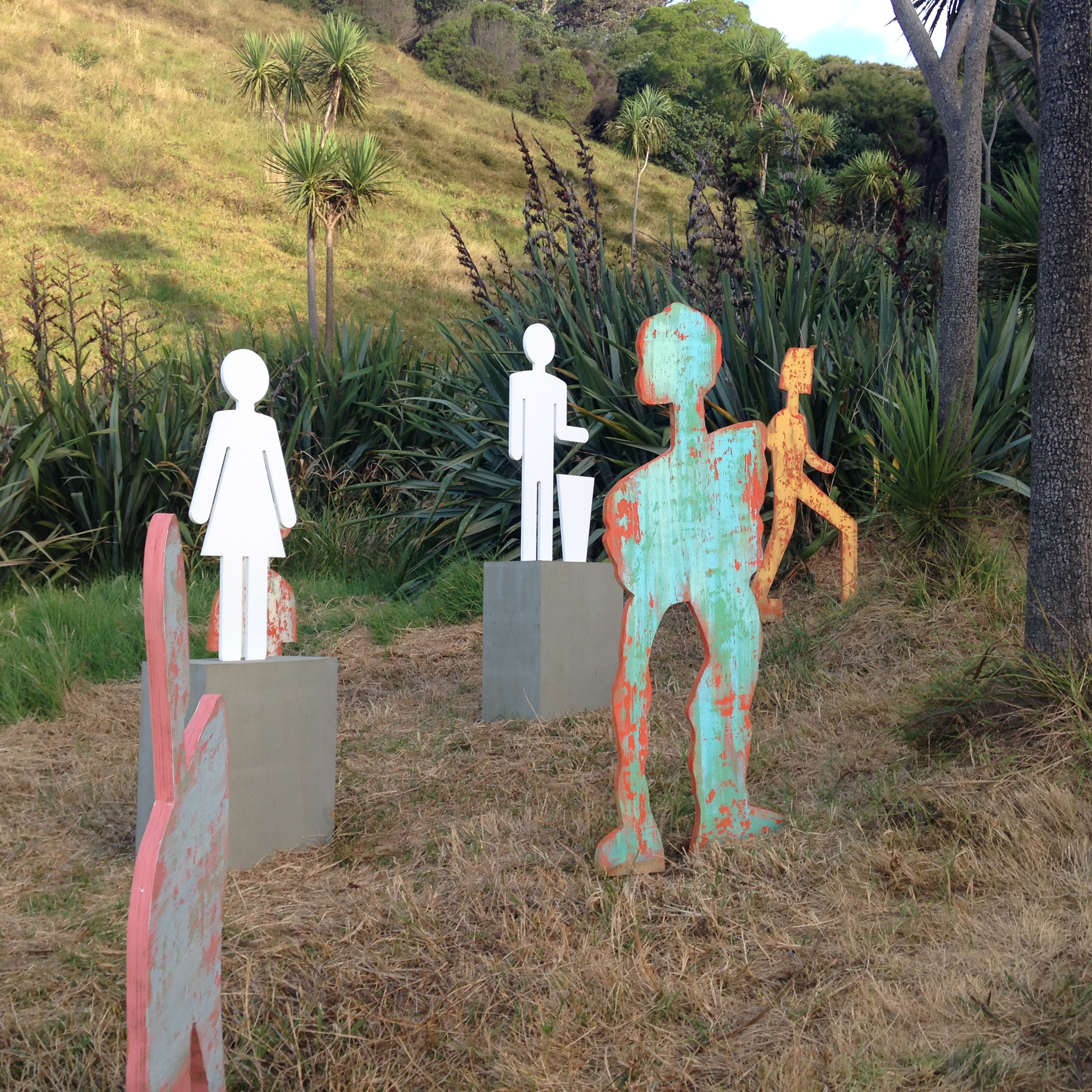
Detail from Paul Radford's Sculpture Walk, exhibited in Sculpture on the Gulf 2015

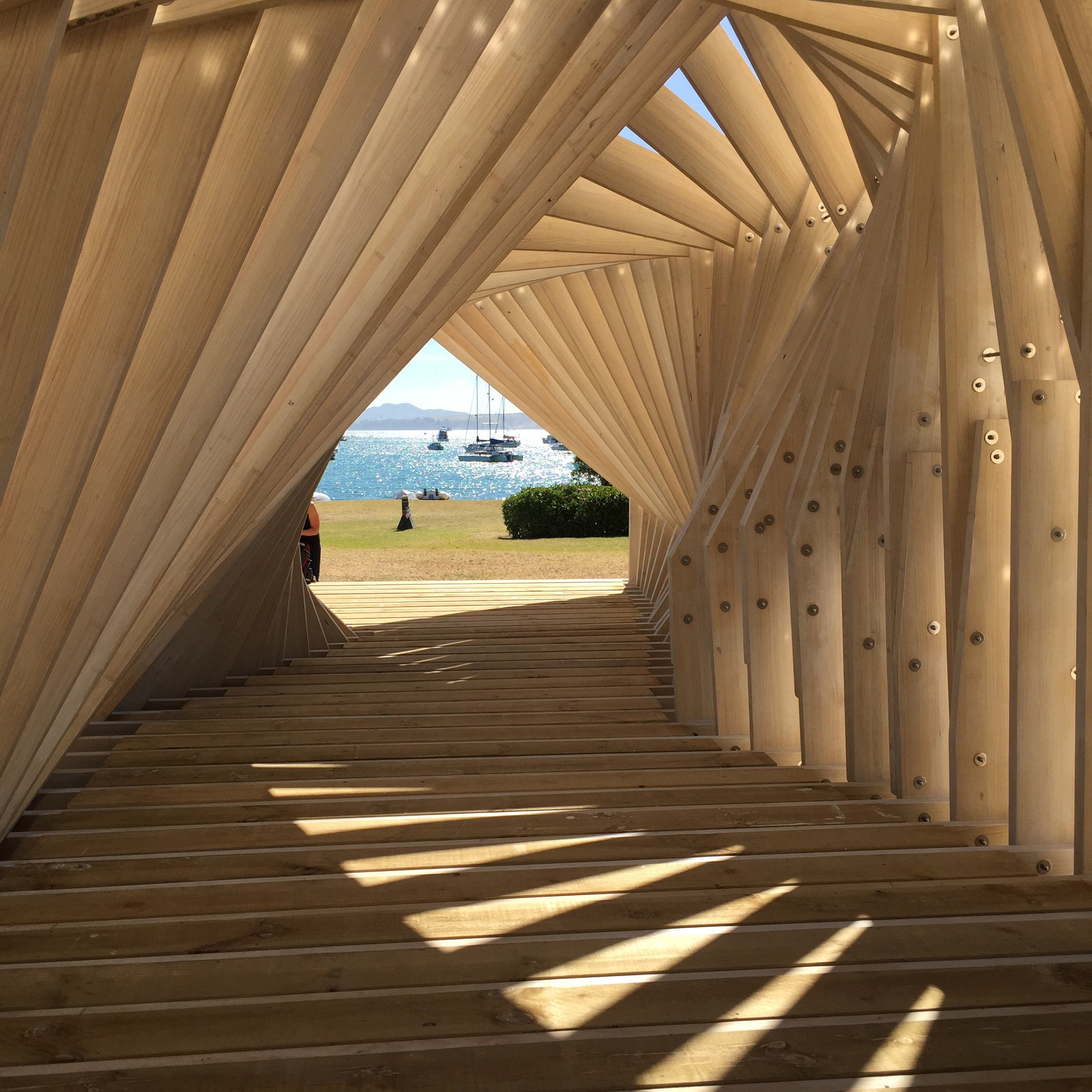
'The Gateway' by Nicholas Stevens and Gary Lawson

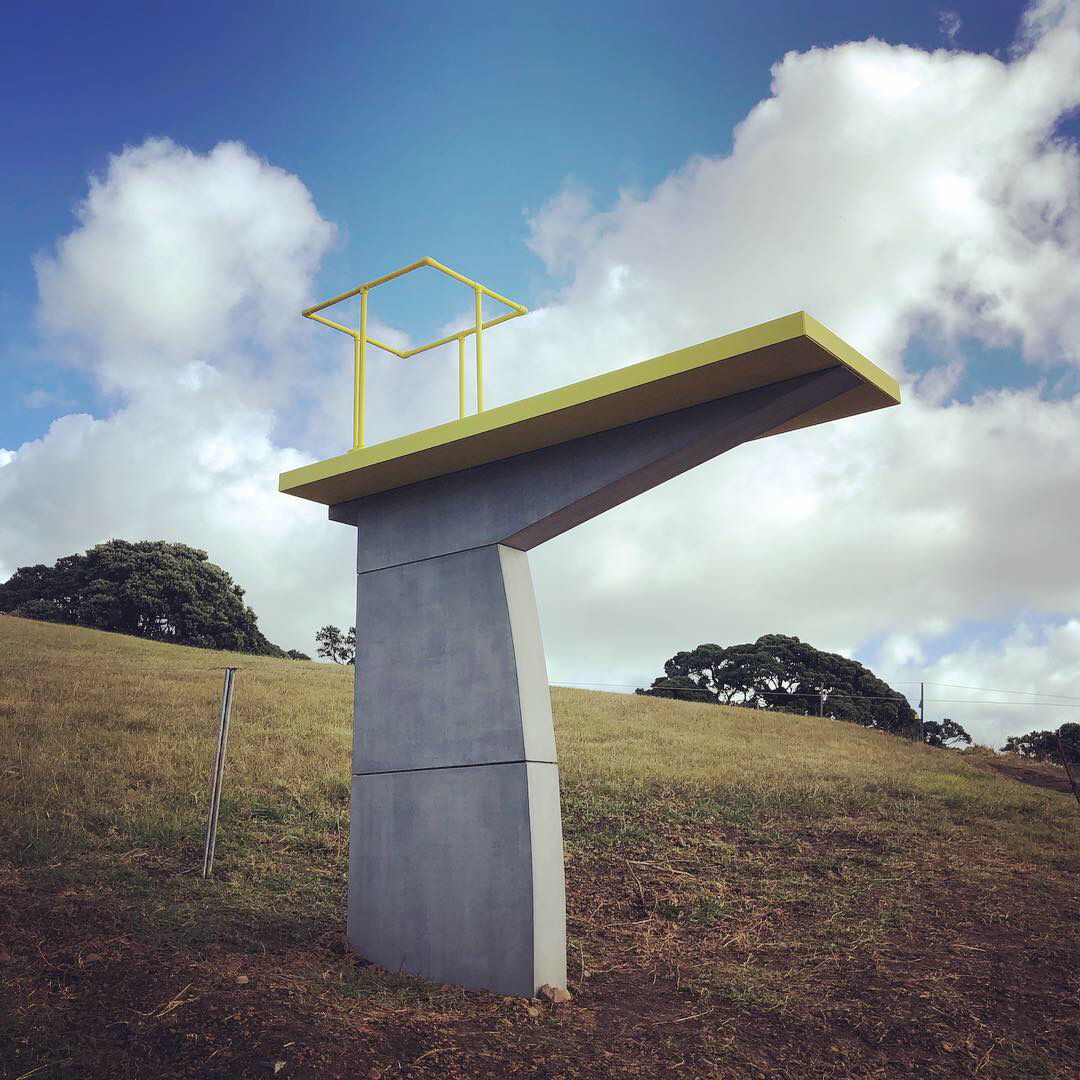
The Pool by Natalie Guy, Sculpture on the Gulf 2019

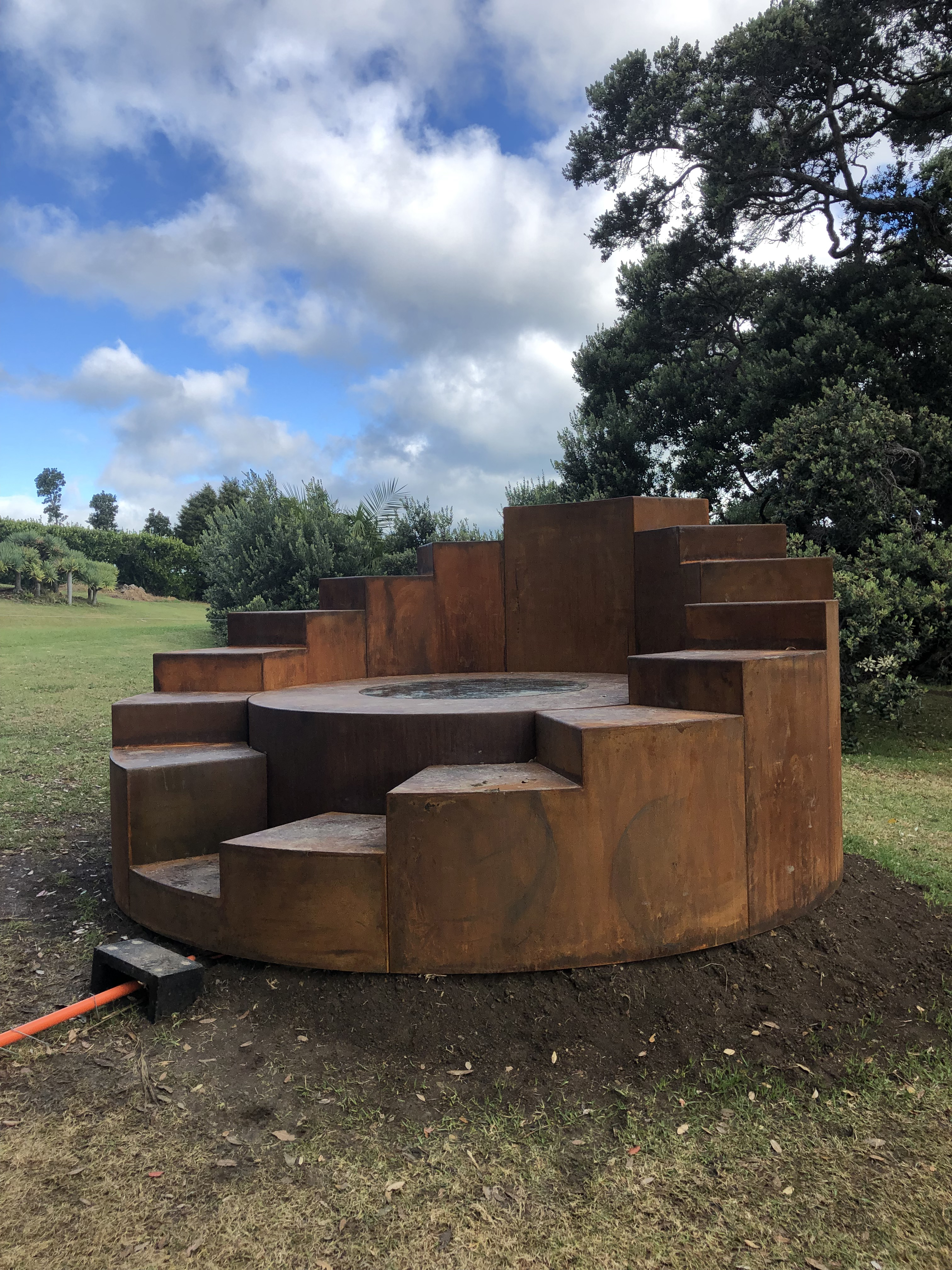
Ground Zero by Professor Robert Jahnke, Sculpture on the Gulf 2019

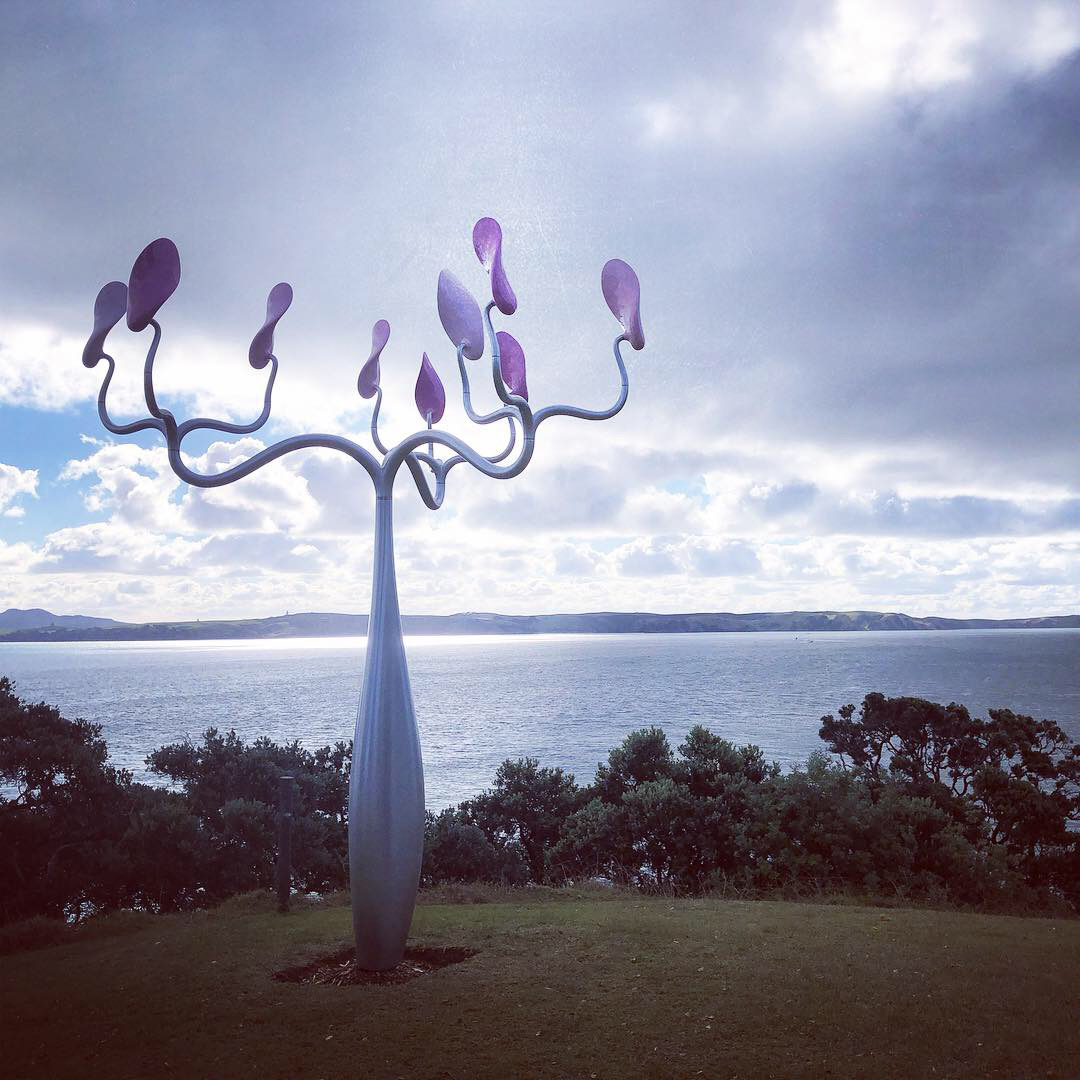
Liberace by Phil Price won the Fullers 360 Experiences People's Choice Award at Sculpture on the Gulf 2019

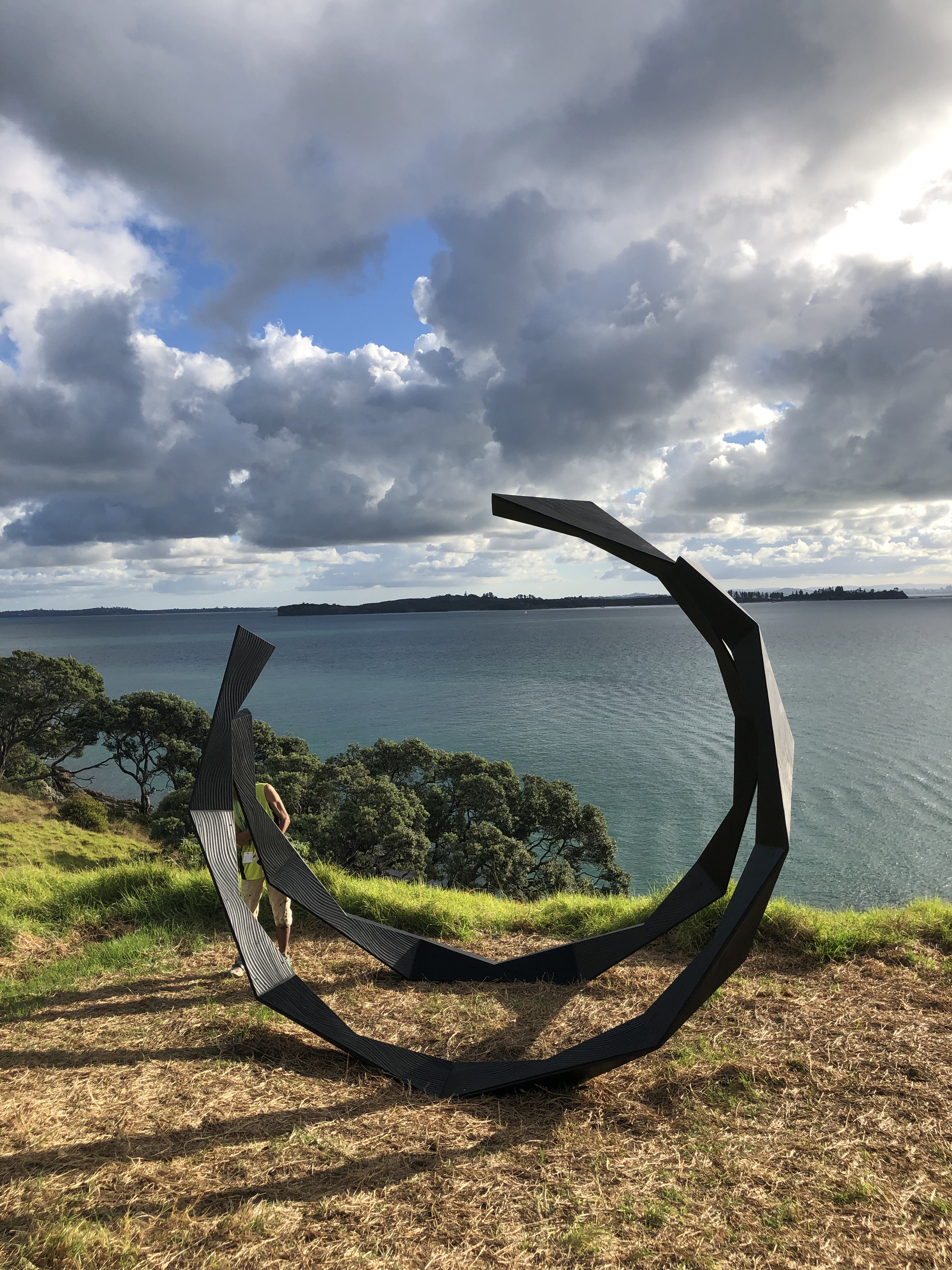
Kazu Nakagawa and Pacific Environments Architects work 'Kaemue Kaemuri' exhibited in Sculpture on the Gulf 2015
