= SOTG =

SOTG may refer to:

== Military ==
- Special Operations Training Group, a training section of the United States Marine Corps
- Special Operations Task Group, an army component in Operation Okra
- Special Operations Task Group, a special forces unit within the Estonian Special Operations Force.

== Other ==
- Spirit of the game, a fair play rule in ultimate frisbee
- Sculpture on the Gulf, an art exhibition
- The Legend of Zelda: Symphony of the Goddesses, a concert tour
- School of the Gifted, a musical project affiliated with Wu-Tang Clan
- "SOTG Remix Intro" and "Straight Out the Gate: (The Scott Stevens Remix)", songs from the 2014 album Strangeulation by Tech N9ne
