= Bunkley =

Bunkley is a surname. Notable people with the surname include:

- Brit Bunkley (born 1955), New Zealand/U.S. artist
- Brodrick Bunkley (born 1983), American football player
- William Henry (Bill) Bunkley (born 1955), Salem Radio Talk Show Host Tampa, Florida

== See also ==
- Buckley (surname)
- Bunkley v. Florida, a 2002 legal case in the United States Supreme Court
