= Giants Amongst Us (sculpture) =

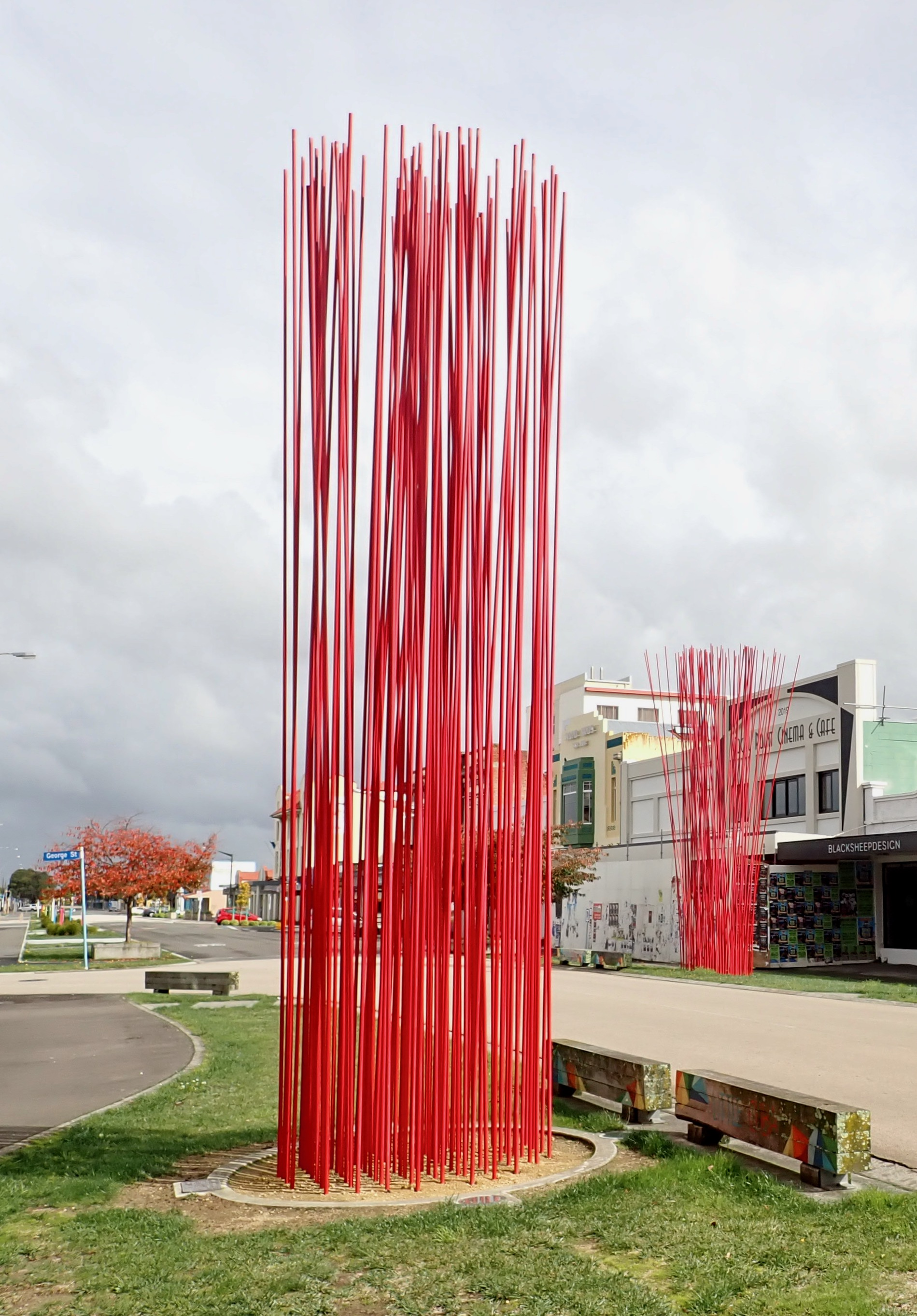
- "Giants Amongst Us" before it was fenced off
- Interactive map of Giants Amongst Us
- Location: Palmerston North, New Zealand
- Coordinates: 40°21′19″S 175°36′30″E
- Designer: Konstantin Dimopoulos
- Material: Fibreglass
- Opening date: 2012

Giants Amongst Us is a fibreglass kinetic sculpture by Konstantin Dimopoulos, located on Cuba Street in Palmerston North, New Zealand. The sculpture consists of two clusters of vertical red fibreglass rods, one 8 metres high and the other 6.5 metres high, on opposite corners of an intersection. The rods move in the wind, creating a rattle noise.

The sculpture was installed in May 2012. In October 2024 the rods began to splinter, and the sculpture was cordoned off. In November 2025 the fencing was made permanent after a child was injured by fibreglass splinters.
