= Minnesota History Center =

History museum in St. Paul, Minnesota

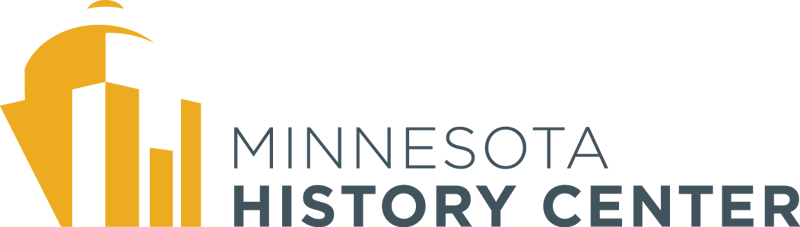

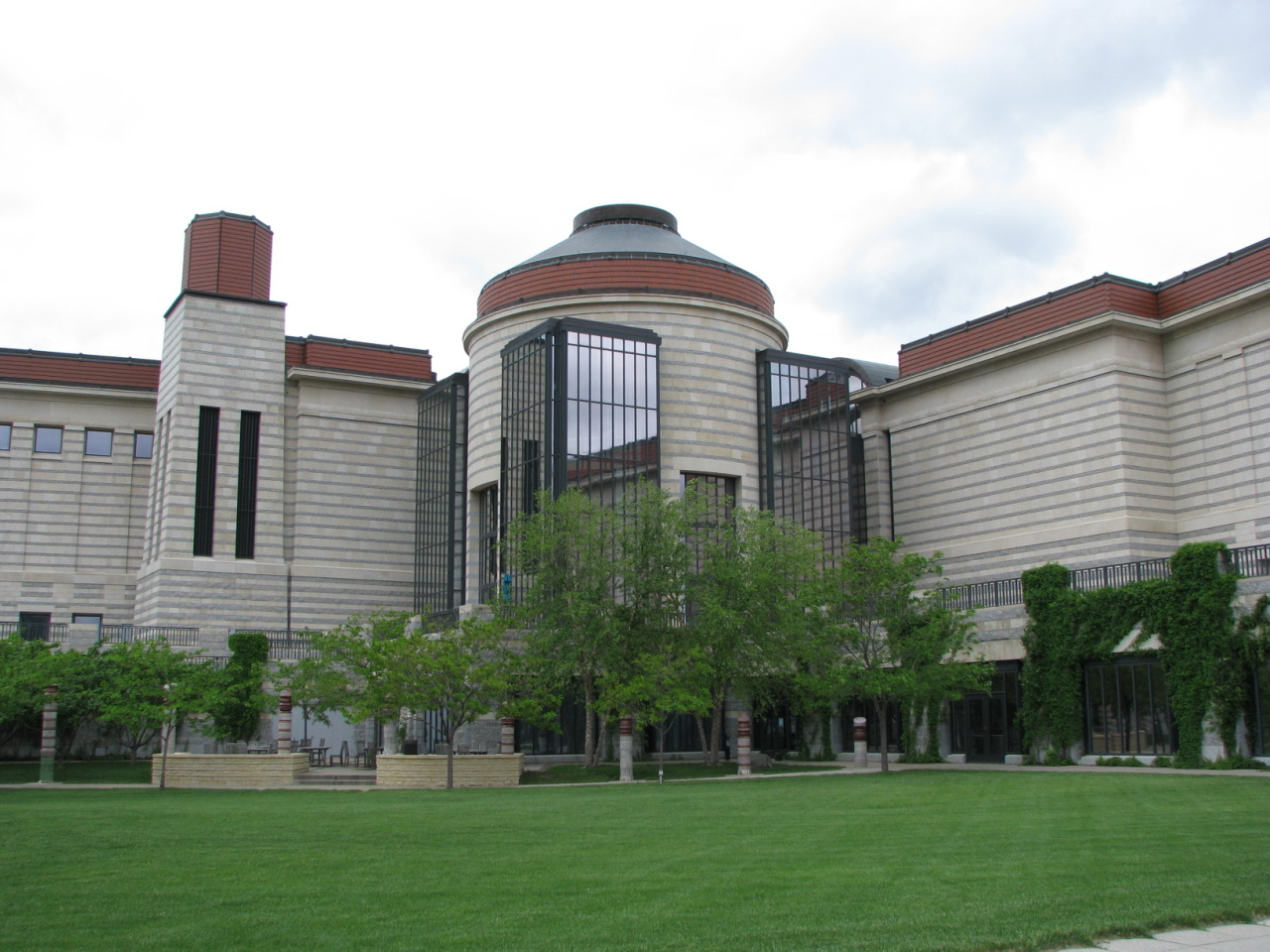
- Established: 1992
- Location: 345 W. Kellogg Boulevard; Saint Paul, Minnesota, United States
- Coordinates: 44°56′59″N 93°6′20″W
- Type: Historical society
- Director: Kent Whitworth
- Public transit access: Bus: 16, 21, 94
- Website: www.mnhs.org

The Minnesota History Center is a museum and library that serves as the headquarters of the Minnesota Historical Society. It is near downtown Saint Paul, Minnesota.

The Minnesota History Center is on Kellogg Boulevard, between the Mississippi River and the Minnesota State Capitol. Before this building was built in 1992, the Minnesota Historical Society (MNHS) occupied what is now the Minnesota Judicial Center, originally built for the Society in 1917. Before that, MNHS was housed in the basement of the State Capitol.

The center hosts concerts, dance performances, lectures, conferences, meetings, dinners, political campaign events, memorial services, receptions, parties, and weddings; as many as 75,000 schoolchildren visit the History Center every year.

== Architecture ==
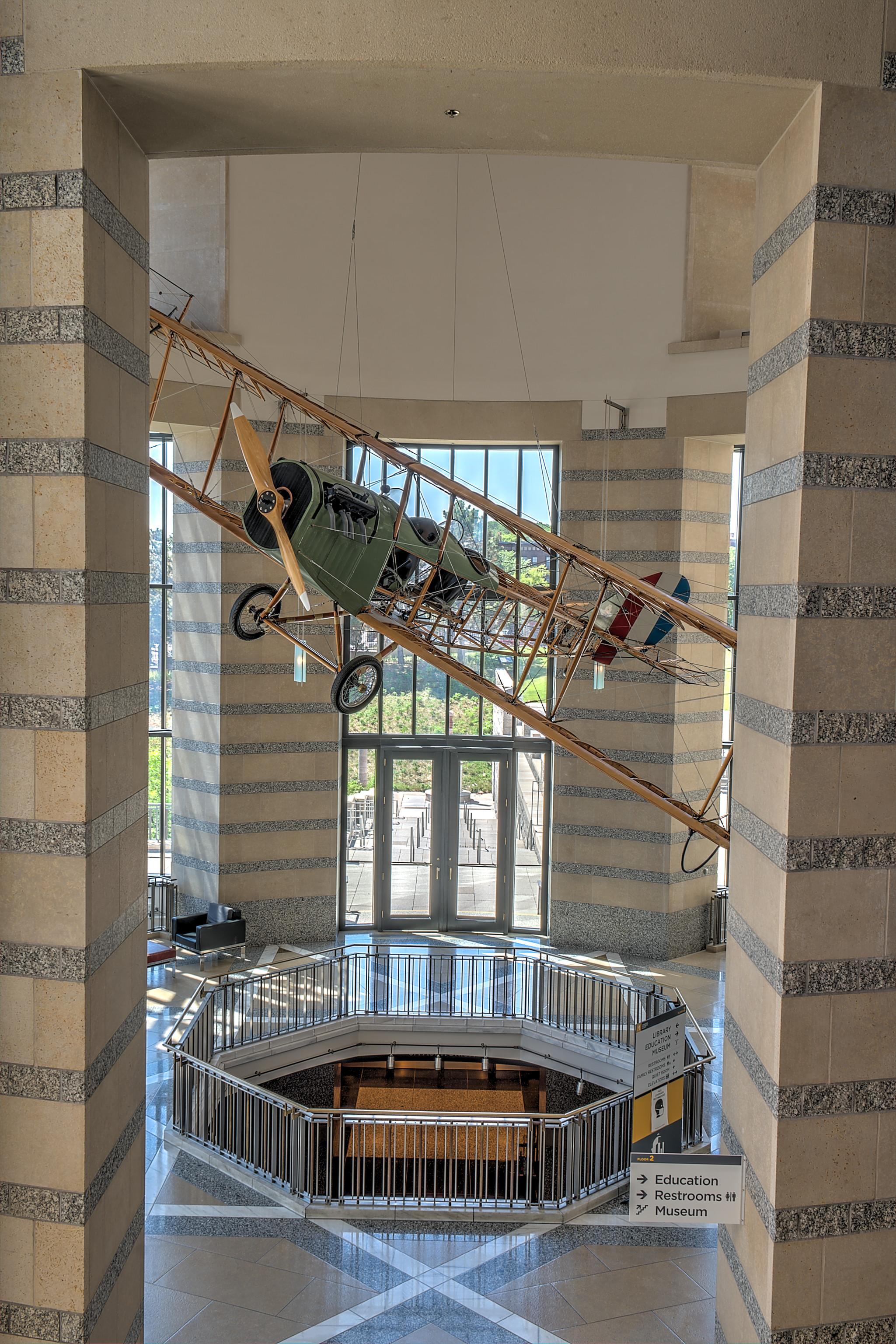
Replica of a Curtiss JN-4 "Jenny" in the rotunda

The Minneapolis architectural firm of Hammel Green and Abrahamson (HGA) designed the History Center's floor plan and exterior. HGA looked to Fort Snelling, the St. Paul's Cathedral and the Minnesota State Capitol for inspiration. One member of the History Center Planning Committee said, "We have envisioned a place that draws the public in, fires the imagination, and responds to its hunger for an understanding of the past. We have envisioned a building alive with people from morning until far into the evening...a vital cultural and educational center."

After ten years of planning and nearly three years of construction, The History Center opened in October 1992. The building features a central dome with two bordering wings, creating an L-shaped design. The north facade faces the Capitol, and the southeast facade overlooks a large lawn and terrace area. Bronze doors admit visitors into the center's main entrance, on the west wall.

The construction budget for the History Center included funds from a Percent for Art program that included three integrated artworks: Charm Bracelet lies on the floor of the first-story rotunda. This project, sculpted by James Casebere, depicts a broken piece of jewelry in which each of ten "charms" represents an important aspect of Minnesota: a tractor (agriculture); a printer's ink roller (civic society and free speech); a tepee (the Dakota tribe); a mill building (lumbering and flour-milling); a house (family); a power plant (technology and industry); a turtle, bear and fish (nature, outdoor recreation, and Ojibwe totems of healing, defense and learning); and a whooping crane (lost wilderness and a metaphor for history). The entrance of the History Center includes glass etchings by Brit Bunkley above the John Ireland and Kellogg Boulevard entrances and the courtyard doors. He created a "system of icons" of sandblasted panels with multidimensional iconic imagery deeply etched onto the thick glass surfaces. Andrew Leicester created Minnesota Profiles, terra cotta columns "marking the edge of where Summit Avenue once crossed what is today’s History Center courtyard". Each column represents a native tree that also include sculpted profiles of 140 volunteers.

The Minnesota History Center is one of the 26 Minnesota Historical Society sites and is home to the Minnesota Historical Society headquarters, the Society's collections, an expansive library, and 44,000 square feet (4,100 m^{2}) of museum gallery space. The museum showcases interactive in-house-developed and traveling exhibits, as well as historical programming and lectures. The center also contains conference rooms, the 3M Auditorium, Café Minnesota, two museum gift shops and 12,800 square feet (1,190 m^{2}) of classroom space.

More than half of the 427,000 square feet (39,700 m^{2}) building is underground, much of which is used for storage. The Minnesota History Center possesses over 1 million artifacts, including archaeological objects, books, photographs, maps, paintings, prints, drawings, manuscripts, government records, newspapers and periodicals. Such artifacts are stored in the 100,000 square feet (9,300 m^{2}) of storage space available in the center. In this storage space, the shelves reach heights over 25 feet. The center also has a conservation laboratory, where conservators repair, stabilize, and maintain the Society's thousands of valuable objects.

== Gale Family Library ==
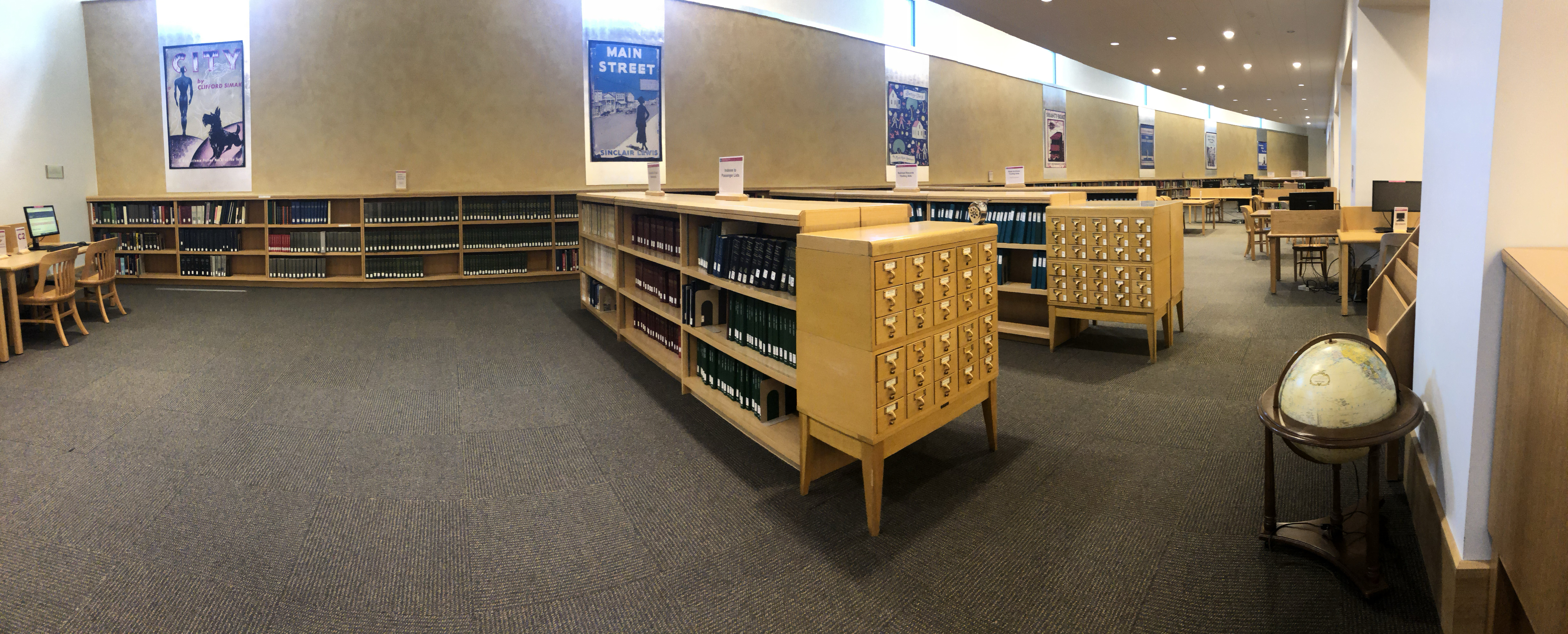
Library Reading Room

The Gale Family Library on the second floor of the History Center offers resources for MNHS members and guests. Two rooms, the Weyerhaeuser Reference Room and the Ronald M. Hubbs Microfilm Reading Room, make up the library area. The library often hosts classes on historical and genealogical research.
