= The Blue Trees (Dimopoulos) =

Artwork by Konstantin Dimopoulos

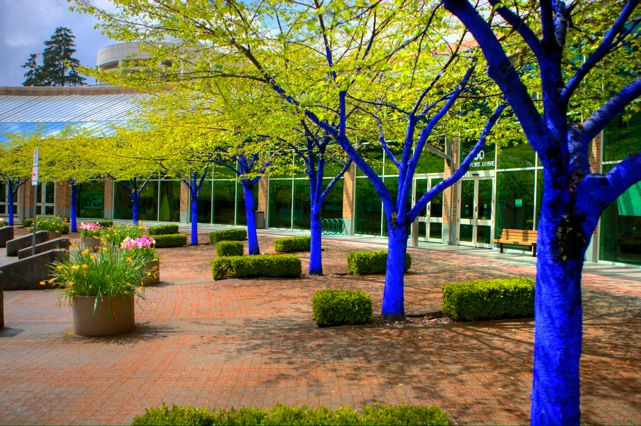
The Blue Trees, 2011 Vancouver Biennale, Canada

The Blue Trees is a performance and installation artwork by the artist Konstantin Dimopoulos that uses a colour transformation to provoke discussion about global deforestation. The trunk and branches of live trees are coloured blue using a biologically safe natural pigment in water. It was first created in pilot form in Melbourne in 2005 and launched in March 2011 at the Vancouver Biennale, Canada. In 2015 ist was installed in Kuenzelsau at Ziehl-Abegg, in 2017 in Downtown Denver, and in 2018 the Currier Museum of Art commissioned a Manchester, New Hampshire installation of The Blue Trees that became the 24th installation of the artwork.
