= Suji Park =

South Korean born New Zealand artist (born 1985)

Suji Park (born 1985) is a Korean-New Zealand ceramic sculptor and artist. In 2015, she was Artist in Residence at McCahon House in Auckland, New Zealand.

Park was born in Seoul, Korea, and moved to New Zealand with her family when she was 12 years old. The family settled in Auckland and she attended St Cuthbert's College. She studied at Elam School of Fine Arts, University of Auckland, graduating with a master's in fine arts in 2013. Many of Park's pieces are of distorted human forms, although vessels and abstract objects are also produced. Some of her art works are created in metal but appear to be ceramic, or are ceramic with a metallic glaze.

Park's work has been exhibited in solo shows at galleries in Auckland and Dunedin, the Dowse Art Museum, Waitakere Contemporary Gallery and at the Sculpture on the Gulf exhibition on Waiheke Island. It is also held in the collection of Auckland Art Gallery Toi o Tāmaki. In addition to presenting solo exhibitions, Park has collaborated with photographers and performance artists, such as for a 2016 show in Auckland, 647nM, with Zahra Killeen-Chance and Solomon Mortimer.

In 2016 Park published a book about her work, Original Unknown.
