= Chris Booth =

New Zealand artist

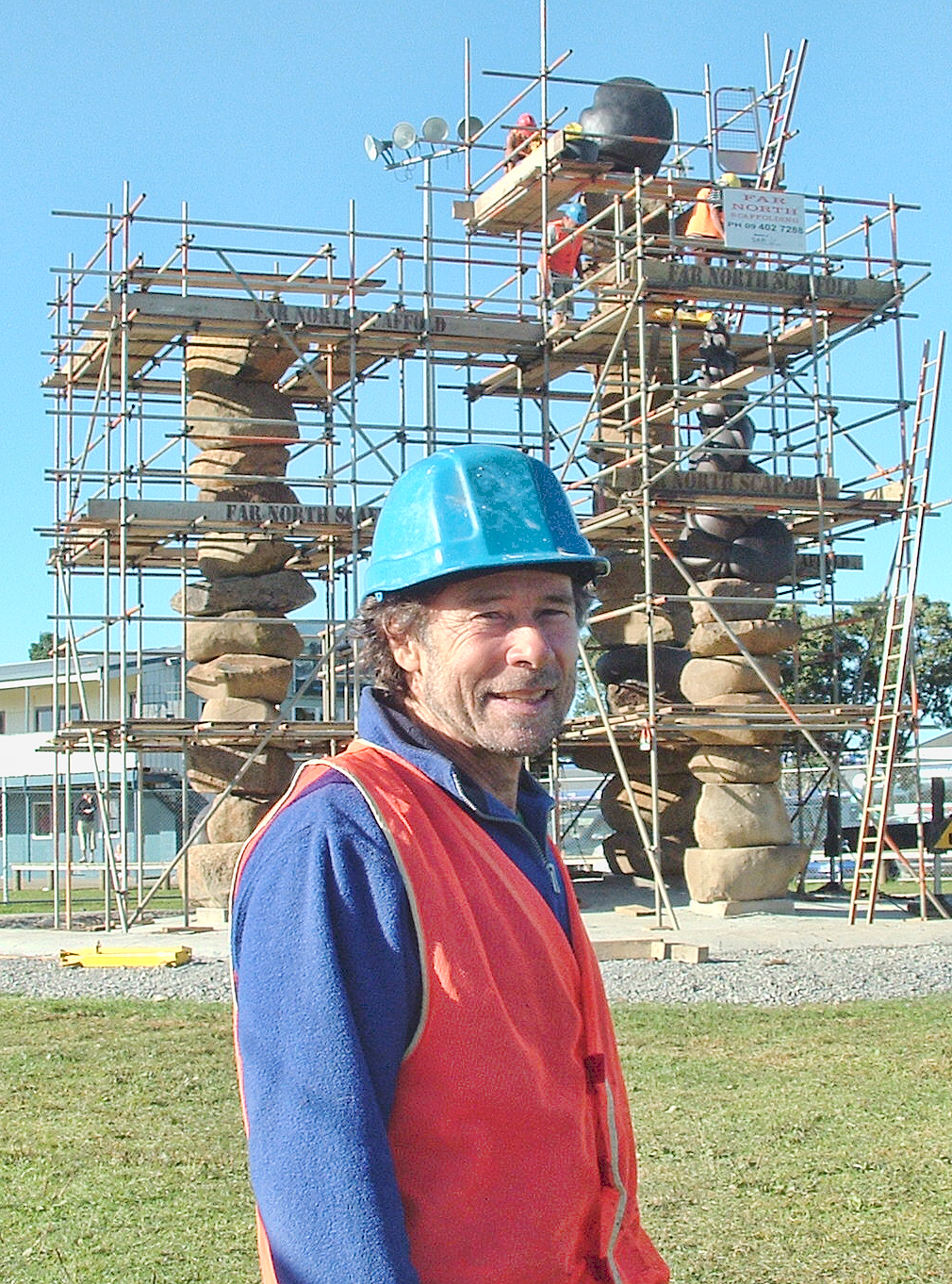
- Chris Booth during the completion of his sculpture 'Te Whiringa O Manoko' in his hometown of Kerikeri in 2009
- Born: 30 December 1948 (age 77); Kerikeri
- Occupation: Sculptor

Chris Booth (born 30 December 1948) is a New Zealand sculptor and practitioner of large-scale land art. He has participated in numerous land art projects and exhibitions internationally and created significant public sculpture commissions in NZ, Australia, the Netherlands, the UK, Germany, Italy, Denmark, France and Canada.

== Early life ==
Booth was born in Kerikeri in the Bay of Islands. He studied at the University of Canterbury School of Fine Arts before taking two years of specialist study in the United Kingdom with sculptors Dame Barbara Hepworth, Denis Mitchell, and John Milne in St Ives; and Quinto Ghermandi in Verona, Italy. Some of Booth's earliest works were inspired by the clearing of scrubland in Northland Region and his concern for how this affected the balance of nature.

== Style ==
Chris Booth works closely with the land, earth forms, and indigenous peoples of the region(s) where he creates his monumental sculptural art works. His way of working emphasises communication and exchange between indigenous and colonial cultures and the creation of meaningful environmental art works.

A major current project is the SLS (Subterranean Living Sculpture) which Booth is developing in association with the Eden Project in Cornwall, UK. The major focus is to educate about the importance of lower plants and fungi for survival and the effect of climate change. Plans are underway to establish the SLS in New Zealand.

== Critical reception ==
Canadian author and curator John Grande commented, "What is more remarkable are the various forms of sculpture he has gone on to produce, entirely unique. While Booth's sculpture sometimes draws upon indigenous Maori and Aborigine characteristics, they remain unique, and capture aspects of topography, natural history, and landscape forms already extant in the places he works."

== Awards and honours ==
In 2011 Booth was awarded Honorary Fellow at Northtec Tai Tokerau Wānanga for 'outstanding and distinguished contribution to society'. In 1982 Booth was the recipient of the Frances Hodgkins Fellowship at the University of Otago, NZ.

== Public sculptures and exhibitions ==
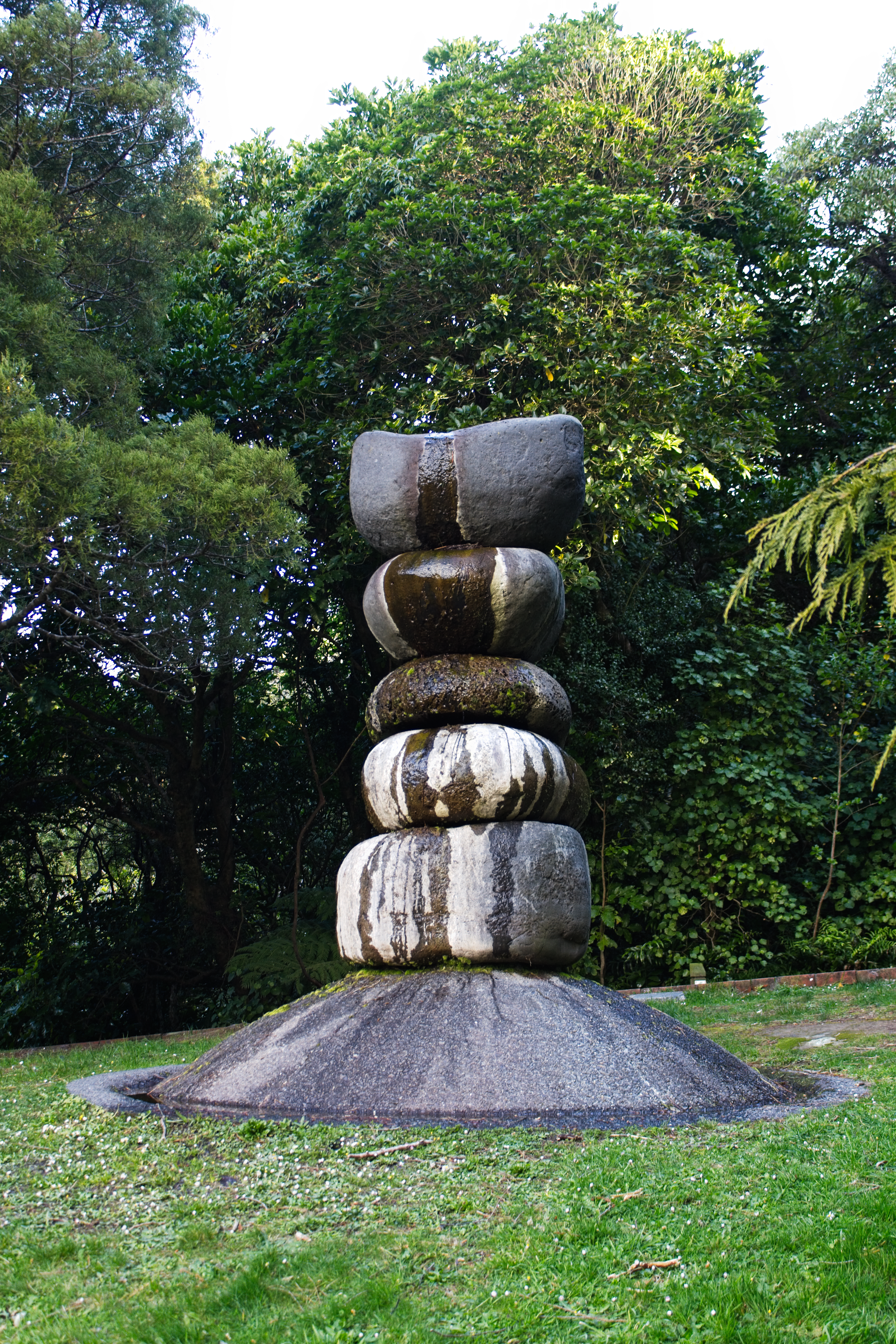
Peacemaker, Wellington Botanic Garden

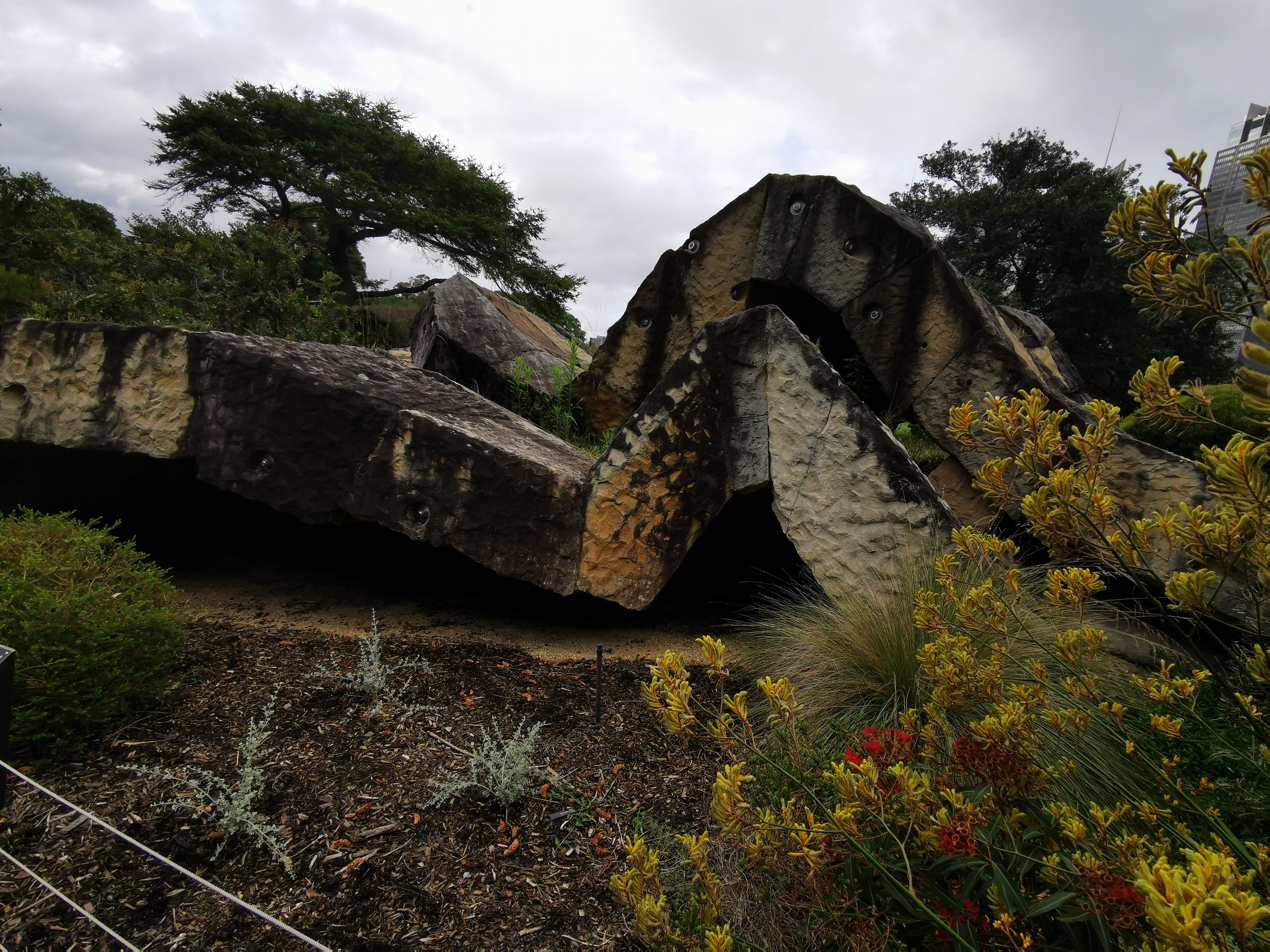
Wurrungwuri, Royal Botanic Garden, Sydney

- Waljin Beela, The Farmer Market River, Western Australia

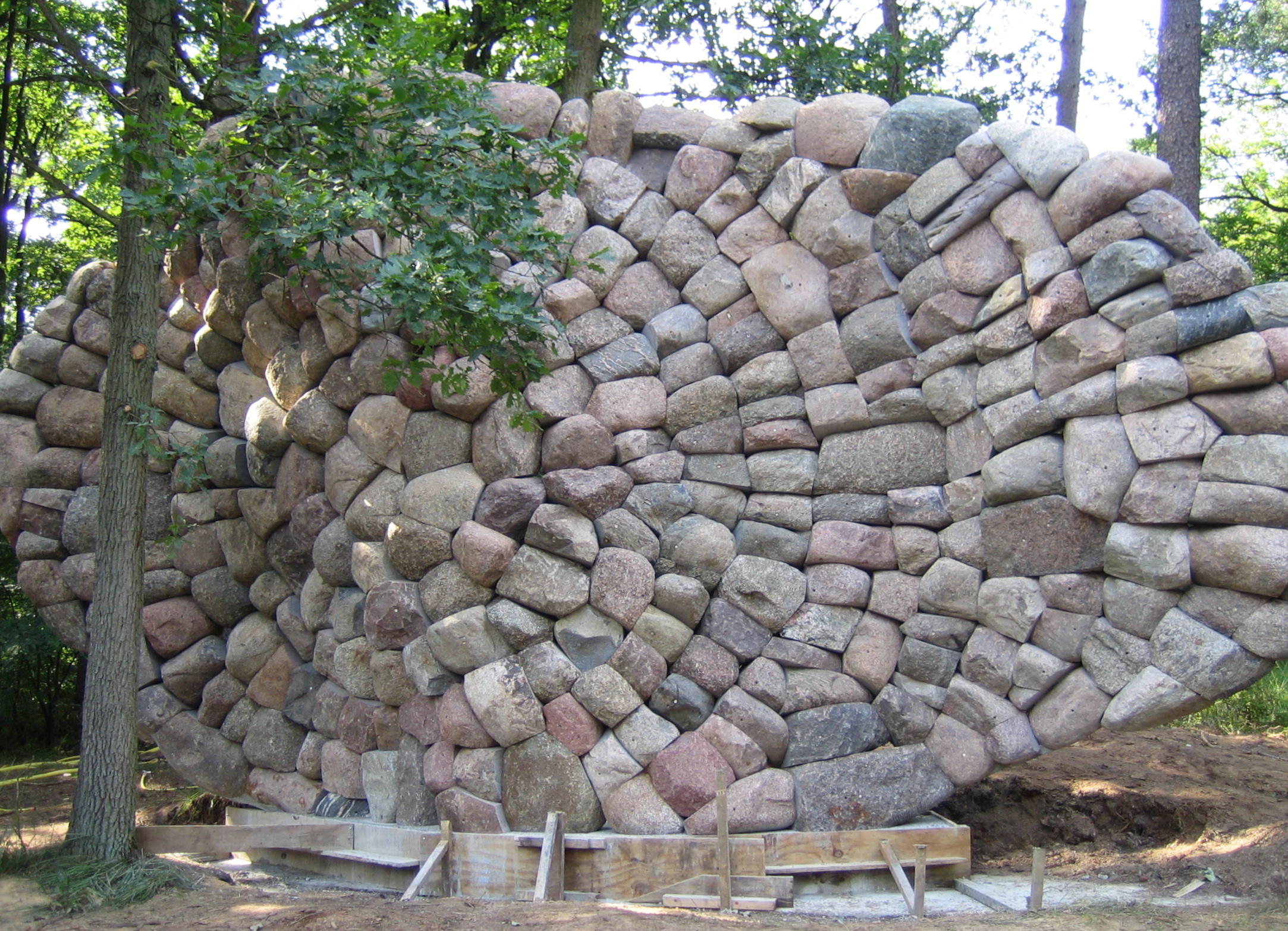
Echo van de Veluwe, Kröller-Müller Museum

- Transformation Plant, VanDusen Botanical Gardens, Vancouver, Canada
- Kaitiaki, Rotoroa Island, Auckland, New Zealand
- Wurrungwuri, Royal Botanic Gardens, Sydney, Australia
- Te Whiringa o Manoko, Kerikeri, New Zealand
- Waka and Wave, Whangārei, New Zealand
- Echo van de Veluwe, Kröller-Müller Museum, Netherlands
- Nga Uri o Hinetuparimaunga, Hamilton, New Zealand
- Peacemaker, Wellington Botanic Gardens, Wellington New Zealand
- Taurapa Christchurch, New Zealand
- Wiyung tchellungnai-najil (Keeper of the light), Gold Coast City Art Gallery, Queensland, Australia
- In Celebration Of A Tor, Grizedale Forest Park, Cumbria, England
- Gateway, Albert Park, Auckland
- Kinetic Fungi Tower, Sculpture On The Gulf, Waiheke Island (2017)
- Te Haa o Te Ao (The Breath of the World), Kerikeri, New Zealand. (2023). Kinetic sculpture on the theme of climate change created with Tom Hei Hei

== Print, film, and media ==
Booth was the subject of Woven Stone- a monograph published in 2007 by Random House, New Zealand.

Publications include: 'Public Art and Ecology, International Public Artists' Discourse on Ecology', Shanghai Literature and Art Publishing House, China, 2011, 'New Zealand Sculpture: A History', Michael Dunn, 2002; 'Chris Booth – Sculpture in Europe, Australia & New Zealand', Edward Lucie-Smith, Ken Scarlett and Gregory O'Brien, 2001; 'Chris Booth Sculpture', David Bateman 1993.

Films include: 'When a Warrior Dies', 1992, Valhalla Productions, Wellington, NZ; Director: Michael Hardcastle; 'Respecting the Earth', 2005, Director: Libby Hakaraia, Maori Television Kete Aronui series III; The Making of Wurrungwuri, 2013, Director: David Stalley, Brain in Hand Productions.

== Website ==
http://www.chrisbooth.co.nz/

Map of Sculptures by Chris Booth
