= Julie Moselen =

British-New Zealand sculptor

- Born: Cornwall, UK
- Education: Bachelor of Arts with Honours in Metal Craft and Jewellery Design
- Occupations: Sculptor, artist, jeweller, teacher
- Website: http://www.juliemoselen.com/

Julie Moselen is a metal sculpture artist based in West Auckland, New Zealand, recognised for her abstract use of corten steel, gold and bronze.

== Family background ==
Moselen's Cornish upbringing is seen in her works' symbolism. After relocating to New Zealand in 1998, she created her own contemporary jewellery studio whilst simultaneously experimenting with different mediums including printmaking, painting, stone carving and sculpture.

== Career ==
Moselen's artistic career has developed from solely selling handmade contemporary metal jewellery, after completing her Bachelor of Arts with Honours in Metal Craft and Jewellery Design, to exhibiting her metal sculptures throughout New Zealand and the UK, including for NZ Sculpture On Shore and Sculpture on the Gulf, and various private commissions. She is now represented by Black Door Gallery. Her practice centres around investigating the portrayal of dualities, incorporating historical references personally significant to her, and attention to detail in the finishing of her works with frequent additions of reflective gold leaf.

She is now based West Auckland as a sculptor and resident artist at Corban Estate Arts Centre. Additionally she has also been a member of Kumeū Arts Centre. These roles have also allowed her to be tutor in different art mediums for multiple age groups for at least 14 years, including her role as head tutor of 'Alt Arts' for the Alternative Education programme offered by Corban Centre.

== Exhibitions ==
Group shows
Date	Title	People	Medium	Location	Source
15 - 28 November 2024	Sacred Geometry	Jamie Adamson and Julie Moselen	Sculpture	Black Door Gallery	
26 September 2025 - 25 October 2025	Wishes on the Wind	Stephanie Sandercock and Julie Moselen	Paintings and Sculptures	Penwith Society of Arts in Cornwall Gallery	

Solo shows
Date	Title	Medium	Location	Source
2020	Whenua Pupuke	- -	North Shore Hospital, Auckland	
2022	Continuum Amplas	Corten Steel	Sculpture on the Gulf, Te Whetumatarau Point, Waiheke Island 2022 Sculpture on the Gulf Exhibiting Artists Archive featuring Moselen's piece	
2023	Let the Winds of the Heavens Dance With You	- -	NZ Sculpture On Shore	
2024	Together	Corten and 23.5ct Gold	Black Door Gallery	
2024	Dance With Me	Stainless Steel and 23.5ct Gold	Black Door Gallery	
2024	Union II	Blackened Steel and 23.5ct Gold	Black Door Gallery	
2024	You and I	Corten and 23.5ct Gold	Black Door Gallery	
2025	In The Stillness Between	Corten and 23.5ct Gold	Black Door Gallery	
2025	Within the Sanctity of Connection II	Corten Steel and 23.5ct Gold	Black Door Gallery	
2025	Woodland Sentinels	Corten Steel and 23.5ct Gold	Penwith Society of Arts in Cornwall Gallery	
2025	Silent Song	Bronze and 23.5ct Gold	Penwith Society of Arts in Cornwall Gallery	
2025	Woven Wishes	Bronze and 23.5ct Gold	Penwith Society of Arts in Cornwall Gallery	
2025	Whispers in the Wood	Bronze and 23.5ct Gold	Penwith Society of Arts in Cornwall Gallery	
2025	Weaving Magic into Dreams	Bronze	Penwith Society of Arts in Cornwall Gallery	
2026	Sentinels	Corten Steel and 23.5ct Gold	Black Door Gallery	
- -	Wisdom of the Ancient One	Corten Steel	The Sculpture Park at Waitakaruru Arboretum	

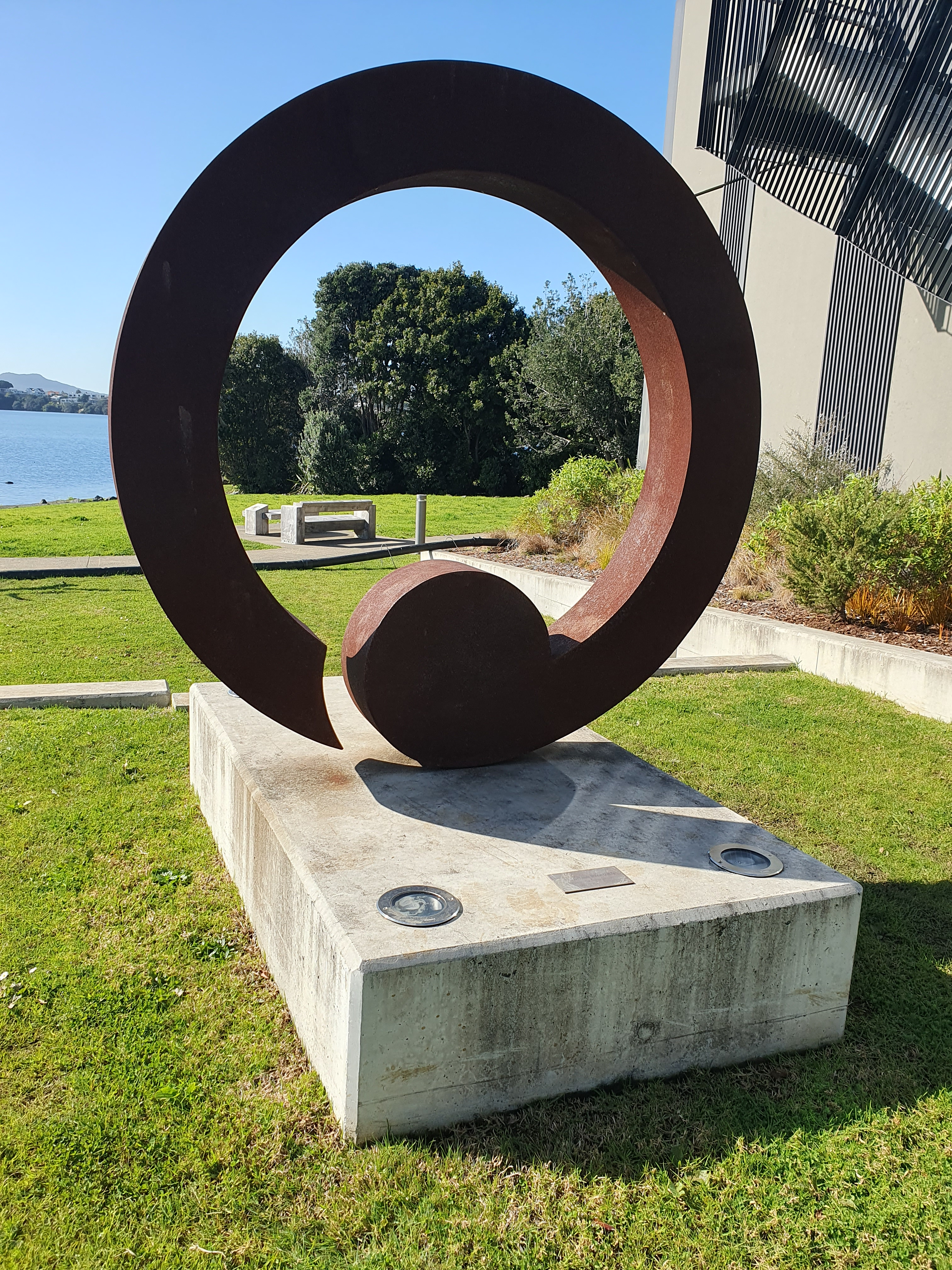
Whenua Pupuke (2020), Julie Moselen, at the North Shore Hospital on the shores of Lake Pupuke on the North Shore, Auckland, New Zealand.

== Recognition ==
- Moselen's piece Unity for NZ Sculpture On Shore 2021 was reviewed by New Zealand art critic John Daly-Peoples.
- Her work entitled Continuum Amplas was noted by New Zealand arts reviewer John Daly-Peoples in his account of Sculpture on the Gulf 2022. Similarly, the same work was discussed in a 2022 Stuff article on the exhibition.
- With Black Door Gallery, a selection of her works were exhibited at the Aotearoa Art Fair in April 2024.
- In 2024 RNZ reported on her Draco the Dragon corten steel and gold leaf sculpture that once sat atop an old wine vat at Corban Estate Arts Centre was stolen.
