= Gill Gatfield =

New Zealand sculptor (born 1963)

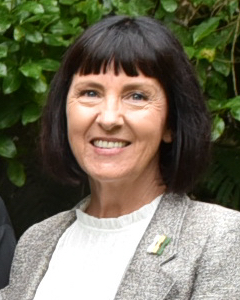
Gatfield in 2020

Gill Gatfield (born 1963) is a New Zealand sculptor; she was formerly a lawyer specialising in equality and diversity.

== Biography ==
Gatfield grew up in Kawerau, one of five daughters. Her mother was a maths teacher and her father taught science.

=== Law ===
Gatfield completed a law degree at the University of Auckland. She initially worked in legal practice, then in non-governmental organisations and the Ministry of Women's Affairs. At the Ministry she worked on policy development including pornography law reform, child support tax, employment discrimination, and women in combat. In 1993, she founded Equity Works Ltd, investigating complaints of harassment and discrimination, and advised government and private sector organisations on equality and diversity strategies. Gatfield also received a research scholarship from the New Zealand Law Society to study issues related to women in law and in 1996 published Without prejudice: women in the law, which was re-published in 2011 as a Heritage Collection Title.

=== Art ===
In 2002, Gatfield returned to the University of Auckland and completed a Master of Fine Arts degree in 2004. In 2011, her work Silhouette, a stone sculpture at Smales Farm busway station in Auckland, was a finalist in the Wallace Art Awards. In 2015, Gatfield was the sole juror of the 18th International Open 2015 Chicago, an open competition for women artists worldwide. The same year, she was artist in residence at the Women's Museum, Aarhus, in Denmark.
