= Denis O'Connor (New Zealand sculptor) =

New Zealand ceramicist and writer

Denis O'Connor (born 1947) is a New Zealand ceramicist, sculptor and writer who has exhibited both in New Zealand and internationally.

== Education ==
O'Connor studied at the Wellington Polytechnic School of Design and the University of Otago.

== Career ==
O'Connor's early work was made using white porcelain and the iron-rich clay which he found near his studio on Waiheke Island. In 1985 he was awarded the Frances Hodgkins Fellowship at Otago University, and during his tenure he switched to using limestone. More recently he has incorporated found objects and has started to use black slate, which has introduced a more minimalist aesthetic.

== Residencies ==
He has held international residencies including:

- Frances Hodgkins Fellowship, Otago University (1985)
- Moet and Chandon Fellowship, Champagne, France (1996)
- Rathcoola Fellowship, Cork, Ireland (2005)
- Blumhardt Foundation Residency in Gulgong, New South Wales, Australia (2016), (2017–18)

== Public commissions and collections ==
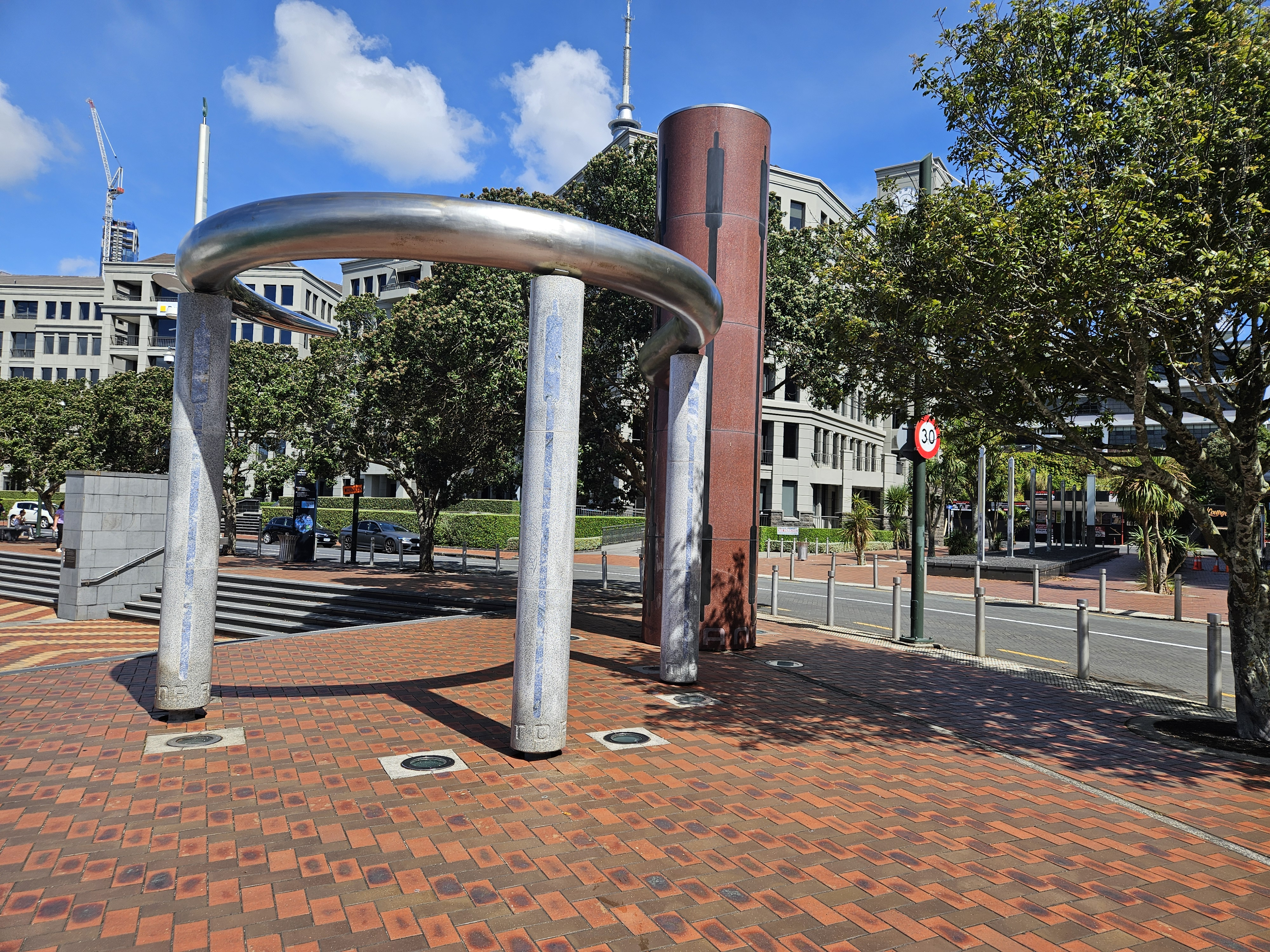
Raupō Rap (2005) on the Auckland waterfront

O'Connor has had many prestigious commissions, and his works are held in a large number of public collections including:

- Aotea Centre, Auckland
- Auckland Art Gallery Toi o Tāmaki
- Auckland Museum Te Papa Whakahiku
- Auckland Regional Authority
- Australia Council for the Arts, Sydney
- City Gallery, Wellington
- Connells Bay Sculpture Park
- Dowse Art Museum, Lower Hutt
- Dunedin Public Art Gallery
- Frances Hodgkins Fellowship Collection, University of Otago, Dunedin
- Govett-Brewster Art Gallery, New Plymouth
- Hocken Library, University of Otago, Dunedin
- Ministry of Foreign Affairs and Trade, Wellington
- Ministry of Justice, High Court, Auckland
- Ministry of Justice, High Court, Wellington
- Moët et Chandon, Épernay, France
- Montana Wines Ltd, New Zealand
- Museum of New Zealand Te Papa Tongarewa
- National Bank, Auckland
- National Gallery of Victoria, Melbourne
- National Maritime Museum, Auckland
- North Harbour Chapel, Albany, Auckland
- Rijksmuseum Kroller-Muller, Netherlands
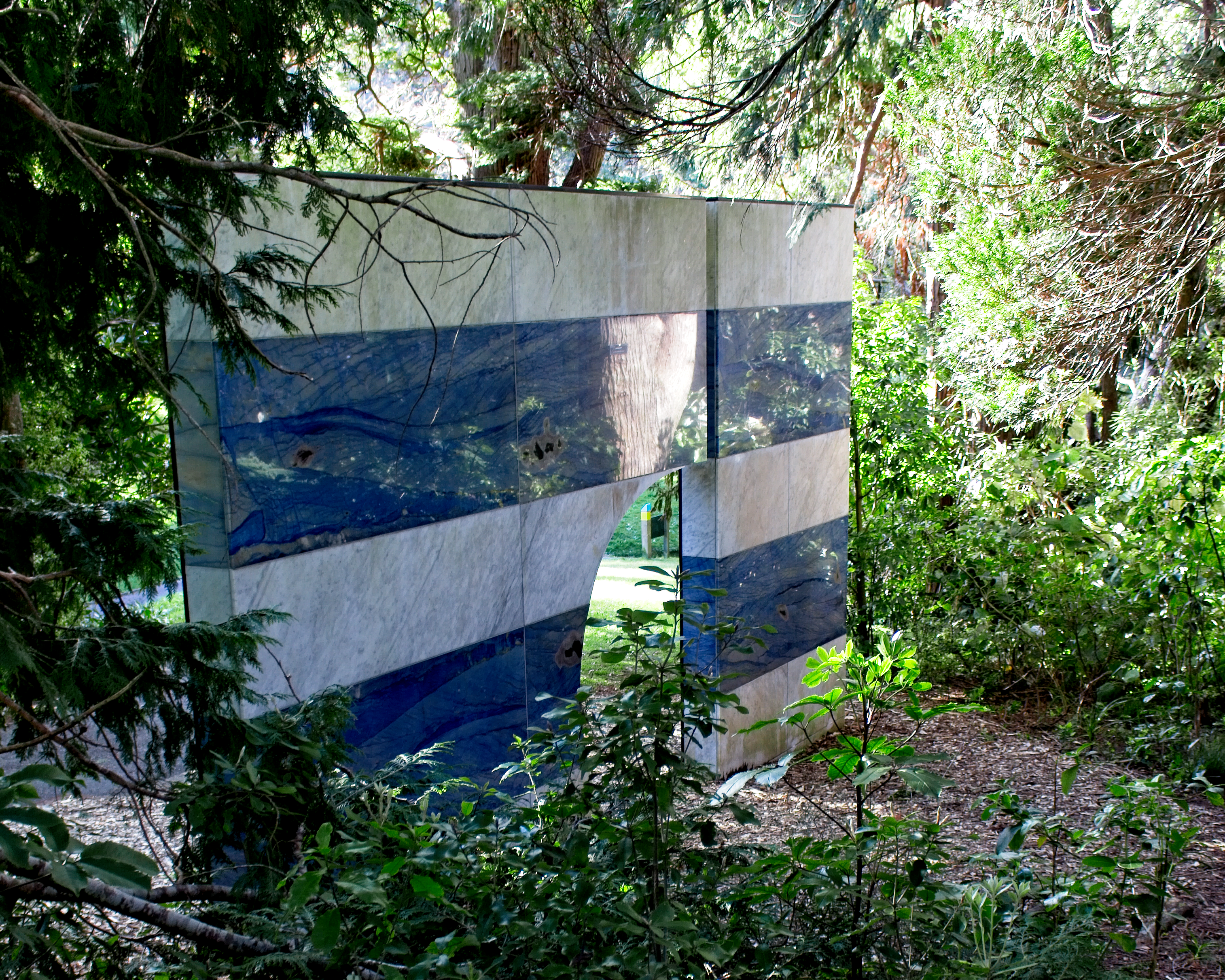
- Rudderstone , Wellington Botanic Garden
  Robert McDougall Art Gallery, Christchurch
- Royal Scottish Museum, Edinburgh
- Sky City Casino, Auckland
- University of Auckland
- Viaduct Basin, Auckland
- Waikato Museum of Art and History, Hamilton
- Wairarapa Arts Foundation, Masterton
- Wellington City Council
- Wellington Sculpture Trust, Wellington Botanic Garden

== Publications ==
O'Connor has produced several written works to accompany his major exhibitions:

- Songs of the gulf 1984
- The Gorse King 1992
- Big aitche little aitche 2000
- What the roof dreamt 2007
