= Veronica Herber =

New Zealand artist

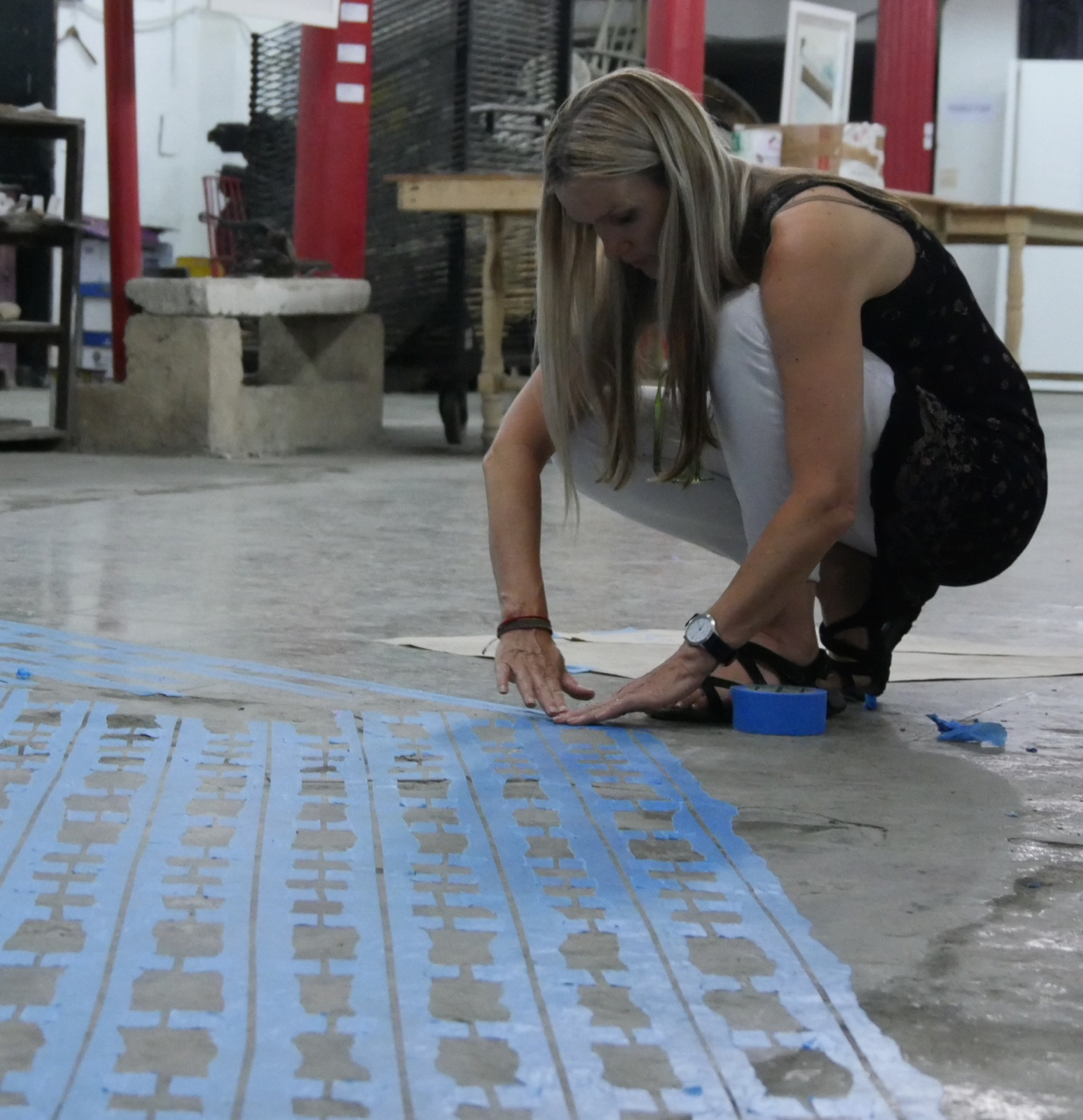
- Veronica Herber installing at Rene Portocarrero Serigrafia Studio, Havana, February 2016
- Education: Auckland University of Technology
- Known for: Use of Japanese Washi tape, Installation Art
- Awards: 2015 Winner, Wallace Arts Trust New Zealand Sculptor Award, Sculpture by the Sea, Sydney; 2012 Winner Titirangi Community Arts Council Emerging Artist award. Titirangi, Auckland; 2012 Winner Ebbett Prestige Environmental Award, Hamilton
- Website: Official website

Veronica Herber is a New Zealand artist who lives and works in Auckland. She is best known for working with Japanese Washi tape.

== Education ==
Veronica Herber holds a Bachelor of Visual Arts with Distinction from Auckland University of Technology. At present Herber is completing a Post Graduate Diploma at Elam School of Fine Arts. The artist initially practiced painting before discovering tape as a medium.

== Career ==
Veronica Herber has exhibited in several large-scale sculpture projects both in New Zealand and abroad. Since 2013, she has participated in the biennial outdoor sculpture exhibition, Headland: Sculpture on the Gulf, (2013, 2015, 2017), on Waiheke Island, Auckland, as well as the annual outdoor sculpture exhibition Sculpture by the Sea, (2013, 2014, 2015) in Sydney, Australia.

She has held solo exhibitions at public institutions such as Te Uru Waitakere Contemporary Gallery, Tauranga Art Gallery, and the Pah Homestead, Auckland. In 2014, Herber's public installation, Conversando Con Puebla, Pueblo, Mexico, covered a 600 year old courtyard with the artist's distinctive use of Washi tape, and in 2016, she was invited to create an installation at the Rene Portocarrero Serigrafia Studio, in Havana, Cuba.

Veronica Herber's work is included in the Chartwell Collection, Auckland Art Gallery Toi o Tāmaki, and The James Wallace Arts Trust Collection. She is the 2015 recipient of The Wallace Arts Trust New Zealand Sculptor Award, awarded each year to one participating artist in the Sculpture by the Sea, Bondi, Australia.

== Work ==
=== Notable exhibitions ===
- Swathe, James Wallace Trust, Auckland, 2017
- Headland Sculpture on the Gulf, Waiheke Island, 2017, 2015, 2013
- Continuum, Tauranga Art Gallery, 2017
- Fold, group show, Blue Mountains Cultural Centre, Sydney, 2017
- Resonance, NZ Steel Gallery, Franklin Arts Centre, Auckland, 2016
- Installation at Rene Portocarrero Serigrafia Studio, Havana, Cuba, 2016
- Sculpture by the Sea, Sydney, 2015, 2014, 2013
- Conversando Con Puebla, Puebla, Mexico, 2014
- Wallace Art Awards, Pah Homestead, Auckland 2014
- Site Unseen, Te Uru Waitakere Contemporary Gallery, Auckland, 2013–2014
- In Line With, group show, Antionette Godkin Gallery, Auckland, 2013
- Sculpture on the Shore, Devonport, Auckland, 2012
- The Sculpture Park, Waitakaruru Arboretum, Hamilton, 2012

=== Public collections ===
- Chartwell Collection, Auckland Art Gallery Toi o Tāmaki
- The James Wallace Arts Trust, Auckland, New Zealand

=== Awards and nominations ===
- 2017 Finalist Wallace Art Awards, Auckland
- 2017 Finalist Parkin Prize, Wellington
- 2016 Finalist Wallace Art Awards, Auckland
- 2015 Winner Wallace Arts Trust New Zealand Sculptor Award, Sculpture by the Sea, Sydney
- 2014 Finalist Wallace Art Awards, Auckland
- 2013 Finalist Parkin Prize, Wellington
- 2012 Winner Titirangi Community Arts Council Emerging Artist Award, Titirangi, Auckland
- 2012 Finalist Walker and Hall Waiheke Art Award, Waiheke Island
- 2012 Winner Ebbett Prestige Environmental Award, Hamilton
