= Leon van den Eijkel =

Dutch-born New Zealand artist (1940–2021)

- Born: 15 October 1940; The Hague, Netherlands
- Died: 15 April 2021 (aged 80); Auckland, New Zealand
- Education: Royal Academy of Art, The Hague
- Occupation: Artist

Leon van den Eijkel (15 October 1940 – 15 April 2021) was a Dutch-born New Zealand artist who studied at The Hague's Royal Academy of Art from 1958 to 1963, and emigrated to New Zealand in 1986. Van den Eijkel exhibited widely in Europe, the United States, and New Zealand, and is represented in many major public and private collections.

== Biography ==
Van den Eijkel was born in The Hague on 15 October 1940. He studied at the Royal Academy of Arts, The Hague, from 1958 to 1963. He moved to Leiden in 1967, and emigrated to New Zealand in 1986. He first settled in Wellington, remaining there until 1998, before moving to Auckland, where he lived for the rest of his life. Van den Eijkel died on 15 April 2021, aged 80.

== Style ==
His use of colour has been heavily influenced by the works of Mondrian which he saw as a child in his native Netherlands. After moving to New Zealand and visiting the kauri forests he was inspired to produce a series of works based on urban trees which culminated in the Urban Forest sculpture in Wellington. This work has the size and heft of a kauri tree trunk combined with his trademark primary colours. He collaborated on this work and other large fabricated steel pieces with the engineer Alan Brown and the team at Metal Art Ltd.

== Public collections ==
He is represented in major international collections including:

- Stedelijk Museum Amsterdam
- Museum Boijmans Van Beuningen, Rotterdam
- Museum van Hedendaagse Kunst, Ghent
- Museum of Modern Art, New York
- Museum of New Zealand Te Papa Tongarewa, Wellington

== Notable works ==
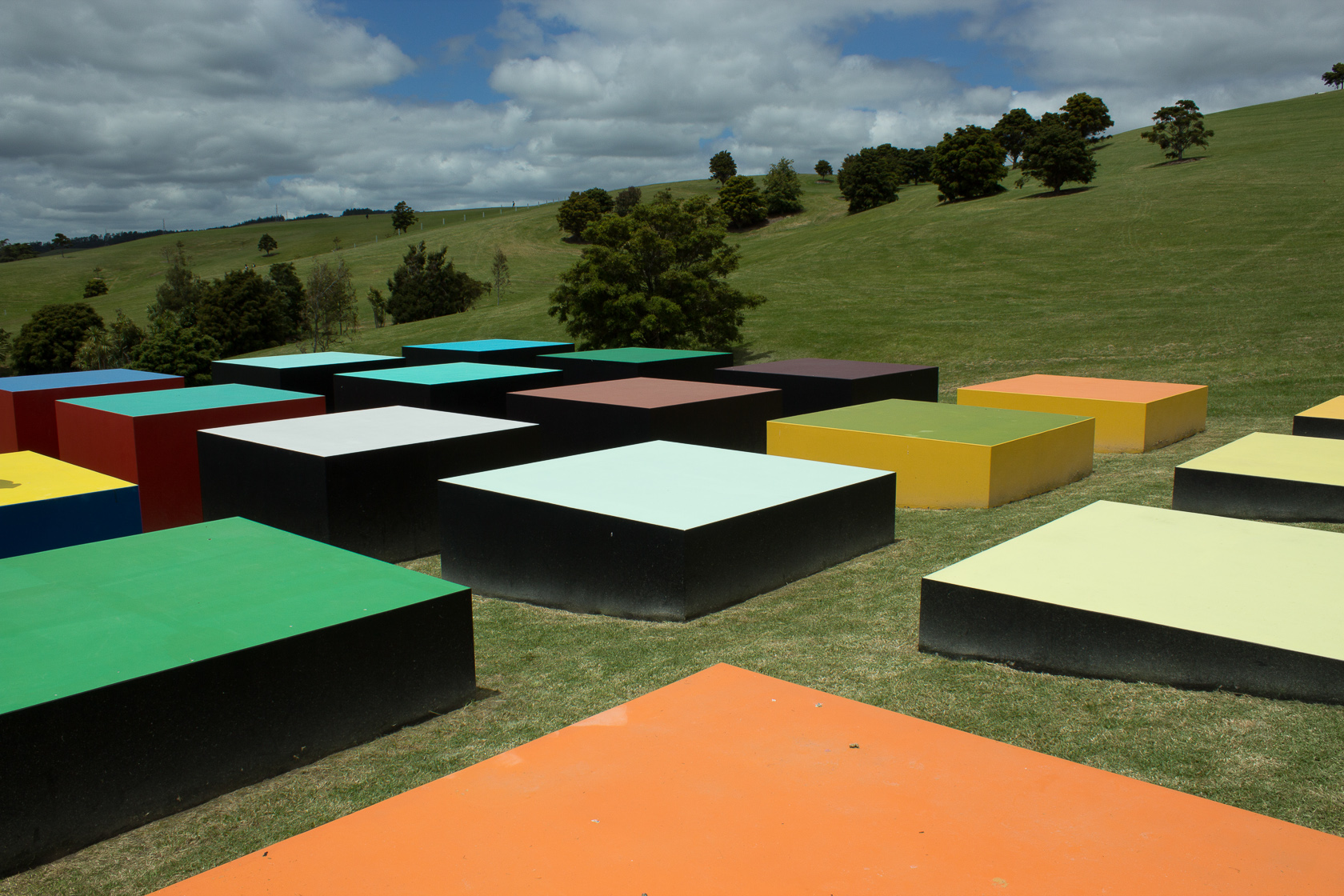
Red Cloud Confrontation in Landscape (1996), installed at Gibbs Farm

- Mondrian after Mondriaan shown both at Galerir Stelling, Leiden (1993) and Museum of New Zealand (1995)
- Red Cloud Confrontation in Landscape (1996) – Gibbs Farm, Kaipara Harbour, New Zealand.
- The Black Paintings (1997) New work Studio, Wellington New Zealand
- Tourism on the Line (1998) - Galerie Y-burg, Amsterdam
- The Long Cloud Paintings (1999) Archill Gallery, Auckland, New Zealand
- A Walk in the Clouds (2004) – New Zealand Embassy, The Hague, Netherlands
- Light of Colour (2005) – Brian R Richards Ltd, Auckland New Zealand
- Urban Forest (2007) – Cobham Drive, Wellington, New Zealand
- The Smiling Windmills (2008) – Avalon Park, Lower Hutt, New Zealand
- Cross(Road) (2009) – Sculpture on the Gulf, Waiheke Island, New Zealand
- The Remembrance Windmill (2009) Sculpture by the Sea, Bondi Beach, Sydney, Australia
- The Next Big Family Series (2009) Plantage Galerie, Leiden, The Netherlands
- Towards Photography (2011) Toi Gallery, Waiheke Island, Auckland NZ
- Colour Coding (2012) New paintings and works on paper. Bowen Galleries, Wellington NZ
- Baubles (2013) Brick Bay Sculpture Trail, Warkworth, New Zealand
- The Playing Windmills (2014) Hobsonville Point Primary School, Auckland New Zealand
- The Geometric Totem Pole (2017) Brick Bay Sculpture Trail, Warkworth, New Zealand..
