= Brit Bunkley =

New Zealand-American artist

- Born: 1958 (age 67–68); New York City
- Education: Macalester College B.F.A. Minneapolis College of Art and Design M.F.A. Hunter Collage
- Website: https://www.britbunkley.com/

Brit Bunkley (born 1955 in New York City) is a New Zealand/U.S. artist whose art practice includes sculpture, installation, public art and video, since the 1990s with an emphasis on 3D digital media. Awards include the National Endowment for the Arts, the CAPS grant, and the Rome Prize Fellowship. His work expresses a keen interest in history, politics and the environment.

Matthew Crookes wrote for the Creative New Zealand funded arts agency, Circuit that "Bunkley’s practice throws up many contradictions: the emphasis on the surface, yet the references are to things and ideas outside the work itself. Pessimism mixed with dry humour. The maker of monuments now deconstructing them. Bunkley has taken the 'unspoken power' of monuments and unpacked it, and laid it bare".

== Early life and education ==
Brit Bunkley was born in New York City. He attended Macalester College and Minneapolis College of Art and Design 1973–1979. He received an MFA from Hunter College in New York in 1984. He immigrated from New York City to New Zealand in 1995 to take up a teaching position as head of sculpture at the Quay School of the Arts Whanganui. He became a New Zealand citizen in 1998.

== Public sculptures ==
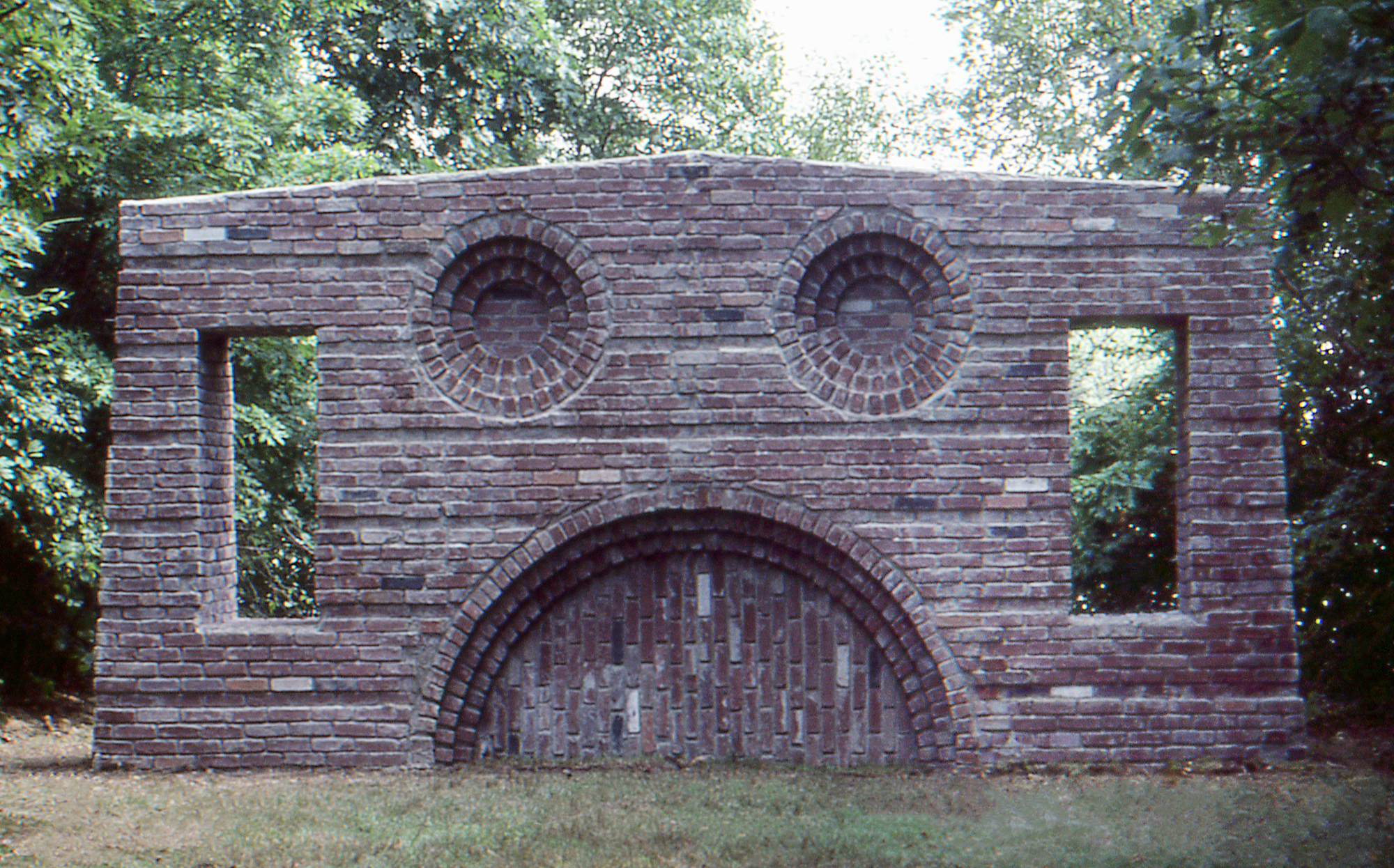
Gate Mask, at the Islip Art Museum, Islip, N.Y., 1985

His early career in the U.S.A. included a number of permanent public art commissions including Gate Mask in New York City of which Michael Brenson wrote in the New York Times: "Rubbing together a new suburban façade that seems to be rising and an old façade that seems to be sinking into the ground creates sparks with social and political colorations". The sculpture was moved from Manhattan to the Islip Art Museum. Islip, NY in 1984. Other works included a sculpture commission at City College, NYC, a New York M.T.A. Arts for Transit Commission, Long Island Railroad, Bay Shore Station, Bay Shore, N.Y. and the front entrance of the Minnesota History Center, St. Paul, Minnesota both completed in 1992. In 2012 he completed the commission, Hear My Train a' Comin' in Whanganui, NZ. He has recently completed a number of temporary public art projects with Andrea Gardner including Peaceable Kingdom Whanganui in Whanganui, New Zealand, 2020. Bunkley and Gardner won the Supreme Award at Sculpture in the Gardens in Auckland in 2024.

== Digital and video art ==
Bunkley began making experimental digital and video art in the 1990s as a response to his new place of residence in NZ. In a 2003 interview, he said "Because of my relative isolation from sources of commissioned work, I jumped head first into the 3D digital realm which has proven not only a technical challenge but opened up creative possibilities that I never knew existed". His first solo exhibition of 3D digital art, Monuments and Icons, was at the Sarjeant Gallery in Wanganui, New Zealand in 1998.

Bunkley organized and participated in the digital sculpture exhibition at Wellington's Adam Art Gallery, Intersculpt 2001 He exhibited video 3D animations at Te Papa (the Museum of NZ), Wellington, NZ for the 2002 exhibition st@rt up : new interactive media and animation. In 2002 he was invited as an artist-in-residence ("working artist") for SIGGRAPH: 2002's art gallery in San Antonio, Texas. He exhibited digital 3D video as part of Ciberart-Bilbao 2004 in Bilbao, Spain. Bunkley, along with Ian Gwilt, organized and exhibited in the 3D digital sculpture and 3D animation exhibition, MadeKnown at the UTS Gallery in Sydney Australia in 2005.

Art critic Mark Amery, in a 2013 Circuit Podcast, said that Bunkley's "video work is in more film and video festivals around the world, be it Moscow or Oslo, than any other New Zealand artist that Circuit can think of". Bunkley has screened and exhibited his video artwork at numerous exhibitions and festivals including:

- Messengers, City Gallery, Wellington; and the Sarjeant Gallery, Whanganui - 2025-26
- New York City Indie Film Festival, Award -Best Art | Experimental, NYC, 2024
- FiVA 11, video art at the Gral. San Martín Cultural Center, Buenos Aires, Argentina 2023
- Visions in the Nunnery, Bows Art/Nunnery Gallery, London, 2022
- Art Takes 2021, Ki Smith Gallery, NYC, NY, 2021
- The NewMediaFest2020 screening in Berlin, Teufelsberg, Berlin, Germany, 2020
- NewMediaFest2020 7/8 WOW Jubilee VIII U.S.A. Torrance Art Museum Los Angeles, U.S.A., 2020
- LesRencontres Internationales Paris/Berlin, Le Carreau Du Temple, Paris, France, Haus der Kulturen der Welt, Berlin, Germany, 2019
- Kasseler Dokfest, Kassel, Germany, 2019
- International Short Film Festival Oberhausen, Oberhausen, Germany, 2018
- Ghost Shelter/6 at The Federation Square Big Screen, Channels Festival, Melbourne, Australia, 2017
- Athens Digital Arts Festival, Athens, Greece, 2017
- E.V.A. Experimental Video Architecture¸ Isolab, Venice, Italy, 2016
- FILE 2015; Fiesp Cultural Center, São Paulo, Brazil, 2015
- Melbourne Art Fair, Melbourne, Australia, 2014
- Paradox of Plenty, public exhibition for the month of September at the Oslo Central Station, Oslo Screen Festival in collaboration with Kunsthall Oslo, Oslo, Norway, 2013
- Now&After’12, Moscow Museum of Modern Art, Russian Federation, 2012
- Rencontres Internationales Paris/Madrid/Berlin, Pompidou Center, Paris 2010, the Reina Sofia National Museum, Madrid, Spain, and the Haus der Kulturen der Welt, Berlin, Germany, 2011
- Sanctioned Array-Other2 Specify, White Box Gallery, NYC, U.S.A., 2010
- "st@rt up : new interactive media and animation", video: Te Papa (Museum of NZ), Wellington, NZ 2002

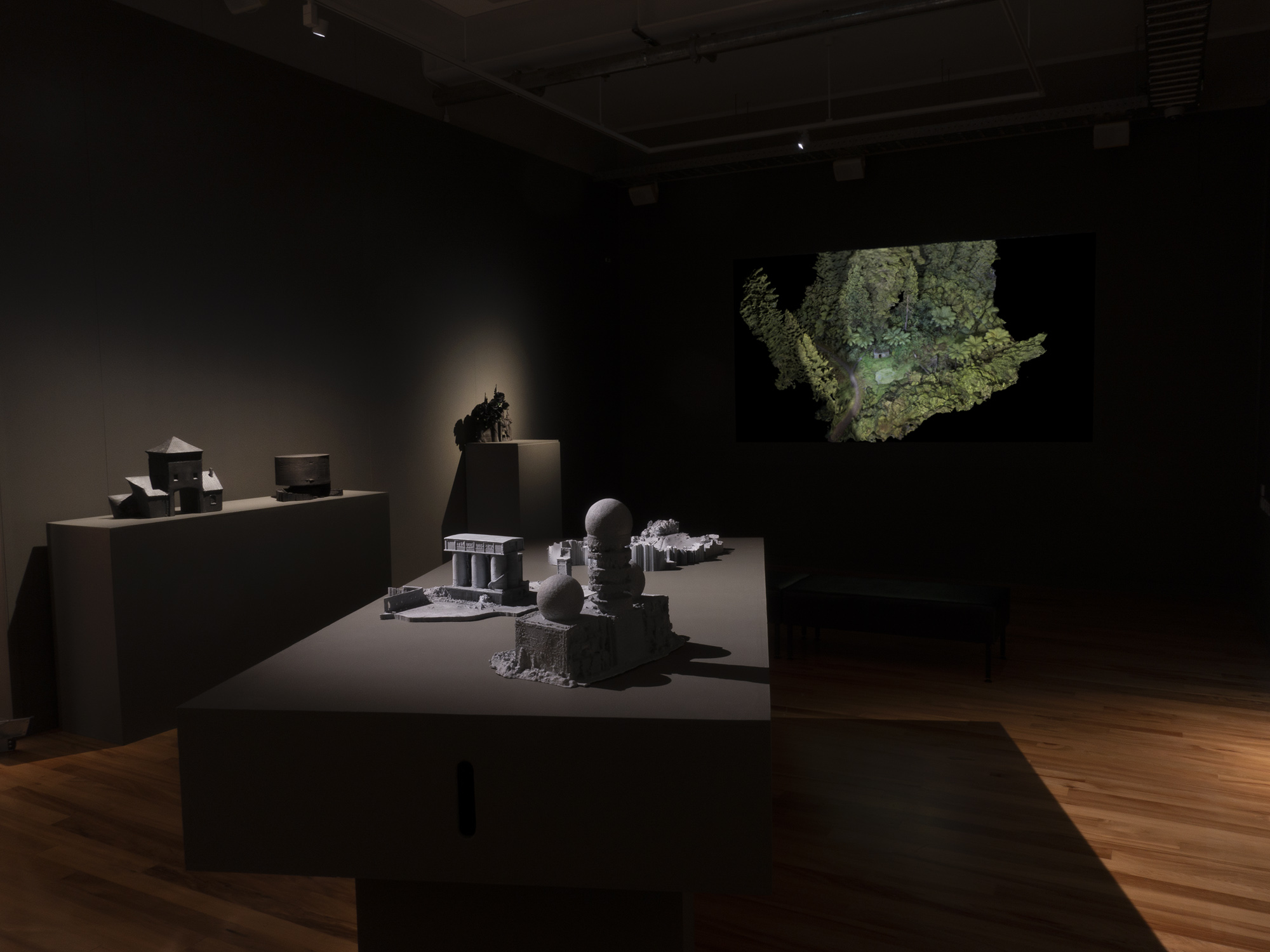
Ghost Zone, a video and digital sculpture installation at the Sargent Gallery, Whanganui, New Zealand, 2018

== Selected solo exhibitions ==
- How they Dream/The Gilded Age, The Scott Lawrie Gallery Auckland, NZ, 2022
- Blood River, Moon Roll and other Favourites at the Institut für Alles Mögliche/Stützpunkt Teufelsberg, Berlin, Germany, 2019
- Ghost Shelter 2016-2018 at the Sarjeant Gallery, Whanganui, New Zealand, 2018
- Ghost Shelter 17 at Te Uru, Titirangi, Auckland, New Zealand, 2017
- Ghost Shelter Berlin, Abteilung für Alles Andere, Berlin-Mitte, Germany, 2016
- The Happy Place at Sanderson Contemporary Art, Auckland, New Zealand, 2015
- Paradox of Plenty, Pah Homestead, TSB Bank Wallace Arts Centre, Auckland, New Zealand, 2013
- Don’t Worry, Be Happy, Mary Newton Gallery, Wellington, New Zealand, 2010
- Slow Train a Comin', NZ Film Archive -Pelorus Trust Mediagallery, Wellington, New Zealand 2007
- Rural Vignettes, video installation, Auckland NZ Film Archive Gallery, Auckland, New Zealand, 2006
- I have a Feeling We Are Not in Kansas Anymore Toto, Lopdell House, Auckland, New Zealand, 2005
- Following Gravity’s Rainbow, NZ Film Archive -Pelorus Trust Mediagallery, Wellington, New Zealand, 2005
- 3D Works: Signs ("and other similar entities"), Te Tuhi - The Mark, Pakuranga, Auckland, New Zealand, 2002

== Selected awards ==
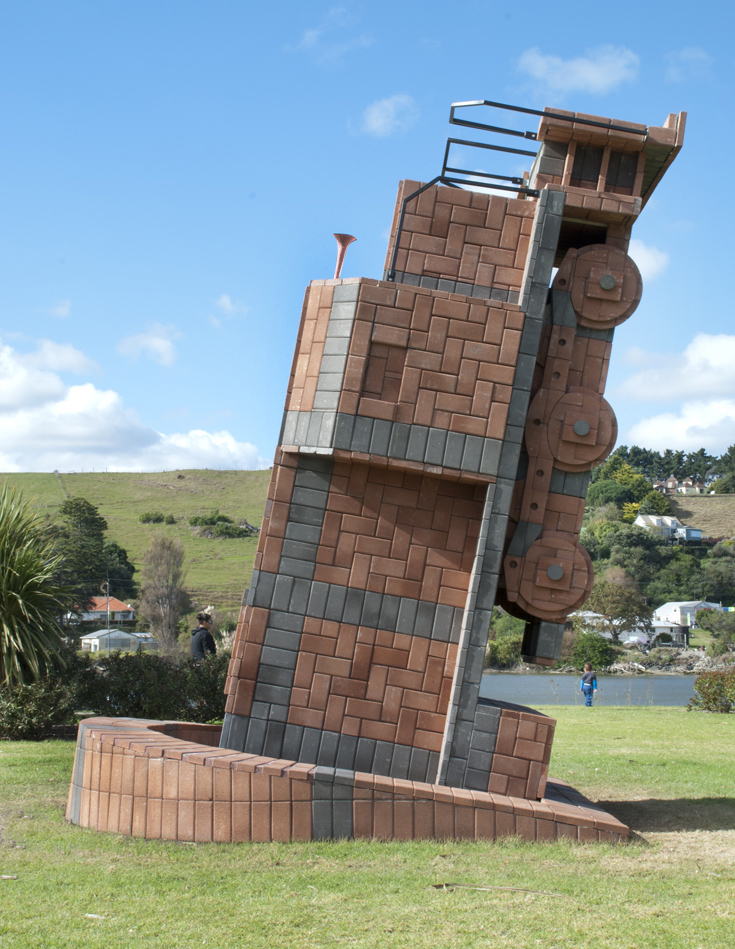
"Hear My Train a' Comin''" 2012

Bunkley has received numerous awards and grants for his sculpture and video, including the Rome Prize Fellowship at the American Academy in Rome 1985–86, the National Endowment for the Arts fellowship (1980).

- National Endowment for the Arts Fellowship, 1980
- C.A.P.S., Creative Artists Public Service, N.Y. State Artist Fellowship 1983
- New York State Council on the Arts (N.Y.S.C.A.), Project grant, 1984
- Rome Prize Fellowship, 1985 -1986
- Winner of the 2008/2009 Connells Bay Temporary Installation Project, Connell's Bay Sculpture Park, New Zealand, 2008
- Winner of Sculpture Whanganui, "Hear My Train a' Comin'", Whanganui, New Zealand, 2011
- Now&After 2012, 3rd prize, the Moscow Museum of Modern Art, 2012
- Sustainability Short Film Competition, second prize; UNCG and The Weatherspoon Art Museum, Gainsborough NC, USA, 2019
