= Konstantin Dimopoulos =

Sculptor

- Born: Constantin Dimopoulos; 20 December 1954 (age 71); Port Said, Egypt
- Education: Bachelor of Arts, Victoria University, Wellington, 1974; Chelsea School of Art, London, 1980s
- Known for: Kinetic sculpture, visual art and public installations
- Spouse: Adele Dimopoulos
- Awards: Civic Initiative Award for Sculpture of Wellington, New Zealand, 2002; Kinetic Art Organisation International Award for Public Kinetic Sculpture, 2004
- Website: www.kondimopoulos.com

Konstantin Dimopoulos (born 20 December 1954) is an artist known for kinetic sculpture and public installations. His best-known work, The Blue Trees, is an ongoing installation in which living trees are coloured with blue pigment to draw attention to deforestation.

== Early life ==
Dimopoulos was born in Port Said, Egypt, to Greek parents who both worked as tailors. When he was eight the family moved to Wellington, New Zealand, where his father’s sister lived, after nationalisation in Egypt had ended the demand for bespoke tailoring and made the country increasingly unsafe for them.

== Career ==
Dimopoulos investigates globally relevant questions related to ecology and the human condition, presented in temporary installations at public galleries, museums and outdoor sites throughout Australia and New Zealand, the United States, North America, Europe and Japan. His sculptures can be found in public spaces and private collections. Paintings, drawings and prints complement the spatial works.

After graduating from Victoria University of Wellington with a degree in sociology and psychology, Dimopoulos studied art at the Chelsea School of Art in London. His first exhibition, The Passioned (1981), was a series of linear oil paintings. A second solo exhibition followed before he travelled to Europe. Back in Wellington he exhibited Mind at the End of Its Tether (1989), dark figurative paintings of the men who worked in the printing room of the city’s daily newspaper.

He has been represented by the Conny Dietzschold Gallery in Sydney and has shown at art fairs in Cologne, Auckland and Melbourne. He received the inaugural Civic Initiative Award for Sculpture in Wellington in 2002 and the Kinetic Art Organisation's International Award for Public Kinetic Sculpture in 2004. The Blue Trees was named by TrendHunter among the top 100 activism trends of 2012 and was nominated for the INDEX: Award in 2013.

== Sculptures and public art ==
In the 1990s Dimopoulos began to explore the dynamics of form through the medium of sculpture. Beginning with his early works Dimopoulos experimented with the repetition of individual elements. Flexible shafts of carbon fibre became his new material of choice for purely linear, abstract kinetic sculptures that interact with the wind. His pared-down colour palette led to vivid colour choices in primarily monochromatic applications, also visible in the large-scale steel sculptures.

In 2001 he was commissioned by the Wellington Sculpture Trust to create "Pacific Grass", the first in the Meridian Energy Wind Sculpture Walk series. "Pacific Grass transforms a traffic island into a beacon of vertical bands of colour that undulate and pulsate with each gust of wind. Its resin rods harness and respond to the extremes of this site, making Pacific Grass memorable as it ushers the traffic around the circumference of the roundabout."

In 2004 Dimopoulos was invited to create the sculpture Kete for Connells Bay Centre for Sculpture on Waiheke Island, New Zealand. This was followed in 2005 by Red Ridge, a monumental sculpture for a private golf course in Arrowtown, New Zealand. Red Ridge caused controversy when the property owner had the work installed without first obtaining local government consent. In downtown Melbourne, Australia's busy Federation Square he installed Red Centre in 2006.

Dimopoulos has created sculptures for public and private collections in Australia, New Zealand, the United States and United Arab Emirates. Public art commissions in the United States include "Red Echo" (2010) in Palm Springs, California (2010), "Red Stix" at Home Plate Plaza, Seattle, Washington (2012), "Golden Field" at the Jean Oxley Public Service Center in Cedar Rapids, Iowa (2012) and "BLUE", at a private residential complex in Casa Mira, San Diego, California (2014). The Red Forest in Denver, USA was voted Westword's Best New Public Art 2011. "RED" was installed in the Middle East in Abu Dhabi, United Arab Emirates (2010).

Pacific Grass, 2001, Wellington, New Zealand

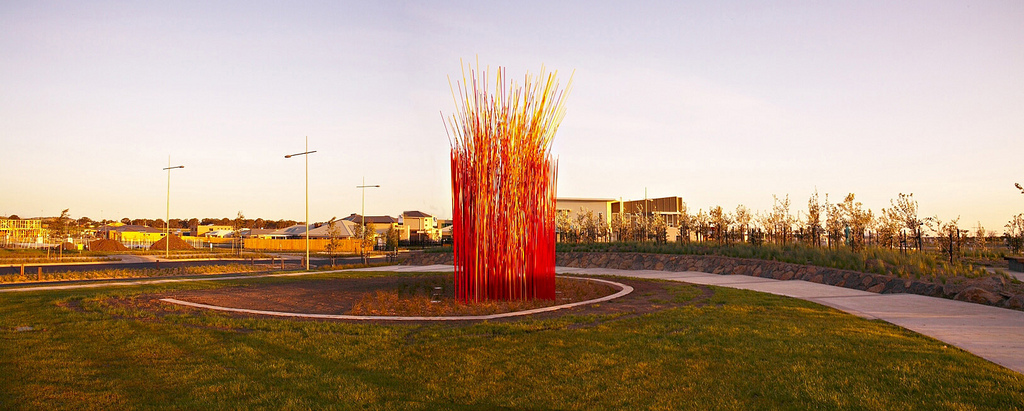
Colour Field 2007 Melbourne, Australia

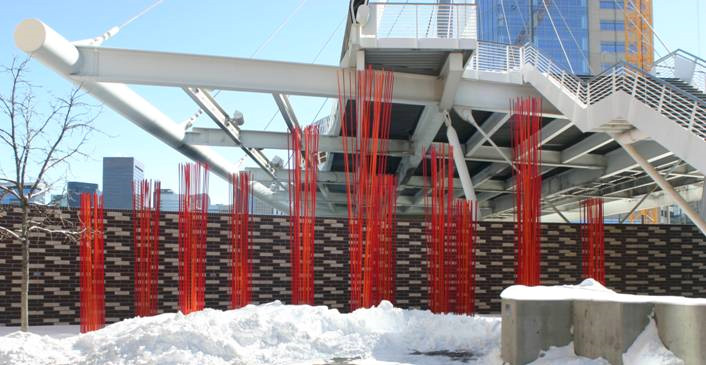
The Red Forest, 2010 Denver, USA

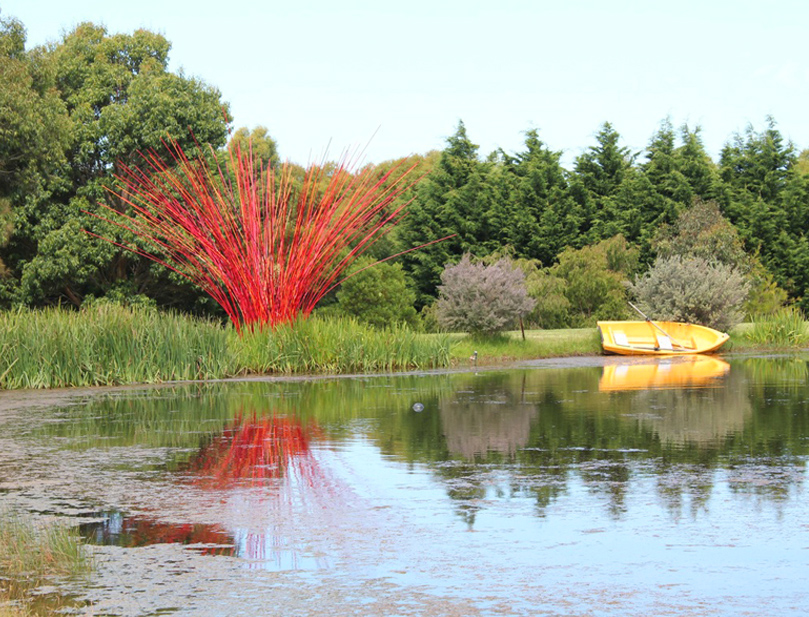
Alara, 2011 Flinders, Australia

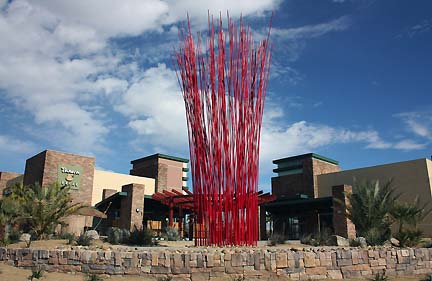
Red Echo 2011, Palm Springs, USA

== The Blue Trees ==
The Blue Trees, an ongoing environmental art installation about deforestation where the artist uses a vibrant blue to temporarily transform living trees into a surreal environment. Dimopoulos sees his The Blue Trees as an ephemeral performance art installation using transformation to provoke discussion about the issue of global deforestation. The Blue Trees is an ongoing project and has been realised in partnership with cultural and environmental organisations, cities and hundreds of volunteers. Stands of trees, either mature or saplings, are coloured with an environmentally safe, ultramarine blue pigment to call attention to global deforestation.

Chronology of The Blue Trees

- 2018 Currier Museum of Art, Manchester, NH USA
- 2016 Jacksonville Zoo, Jacksonville, FL USA
- 2015 Kuenzelsau Environment Installation at ZIEHL-ABEGG, Germany
- 2015 Vancouver Biennale, Canada
- 2013 City of London Festival, England
- 2013 Houston, Texas USA
- 2013 Atlanta, Georgia USA
- 2013 Albuquerque, New Mexico USA
- 2012 Sacramento, California USA
- 2012 Florida University, Gainesville, Florida USA
- 2012 Westlake Park, Seattle, Washington USA, and The Burke Gilman Trail, Kenmore, Washington USA
- 2011 Brick Bay Sculpture Trail, New Zealand
- 2011 Vancouver Biennale, Canada
- 2005 Sacred Grove – The Blue Forest, Afforestation Art Action, Melbourne, Australia
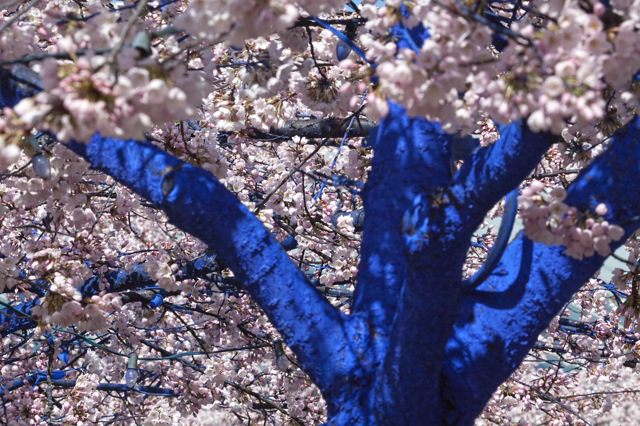
The Blue Trees, 2011 Vancouver Biennale, Canada

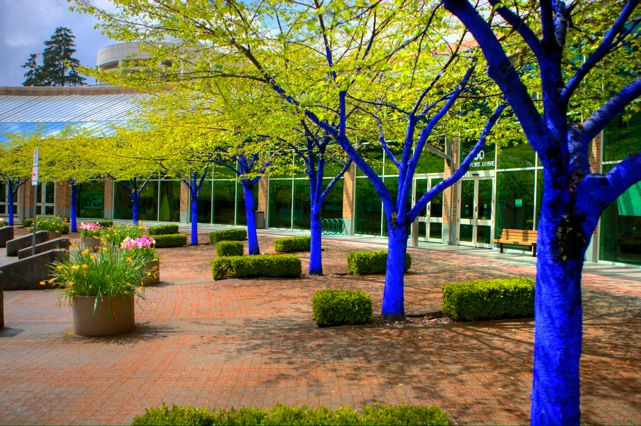
The Blue Trees, 2011 Vancouver Biennale, Canada

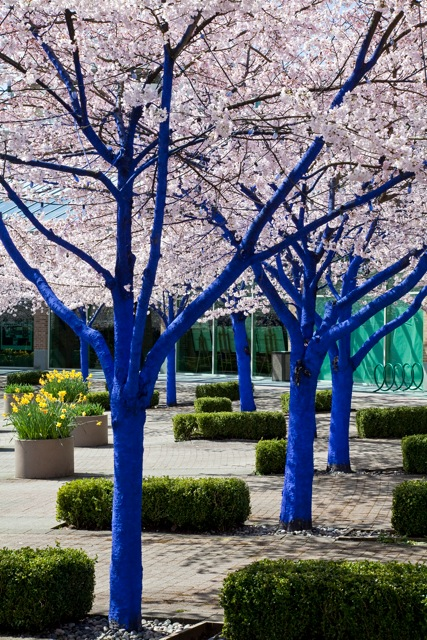
The Blue Trees, 2011 Vancouver Biennale, Canada

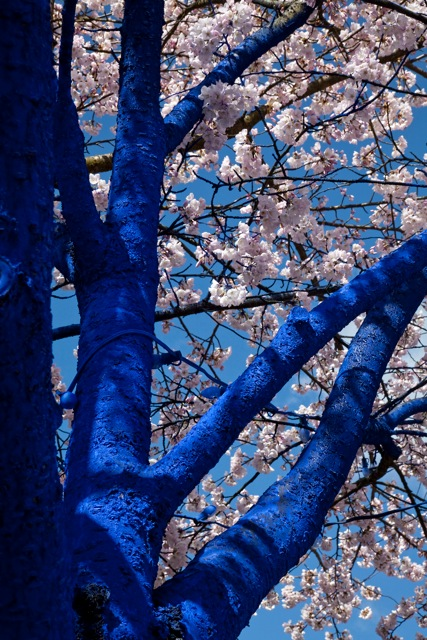
The Blue Trees, 2011 Vancouver Biennale, Canada

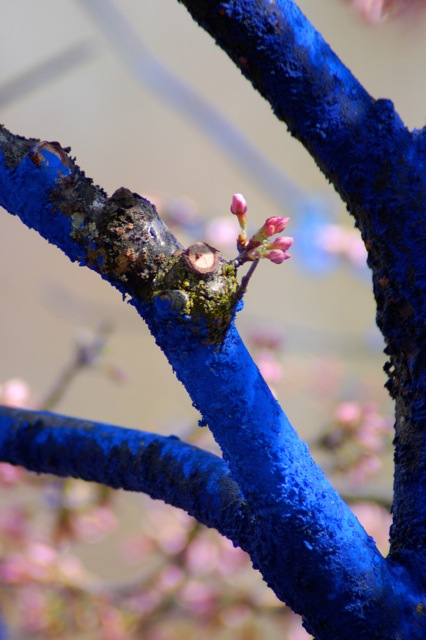
The Blue Trees, 2011 Vancouver Biennale, Canada

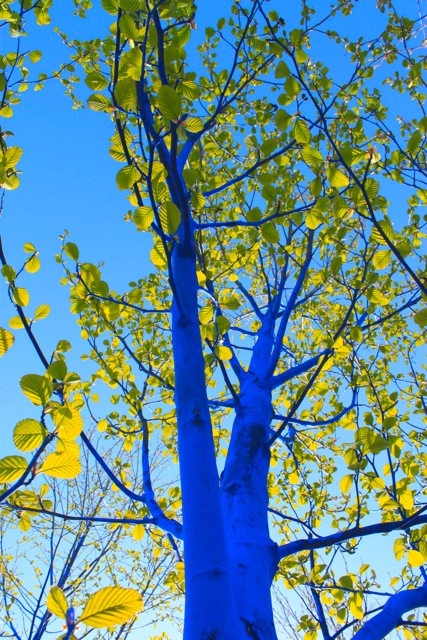
The Blue Trees, 2011 Vancouver Biennale, Canada

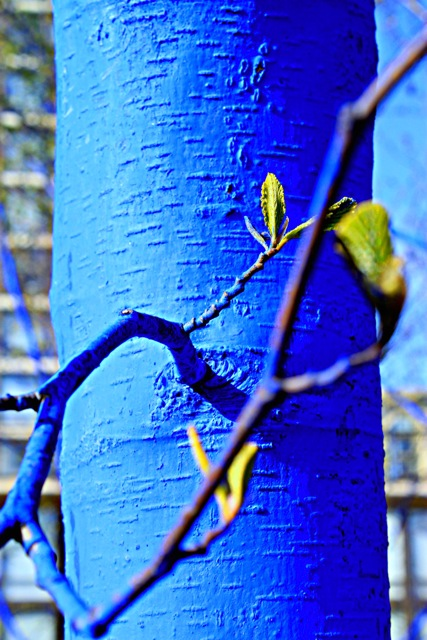
The Blue Trees, 2011 Vancouver Biennale, Canada

2916

== Installation art ==
Installations at public gallery and museum venues explore the state of contemporary civilisation in a global society. In New Zealand, Dimopoulos installed "Kroc and the Creation of the Big Byte" (The Physics Room, Christchurch 1997) in a visual essay that profiled the development of the McDonald's corporate image. "Level 4 – environmental ecocide" (Rotorua Museum of Art, 1997 and Manawatu Art Gallery, Palmerston North 1998) related to the highest degree of laboratory containment for experimenting with micro-biological organisms. "Works from a Savage Garden – environmental ecocide" (Suter Art Gallery, Nelson 1999) investigated the identity of a geographical virus by interpolating a correlation between humanity and gorse, a thorny invasive plant.

Installations in Australia highlighted cultural appropriation, realised in "Black Parthenon", an installation on cultural appropriation, presented 2009 as part of the Melbourne Festival of Light (Federation Square, Melbourne 2009). Birdcloud (Busan Biennale, Korea 2013) referenced the importance of social media within the context of global uprisings.

The Purple Rain is a textual and visual response to homelessness; and his light works continue this thematic exploration of social issues using a commercial advertising medium.
