= List of New Zealand artists =

The following is a list of New Zealand artists.

== A ==
- Airini A'Court (born 1953) – painter
- Brett a'Court (born 1968) – painter
- Zena Abbott (1922–1993) – weaver
- Caroline Abraham (1809–1877) – painter
- Laurence Aberhart (born 1949) – photographer
- Emily Acland (1830–1905) – pioneer settler and watercolour painter
- Avis Acres (1910–1994) – painter, illustrator, writer
- Laurence Aberhart (born 1949) – photographer
- Mark Adams (born 1949) – photographer
- Richard Adams (born 1957) – violinist and abstract painter
- Chrystabel Aitken (1904–2005) – sculptor and jeweller
- Florence Akins (1906–2012) – metalworker and textile artist
- Gretchen Albrecht (born 1943) – painter
- Peter Alger (born 1952) – ceramicist
- Jim Allen (1922–2023) – sculptor, carver and mixed media artist
- Edith Amituanai (born 1980) – photographer
- Gladys Anderson (19th century) – painter
- Hiria Anderson (born 1974) – painter
- Thomas Andrew (1855–1939) – photographer
- Rita Angus (1908–1970) – painter
- Billy Apple (1935–2021) – pop and conceptual artist
- Aina Apse (1926–2015) – potter
- Reweti Arapere (living) – illustrator, sculptor and painter
- Esther Archdall (1916–1999) – textile artist
- Mina Arndt (1885–1926) – painter
- Tanya Ashken (born 1939) – sculptor and jeweller
- Raewyn Atkinson (born 1955) – ceramicist
- Nabil Sabio Azadi (born 1991) – visual artist

== B ==
- John Badcock (born 1952) – contemporary artist
- Chris Bailey (born 1965) – sculptor and carver
- Whero O Te Rangi Bailey (1935–2016) – weaver and textile artist
- Kingsley Baird (living) – sculptor and designer
- Gertrude Ball (1879–1971) – wood engraver and painter
- Murray Ball (1939–2017) – cartoonist
- George Baloghy (born 1950) – painter
- William Bambridge (1820–1879) – photographer
- Ria Bancroft (1907–1993) – sculptor
- Barry Barclay (1944–2008) – filmmaker
- Nola Barron (born 1931) – potter
- Charles Decimus Barraud (1822–1897) – painter
- Paul Beadle (1917–1992) – sculptor and medallist
- Russell Beck (1941–2018) – sculptor and jade carver
- Richmond Beetham (1832–1912) – painter
- William Beetham (1809–1888) – portrait painter
- William J. Belcher (1883–1949) – painter
- Graham Bennett (born 1947) – sculptor
- Maurice Bennett (1957–2016) – toast artist
- Leo Bensemann (1912–1986) – illustrator, printer, typographer, publisher and editor
- Carlo Bergamini (1868–1934) – sculptor
- Pauline Bern (born 1952) – jeweller
- James Berry (1906–1979) – stamp and coin designer
- Phyllis Bethune (1899–1982) – painter
- Don Binney (1940–2012) – painter
- Vivien Bishop (born 1945) – painter
- Lisa Black (born 1982) – mixed media sculptor
- Margery Blackman (born 1930) – weaver
- Eden Bleazard (1855–1946) – painter
- Bessie Blomfield (1880–1984) – painter
- Charles Blomfield (1848–1926) – painter
- Constance Bolton (1884–1949) – painter
- Chris Booth (born 1948) – sculptor and installation artist
- Joe Bootham (1911–1986) – painter
- Levi Borgstrom (1919–2001) – woodturner
- Nigel Borell (born 1973) – Māori contemporary artist and curator
- Kobi Bosshard (born 1939) – jeweller
- Christine Boswijk (born 1939) – ceramicist
- James Boswell (1906–1971) – painter, cartoonist and draughtsman
- John Botica (born 1953) – pebble mosaic artist and designer
- Olivia Spencer Bower (1905–1982) – painter
- Violet Bowring (1890–1980) – painter, miniaturist
- Walter Armiger Bowring (1874–1931) – painter and illustrator
- Arthur Merric Boyd (1862–1940) – painter
- George Boyd (1825–1886) – potter
- Joanna Braithwaite (born 1962) – painter
- Brian Brake (1927–1988) – photographer
- William Brassington (1801–1905) – stonemason and sculptor
- Jane Brenkley (1882–1973) – painter, wood carver and embroiderer
- Stella Brennan (born 1974) – installation artist
- Louie Bretaña (born 1967) – multi-media artist and painter
- Barry Brickell (1935–2016) – potter
- Freda Brierley (born 1942) – weaver
- Matahi Brightwell (born 1952) – master carver
- Tungane Broadbent (born 1940) – tivaevae / tivaivai artist
- Greg Broadmore (born 1972) – concept designer and sculptor
- David Brokenshire (1925–2014) – ceramicist
- Jude Broughan (born 1976) – mixed media artist
- Cath Brown (1933–2004) – weaver and ceramicist
- Helen Brown (1917–1986) – painter
- Nigel Brown (born 1949) – painter
- Pelenakeke Brown – multi-disciplinary artist
- Peter Brown (1921–2005) – painter
- Kathleen Browne (1905–2007) – painter
- Mary-Louise Browne (born 1957) – text-based conceptual artist
- Annie Buckhurst (1894–1959) – metalwork artist
- Jessie Buckland (1878–1939) – photographer
- Emily Valentine Bullock – jeweller and creator of wearable art
- Brit Bunkley (born 1955) – sculptor, installation artist and digital/video artist
- Fanny Buss (1910–1986) – textile artist, fashion designer, printmaker and book illustrator
- Debra Bustin (born 1957) – visual artist
- Maude Burge (1865–1957) – painter
- Sulieti Fieme'a Burrows (born 1951) – tapa cloth artist
- Mirranda Burton (born 1973) – printmaker and graphic novel illustrator
- Grace Butler (1886–1962) – painter
- Margaret Butler (1883–1947) – sculptor

== C ==
- Helen Calder (born 1955) – painter
- Emma Camden (born 1966) – glassworker
- Corrie Cameron (1904–1993) – printmaker and painter
- Donna Campbell (born 1959) – curator, weaver and textile artist
- Jenny Campbell (1895–1970) – painter
- Rosemary Campbell (born 1941) – painter
- Ida Carey (1891–1982) – painter and art teacher
- Steve Carr – video artist, sculptor and photographer
- Len Castle (1924–2011) – potter
- Ruth Castle (born 1931) – weaver
- Tim Chadwick (1962–2010) – painter and mixed media artist
- Vera Chapman (1885–1953) – painter
- Chris Charteris (born 1966) – jeweller
- Ellen Cheeseman (1848–1928) – painter and botanist
- Chen Weiming (born c. 1980) – sculptor
- Garth Chester (1916–1968) – furniture designer
- Madeleine Child (born 1959) – ceramicist
- Raymond Ching (born 1939) – painter
- Liyen Chong (born 1979) – embroiderer, ceramacist and printmaker
- Bessie Christie (1904–1983) – painter
- Joseph Churchward (1932–2013) – graphic designer and typographer
- Philip Clairmont (1949–1984) – painter
- Fiona Clark (born 1954) – photographer
- Russell Clark (1905–1966) – illustrator and sculptor
- Frank Edward Clarke (1849–1899) – scientific illustrator
- Tangimoe Clay (born 1960) – weaver and textile artist
- Betty Clegg (1926–2009) – watercolour painter
- James Coe (1917–2003) – industrial designer and painter
- Edith Collier (1885–1964) – painter
- Alice Beville Collins (1884–1973) – silversmith
- William Cooch (1898–1950) – stamp designer, printmaker, calligrapher and architect
- Octavia Cook (born 1978) – jeweller
- Jim Cooper (born 1956) – ceramicist
- Dale Copeland (born 1943) – collage and assemblage artist
- Ivy Copeland (1888–1961) – painter
- Stella Corkery (born 1960) – painter
- Paerau Corneal (born 1961) – ceramicist
- Bronwynne Cornish (born 1945) – ceramicist, sculptor, educator
- Frederick Daniel Cornwell (1875–1948) – painter
- Shane Cotton (born 1964) – painter
- Roy Cowan (1918–2006) – ceramicist and printmaker
- Helen Crabb (1891–1972) – pen and ink artist, painter and art teacher
- John Crichton (1917–1993) – furniture and interior designer
- Gordon Crook (1921–2011) – visual artist
- Bill Culbert (1935–2019) – painter, photographer, sculptor and installation artist
- Ann Culy (born 1952) – jeweller
- Vera Cummings (1891–1949) – painter
- Betty Curnow (1911–2005) – painter and printmaker

== D ==
- Philip Dadson (born 1946) – media artist
- Lily Daff (1885–1945) – painter and illustrator
- Andrea Daly (born 1965) – jeweller
- Judy Darragh (born 1957) – sculpture/installation
- Shona Rapira Davies (born 1951) – sculptor and painter
- May Davis (1914–1995) – ceramicist
- Neil Dawson (born 1948) – sculptor
- Melvin Day (1923–2016) – painter and scholar
- Eileen Olive Deste (1909–1986) – photographer
- Pip Devonshire (born 1966) – weaver
- Fran Dibble (born 1962) – painter and sculptor
- Paul Dibble (born 1943) – sculptor
- Ngila Dickson (born 1958) – costume designer
- Konstantin Dimopoulos (born 1954) – sculptor and visual artist
- Owen Dippie (living) – muralist and street artist
- Lynley Dodd (born 1941) – children's book illustrator
- John Drawbridge (1930–2005) – muralist
- Don Driver (1930–2011) – painter, sculptor and collage-maker/assemblist
- Andrew Drummond (born 1951) – painter and sculptor
- Sam Duckor-Jones (born 1982) – sculptor and poet
- Alison Duff (1914–2000) – sculptor
- Davina Duke (born 1975) – ceramics artist
- Joan Dukes (1903–1993) – illustrator
- Sarah Dutt (living) – mixed media artist
- Dagmar Dyck (born 1972) – printmaker and painter
- Rona Dyer (1923–2021) – painter and wood-engraver

== E ==
- Audrey Eagle (1925–2022) – botanical illustrator
- Gay Eaton (1933–2017) – textile artist
- John Edgar (1950–2021) – sculptor and medallist
- Leon van den Eijkel (1940–2021) – sculptor and painter
- Frances Dolina Ellis (1900–1971) – artist, printmaker and teacher
- Frederick Vincent Ellis (1892–1961) – stained glass artist and art teacher
- Lorna Ellis (1903–1981) – sculptor and ceramist
- Martin Emond (1969–2004) – cartoon illustrator and painter
- Jane Evans (1946–2012) – painter
- Claudia Pond Eyley (born 1946) – painter, filmmaker

== F ==
- Jacqueline Fahey (born 1929) – painter and writer
- Richard Fairgray (born 1985) – author and illustrator
- Lusi Faiva – stage performer and dancer
- David Farquhar (1928–2007) – composer
- Nicola Farquhar (born 1972) – painter
- Joan Fear (1932–2022) – painter
- William Henry Feldon (1871–1945) – sculptor and monumental mason
- Charles Fell (1844–1918) – painter
- Fatu Feu'u (born 1946) – painter
- Irene Ferguson (born 1970) – portrait painter
- Di Ffrench (1946–1999) – photographic and performance artist
- Ivy Fife (1905–1976) – painter
- George Finey (1895–1987) – sketch artist, illustrator and painter
- Charlotte Fisher (born 1959) – sculptor
- John Nugent Fitch (1840–1927) – botanical illustrator and lithographer
- Fane Flaws (1951–2021) – painter, musician and multimedia artist
- Frances Fletcher (1846–1935) – painter
- Tony Fomison (1939–1990) – painter
- Luise Fong (born 1964) – abstract painter and educator
- Selina Foote (born 1985) – painter
- Tabatha Forbes (born 1972) – painter and textiles artist
- John Bevan Ford (1930–2005) – artist
- Patricia France (1911–1995) – abstract artist
- Margaret Frankel (1902–1997) – painter, potter, printmaker and art teacher
- Jacqueline Fraser (born 1956) – sculptor and installation artist
- Warwick Freeman (born 1953) – jeweller
- Marti Friedlander (1928–2016) – photographer
- Karl Fritsch (born 1963) – jeweller
- Dick Frizzell (born 1943) – printmaker, painter
- Hester Frood (1882–1971) – painter and printmaker
- Clive Fugill (born 1949) – wood carver
- Elizabeth Fuller (born 1957) – illustrator
- Steve Fullmer (born 1946) – ceramicist

== G ==
- Joanne Gair (born c.1958) – make-up artist
- Briar Gardner (1879–1968) – ceramicist
- Rosalie Gascoigne (1917–1999) – sculptor and assemblage artist
- Regan Gentry (born 1976) – sculptor
- Ian George (1952–2015) – sculptor and painter
- Kay George (born 1954) – painter
- May Gilbert (1901–1977) – printmaker and painter
- John Alexander Gilfillan (1793–1864) – painter
- Lloyd Godman (1952–2023) – photographer and environmental artist
- Katie Gold – potter
- Suzanne Goldberg (1940–1999) – painter
- Charles Goldie (1870–1947) – painter
- Roy Good (born 1945) – painter
- Edmund Gouldsmith (1852–1932) – painter
- Star Gossage (born 1973) – painter
- Kohai Grace (born 1966) – weaver
- Joan Gragg (born 1943) – sculptor and painter
- Brett Graham (born 1967) – sculptor
- Charlotte Graham (born 1972) – painter
- Lyonel Grant (born 1957) – carver and sculptor
- Aston Greathead (1921–2012) – artist
- Ayesha Green (born 1987) – painter and sculptor
- Harriet Greenwood (1869-1948) - botanical illustrator
- Sarah Greenwood (1809–1889) – painter
- James Greig (1936–1986) – potter
- William Griffin (c.1811–1870) – painter
- Richard Gross (1882–1964) – sculptor
- John Gully (1819–1888) – painter

== H ==
- Robert Hague (born 1967) – sculptor and printmaker
- Alison Hale (born 1954/1955) – painter
- Caley Hall (born 1975) – painter
- Bill Hammond (1947–2021) – painter
- Pat Hanly (1932–2004) – painter
- Amy Merania Harper (1900–1998) – photographer
- Emily Cumming Harris (1836–1925) – painter
- Jeffrey Harris (born 1949) – painter
- Malcolm Harrison (1941–2007) – textile artist
- Christine Harvey (living) – tā moko artist
- Kenneth Hassall (1902–1970) – printmaker
- Niki Hastings-McFall (born 1959) – artist and jeweller
- Rhona Haszard (1901–1931) – painter
- Charles Heaphy (1820–1881) – painter
- Christine Hellyar (born 1947) – sculptor and installation artist
- Des Helmore (born 1940) – biological illustrator
- Kennaway Henderson (1879–1960) – illustrator and cartoonist
- Louise Henderson (1902–1994) – painter
- Rangimārie Hetet (1892–1995) – weaver
- Veranoa Hetet (born 1966) – weaver
- Georgina Burne Hetley (1832–1898) – painter
- Avis Higgs (1918–2016) – textile designer
- Mabel Hill (1872–1956) – painter
- Roland Hipkins (1894–1951) – painter and woodcutter
- Gavin Hitchings (born 1937) – jeweller
- Bessie Hocken (1848–1933) – painter and photographer
- Frances Hodgkins (1869–1947) – painter
- W. M. Hodgkins (1833–1898) – painter
- Ola and Marie Höglund (born 1956, born 1955) – glass artists
- Katherine McLean Holmes (1849–1925) – painter
- Julian Hooper (born 1966) – painter
- Esther Studholme Hope (1885–1975) – painter
- Gabrielle Hope (1916–1962) – painter
- Jean Horsley (1913–1997) – painter
- Ralph Hotere (1931–2013) – painter, educator
- Charles Howorth (1856–1945) – painter
- Eleanor Hughes (1882–1959) – painter
- Alexis Hunter (1948–2014) – contemporary painter, photographer
- Mary Young Hunter (1872–1947) – painter

== I ==
- Ruth Ige (born 1992) – painter
- Humphrey Ikin (born 1957) – furniture designer
- Ioane Ioane (born 1962) – performance artist, filmmaker, painter, installation artist and sculptor
- Wilfrid Nelson Isaac (1893–1972) – jeweller, enameller, metalworker and art school director
- Ana Iti (born 1989) – contemporary artist working with sculpture, video and text
- Tāme Iti (born 1952) – performance and installation artist, painter and sculptor

== J ==
- Nicola Jackson (born 1960) – painter
- Linda James (born 1951) – painter
- Helen Varley Jamieson (born 1966) – digital media artist, writer
- Eana Jeans (1890–1986) – painter
- Ellen Jeffreys (1827–1904) – painter
- Dorothy Jenkin (1892–1995) – painter
- Megan Jenkinson (born 1958) – photographer
- Jess Johnson (born 1979) – drawer, animator
- Nina Jones (1871–1926) – painter

== K ==
- Robyn Kahukiwa (born c. 1938-2025) – painter and illustrator
- Emily Karaka (born 1952) – painter
- Annie Elizabeth Kelly (1877–1946) – portrait painter
- Felix Runcie Kelly (1914–1994) – painter, muralist, cartoonist
- Robyn E. Kenealy (born 1983) – comic creator
- Bob Kerr (born 1951) – painter
- Richard Killeen (born 1946) – painter
- Martha King (1803–1897) – painter
- Susan Te Kahurangi King (born 1951) – pencil/ink
- Rangi Kipa (born 1966) – sculptor and carver
- Te Rongo Kirkwood (active since 2000s) – glass designer
- Tom Kreisler (1938-2002) – painter and poet
- Tony Kuepfer (born 1947) – glass artist
- Denise Kum (born 1968) – artist

== L ==
- Sarah Laing (born 1973) – cartoonist and author
- Lily Laita (1969–2023) – painter
- Maureen Lander (born 1942) – weaver and installation artist
- Peter Lange (1802–1884) – ceramicist
- Daisy Le Cren (1881–1951) – painter
- Rozana Lee (born 1970) – artist
- Yona Lee (born 1986) – installation artist
- Saskia Leek (born 1970) – painter
- Andy Leleisi'uao (born 1969) – painter
- Karl Leonard (born 1964) – carver and weaver
- Ranginui Parewahawaha Leonard (1872–1984) – weaver
- Janet Lilo (born 1982) – digital photography, video, and multimedia artist
- Gottfried Lindauer (1839–1926) – painter
- Bridie Lonie (born 1951/2) – painter, academic and arts writer
- Ida Mary Lough (1903–1985) – weaver
- Nikole Lowe (born 1973) – tattoo artist
- Cheryl Lucas (born 1954) – ceramicist
- Caroline Lush (1854–1945) – painter
- Phillip Luxton (born 1959) – ceramicist
- Len Lye (1901–1980) – sculptor, experimental film maker
- Julia Lynch (1896–1975) – portrait artist
- Vivian Lynn (1931–2018) – sculptor, paper and installation artist

== M ==
- Douglas MacDiarmid (1922–2020) – painter
- Molly Macalister (1920–1979) – sculptor
- Jeanne Macaskill (1931–2014) – painter
- Rhea Maheshwari (born 1993) – painter
- Tanja McMillan (Misery) (born 1982) – graffiti artist, painter, sculptor
- Allen Maddox (1948–2000) – painter
- Marian Maguire (born 1962) – lithographer
- Sam Mahon (born 1950) – sculptor
- Toi Te Rito Maihi (born 1937) – weaver
- Catherine Manchester (born 1957) – painter
- Dorothy Manning (1919–2012) – painter
- Edgar Mansfield (1907–1996) – bookbinder
- Owen Mapp (born 1945) – carver and sculptor
- Lina Marsh (born 1972/73) – multidisciplinary artist and musician
- Sylvia Marsters (born 1963) – painter
- Josiah Martin (1843–1916) – photographer
- Mata Aho Collective (formed 2012) – mixed-media artists
- Karl Maughan (born 1964) – painter
- Liz Maw (born 1966) – painter
- Colin McCahon (1919–1987) – painter, museum curator, teacher
- Elizabeth McClure (born 1957) – glass artist
- Caroline McQuarrie (born 1975) – photographer, textile artist
- Shona McFarlane (1929–2001) – painter
- Royce McGlashen (born 1949) – ceramicist
- Mary McIntyre (born 1928) – painter
- Peter McIntyre (1910–1995) – painter
- Raymond McIntyre (1879–1933) – artist and art critic
- Matthew McIntyre-Wilson (born 1973) – jeweller
- Lois McIvor (1930–2017) – painter
- Rachael McKenna (born 1950) – photographer
- Tui McLauchlan (1915–2004) – painter
- Sarah Ann McMurray (1848–1943) – woodcarver
- Ellen von Meyern (died c. 1912) – portrait painter
- Judy Millar (born 1957) – painter
- Marjory Mills (1896–1987) – watercolour painter, embroidery designer
- Margaret Milne (1917–2005) – ceramicist
- Sofia Minson (born 1984) – painter
- Merata Mita (1942–2010) – filmmaker
- Shona Moller – painter
- Tim Molloy – cartoonist
- Muriel Carrick Moody (1907–1991) – sculptor, ceramist
- Bev Moon – artist
- Geoff Moon (1915–2009) – photographer
- Peg Moorhouse (1917–2024) – weaver and artist
- Julia Morison (born 1952) – multidisciplinary artist
- Edith Emily Morris (1895–1965) – jewellery designer, silversmith
- Robin Morrison (1944–1993) – photographer
- Elise Mourant (1921–1990) – painter
- Milan Mrkusich (1925–2018) – painter
- Marianne Muggeridge (born 1952) – painter and screenprinter
- Michel Mulipola (born 1981) – comic artist
- Selwyn Muru (1937–2024) – painter, sculptor and film/broadcasting

== N ==
- James Nairn (1859–1904) – painter
- Manos Nathan (1948–2015) – ceramicist
- Chester Nealie (born 1942) – ceramicist
- G. P. Nerli (1860–1926) – painter
- Indira Neville (born 1973) – comics artist
- Kate Newby (born 1979) – installation artist
- Guy Ngan (1926–2017) – painter and sculptor
- Peter Nicholls (1936–2021) – sculptor
- Jan Nigro (1919–2012) – painter
- Buck Nin (1942–1996) – artist
- Shannon Novak (born 1979) – artist, curator

== O ==
- Nina Oberg Humphries (born 1990) – sculpture, photographer
- Kate Ogston (1852–1916) – painter
- Alfred Henry O'Keeffe (1858–1941) – artist
- Ani O'Neill (born 1971) – artist
- Richard Orjis (born 1979) – artist
- Daisy Osborn (1888–1957) – painter, illustrator, jewellery designer
- Rona Ngahuia Osborne (born 1974) – painter, textile and clothing artist

== P ==
- Pacific Sisters – collective of artists, performers, fashion designers, jewellers and musicians
- Evelyn Margaret Page (1899–1988) – painter
- Alvin Pankhurst (1949-2024) – painter
- Fiona Pardington (born 1961) – photographer
- Michael Parekowhai (born 1968) – sculptor
- John Parker (born 1947) – ceramicist
- J. S. Parker (1944–2017) – painter
- Richard Parker (born 1946) – ceramicist
- Reuben Paterson (born 1973) – artist
- Tania Patterson (born 1969) – jeweller
- Joanna Paul (1945–2003) – visual artist, poet, filmmaker
- Ruth Paul (born 1964) – children's writer, illustrator
- Edward William Payton (1859–1944) – photographer and painter
- Johnny Penisula (born 1941) – artist
- Graham Percy (1938–2008) – artist, illustrator
- Patricia Charlotte Perrin (1921–1988) – potter
- Juliet Peter (1915–2010) – ceramicist, illustrator, printmaker, painter
- Margot Philips (1902–1988) – painter
- Séraphine Pick (born 1964) – painter
- Judy Pickard (1921–2016) – painter
- Kim Pieters (born 1959) – painter, musician and digital filmmaker
- Molima Molly Pihigia (born 1950/51) – weaver
- Ada May Plante (1875–1950) – painter
- Philip Robert Presants (1867–1942) – chromolithographer
- Alan Preston (born 1941) – jeweller
- Phil Price (born 1965) – sculptor
- Diane Prince (born 1952) – painter, weaver, installation art practitioner and set designer
- John Pule (born 1962) – artist, writer
- Erenora Puketapu-Hetet (1941–2006) – weaver, writer

== R ==
- Rachael Rakena (born 1969) – digital artist
- Tia Ranginui – photographer based in Whanganui
- Rosanna Raymond (born 1967) – installation artist, poet, and cultural commentator
- Lisa Reihana (born 1964) – photographer, digital artist, installation artist
- Rangimahora Reihana-Mete (1899–1993) – weaver
- Bridget Reweti (active since 2000s) – photographer and moving image artist
- Kura Te Waru Rewiri (born 1950) – painter, educator
- Pauline Rhodes (born 1937) – sculptor, photographer and installation artist
- Gwyneth Richardson (1896–1980), watercolour artist
- Dolla Richmond (1861–1935) – painter
- Baye Riddell (born 1950) – ceramicist
- Martyn Roberts (born 1965/6) – lighting and set designer and photographer
- Dorothy Robertson (died 1979) – painter
- Horatio Gordon Robley (1840–1930) – 19th-century sketch artist and watercolourist
- Helen Rockel (born 1949) – painter
- Charles Rose (1921–2017) – painter
- Rick Rudd (born 1949) – ceramicist
- Yvonne Rust (1922–2002) – potter and painter
- Frances Rutherford (1912–2006) – painter

== S ==
- Raymond Sagapolutele (born 1971) – photographer
- Kathleen Salmond (1895–1946) – painter
- E. Rosa Sawtell (1865–1940) – painter
- Theo Schoon (1915–1985) – painter, carver, photographer
- Emily Schuster (1927–1997) – weaver
- Ian Scott (1945–2013) – painter
- Alfred Sharpe (1836–1908) – 19th-century painter
- Joe Sheehan (born 1976) – jeweller
- Carole Shepheard (born 1945) – printmaker
- Maud Winifred Sherwood (1880–1956) – painter
- Jeena Shin (born 1973) – painter
- Emily Siddell (born 1971) – mixed-media artist
- Peter Siddell (1935–2011) – 20th-century painter
- Sylvia Siddell (1941–2011) – painter
- Freda Simmonds (1912–1983) – painter
- Tiffany Singh (born 1978) – installation artist
- Susan Skerman (born 1928) – painter
- Yvonne Sloan (born 1941) – weaver, textile artist
- Michael Smither (born 1939) – painter and sculptor
- Katherine Smyth – ceramicist
- Ella Spicer (1876–1958) – painter
- Peggy Spicer (1908–1984) – painter
- John Calcott St Quentin (fl. 1863–1869) – painter, designer and workers' advocate
- Vida Steinert (1906–1999) – painter
- Elizabeth Stevens (1923–2008) – painter
- Helen Stewart (1900–1983) – painter
- Peter Stichbury (born 1969) – 20th-century painter
- Justin Summerton (born 1968) – painter
- Grahame Sydney (born 1948) – 20th-century painter

== T ==
- Wi Taepa (born 1946) – ceramicist
- Suzanne Tamaki – artist
- Yuk King Tan (born 1971) – artist
- Mahiriki Tangaroa (born 1973) – painter
- Tuāfale Tanoa’i – videographer & multi media
- Alfred James Tattersall (1861–1951) – photographer
- Mary Taylor (born 1948) – painter and etcher
- Saffronn Te Ratana (born 1975) – painter
- Barry Thomas (born 1955) - artist and filmmaker
- Ernest Heber Thompson (1891–1971) – painter
- Pauline Thompson (1942–2012) – painter
- Ray Thorburn (1937–2023) – painter and arts educator
- Te Wharetoroa Tiniraupeka, (1863–1964), weaver
- Yvonne Todd (born 1973) – photographer
- Mollie Tripe (1870–1939) – painter
- Philip Trusttum (born 1940) – painter
- Michel Tuffery (born 1966) – artist
- Telly Tuita (born 1980) – multi-media artist and painter
- Merylyn Tweedie (born 1953) – multi-media artist
- Marion Tylee (1900–1981) – painter
- Pati Solomona Tyrell (born 1992) – multi-media artist
- Ana Tzarev (born 1937) – artist, businesswoman

== U ==
- Francis Upritchard (born 1976) – sculptor and installation artist
- Colleen Waata Urlich (1939–2015) – ceramicist

== V ==
- Juliet Valpy (1835–1911) – painter
- Petrus van der Velden (1837–1913) – painter
- Ronnie van Hout (born 1962) – New Zealand artist
- Bianca van Rangelrooy (born 1959) – painter, sculptor
- Erica van Zon (born 1979) – ceramicist
- Lesley Vanderwalt (active 2010s) – hair designer, make-up artist
- Kathleen Vane (1891–1965) – painter

== W ==
- Taika Waititi (born 1975) – visual artist and filmmaker
- Lisa Walker (born 1967) – jeweller
- Edith Wall (1904–2012) – painter
- Elizabeth Wallwork (1883–1969) – painter
- Gordon Walters (1919–1995) – artist and graphic designer
- Emma Maria Walrond (1859–1943) – painter
- Enga Washbourn (1908–1988) – painter
- Harry Watson (born 1965) – carver and sculptor
- Ruth Watson (born 1962) – photographer, sculptor, painter, installation artist and academic
- Alice Waymouth (1884–1963) – metalworker and artist
- Chris Weaver (born 1956) – ceramicist
- Ben Webb (1976–2014) – painter
- Marilynn Webb (1937–2021) – printmaker, painter
- Christine Webster (born 1958) – visual artist and photographer
- Frank Weitzel (1905–1932) – printmaker and sculptor
- Tao Wells – community conceptualist
- Ans Westra (1936–2023) – photographer
- Annie Julia White (1852–1932) – painter
- Jonathan White (1938–2021) – painter
- Robin White (born 1946) — painter, printmaker
- Violet Whiteman (1873–1952) – painter
- Alice Whyte (1885–1952) – painter
- Areta Wilkinson (born 1969) – jeweller
- Howard Williams (born 1935) – ceramicist and art writer
- Arnold Manaaki Wilson (1928-2012) – contemporary sculptor
- Judy McIntosh Wilson (born 1937) – sculptor and installation artist
- Mary Wirepa (1904–1971) – painter
- Christina Wirihana (born 1949) – weaver
- Merilyn Wiseman (1941–2019) – ceramicist
- Brent Wong (born 1945) – surrealist painter
- Sina Woolcott (1907–2003) – potter
- Toss Woollaston (1910–1998) – painter
- Benjamin Work (born 1979) – sculptor, painter
- Douglas Wright (1956–2018) – dancer, choreographer
- Walter Wright (1866–1933) – painter
- Robert Henry Wynyard (1802–1864) – painter

== Y ==
- Pauline Yearbury (1926–1977) – Māori modernist artist
- Charlotte Youmans (1869–1957) – painter
- Wayne Youle (born 1974) – contemporary multi-media artist
- Adele Younghusband (1878–1969) – artist and photographer

== Z ==
- Beth Zanders (1913–2009) – painter

== See also ==
- List of New Zealand women artists
- New Zealand art
