= Jeena =

Jeena may refer to:

- Jeenmata or Jeena Mata (lit. 'Life Mother'), a Hindu deity of Rajasthan, India
- P. S. Jeena, Indian basketballer
- Surendra Singh Jeena, Indian politician
- Jeena Shin, New Zealand artist born in Seoul, South Korea
- Jeena, the Cantonese pronunciation of the derogatory word Shina

== See also ==
- "Jeena Jeena" (lit. 'Live Live'), a 2015 Indian Hindi-language song
