= Brett a'Court =

New Zealand artist

Brett Ramon a'Court
- Born: 15 March 1968 (age 58); Christchurch, New Zealand
- Education: Glendowie College
- Occupation: Artist
- Known for: Painting
- Spouse: Rachel a'Court
- Children: 2
- Website: http://www.brettacourt.com/

Brett a'Court (born 1968) is a New Zealand artist who has lived and painted in Waipu, Northland since 1995, and exhibits regularly in New Zealand, including 12 solo exhibitions between 2002 and 2024. His work can be found in both private and public collections throughout the country.

== Early life ==
A'Court was born in Christchurch, New Zealand, in 1968, and went to school in the Auckland suburb of Glendowie. He moved to rural, coastal Waipu in 1995 after he married, and worked in ceramics and painted, mostly in oils.

== Work ==
A'Court's first solo show was called Lectio Divina, and was exhibited at the Letham Gallery, in Ponsonby, Auckland in 2002. It sold well and he left his ceramics job to paint full time.

A'Court struggled financially for the next four years. He said as a Christian he trusted in God, and channelled his fears and sacrifices into his work. Influenced by Colin McCahon's major works, Renaissance icons and other iconography, a'Court looked at the human figure and beyond to our "spiritual anatomy", he sold some pieces, and created his second solo exhibition, Lingua Sacra, shown at a former church hall in the Parnell Community Centre, Auckland in 2006. The work was noted for its darkness and theme of sexuality colliding with the spiritual.

Some art galleries and reviewers struggled with the sexual Christian content and complexity of a'Court's 2008 Do Not Fear solo show at the Wallace Gallery, Auckland. Others were more comfortable with the simpler, contemporary Christian mysticism found in his 2008 Beyond the religious image show, also at the Wallace Gallery. In this work a'Court sought to extend the "spiritual truths" he saw uncovered by McCahon.

A'Court's 2007 oil on canvas, Manu-Kahu, referring to the New Zealand harrier hawk which is connected to the divine by Māori, received praise for combining traditional European-style Christian imagery with Māori indigenous forms and McCahon-style speech bubbles.

In 2018, his first Northland solo show, Sheep, goats and other introduced spirits, at Whangārei's Hangar Gallery, a'Court continued his complex blending of Christian iconography with his life as a contemporary, rural Pākehā New Zealander, depicting the land, colonisation, introduced animals, human anatomy, and the tradition of vanitas.

A'Court was runner-up and winner of the Hugo Charitable Trust Award in Waikato Museum's 2021 National Contemporary Art Award, for Rua Kēnana and Pinepine Te Rika’s descent from Mt Maungapōhatu, which depicts the historical Māori prophet Rua Kēnana and his wife Pinepine Te Rika at the sacred mountain in Te Urewera.

In his 2022 solo show, Shadow of the Epiphany, also at the Hangar Gallery, a'Court continued to explore Christian mysticism and iconography, incorporating his research into the histories of Māori prophets from the Taranaki region's Ringatu and Ratana movements, and others. Many of the works were painted on stretched woollen blankets, which reference British colonisation's "disease, infestation, inequity, technology, trade, but also warmth and comfort".

A’Court’s 2024 solo exhibition Kings, Saints and Prophets – Kingi, Hunga, Tapu me nga Poropiti was made up of 11 woollen blanket portraits of historic Māori prophets and leaders, and explored their inner lives that were shaped by traditional and Christian principles, and their service to people through peace, love and reconciliation.

His 2025 solo show, Revelations and Regrets (Aotearoa New Zealand in the mid-19th century) featured people and stories from an era of significant change and conflict, which "saw the beginning of the New Zealand Wars, and the rise of Māori prophets and the spread of many political movements combining Christianity and Māori spirituality" as well as "excessive logging, forests being cleared for farming and the decline of native wildlife".

in his 2026 exhibition, Trouble in the Garden A'Court explored various spiritual entities and their capacity to either undermine or uphold Judeo-Christian ethics. The 13 oil on canvas and Indian rag paper paintings investigated objective morality and darkness masquerading as light.

== Personal life ==
A'Court has lived at his home studio in Waipu, with his wife Rachel, since they married in 1995. They have two children.

== Collections and awards ==
- The Whangārei Art Museum collection.
- The James Wallace Arts Trust collection.
- 2003 Whakatāne National Ceramics finalist.
- 2008 Wallace Art Awards finalist.
- 2021 National Contemporary Art Award, Waikato Museum, runner-up and winner of the Hugo Charitable Trust Award.
- 2022 National Contemporary Art Award, Waikato Museum, finalist.
- 2023 The Molly Morpeth Canaday Award, Arts Whakatāne and Whakatāne District Council, finalist.
- 2023 Craigs Aspiring Art Prize, Wanaka, finalist.
- 2023 WSA NZ Painting and Printmaking Awards, Waikato, finalist.
- 2023 National Contemporary Art Award, Waikato Museum, finalist.
- 2024 Craigs Aspiring Art Prize, Wanaka, merit award.
- 2024 Walker & Hall Waiheke Art Award, finalists exhibition.
- 2025 Craigs Aspiring Art Prize, Wanaka, finalist.
- 2025 WSA NZ Painting and Printmaking Awards, Waikato, finalist.
- 2025 National Contemporary Art Award, Waikato Museum, finalist.
- 2026 WSA NZ Painting and Printmaking Awards, Waikato, Main Prize in Paint winner.
- 2026 Molly Morpeth Canaday Award, Whakatāne, finalist.

== Exhibitions ==
- 2002 Lectio Divina, solo show, Letham Gallery, Ponsonby, Auckland.
- 2002–7 showing at Grantham Gallery, Auckland.
- 2006 Lingua Sacra solo show, Art-Artz, Parnell Community Centre, Auckland.
- 2008 Theology and Art group show, Salisbury House, Dunedin.
- 2008 Do Not Fear solo show, Wallace Gallery, Auckland.
- 2008 Behind the religious image solo show, Wallace Gallery, Auckland.
- 2009 Pathos solo show, Satellite Gallery, Auckland.
- 2009 Group show with Ewan McDougall, Thermostat Gallery, Palmerston North.
- 2010 Crucifixion group show, Hangar Gallery, Whangārei.
- 2010 Group show, Village Arts Gallery, Kohukohu, Hokianga.
- 2011 Credo and Quest group show, Whangārei Art Museum.
- 2013 Several Artists group show, Art-Artz.
- 2013 Fabrications group show, 3rd Space, Auckland.
- 2013 Visions of reality solo show, Museum of the Vernacular, Auckland.
- 2013 Grottos, Shrines and Sacred spaces solo show, Thermostat Gallery, Palmerston North.
- 2015 Exhibition of selected works from the collection, Whangārei Art Museum.
- 2015 House of Cards group show, The Incubator, Tauranga.
- 2015–16 Flesh and Spirit solo show, TSB Pah Homestead, Wallace Arts Trust, Auckland.
- 2017 Printing & Paint Atelier group show, Hangar Gallery, Whangārei.
- 2018 Sheep, goats and other introduced spirits, solo show, Hangar Gallery, Whangārei.
- 2020 Here & There group exhibition, Megan Dickinson Gallery, Whangārei.
- 2020 Mugshots group exhibition, Hangar Art and Framing, Whangārei.
- 2022 Huia group exhibition, Zimmerman Art Gallery, Palmerston North.
- 2022 Selected works, Boyd-Dunlop Gallery, Napier.
- 2022 Shadow of the Epiphany solo show, Hangar Gallery, Whangārei.
- 2022 Bones group exhibition, Zimmerman Art Gallery, Palmerston North.
- 2022 Redemption Songs small solo show, Scott Lawrie Gallery, Auckland.
- 2023 Rabbit group exhibition, Zimmerman Art Gallery, Palmerston North.
- 2023 Two Prophets, Two Angels small solo show, Scott Lawrie Gallery, Auckland.
- 2023 Selected works, Boyd-Dunlop Gallery, Napier.
- 2024 Deep group exhibition, Zimmerman Art Gallery, Palmerston North.
- 2024 UP group exhibition, Zimmerman Art Gallery, Palmerston North.
- 2024 Kings, Saints and Prophets – Kingi, Hunga Tapu me nga Poropiti solo show, Satellite2 Gallery, Auckland.
- 2025 Revelations and Regrets solo show, Zimmerman Art Gallery, Palmerston North.
- 2026 Carduelis Britannica solo show, Boyd-Dunlop Gallery, Napier.
- 2026 Trouble in the Garden solo show, Satellite2 Gallery, Auckland.

== See also ==
- List of New Zealand artists
