= Phill Cassey =

New Zealand ecologist

- Born: New Zealand
- Education: Auckland University; Griffith University
- Scientific career
- Fields: Invasion Ecology Environmental Crime Conservation Biology Biosecurity
- Workplaces: Adelaide University
- Website: www.wildlifecrimeresearchhub.org

Phillip Cassey is a New Zealand ecologist who specialises in conservation science and invasion biology. Cassey is an inaugural Australian Research Council Industry Laureate Fellow ('Combatting wildlife crime and preventing environmental harm') and was previously an inaugural Australian Research Council Future Fellow (2010–2014). He previously lead the Invasion Science & Wildlife Ecology Group at the University of Adelaide, and is currently Director of the Wildlife Crime Research Hub, at Adelaide University. He is a vocal advocate for diversity and inclusion.

== Early career and education ==
Cassey attended Glendowie College in Auckland, Aotearoa-New Zealand, and completed his Bachelor of Science and Masters at Auckland University. He was awarded his PhD in 2002 from Griffith University.

== Research and career ==
Cassey has co-authored over 400 scientific papers, book chapters and other research publications, and has been awarded eight Australian Research Council Discovery and Linkage Grants/Fellowships. He is a scientific communicator and has written about invasion biology and environmental biosecurity at The Conversation.

Cassey served as Head of the Ecology & Evolutionary Biology Department, University of Adelaide (2021–2023) and coordinated the University's Bachelor of Science Advanced program (2016–2022).
