= Glendowie College =

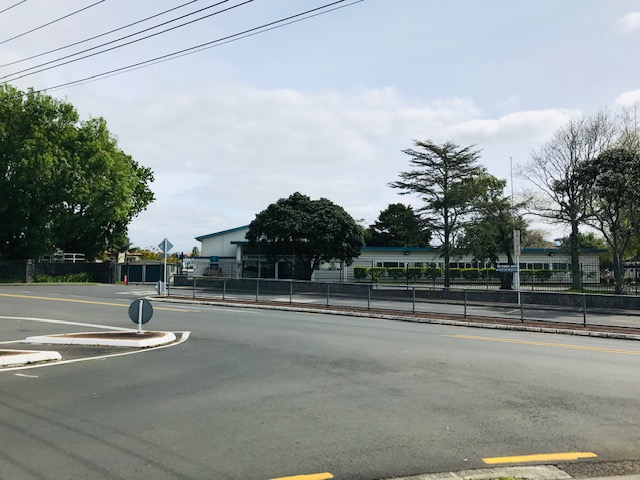

Location
- 21 Crossfield Road; Glendowie; Auckland 1071; New Zealand; 36.8621°S 174.8679°E

Information
- Type: Co-Ed Secondary (Year 9–13)
- Motto: E Paucis Excelsa (Literal: From few, height Non-literal: From few, greatness)
- Established: 1961
- Ministry of Education Institution no.: 65
- Principal: Gordon Robertson
- Enrolment: 1,195 (July 2026)
- Socio-economic decile: 10Z
- Website: http://www.gdc.school.nz/

Glendowie College is a public secondary school in Auckland, New Zealand.

== History ==
The college was opened in 1961, with fewer than 200 pupils. The technology block, now Adams Building, was the only building established at the time of the school's opening.

Like most New Zealand state secondary schools built in the 1960s, Glendowie College was built to the Nelson Two-Storey standard plan, with its two-storey H-shaped general classroom blocks.

In 2020 and 2021 the school completed its state-of-the-art Science Block. The Science block was Co-Built with the Summerville School for Special Needs. As well as recently completing a learning centre for its own students.

== Enrolment ==
As of July 2026, Glendowie College has a roll of 1,195 students, of which 73 (6.1%) identify as Māori.

As of 2026, the school has an Equity Index of 392, placing it amongst schools whose students have the fewest socioeconomic barriers to achievement (roughly equivalent to deciles 9 and 10 under the former socio-economic decile system).

== Education ==
Glendowie College offers the National Certificate of Educational Achievement as its national qualification standard. Also, exceptionally gifted students are given the opportunity to accelerate into classes a year or two years ahead of their peers in order to progress their learning.

For students Year 9-10 English, Mathematics, Science, Social Studies, P.E and Health are compulsory with students being able to choose from 4 options outside of these subjects. Those options are Art, Drama, Dance, Music, Chinese, German, Maori and Spanish. English is compulsory up until Year 12 and Math is only compulsory till year 11, besides these subjects students from year 11 onwards are allowed to choose six subjects (including English) in year 12 and five subjects in year 13.

In 2020 the Board decided to remove NCEA Level 1 for year 11 students, instead opting to form their own curriculum in line with the IB standard. This continues onto the NCEA Framework. This Course follows on from IB standard taught in Years 9 and 10.

The Education Review Office has said that students are progressing and achieving very well.

== Sport ==
Glendowie College offers a range of sporting opportunities. Glendowie College also participates in the top level of School Rowing in New Zealand. It takes part in the annual Rowing Secondary School Championship, The Maadi Cup. Placing 1st in the Boys U18 lightweight coxed 4+ and the Girls U16 Coxed 8+, 2nd in the Boys U15 coxed 8+ and 3rd in the Boys U15 8+x in the 2015 Maadi Cup. During the 2017 season, the Boys U15 8+x received another bronze medal.

== Notable alumni ==
- Brett a'Court – artist
- Ginny Blackmore – musician
- Phill Cassey – ecologist
- Marina Erakovic – professional tennis player
- Noah Hickey – Gisborne City soccer player
- Kevin Iro – New Zealand national rugby league representative
- Tony Iro – New Zealand national rugby league representative
- Dane Sorensen – New Zealand national rugby league representative
- Kurt Sorensen – New Zealand national rugby league representative
- Sarah Thomson – actor
- Judith Tizard – former politician
- "Mad" Mike Whiddett – drift driver and ambassador for motorsport in New Zealand

== Houses ==
Glendowie has four pastoral houses to encourage student participation in the arts, sports, culture and leadership. Between 1961 and 2017 the four houses consisted of Asia, Europe, America and Pacific, named after four continents. At the conclusion of 2017, four new houses were created, taking their names from famous Māori myths and legends. The four houses became Rūaumoko (God of Volcanoes), Tāne Mahuta (Lord of the Forest), Tangaroa (God of the Sea) and Tāwhirimātea (God of Weather), with the house colours of Red, Green, Blue and Purple respectively. Upon joining Glendowie College future students are assigned one of the four houses randomly. If the student has a sibling at the college, past or present, they will likely be assigned that house for ease of communication between pastoral staff and parents.

== 50th Jubilee ==
On 1, 2 and 3 April 2011, Glendowie College held many events to celebrate the 50th anniversary of the school's founding.
