= Brent Wong =

New Zealand painter (born 1945)

- Born: 1945 (age 80–81); Ōtaki, New Zealand
- Known for: Painting, music composition
- Movement: Surrealism

Brent Wong (born 1945) is a New Zealand surrealist painter and music composer.

== Early life ==
Wong was born in 1945 in Ōtaki, New Zealand. His family moved to Wellington in 1949, where he has subsequently lived. As a child, he had difficulty reading, which led him towards drawing as an alternative means of self-expression. He briefly studied at Wellington Polytechnic's School of Design in 1963 before dropping out, and in 1965 began working for the Dominion newspaper.

== Art career ==
Wong claims artistic influence from Turner, Kandinsky, Klee, and Andrew Wyeth. He is famous for his surrealist land, sea, and cloudscapes along with entirely abstract works.

Wong first exhibited his paintings in 1967 at the New Zealand Academy of Fine Arts and his first solo exhibition was in 1969 at the Rothmans Gallery in Wellington, where he presented 12 paintings. The solo exhibition "excited extravagant critical attention: and overnight established the previously unknown Brent Wong as an important painter in the local context."

He quit painting in 2008 to pursue musical composition. In 2026, there was an exhibition of his paintings at Toi Mahara.

== See also ==
- New Zealand art
- List of New Zealand artists
