= Eden Bleazard =

New Zealand visual artist

- Born: Eden Emma Bleazard; 1 March 1855; Auckland, New Zealand
- Died: 13 May 1946 (aged 91)
- Education: Pupil of Alfred Sharpe
- Known for: Painting
- Notable work: Tara Tara Mountain, Whangaroa Harbor
- Awards: Three from Auckland Society of Arts between 1881 and 1897, including design prize (1887)

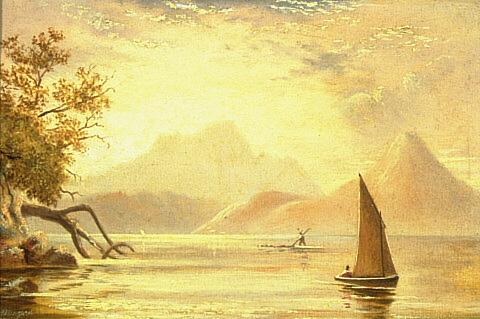
Tara Tara Mountain, Whangaroa Harbor

Eden Emma Bleazard (1 March 1855 – 13 May 1946) was a visual artist from New Zealand. She won three awards from the Auckland Society of Arts in 1887.

== Early life ==
Bleazard was born in Auckland, New Zealand and was the daughter of Robert Bleazard, a merchant. Her sister Clara Bleazard was also an artist, and growing up they made several trips to Europe together. Bleazard and her sister were pupils of Alfred Sharpe, whose influence can be seen in her early paintings.

== Career ==
A large watercolor made by Bleazard in 1873 of her family house in Mount Eden provided an early indication of her talent as an artist. She exhibited with the Auckland Society of Arts between 1881 and 1897 and won three first awards from the society, including a prize for design in 1887. Her works include Tara Tara Mountain, Whangaroa Harbor (1884).
