= James Robert Ford =

British artist (born 1980)

James R. Ford
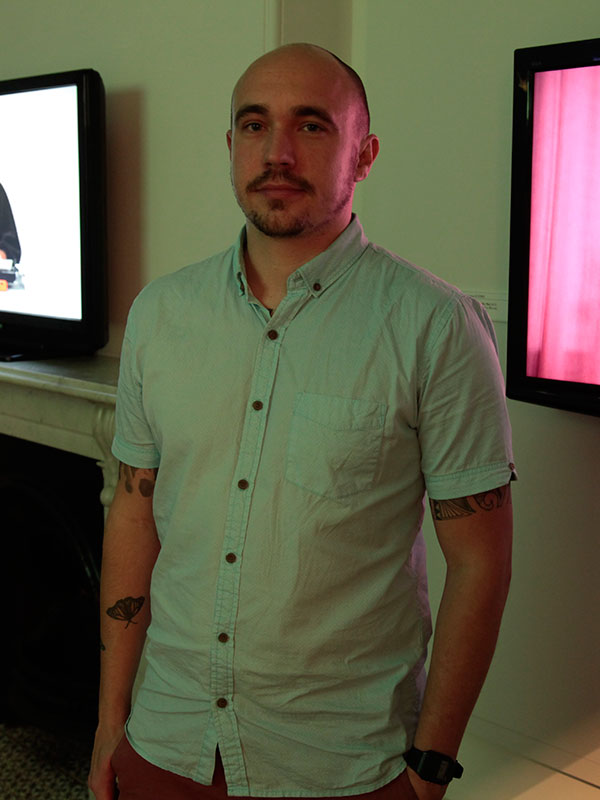
- Born: 6 May 1980; Frimley, England
- Education: Nottingham Trent University, Goldsmiths
- Known for: Conceptual art, neo-conceptual art, installation art
- Notable work: House Gymnastics, General Carbuncle

James Robert Ford is a contemporary British conceptual artist.

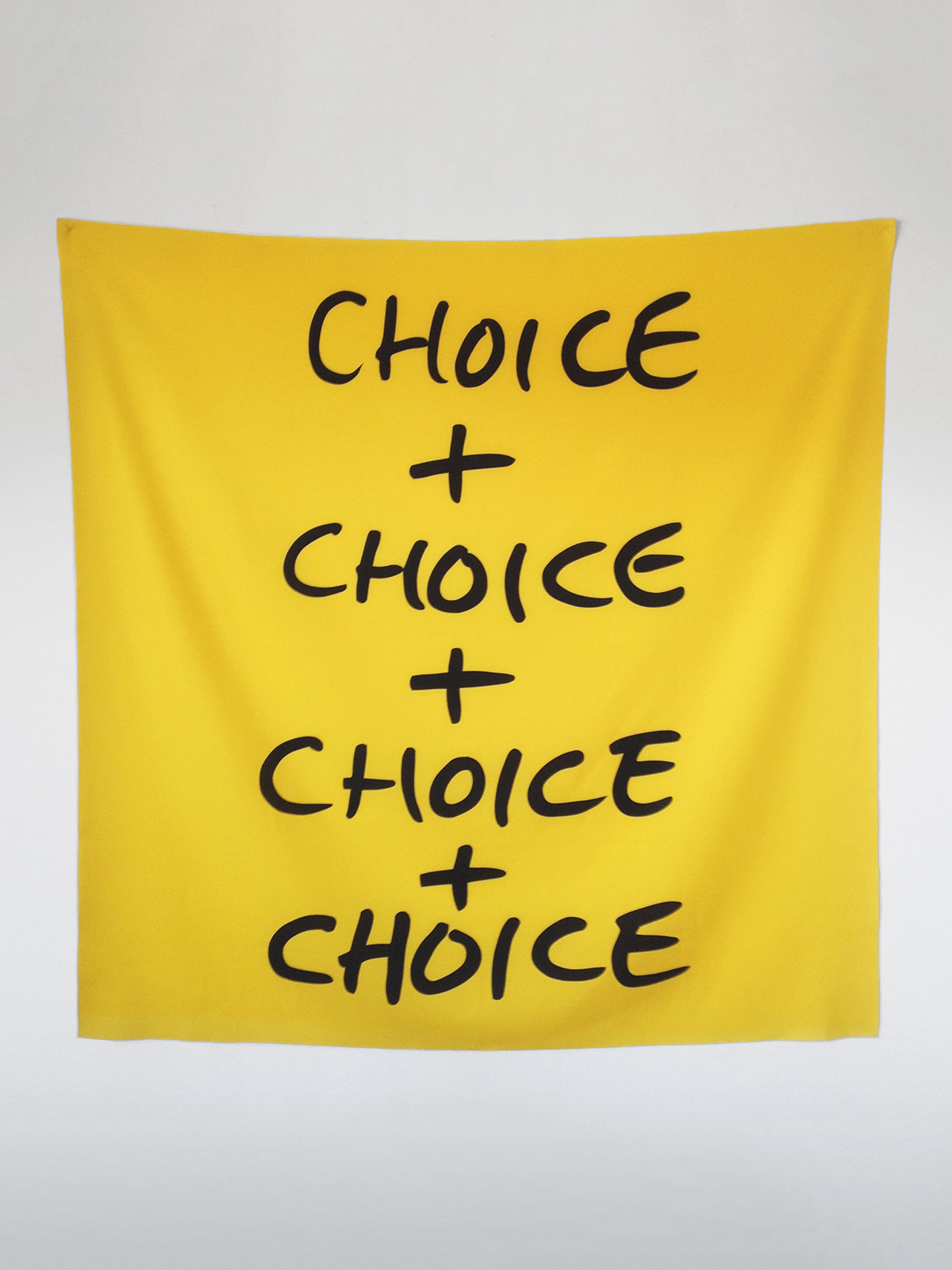
Ford's Sum of Choices, 2016, dye sublimated satin, 120 cm × 120 cm (47 in × 47 in)

== Work ==
Ford works with looped short films, found object assemblage, text statements and minimalist mark making.

Curator Rudi Christian Ferreira said in 2007 of Ford's work:

The playfulness of Ford’s work allows him to approach complex philosophical theories and present the audience with an entry point from which to explore existential concerns. There is an urgency in his work yet the folly with which he articulates these urgencies is refreshing. As we try to navigate a way through the milieu of our contemporary condition we feel that Ford, through his practice, might be able to suggest to us a different way of seeing and/or being.

Ford studied at Nottingham Trent University and Goldsmiths, University of London and currently lives and works in Wellington, New Zealand. Ford has exhibited widely throughout the United Kingdom, New Zealand and internationally, and in 2013 was winner of the inaugural Tui McLauchlan Emerging Artist's Award from the New Zealand Academy of Fine Arts. In 2012 Ford curated a national touring exhibition of contemporary male artists based in New Zealand, entitled Never Mind the Pollocks, featuring creatives including Bill Culbert.
