= Tui McLauchlan =

New Zealand artist (1915–2004)

- Born: 1915
- Died: 2004 (aged 88–89)
- Known for: Painting (watercolour), needlepoint
- Awards: Governor-General's Art Award (1996) Porirua City Civic Award (2001)

Tui McLauchlan (1915–2004) was a New Zealand artist. She helped establish the Kapiti Arts and Crafts Society and is a fellow of the New Zealand Academy of Fine Arts.

== Career ==
McLauchlan began painting in her 40s and her works were impressionist in style, often working in watercolour. She exhibited with the New Zealand Academy of Fine Arts and with The Group in 1934.

McLauchlan helped establish the Kāpiti Arts and Crafts Society in 1973 and the Paraparaumu & Mana Arts Society (now Mana Arts Society) in 1982.

In 1996 she received the Governor-General's Art Award (becoming a fellow and lifetime member of the New Zealand Academy of Fine Arts) and in 2001 a Porirua City Civic Award.

She is the author of A Brush With Tui (2003).

=== Tui McLauchlan Emerging Artist's Award ===
Following her death, the Tui McLauchlan Art Award Trust established the Tui McLauchlan Emerging Artist Award with the aim of furthering the reach and impact of emerging artists. Winners have included James Robert Ford in 2013 and Yona Lee in 2014.

== Personal life ==
McLauchlan grew up in Auckland and worked as a journalist. After marrying she moved to Wellington. In 1990 she moved to Pukerua Bay and lived there until her death in 2004. McLauchlan had three daughters.
