= John Calcott St Quentin =

New Zealand artist (1818–1869)

John Calcott St Quentin (fl. 1863–1869) was a notable New Zealand painter, designer and workers' advocate. A supporter of William Sefton Moorhouse, he unsuccessfully stood for various elections in Christchurch, seeking membership on the Canterbury Provincial Council and Christchurch City Council. Despite failing to get elected for office, his 1868 design, involving native birds and plants, for the Christchurch borough seal was approved.
