= Frederick Daniel Cornwell =

New Zealand painter and trade unionist

Frederick Daniel Cornwell (30 September 1875 – 5 December 1948) was a New Zealand painter and trade unionist. He was born in Hamilton, Lanarkshire, Scotland on 30 September 1875.
