= William Griffin (painter) =

New Zealand painter, labour reformer and gold miner (1811–1870)

William Griffin (c.1811 – 13 July 1870) was a New Zealand painter, glazier, labour reformer and gold miner. He was born c. 1811.
