= Mary Wirepa =

New Zealand artist (1904–1971)

Mary Wi Repa
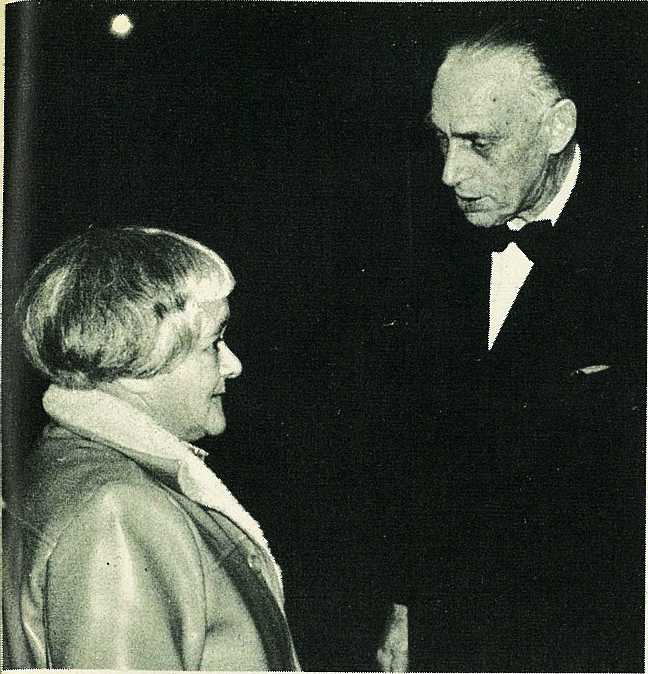
- Born: Mary Gundry; 1904; Auckland, New Zealand
- Died: 1971 (aged 66–67); Auckland
- Resting place: Opotiki
- Known for: Painting
- Notable work: Otoko, Gisborne
- Movement: Realism, Romanticism, Modernism
- Spouse: Romio Wi Repa

Mary Wirepa (1904–1971; Ngāti Apa), also known as Mary Wi Repa, was a painter born in Auckland, New Zealand.

== Career ==
Growing up, Mary Wirepa had a love of music but pursued painting later in life, when she was in her fifties. In 1956, at the age of 52, Wirepa submitted a painting to an art competition at the A & P Show in Ōpōtiki and emerged as the winner. She continued to paint from 1956 until her death in 1971. Wirepa went on to enter the Kelliher Art Exhibition several times and held multiple exhibitions around New Zealand. She developed a love of landscape painting, particularly romanticism combined with interpretive realism. By the time she died, Wirepa was considered a leading Māori landscape artist.

Wirepa's family had a history of artists, and she believed her talent particularly came from her great-uncle Arthur Gundry who attended the Royal Academy of London between 1866-68 and had been mentored by Joseph Jenner Merrett. In her earlier life, Wirepa had planned to attend the Elam School of Fine Arts at the University of Auckland and applied for a tuition grant from Māori Affairs. However she ultimately decided against attending.

Her works often include cloud imagery or landscapes, including the piece Otoko, Gisborne (date unknown). Wirepa exhibited at the Willeston Galleries (Wellington) in 1964, and her pieces are included in the Museum of New Zealand Te Papa Tongarewa. She also received painting assignments from Britain, Canada and the United States. One American collector commissioned 100 paintings from Wirepa.

== Personal life ==
Wirepa's whakapapa traces connections to Ōpotiki in the Bay of Plenty through her father and to Matakōwhai Bay and Kāwhia through her mother. Wirepa's mother, Alice Wade, was involved in the Kingitanga movement, and Alice signed the 1893 petition to extend the authorisation to New Zealand women.

Wirepa married Romio Wirepa at the age of nineteen and had nine children while living in Whanarua Bay, the subject of many of her paintings. Four of her children were artists, namely firstborn Edward Wirepa, Arthur Wirepa, Kathleen Neenee, Rosemary Connell, Alice Bernadette Higgins, as well as her grandson Ivan Wirepa, who was known as a classical pianist in the Māori music industry/community.
