= Tony Kuepfer =

American born New Zealand glass artist (born 1947)

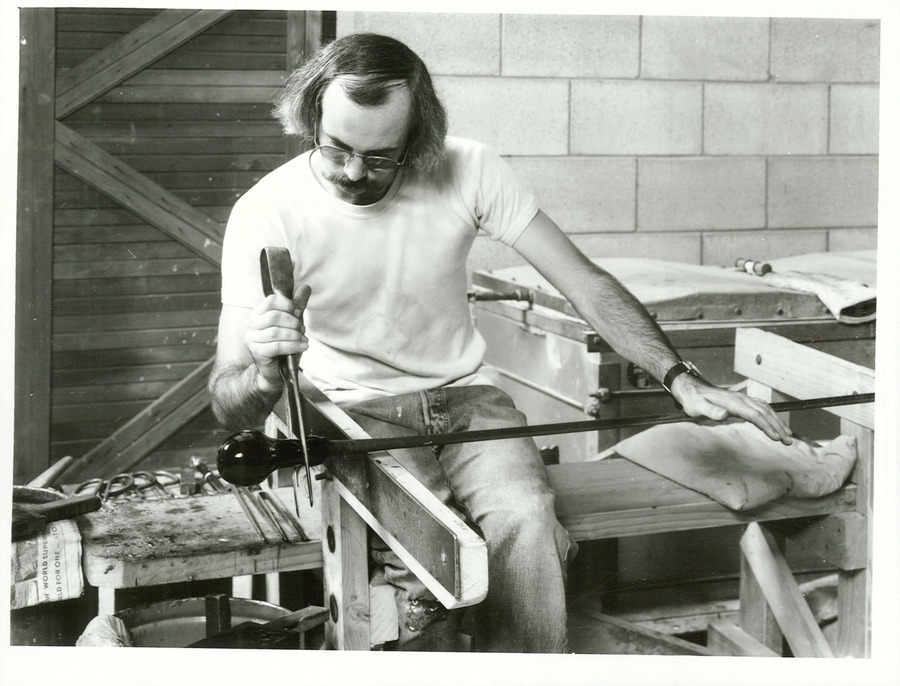
- Born: 1947 (age 78–79); Portland, USA
- Known for: glass blowing

Tony Kuepfer (born 1947 in Portland, Oregon) is an American-New Zealand glass artist.

He studied at Portland State University before moving to Inglewood, in Taranaki, New Zealand in 1974. Here, Kuepfer and his wife converted an old church into a studio, glass furnaces and a showroom. According to Stuart Park, Kuepfer ‘continued at Inglewood for nearly 15 years, and provided many New Zealanders with their first chance to buy studio glass and to see it being made’. He has exhibited with the New Zealand Academy of Fine Arts. In 1981 he was profiled on the New Zealand television arts programme Kaleidoscope.

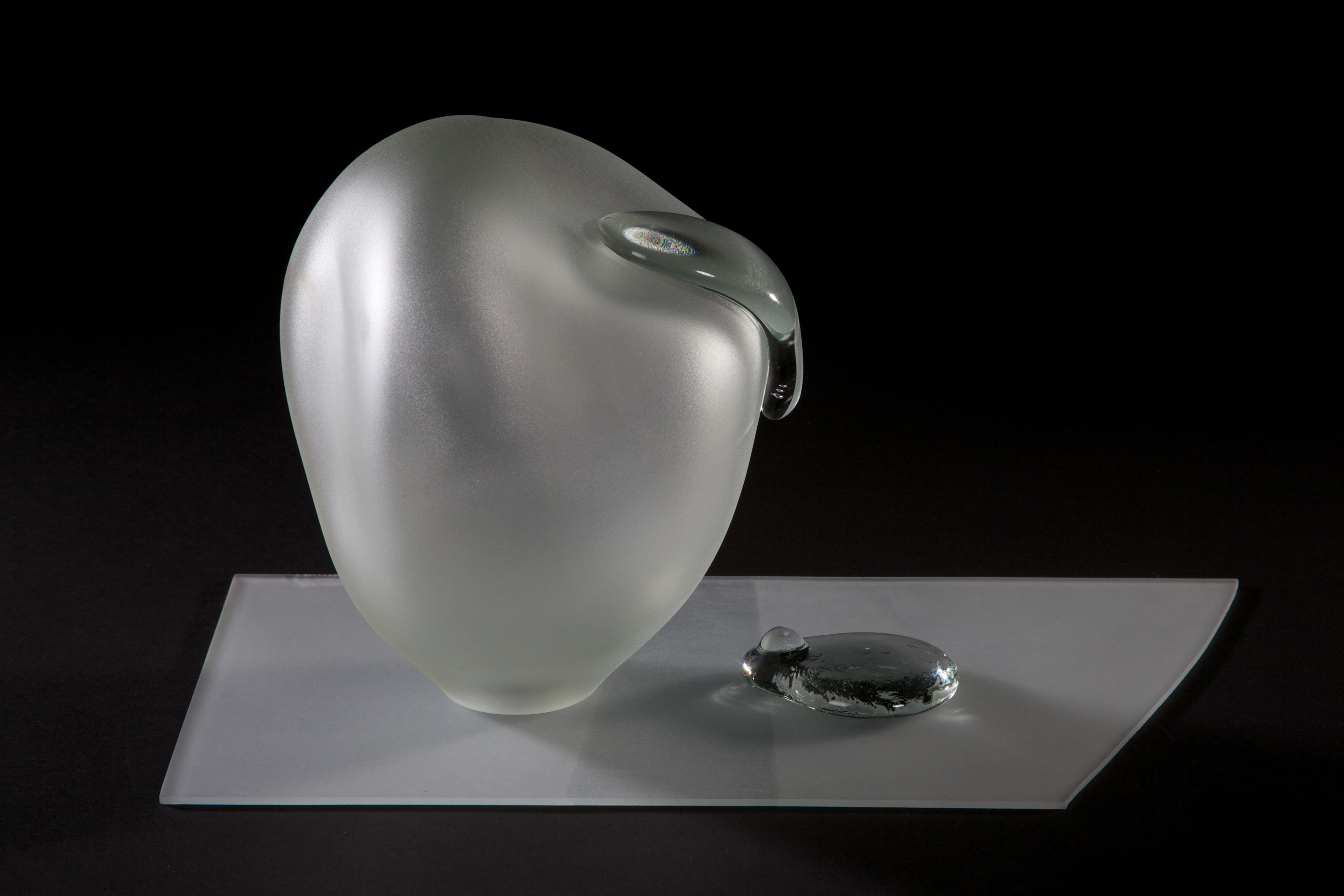
Form by Tony Kuepfer

His work is held in the collections of many of the national and regional museums in New Zealand. These include the Museum of New Zealand Te Papa Tongarewa, the Auckland War Memorial Museum, the Dowse Art Museum, the Christchurch Art Gallery, and the Aigantighe Art Gallery in Timaru.
