= Gertrude Ball =

New Zealand artist (1879–1971)

Gertrude Ball (1879–1971) was a New Zealand artist and wood-engraver. Her work is held in the permanent collections of Christchurch Art Gallery and Auckland Art Gallery.

== Biography ==
Ball was born and raised in Auckland, where her father Thomas was also a painter. In 1920 moved to London to further her art education. She exhibited with the Royal Academy of Arts in London between 1926 and 1940, and became a member of the Society of Graphic Art and the Society of Women Artists. In 1931, Ball returned to New Zealand to look after her elderly mother, and returned to London in July 1932. During this time she exhibited at the New Zealand Academy of Fine Arts.

In 1936, she began to prepare a publication to be titled British Castles: A Book of Woodcuts, creating thirty woodcuts, and designing and setting the title page and text. The book was ultimately not published.

Ball returned to New Zealand after World War II. In 1948 she and her friend, artist Mabel Still, travelled through Central Otago making woodcuts, including of locations in Arrowtown and Alexandra. She continued to live and paint in Auckland for the remainder of her life.
