= Violet Whiteman =

English-born New Zealand artist

Violet Emily Whiteman (née Sells; 24 December 1873 – 21 January 1952) was an English-born New Zealand artist. Her work is in the permanent collection of the Sarjeant Gallery in Whanganui, New Zealand. Her paintings depict farm animals and pets, including foxes, dogs and horses.

Whiteman was born in Guildford, Surrey, England, in 1873. She studied art at Herkomer School in Bushey; she also studied anatomy at the London Veterinary College and took lessons from animal painters William Frank Calderon and Stanhope Forbes.

In 1926 she moved to New Zealand and settled near Whanganui and lived on a farm. She exhibited with the Wanganui Arts Society. She also accepted private commissions to paint clients' pets and prized animals, such as the racehorse Beau Le Havre.

Whiteman died in Whanganui on 21 January 1952, and her body was buried in Aramoho Cemetery.
