= Frances Dolina Ellis =

New Zealand artist (1900–1971)

- Born: 1900
- Died: 1971
- Occupations: Painter, teacher, printmaker

Frances Dolina Ellis (25 February 1900 – 1971) was an artist, printmaker and teacher who lived, worked and exhibited in both Australia and New Zealand. Ellis was well-known in the arts community in New Zealand and whilst living in Australia she had a significant professional relationship with artist and art teacher Antonio Dattilo-Rubbo.

== Biography ==
Ellis was born in Taihape, New Zealand. Her parents were William Agate Ellis, farmer and Mary Fraser McDonald. Ellis showed early artistic promise at the Diocesan School, Marton and Wanganui Art and Technical School, and she travelled to London where she trained at the Central School of Arts and Craft in the mid-1920s. While there, she was greatly influenced by Bernard Meninsky.

In 1934 she moved to Sydney, Australia to study under Antonio Dattilo-Rubbo, whose focus was on French post-impressionism, including the cubist work of Cézanne. In 1936 she was exhibiting with the Australian Art Society in Sydney and she received praise for her "very pleasant watercolour Flowers and Fruit". In 1938 Ellis exhibited at the newly opened Castlereagh Fine Art Gallery in Rowe Street with artist Dora Toovey. The exhibition focused on Sydney coastal and river paintings with Ellis exhibited two watercolours Evening at Narrabeen and The Boat Builder.

Ellis assumed the administration of the Dattilo-Rubbo School between 1941 and 1949. At the time the school was considered to rival the major art school in Sydney run by Julian Ashton. Dattilo-Rubbo had migrated from Italy to Australian in 1897 and not long after set up his school in Manly, NSW. In his teaching Dattilo-Rubbo demonstrated the skills used by artists such as Cézanne, Gauguin and Vincent van Gogh. Three of his best-known students, Roland Wakelin, Grace Cossington Smith and Roy De Maistre reflect his influence. Dattilo-Rubbo used conventional techniques in his own painting and encouraged his students in developing their oil painting skills. Ellis herself was strongly influenced by cubism, while her subject matter was chosen from her local environment. As a result she was considered to be a "regionalist painter".

After Dattilo-Rubbo's wife died, Ellis who had been a pupil, teacher and friend, took over the organisation of his school, and in later years, his house. In 1942 Ellis painted an oil portrait of Dattilo-Rubbo, who was fond of Ellis and painted her portrait in 1947. Both portraits show the artists painting. He gave his painting to Ellis, whose niece Yolanda Hutton donated it to the Sarjeant Gallery in 1977 after Ellis died. Ellis's portrait of Datillo-Rubbo is one of her best-known works. It was a finalist in the 1942 Archibald Prize run by the Art Gallery of NSW. Datillo-Rubbo said that the work displayed "strong drawing, virile colour and excellent touch" and he specifically asked the painting be donated to the Sarjeant Gallery, where the paintings hang side by side.

Ellis based herself in Sydney but travelled frequently to Europe and New Zealand. She often exhibited her works in Hamilton, New Zealand and was a close friend of Ida Carey and other artists in Waikato.

In 1954, Ellis exhibited with the Water Colour Institute at the David Jones Gallery in Sydney. Ellis and other members of the Institute were identified by the art critic for the Sydney Morning Herald "as having nearly lost the flavour of the 'great tradition' of naturalism as practised by our forefathers and having found Cezanne". The exhibition was notably opened by Eugene Goossens.

Later in the year, Ellis's work Clay Pit was selected for the Mosman Art Prize with the Sydney Morning Herald's art critic finding the overall standard of the work in the exhibition as "gay and adventurous" and a further comment that suggested Ellis's painting showed "promise".

In 1987, Ellis was somewhat "rediscovered" in New Zealand when the Waikato Museum held a retrospective exhibition of her work.

Ellis's work is held in the collections in New Zealand at the Auckland Art Gallery Toi o Tāmaki, Museum of New Zealand Te Papa Tongarewa and the Waikato Museum has a large number of watercolours.
