= Tania Patterson =

New Zealand jeweller (born 1969)

- Born: 1969 (age 56–57)
- Occupation: Jeweller

Tania Patterson (b 1969) is a New Zealand jeweller. She graduated from Auckland's UNITEC Institute of Technology in 1989 with a Diploma in Craft and Design.

Since graduating, Patterson has worked as a self-employed jeweler. Her work is often made of moving parts which she says, 'explores the complexities of recreating a simple event in nature'.

In 2000 her work was included in Risk, an exhibition curated by Kelly Thompson at The Suter Art Gallery in Nelson. In 2002/3 Tania received funding from Creative New Zealand to develop a new series of kinetic jewellery.

Patterson's work, Flowers in the Sky was exhibited in the 2015 Headland Sculpture on the Gulf which takes place on Waiheke Island. She has exhibited widely throughout New Zealand including The Dowse Art Museum and the major applied arts and crafts galleries of New Zealand such as Quoil, Fingers (gallery), Masterworks, Royal Jewellery, and Form Gallery.

== Further sources ==
- The Dowse Art Museum; Kobi Bosshard, The Second New Zealand Jewellery Biennial: Same But Different, 1996.
- Deborah Crowe; The Dowse Art Museum, 4th New Zealand Jewellery Biennale: Grammar: Subjects and Objects, 2001.
