= Katie Gold =

New Zealand potter

Katie Gold is a New Zealand potter based in Nelson. Her work is mostly handbuilt, constructed from layered and joined slabs, and with highly textured surfaces formed from stamps, rollers and cutting tools. Gold won awards for her work in 1996 and 1997.

== Education ==
Gold is originally from Wairarapa. Gold lives in the Upper Moutere region near Nelson in New Zealand. She completed a certificate in handwoven textiles from Nelson Polytechnic, followed by a Certificate and Diploma in Craft Design. She was Graduate Resident in pottery at the Nelson Polytechnic and also taught pottery at the Nelson Community Potters.

Gold's work is mainly handbuilt, focusing on slab-constructed domestic ware with highly textured surfaces. She layers and joins slabs, texturing with stamps, rolling pins and lino-cutting tools. Gold makes her own pottery glazes. Her colours and shapes are inspired by marine environments, incorporating shells, boats, lighthouses and crustaceans. Her range of handbag, boot and shoe-inspired works was featured at Form Gallery in the Christchurch Art Gallery in 2005.

Gold's work has featured in the 1991 and 1994 Fletcher Challenge shows and the New Zealand Society of Potters' Royal Easter Show. She won the Premier Award at the 1996 Cleveland Charitable Foundation Trust show in Dunedin, and in 1997 won the first prize at both the Cleveland and the Birkenhead Award exhibitions.

Gold has been part of more than 100 national and international exhibitions. In 2023 Gold held a joint exhibition with painter Catherine Garrett at The Artist's Room in Dunedin, showing works inspired by native flora and fauna and using transfer images, and "sumptuous bowl forms".

== Personal life ==
Gold is married to potter Owen Bartlett.
