= Edith Emily Morris =

New Zealand jewelry designer and silversmith (1895–1965)

- Born: Edith Emily Hopson; 6 December 1895; Hougham, United Kingdom
- Died: 28 December 1965 (aged 70); Wellington, New Zealand
- Known for: Jewellery design, Silversmith
- Spouse: Leonard Kenneth Morris (m. 1918)

Edith Emily Morris (6 December 1895 – 28 December 1965) was a New Zealand jewellery designer and silversmith. She was born in Hougham, Kent, England on 6 December 1895.
