= Helen Calder =

New Zealand painter

Helen Calder (born 1955) is a New Zealand artist. Her work is part of the permanent collection of Te Papa (the national museum of New Zealand), the Auckland Art Gallery and the Christchurch Art Gallery.

== Biography ==
Calder was born in Christchurch and studied at the University of Canterbury, graduating with a master's degree in fine arts in 2003. Her art is held in private and public collections including the Chartwell Collection, the Fletcher Trust Collection and Simpson Grierson Collection. She has also taught art and was the head of the visual art department at Rangi Ruru Girls' School in Christchurch.

Calder's artworks are three-dimensional pieces, often created by pouring paint onto a panel and allowing it to dry before shaping. Her artwork explores abstraction, both its history and experimentation to its limits, while her process focuses on colour and form to create her pieces.
