= Yuk King Tan =

New Zealand artist

- Born: 1971 (age 54–55); Townsville
- Education: Elam School of Fine Arts
- Alma mater: University of Auckland

Yuk King Tan (Chinese: 陳玉瓊, born 1971 Townsville) is an Australian-born New Zealand artist. Her work is held in the permanent collections of Auckland Art Gallery Toi o Tāmaki and the Museum of New Zealand Te Papa Tongarewa.

Tan was born in Australia in 1971 and grew up in New Zealand. She graduated from Auckland's Elam School of Fine Arts in 1993. Tan works with video as well as creating installations from commonly found objects. Her key works from the 1990s include The New Temple—I give so that you may give, I give so that you may go and stay away (1995), a wall installation of over 100 objects that dipped in red wax; Untitled (Red Masks) (1998), which consists of 11 masks—inexpensive, mass-produced items Tan purchased from Asian supermarkets—wrapped in red threads, with the colour red referencing her Chinese heritage and stories of migration and resettlement in New Zealand.

Her work has been included in the exhibitions 'Remember New Zealand', 26 Bienial de Sao Paulo, Sao Paulo; 'Centre of Attraction', the 8th Baltic Triennial, Lithuania; 'Telecom Prospect 2001: New Art New Zealand', City Gallery Wellington; 'Flight Patterns', Museum of Contemporary Art, Los Angeles; and 'Toi Toi Toi', Auckland Art Gallery, Auckland and Museum Fridericianum, Kassel. She has held artists residencies at the Ludwig Forum für Internationale Kunst in Aachen; Artspace Sydney; and Camden Arts Centre, London.

In 2005, Tan moved from Auckland to Hong Kong; later the same year she presented her first solo installation in Wellington at City Gallery. Tan has explored the themes of protests and agency in works such as ‘Loudspeaker’ (2005), a series of photographs made in collaboration with photographer Neil Pardington, which depicts the artist standing in different locations while holding a loudspeaker right in front of her face. In the wall installation Crisis of the Ordinary (2019), Tan gathered objects left behind from the recent demonstrations in Hong Kong, New Zealand, Korea, and elsewhere, and wrapped them in brightly coloured strings reminiscent of national flags.
