= Harriet Greenwood =

New Zealand artist

- Born: Harriet Amelia Sampson; 1869; Australia
- Died: 9 September 1948 (aged 78–79)
- Resting place: Purewa Cemetery, Auckland

Harriet Amelia Greenwood (née Sampson, 1869 – 9 September 1948) was a botanical illustrator based in New Zealand.

== Biography ==
Harriet Amelia Greenwood was born Harriet Amelia Sampson in 1869 in Lockwood, Australia. She married Rev. Arthur John Greenwood in 1897 in Wagga Wagga. They moved around parishes within Australia and New Zealand. In New Zealand, Rev. Greenwood was a vicar at St. Luke's Church in Mt. Albert, Holy Trinity in Devonport and at St. Albans, Balmoral.

She exhibited in the Auckland Society of Arts. Her depiction of Kōwhai at the 1918 exhibition was described by the critic as:

"Yellow Kowhai," by Mrs. H. A. Greenwood, occupies a prominent position. Kowhai is not easy to paint. It does not mass well, and yet its blooms are small for individual treatment. Mrs. Greenwood has made a plucky attempt and given good painstaking work.

Her illustration of a spray of jacaranda also drew mention in the 1920 exhibition write up. Nine of her illustrations are now in the Auckland War Memorial Museum.

She died on 9 September 1948, aged 79, and was buried in Purewa Cemetery.

== Botanical Illustrations ==
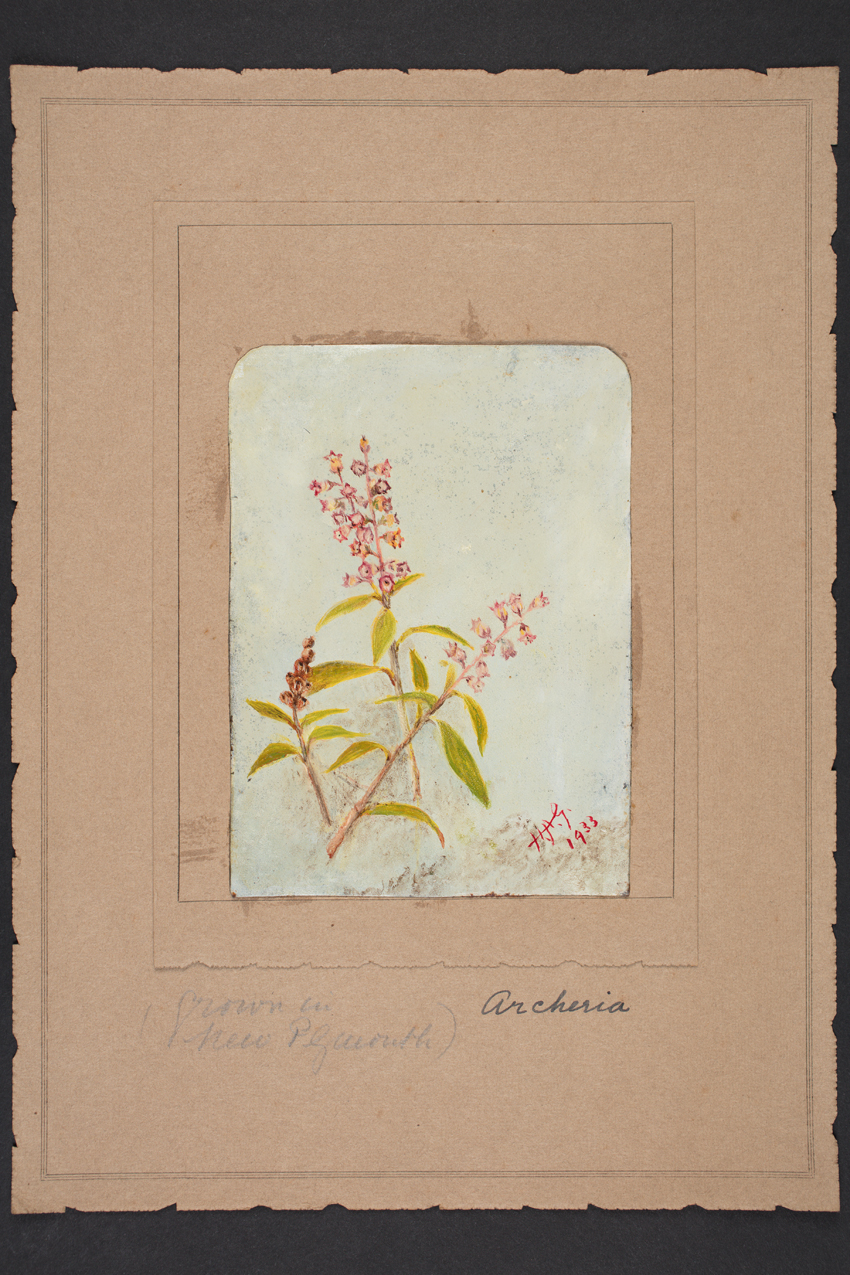
Archeria by Harriet Amelia Greenwood

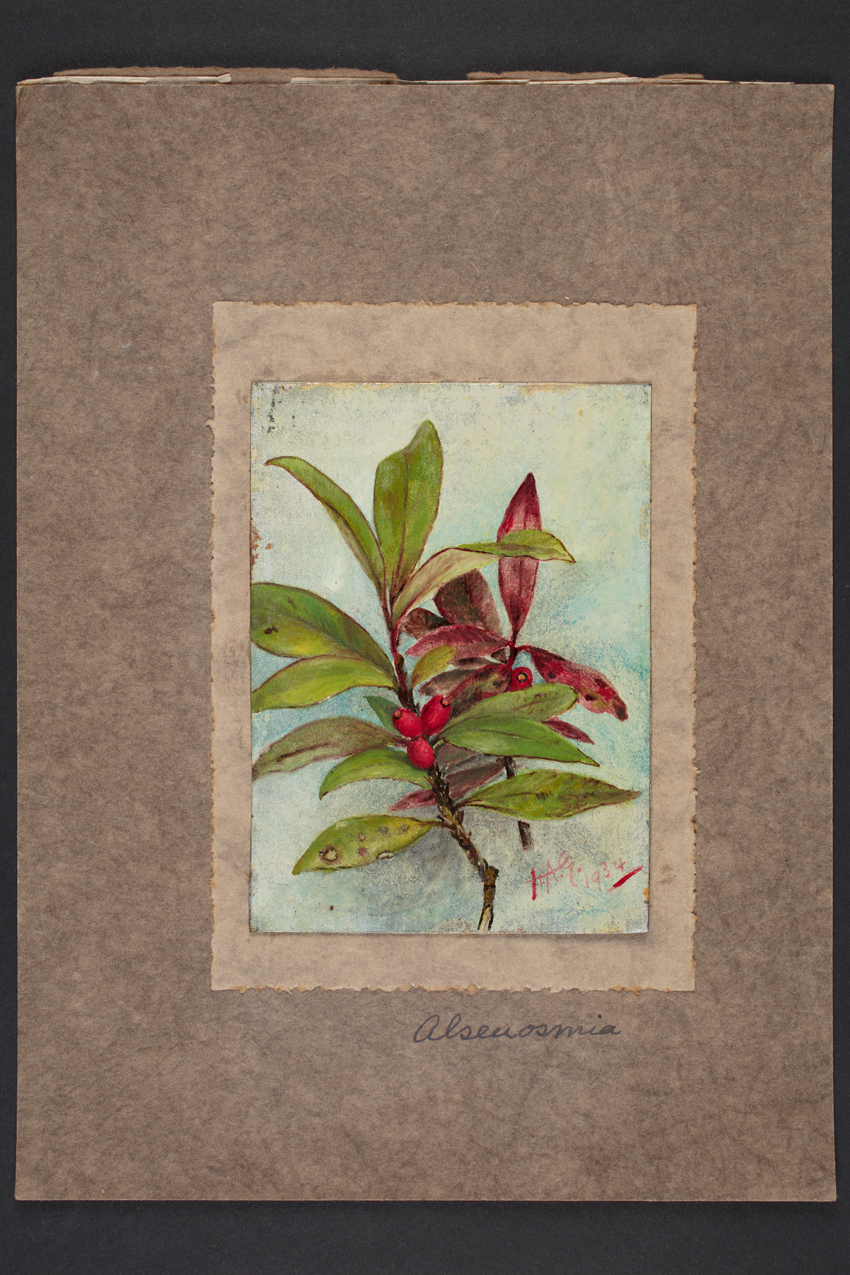
Alseuosmia by Harriet Amelia Greenwood

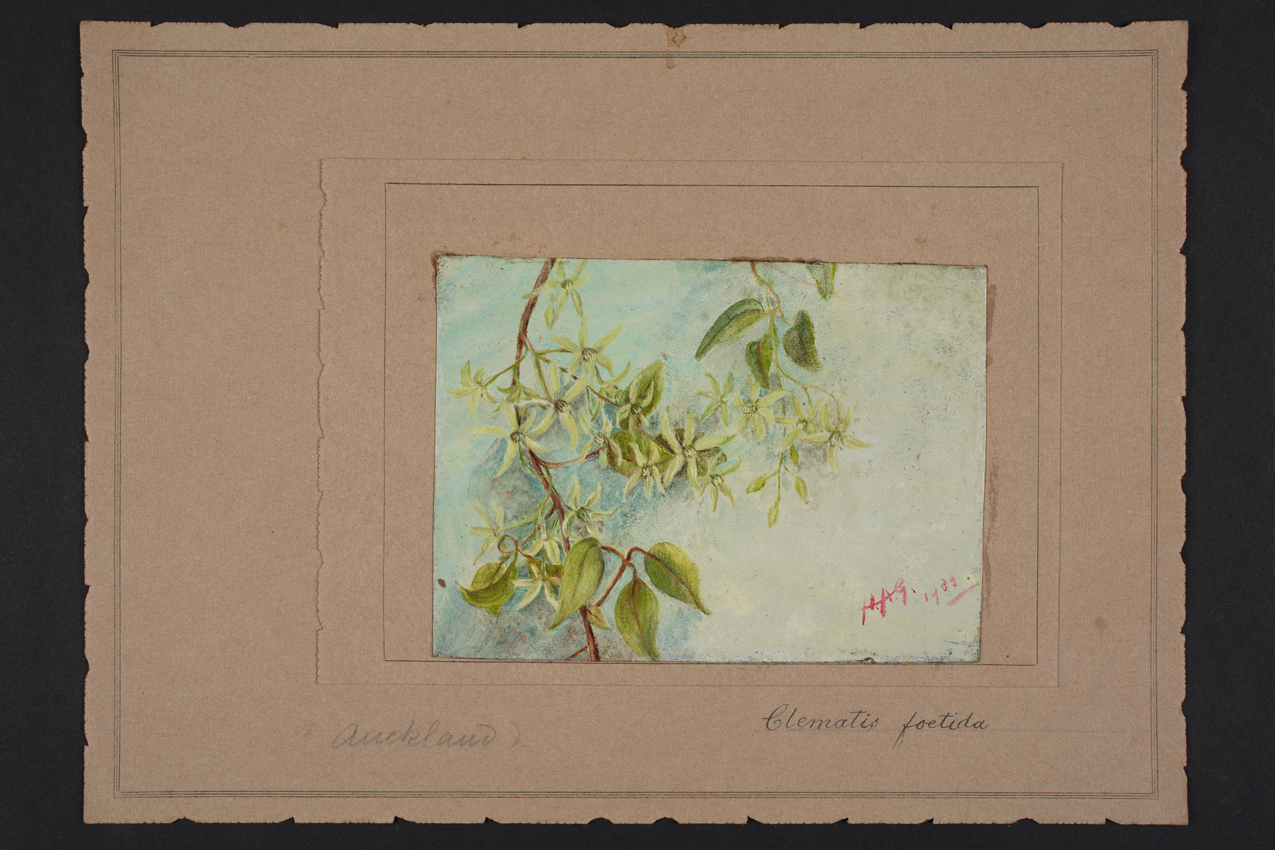
Clematis foetida by Harriet Amelia Greenwood

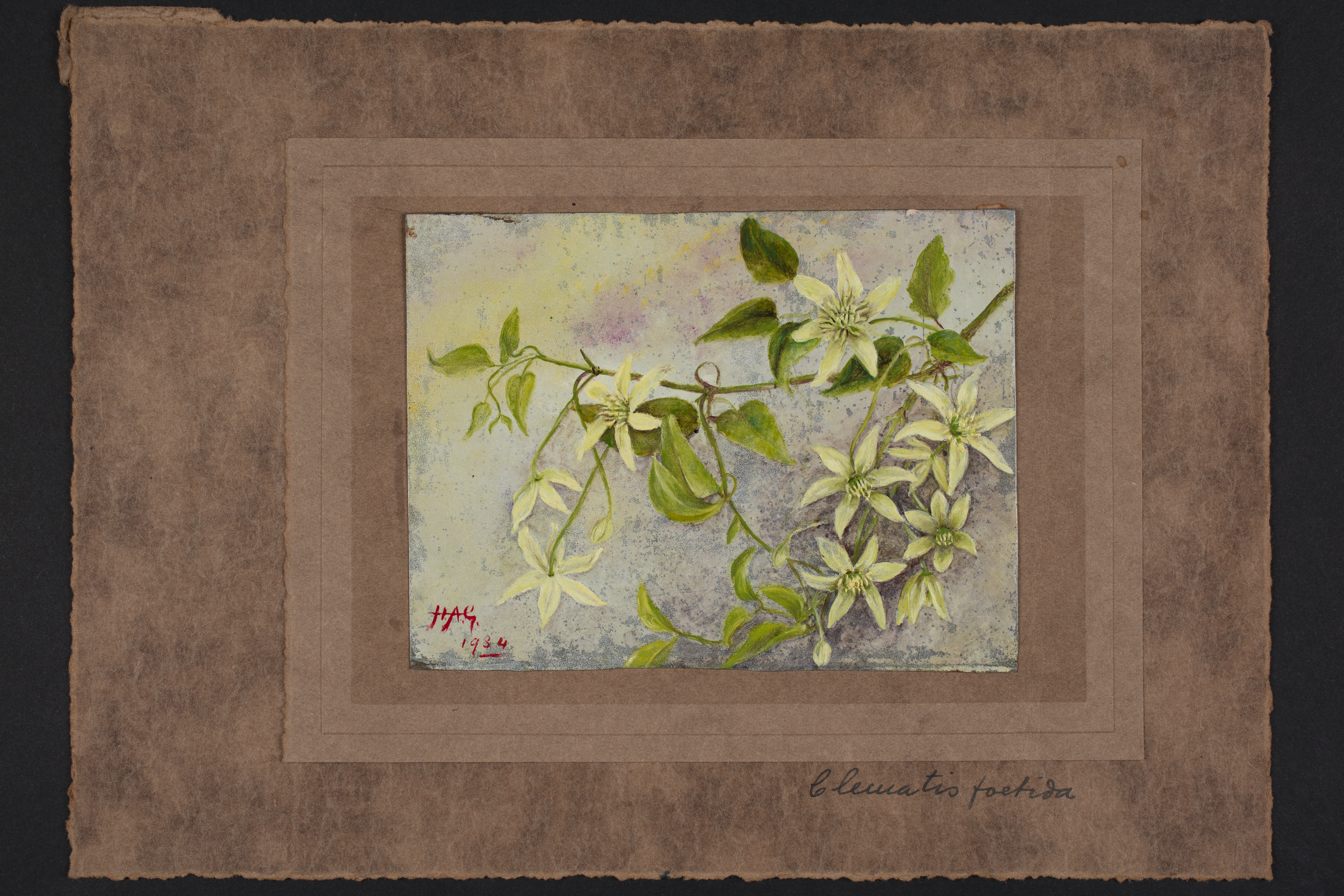
Clematis foetida by Harriet Amelia Greenwood

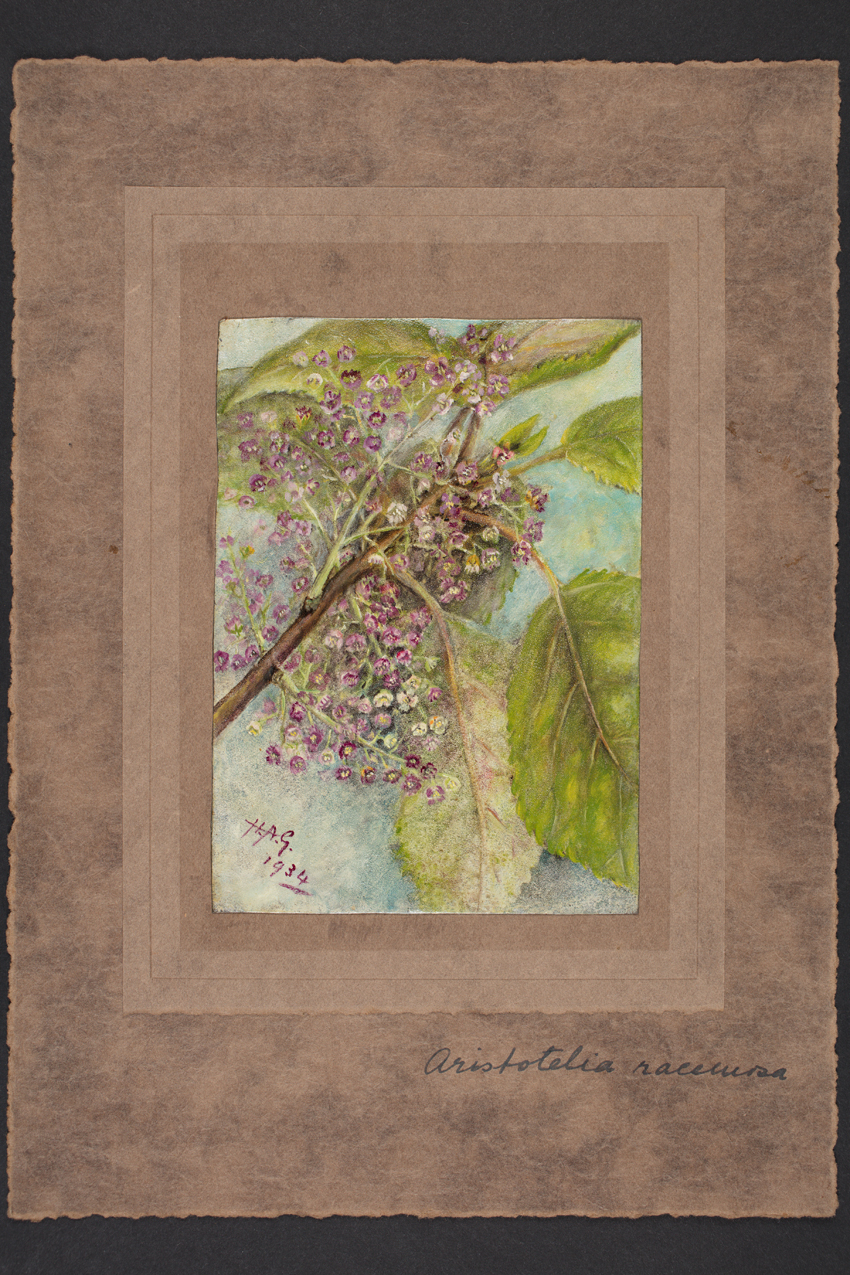
Aristotelia racemosa by Harriet Amelia Greenwood

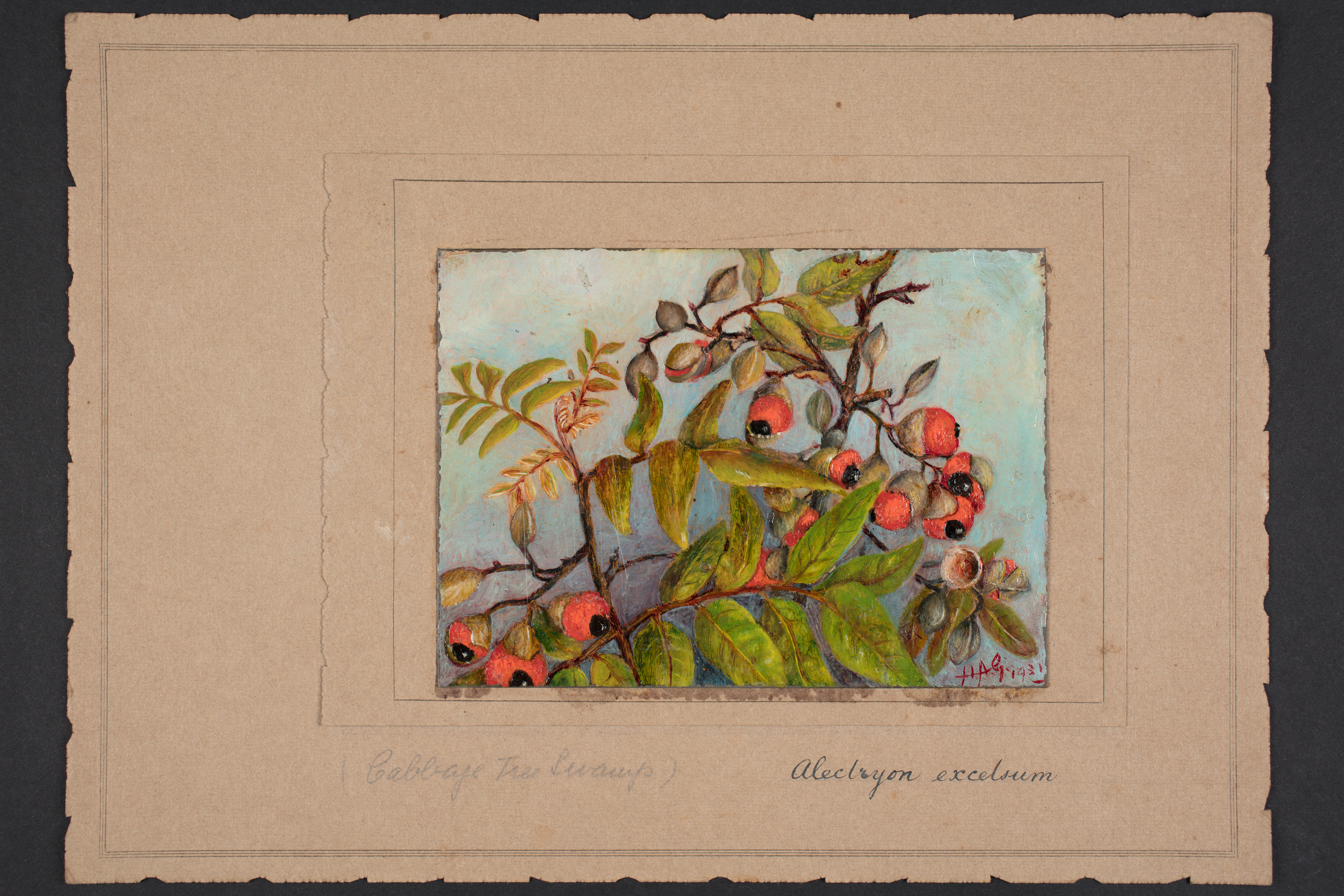
Alectryon excelsum by Harriet Amelia Greenwood

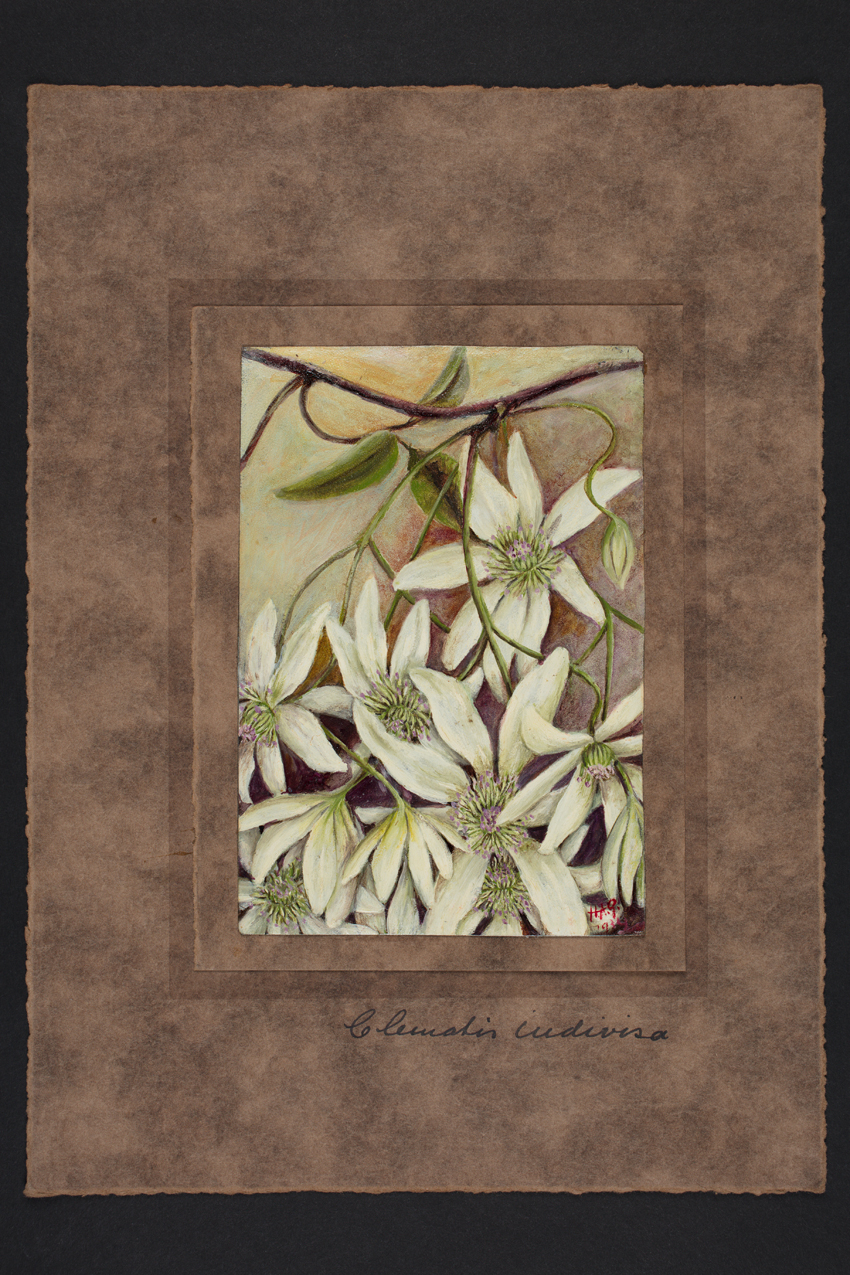
Clematis indivisa by Harriet Amelia Greenwood

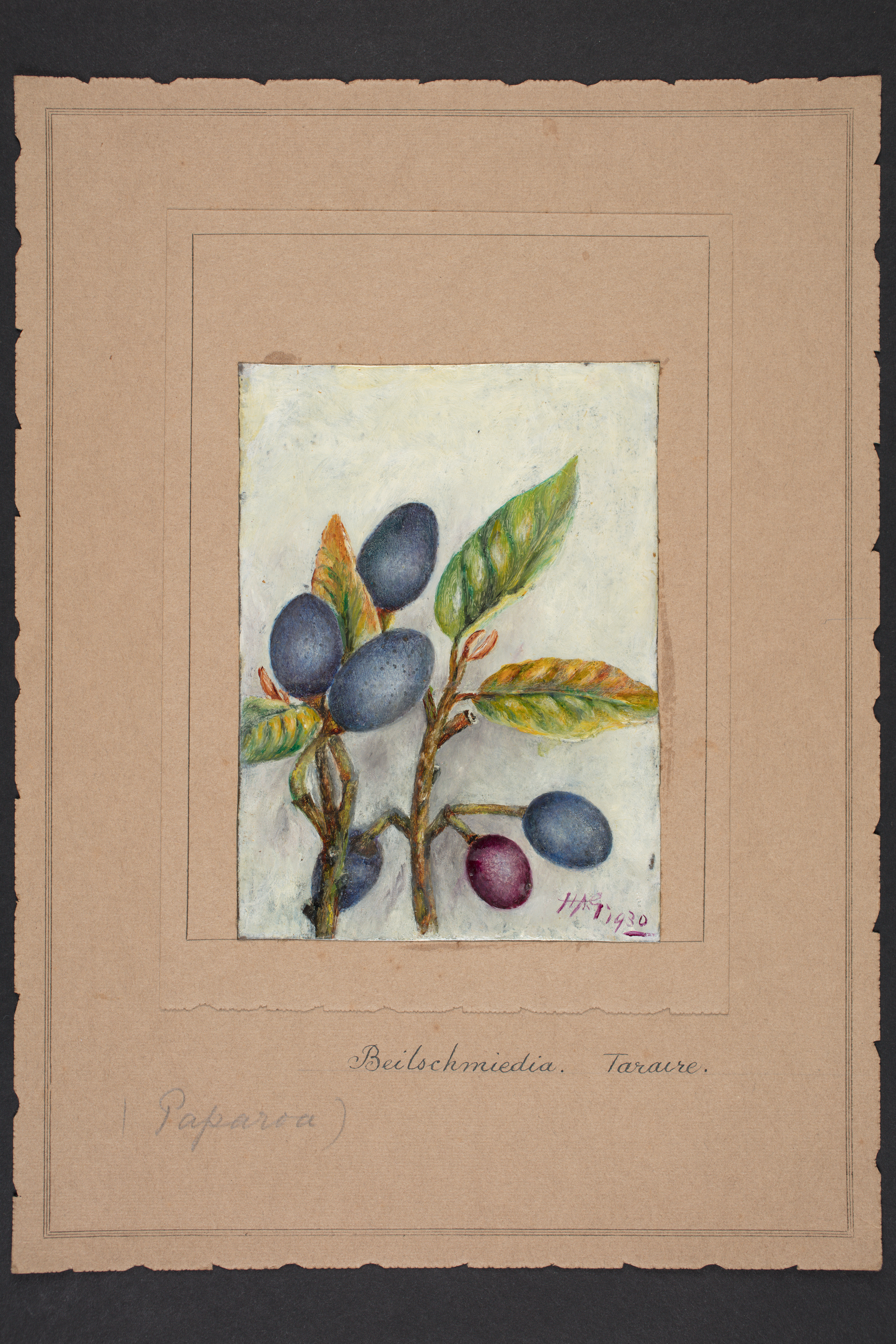
Beilschmiedia taraire by Harriet Amelia Greenwood

== See also ==
- Botanical illustration
