= Selina Foote =

New Zealand artist

- Born: 1985 (age 40–41); Auckland, New Zealand
- Education: Elam School of Fine Arts, University of Auckland
- Known for: Painting
- Notable work: Vilain (2013), Devereux (2011)
- Style: Abstract

Selina Foote (born 1985) is a visual artist from New Zealand. Pieces by Foote are included in the collections of the Chartwell Trust and Museum of New Zealand Te Papa Tongarewa.

== Education ==
Foote graduated with a Master of Fine Arts from Elam School of Fine Arts, University of Auckland, in 2011. She received her Bachelor of Fine Arts in 2008, also from Elam.

== Career ==
While her paintings are abstract in style, Foote often draws inspiration from historic paintings. This has included referencing nineteenth century women Impressionist painters such Berthe Morisot and Mary Cassett. Her series in the exhibition Ray (2014) took their starting point from the portrait paintings by Manet and Rembrandt and the Pink Morning exhibition references Eva Gonzalès's 1874 work La Matinee Rose. Foote's paintings are often small scale, using silks and canvas and her works include Vilain (2013) and Devereux (2011).

Between 2014 and 2015 Foote lived in London, traveling throughout Europe to research the work of late–19th century and early–20th century women artists. She currently lives and works in Auckland, New Zealand.

=== Exhibitions ===
Foote is represented by the Two Rooms gallery and they have hosted several of her exhibitions including The Pink Morning in 2017, Ray in 2014, and alongside Jeena Shin and Jan van der Ploeg in the 2015–2016 exhibition Over Under Sideways Down.

Foote was selected to be included in the 2011 Prospect: New Zealand Art Now exhibition, showcasing contemporary art and New Zealand artists. She has also exhibited with the Sue Crockford Gallery (Auckland, New Zealand), the Hamish McKay Gallery (Wellington, New Zealand), and was part of the Window Project Space at the University of Auckland.
