= Rachael McKenna =

New Zealand photographer

Rachael McKenna (born 1971) is a photographer from New Zealand, described by the Bay of Plenty Times as "one of the world's best-known animal photographers". She has published at least 19 books of photographs, primarily of animals and children, which have sold millions of copies. Her work has also featured on greeting cards and calendars.

McKenna has been taking photographs since the age of eight and says she has always wanted to be a photographer. She graduated from Auckland University with a diploma of arts, majoring in photography and printmaking. Her first job was as an assistant to photographer Anne Geddes for three years. She has worked around the world, has lived in France, New York City, and currently resides in Central Otago.

McKenna originally worked under the name Rachael Hale, and built a brand under that name, but sold the Rachel Hale brand in 2007. She then worked as Rachael Hale McKenna, then as Rachael McKenna.

She is married and has a daughter.
