= Ann Culy =

New Zealand jeweller (born 1952)

- Born: Ann Culy; 1952; Lower Hutt, New Zealand
- Education: Ilam School of Fine Arts, Diploma (Fine Arts) 1973
- Known for: Jewellery

Ann Culy (born 1952) is a New Zealand jeweller. She has exhibited widely and her work is held in several New Zealand public collections.

== Early life ==
Culy was born in 1952 in Lower Hutt. In 1973 she graduated from Ilam School of Fine Arts with a Diploma in Fine Arts.

== Jewellery career ==
After returning to tertiary study in 1990, gaining a Certificate in Craft Design at Otago Polytechnic, Culy became a full-time jeweller. She began working at Fluxus Contemporary Jewellery in Dunedin in 1991 and became a partner in the business the following year. In 1995, she established her own jewellery business, Lure Jewellery Workshop, which contained a shared workspace, gallery and retail outlet. Her work has been included in three New Zealand Jewellery Biennials; Open Heart: Contemporary New Zealand Jewellery, organized and toured by The Dowse Art Museum in November 1993, The Second New Zealand Jewellery Biennial: Same But Different in 1996, and the 4th New Zealand Jewellery Biennale: Grammar: Subjects and Objects, in 2001.

== Working process ==
In an interview with Susan Cummins for the Art Jewellery Forum, Ann Culy discussed her working process when creating pieces of jewellery, saying, “I do use ancient techniques in my making, they still hold fast. I mix and pour my own ingots. The rings have no solder; they are constructed simply by forging, fusing, filing, burnishing, and stamping. I like that they can easily be returned to the metal they came from with the melt of a flame.”

== Collections ==
Her work is held in the collections of Museum of New Zealand Te Papa Tongarewa and the Christchurch Art Gallery.

== Further sources ==
- The Dowse Art Museum; Eléna Gee, 'Open Heart: Contemporary New Zealand Jewellery', November 1993.
- The Dowse Art Museum; Kobi Bosshard, The Second New Zealand Jewellery Biennial: Same But Different, 1996.
- Deborah Crowe; The Dowse Art Museum, 4th New Zealand Jewellery Biennale: Grammar: Subjects and Objects, 2001.
