= Alice Whyte =

New Zealand artist (1885–1952)

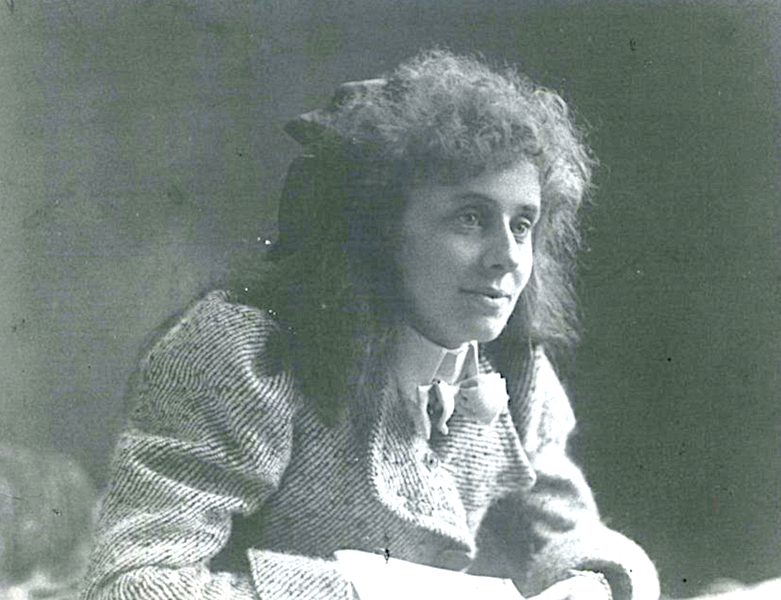
- Born: Alice Fanny Fallwell; 14 September 1877; New Zealand
- Died: 3 July 1952 (aged 74); New Zealand
- Education: Elam School of Fine Arts
- Known for: Landscape watercolours
- Spouse: Norman Alexander Whyte (m. 1908)

Alice Fanny Whyte (née Fallwell, 14 September 1877 – 3 July 1952) was a New Zealand artist. She exhibited under the names Alice Fallwell, Alice Whyte, and Alice F. Whyte.

Born Alice Fanny Fallwell on 14 September 1877, Whyte was the daughter of Samuel Fallwell, a dispensing chemist, and Martha Ann Fallwell (née Wilkinson). The family lived in Papakura, South Auckland, and Whyte studied art at the Elam School of Fine Arts, travelling by train from Papakura every day. She was a teacher at Elam from 1905 until 1908, when she married Norman Alexander Whyte on 17 March of that year at St Andrew's Church, Epsom. From 1929 she studied at Elam again, and became well known as a watercolour artist. In 1928 she exhibited at the Society of Women Painters in Sydney.

In July 1930, Whyte was the first member of the Auckland Society of Arts to hold a solo exhibition in Auckland. In 1936, one of her paintings was awarded the Judkins landscape medal by the Auckland Society of Arts. In 1940, Whyte's paintings were included in the New Zealand Centennial Exhibition in Wellington, and the following year one of her works was awarded the Bledisloe Medal for most typical New Zealand natural landscape.

Whyte died on 3 July 1952, and she was buried at Māngere Lawn Cemetery.

Whyte's work is held in public collections in New Zealand, including the Dunedin Public Art Gallery.
