= Gwyneth Richardson =

New Zealand artist (1896–1980)

Gwyneth Marian Richardson (1896–1980) was a New Zealand watercolour artist. Her work is included in the collection of Auckland Art Gallery.

== Biography ==
Richardson studied art at the Central School of Art and Design and Heatherley School of Fine Art, both in London. She worked in book and calendar illustration, and produced watercolour landscapes and portraits in England and New Zealand.

Richardson exhibited with the New Zealand Academy of Fine Arts, Wellington between 1921 and 1973, the Canterbury Society of Arts between 1936 and 1941 and in the British Empire Exhibition in London in 1924.
