= Kate Ogston =

New Zealand artist (1852–1916)

- Born: Kate Ridings; 21 August 1852
- Died: 27 September 1916 (aged 64)
- Resting place: Anderson Bay Cemetery

Kate Mary Ogston (née Ridings; 21 August 1852 – 27 September 1916) was an artist in Dunedin, New Zealand. She was known for floral and landscape paintings.

== Biography ==
Kate Mary Ogston (née Ridings) was born on 21 August 1852 at Pyrmont, New South Wales, as the daughter of George Ridings and Catherine Williamson. They moved to New Zealand in the mid-1850s. On 7 December 1887 at Bishop’s Court, Auckland, she married Dr Frank Ogston, a University of Otago lecturer, and together they had a daughter.

She exhibited in New Zealand and Australia:

- Auckland Society of Arts 1881-1887
- Otago Art Society 1888-1915
- Canterbury Society of Arts 1889-1912
- New Zealand Academy of Fine Arts 1898-1899
- New Zealand Industrial Exhibition, Wellington 1885
- New Zealand and South Seas Exhibition, Dunedin 1889
- Centennial Exhibition, Melbourne, 1888-1889

Ogston won second place at the New Zealand Industrial Exhibition, Wellington, 1885, and third place at the New Zealand and South Seas Exhibition, Dunedin, 1889-1890. She signed the New Zealand women's suffrage petition. She was also engaged in golfing and was the first elected President of the Dunedin Ladies Golf Club, which first met at her home on 22 June 1892.

She died on 27 September 1916 and is buried in Andersons Bay Cemetery.

== Collections ==
Ogston's work is held in the permanent collection of the Dunedin Public Art Gallery, and the Hocken Collection, University of Otago.
