= Kenneth Hassall =

New Zealand artist (1902–1970)

- Born: Kenneth Welsh Hassall; 1902; England
- Died: 1970 (aged 67–68)
- Occupation(s): Artist, architect

Kenneth Welsh Hassall (1902 – 1970) was a New Zealand artist and printmaker.

Hassall was born in England and immigrated to New Zealand with his mother at a young age. He studied design at Wellington Technical College and went on to work as an architect and drafter. Hassall became known as a linocut artist during the 1940s, and was considered one of New Zealand's most talented linocut artists at the time.
