= Jane Brenkley =

New Zealand artist, craftsperson and farmer (1882–1973)

- Born: 7 March 1882; Norsewood, Hawke's Bay, New Zealand
- Died: 25 February 1973 (aged 90)
- Known for: Wood carving, Needlework, Painting

Hannah Eliza Jane Brenkley (née Hopkins, 7 March 1882 – 25 February 1973) was a New Zealand artist and craftswoman. She created artworks through carving, needlework, and painting. Her work is in the permanent collections of the National Library of New Zealand, the Museum of New Zealand Te Papa Tongarewa, and the Museum Theatre Gallery Hawke's Bay.

== Biography ==
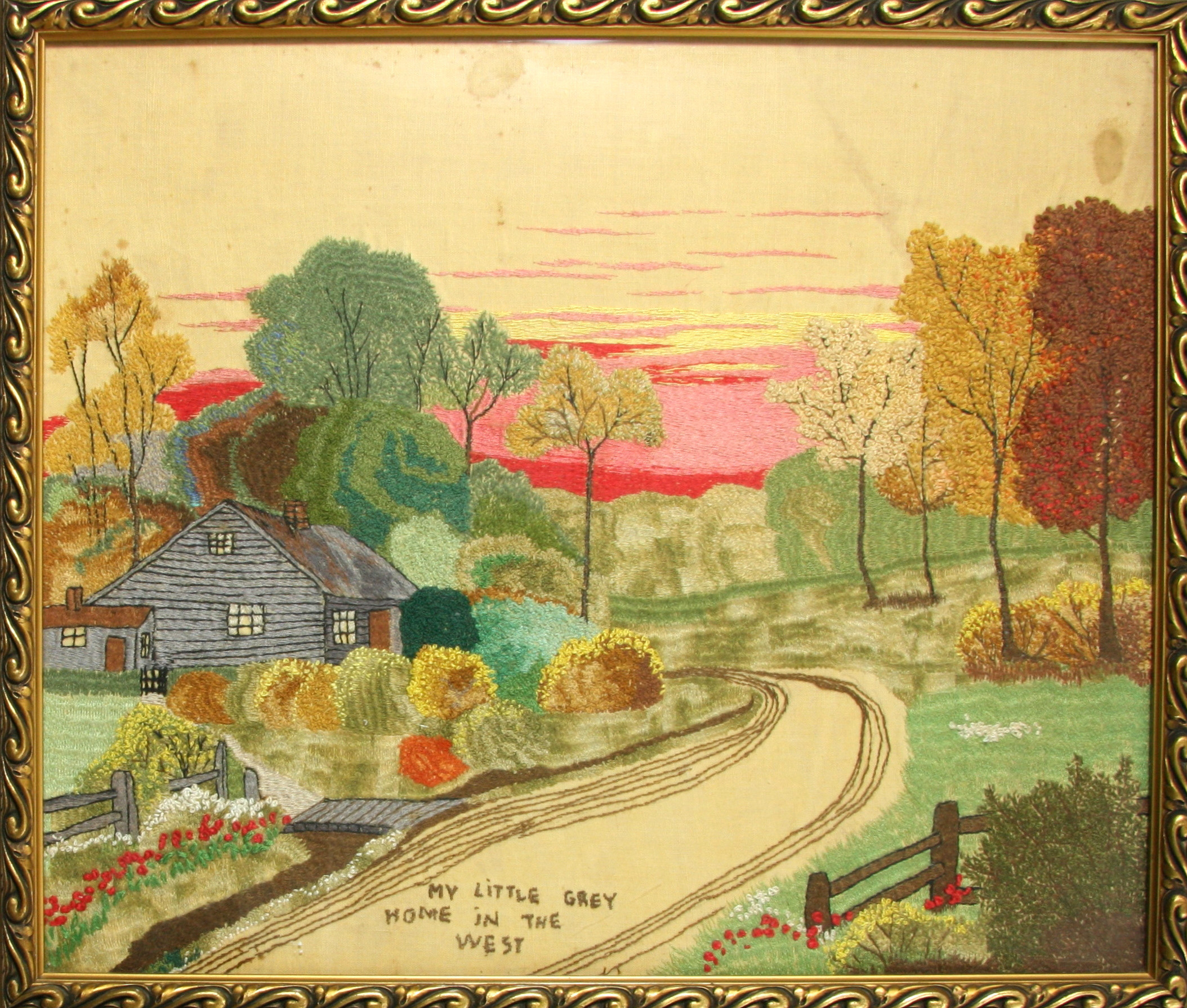
'My Little Grey Home in the West', circa 1950, New Zealand, by Jane Brenkley. Te Papa

Brenkley was born in Norsewood, Hawke's Bay, New Zealand. Her parents were Scandinavian and had immigrated on board the Hovding. When she was five years old, she started sketching; a family member gave her a paint set, and she began to paint in watercolours. She never formally studied art or painting but became a sought-after artist of landscapes, flowers, and herbs.

Brenkley was also a wood carver and produced domestic items such as tables, fire screens, umbrella stands, bookends, paper knives, breadboards, decorated boxes, and eggcups. These were created with a pocketknife and paintbrush. Brenkley admired Māori culture, and many of her items feature artistic elements of Māori style, such as using pāua shell for the eyes of carved figures.

A piece of her wood carving work was displayed in the women's section of the New Zealand Centennial Exhibition in 1939.

=== Personal life ===
When she was 18, she married saw-miller Thomas Brenkley. The couple lived most of their lives on their dairy farm in Norsewood-Ormondville and raised 10 children.

=== Legacy ===
In 1999, the Hawke's Bay Cultural Trust staged a solo exhibition of Brenkley's work entitled Jane Brenkley: A Path Through the Bush.
