= Justin Summerton =

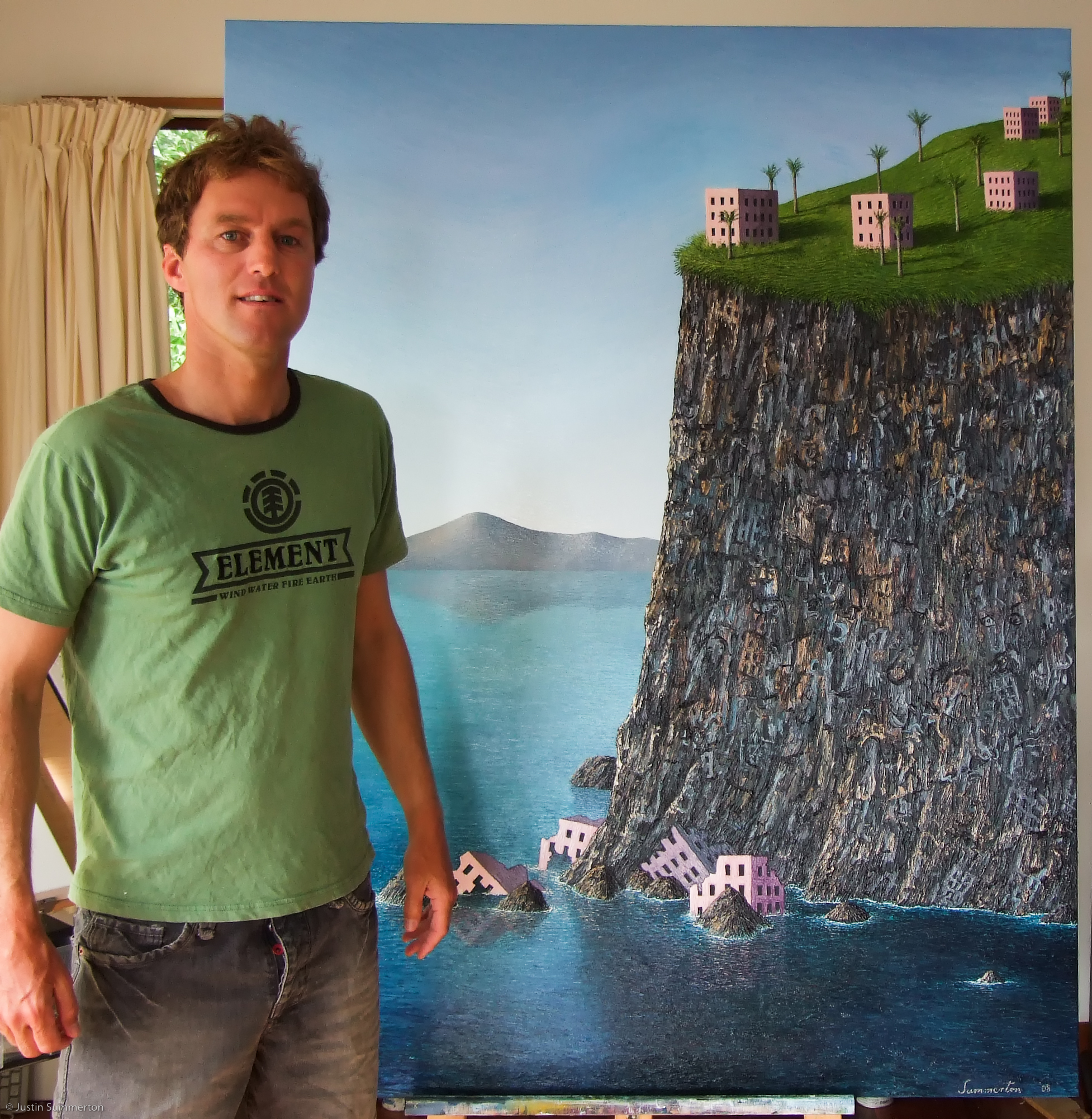
Justin Summerton, standing next to his work "Lemming Syndrome" (2008)

Justin Summerton is a New Zealand artist and writer, who lives in Dunedin, New Zealand.

== Early life and development ==
Justin Summerton was born in Wirral Peninsula, in North West England. In 1972, when he was four years old, his family emigrated to New Zealand, where he lives presently.

Summerton spent the next couple of decades in Dunedin. He completed a Bachelor of Commerce degree (1987) and a Bachelor of Arts degree (1993) at the University of Otago.

In 1990, Summerton got a studio flat at St Clair Esplanade, in Dunedin, where he did some of his early experiments with oils, working mainly with seascapes. The following year, he had his first solo exhibition, at O'Brooks Gallery in Dunedin.

== Travelling and street painting ==
In 1992, Summerton travelled to Liverpool. He rented a studio at the Bluecoat Chambers and worked on Liverpool cityscapes. He then went to paint and explore Paris, and then Copenhagen, in Denmark, where he was commissioned to paint a mural.

Two years later, he went to the United States. There, he exhibited in Detroit and began "live painting" in Central Park in New York City. He then continued with street painting in Nice, in the Côte d'Azur, South of France. In 1995, he worked in a log cabin in Mendocino, Northern California. At that time, he exhibited his photomontage projects and oil on canvas at the International Art Café, in Haight-Ashbury, San Francisco.

A year later, he was working at a studio in Redfern, in Sydney, Australia. While living there, he exhibited in a group show at the Darlinghurst Gallery, and he contributed with a photomontage study to the first Australian auction of contemporary photography at the Wemyss Gallery.

In 1997, Summerton did paintings and photomontage studies of Tenerife (Canary Islands), Spain, Portugal, and London (live painting at Leicester Square).

From 1997 to 1999, Summerton was based in Dunedin, working on his technique and basing his work around the St Clair seascape. In 1999, being a keen surfer, he based himself in Karekare, west of Auckland, living initially at Bob Harvey's bach. He is currently based in St Clair, Dunedin.

== Themes and technique ==
Summerton is a surrealist painter who depicts a dreamlike world in his work, often presenting New Zealand as a primeval landscape. In his work, Summerton reveals a fascination with New Zealand natural elements, such as the sea, volcanic cones, mountains and cloud formations, which constitute the basis of all his work. His latest paintings have been described as inhabiting "a strange milieu halfway between representational landscape and surrealist dreamscape." The artist makes the landscapes his own, by rearranging and/or adapting them to his vision, obeying to symbolic or allegorical purposes.

The surrealist painter favours a utopian New Zealand: "Most of my art is related to the ecology of the world," Summerton says. "I'm not a hippy, greenie painter who rants on, but maybe I am an environmentalist. New Zealand is a bit of an oasis like that and I've had that theme running through my work for a while."

"Summerton's works harness the raw energy of New Zealand landforms and coast lines through the texture of his paint. He captures and intensifies this power with layers upon layers of dense oils, culminating in a landscape that is far from traditional, and so referring to New Zealand landscape with a fresh perspective."

At a recent solo show of his paintings, his technique was described as "scrumbling", a "brushstroke technique to build layers of colour and texture onto the canvas surface. This approach tends to modify rather than obscure the previous layer and creates stark contrast between dark and light pigments. The overall result is a fresh and vibrant new view of the New Zealand landscape."

Summerton has been identified as one of the New Zealand contemporary artists whose work is being thrown into the investment fine art market within only a few years of being produced. He has one work in a public collection – the Aigantighe Art Gallery of Timaru, New Zealand – and another work (Lamp on a Pedestal, 2002) – in New Zealand's largest private collection, the Wallace Arts Trust Collection.

Summerton exhibits at the Warwick Henderson Gallery in Parnell, Auckland, and sells work regularly through the International Art Centre in Parnell, Auckland, New Zealand. Numerous works by the artist have been sold at auction, including Cape Byron Lighthouse (2008), sold at the International Art Centre 'Fine Art Auction' in 2009.

== Books ==
- 2013 – The Last Secret Wave (Kindle e-book)

== Awards ==
- 1999 Mainland Art Awards – Merit prize for "White Island, Night"
