= Edmund Gouldsmith =

English painter

Edmund Thomas Gouldsmith (10 July 1852 – 10 August 1932) was an English painter, noted for landscapes and marine studies, who spent three years in Adelaide, South Australia and three years in Christchurch, New Zealand.

== History ==
Gouldsmith was born in Chatham, Bristol according to one reference Clifton, Bristol according to a contemporary report, Bristol, and studied at the Bristol Government School of Art and the Royal College of Art or Royal Academy Schools at South Kensington. He worked five years with the city architect's office in Bristol, but left when he felt confident of making a living through his art. He arrived in Adelaide in 1883, and established a studio in rooms above E. S. Wigg & Son's stationery premises with the desirable feature of north-facing windows, but austere and with no pleasing outlook. He exhibited with the South Australian Society of Arts (misreported as the "Royal South Australian Society of Fine Arts"), of which no trace has been found. In 1886, he left for New Zealand, where he served as part-time art master at Christ's College, Christchurch and exhibited with the Canterbury Society of Arts 1887–1888 before returning to Britain, where he exhibited at the Royal Academy from 1891 to 1927.

The Art Gallery of South Australia commissioned several paintings from him, one of the River Onkaparinga at Echunga and one of ships and hulks at the Port River, and currently holds four watercolors, including a view of Adelaide from Montefiore Hill. The Christchurch Art Gallery once held his Seacoast.

== Other works ==
- A 43 cent postage stamp issued by the Australian Post Office in 1990 used as its subject the Adelaide Town Hall, from a watercolor painted by Gouldsmith.

== Gallery ==
Works by Edmund Gouldsmith

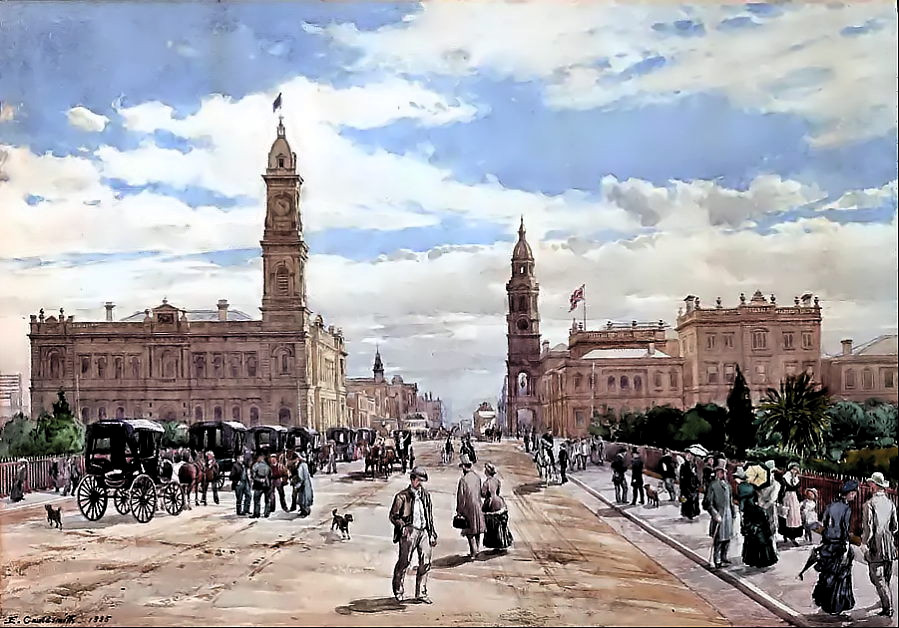
King William Street, Adelaide. 1885

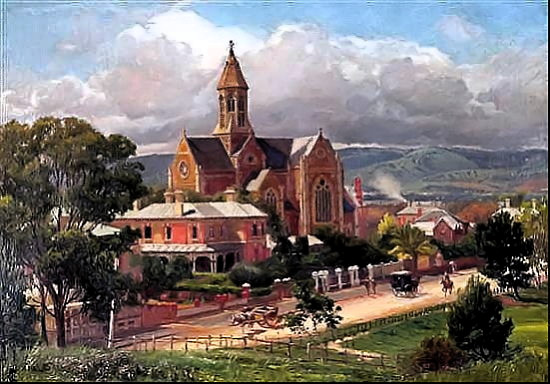
St Peter's Cathedral, Adelaide. 1885

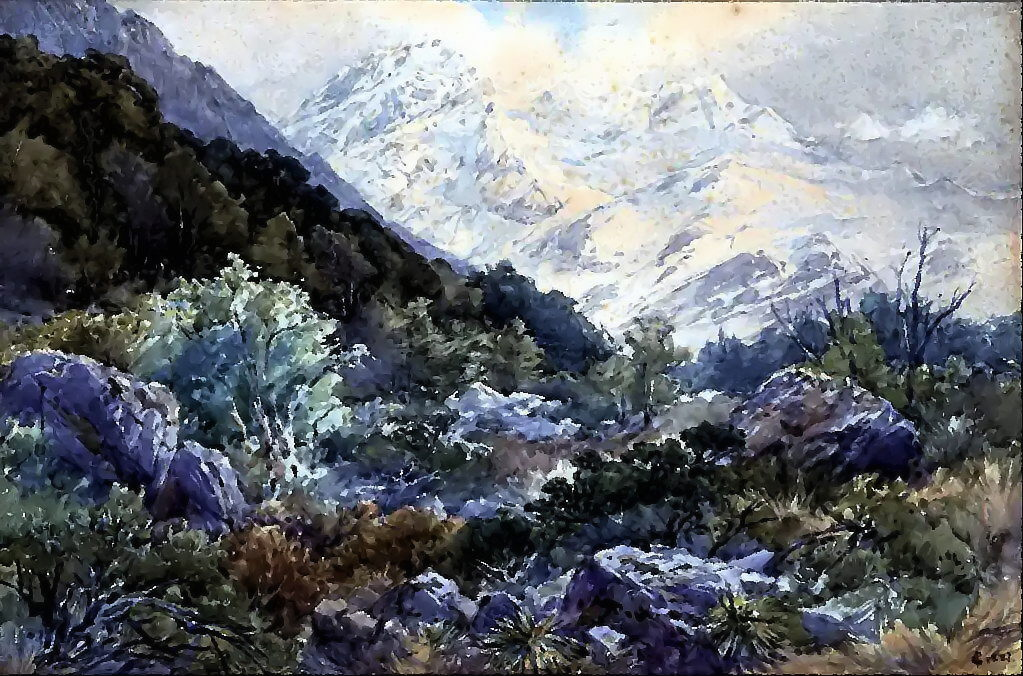
Mt Sefton, Southern Alps. 1887

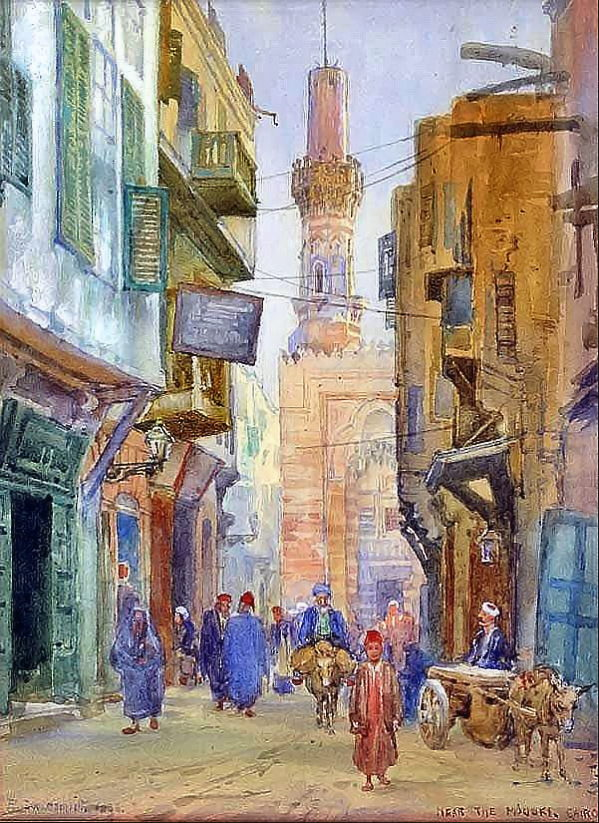
Near the Mosque. Street in Cairo. 1896

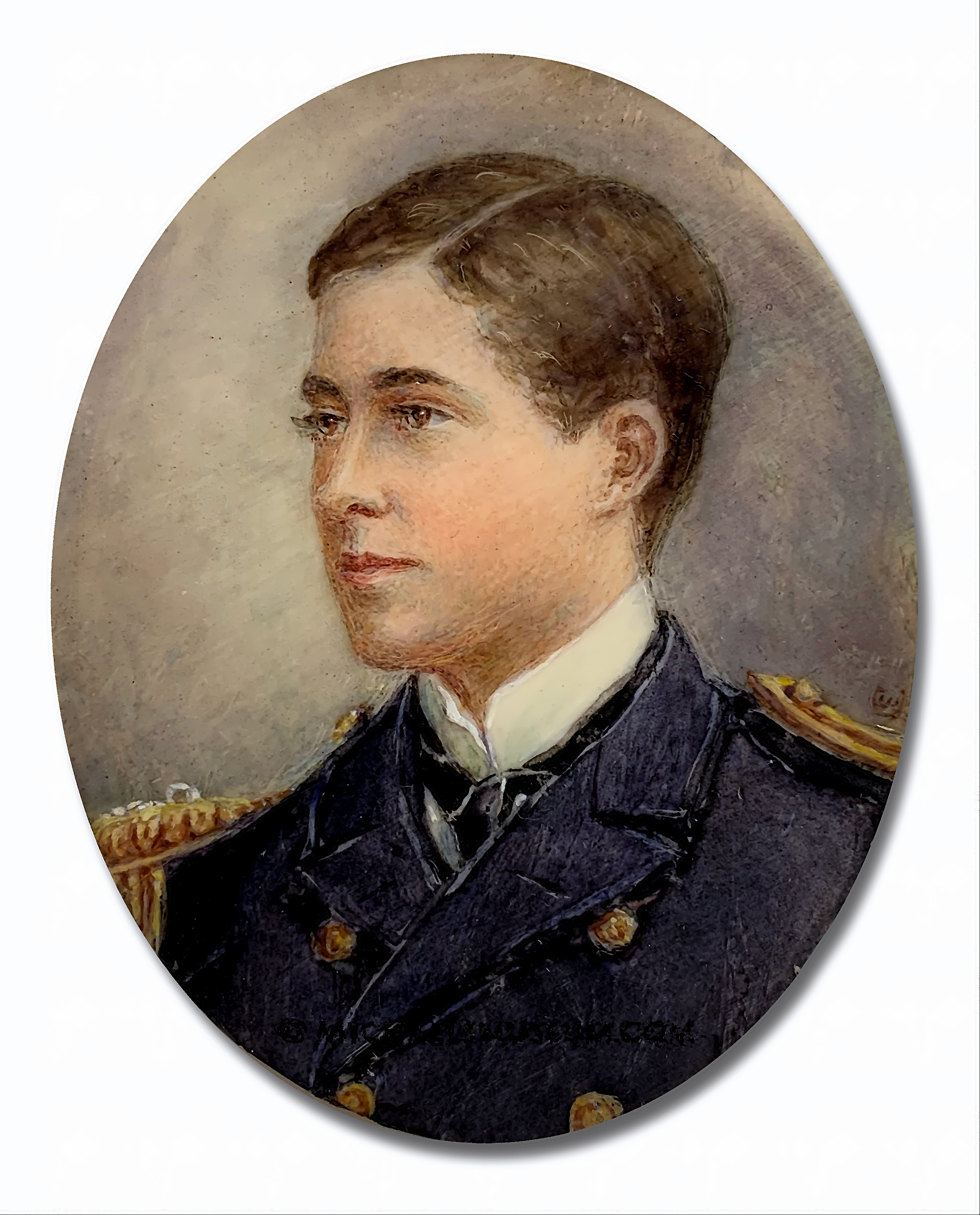
Portrait of George William Seymour Seton, a Lieutenant in the British Royal Navy. ca.1910
