= Pinepine Te Rika =

Pinepine Te Rika (1857–1954) was a New Zealand tuhoe woman of mana. Of Māori descent, she identified with the Tuhoe iwi. She was born in Rahitiroa, Bay of Plenty, New Zealand in about 1857.
