= Emma Camden =

English-New Zealand glass artist (born 1966)

- Born: Emma Camden; 1966 (age 58–59); Southsea, England
- Known for: Glass art
- Website: Emma Camden Website

Emma Camden (born 1966) is an English-New Zealand glass artist.

== Early life ==
Camden was born in Southsea, England.

== Career ==
Camden graduated from Southampton Institute of Higher Education in 1985, and completed at BA (Hons) in Glass with Ceramics at Sunderland Polytechnic in 1990. She moved to Auckland, New Zealand in 1991. A master class on the lost-wax method of casting with David Reekie introduced Camden to this method, which became the focus of her work.

== Recognition ==
In 1996, 1998, 1999, 2001 and 2005, Camden was made a finalist of the Ranamok Glass Prize (previously known as the RFC Glass Prize). In 1999, she was awarded the top prize at the Ranamok Glass Prize for her work Tower. Creative New Zealand awarded her arts grants in 2007 and 2014.

== Exhibitions ==
Major exhibitions include Filling the Void at the AVID Gallery in Wellington, in 2012, Solid at Koru Contemporary Art in Hong Kong in 2010, Luminaries in 2009 at the Sabbia Gallery Sydney and Pacific Light in 2007 at Chappell Gallery in New York.

From December 2015 to March 2016 the Sarjeant Gallery showed Emma Camden - Now, an exhibition of new and selected work. The exhibition focused on her larger and more architectural forms, rather than her more domestically scaled work.

== Collections ==
Her work is included in the collections of Museum of New Zealand Te Papa Tongarewa, the Auckland War Memorial Museum, The Dowse Art Museum, the National Art Glass Gallery in Wagga Wagga, Australia, the Queensland Art Gallery, the National Gallery of Australia, the Glasmuseet in Ebeltoft, Denmark, and Palm Springs Art Museum in the United States.
