= Alice Beville Collins =

New Zealand silversmith (1884–1973)

Alice Beville Collins (1884–1973) was a New Zealand silversmith.

== Biography ==
Collins was born in Christchurch and studied at the Canterbury College School of Art from 1910 to 1912. She exhibited metalwork and jewelry at the Canterbury Society of Arts exhibitions in 1911 and 1912, and in the Auckland Society of Arts exhibition in 1912. She also worked at her father's architectural firm, Collins & Harman, as a draughtswoman. After completing her art training Collins opened her own silversmith studio and business on Park Terrace in Christchurch.
