= Phillip Luxton =

New Zealand ceramicist

Phillip Luxton (b 1959) is a New Zealand ceramicist. He is self-taught and has been producing large scale works by hand since his early 20s. He is on the board of Ngā Taonga a Hineteiwaiwa A Treasury of New Zealand Craft Resources.

In 1988 he received a significant QEII Arts Council Grant and in the early 1990s Luxton collaborated with New Zealand painter Max Gimblett. In 2002 he exhibited with Barry Brickell at the Grantham Galleries in Auckland. The following year Luxton exhibited alongside Paratene Matchitt, David Trubridge and Jeff Thompson at the Art Out There exhibition held at the Ellerslie Flower Show.

He has work in the James Wallace Art collection and in 2001 won the Manukau Sculpture and Vessel Award.
