= Yona Lee =

South Korean-New Zealand artist (born 1986)

- Born: 1986 (age 39–40); Busan, South Korea
- Education: Elam School of Fine Arts, 2010
- Known for: Installation art combining stainless steel and everyday objects
- Notable work: In Transit (from 2016), Propositions (2021)

Yona Lee (Korean: 이요나; born 1986) is a South Korean-born New Zealand installation artist who works with stainless steel and everyday objects. She has held solo exhibitions around Australasia and been included in the Busan and Lyon Biennales. She is represented by Fine Arts, Sydney.

== Life ==
Born in Busan in 1986, Lee's family immigrated to New Zealand when she was 11. She graduated from Elam School of Fine Arts in 2010, where she now teaches. She is also a trained classical cellist, a skill she has incorporated into her installation work.

Lee has been awarded multiple residencies, including at the Jan van Eyck Academie in 2021–22.

Lee is known for In Transit, an installation series begun in 2016 at Alternative Space LOOP in Seoul, followed by Te Tuhi in Auckland, the Art Gallery of New South Wales, and Wellington's City Gallery. Her work is described as alluding to "the interconnected nature of the various spheres of human life."

Lee's work has been shown in internationally renowned institutions, such as the Busan Biennale; 15th Lyon Biennale of Contemporary Art; Seoul Museum of Art; Govett-Brewster Art Gallery; Gertrude Contemporary, among other institutions.

Exhibition catalogues:

- Yona Lee: An Arrangement for a Room in Seoul (2024), published by Art Sonje Center, with texts by curators Sunjung Kim, and Heehyun Cho.
- Yona Lee: Tangential Structures (2013), published by Enjoy Contemporary Art Space, with texts by curator Claudia Arozqueta, and Julia Lomas.
