= Alfred Sharpe (artist) =

Alfred Sharpe (1836–1908) was a New Zealand artist, architectural draughtsman, and writer. He was born in Tranmere, Cheshire, England, in about 1836.
