= Jeena Shin =

New Zealand painter

- Born: 1973 (age 52–53); Seoul, South Korea
- Education: University of Auckland; RMIT University, Melbourne
- Known for: painting
- Movement: Modernism
- Awards: C Art Trust Award (2014)
- Website: jeenashin.com

Jeena Shin (born 1973) is a New Zealand painter. Her work is geometric in style, and often monochromatic. Many of her projects are large scale and painted directly on the walls of public galleries.

== Early life and education ==
Shin was born in Seoul, South Korea. Shin received a Bachelor of Fine Arts from the University of Auckland in 1997 and a Masters of Fine Arts from RMIT University, Melbourne in 2000. In 2011 she participated in the 'International Residency Exchange Programs' at the Art Studio of the National Museum of Modern and Contemporary Art in South Korea.

Shin is resident in Auckland, New Zealand.

== Exhibitions ==
In 2016 she was included in the exhibition Necessary Distraction: A Painting Show at Auckland Art Gallery Toi o Tāmaki. Notable exhibitions at Two Rooms (Auckland) have included Reflection Reflection (2012), Motus (2014), and Over Under Sideways Down (2015–6 with Selina Foote and Jan van de Ploeg). In 2009, she was commissioned to create a large-scale wall painting 23 metres (75 ft) x 7 metres (23 ft) at Dunedin Public Art Gallery.

== Awards ==
In 2014, Shin was the inaugural winner of the C Art Trust Award.
