= Chiara Corbelletto =

Italian-born New Zealand artist

- Born: 1956 (age 68–69); Biella, Italy
- Education: University of Milan
- Known for: art, sculpture, design

Chiara Corbelletto (born 1956 in Biella, Italy) is an Italian-born New Zealand artist. Corbelletto's public sculptures in Auckland include Twins (2003) at the Grafton Campus of the University of Auckland, Numbers Are the Language of Nature (2005) at the Auckland Domain, and 1001 Spheres (2023) at Monte Cecilia Park. Corbelletto has artworks in the collections of Te Tuhi and Te Papa.

== Biography ==
Corbelletto was born in 1956 in Biella, Italy. She trained as an artist in Italy, studying at the University of Milan. She arrived in New Zealand in 1981, after which she spent the next six years working as an art restorer.

Corbeletto moved her studio to the Corban Estate Arts Centre around the year 2004. In 2005, Corbelletto unveiled Numbers Are the Language of Nature, a sculpture in the Auckland Domain commissioned as a part of Outdoor Sculpture 2001, to create a sculpture walk within the Domain. The maquette of the sculpture is held at Auckland War Memorial Museum.

Corbeletto's 1001 Spheres was unveiled in 2023 in Monte Cecilia Park, Auckland, to mark 125 years of women's suffrage in New Zealand.

== Artistry ==
Art historian Michael Dunn feels that Corbelletto's works occupy "a position somewhere between abstraction and figuration".

== Sculptures ==
- Twins (2003), located at the Grafton Campus of the University of Auckland.
- Numbers Are the Language of Nature (2005), located in the Auckland Domain.
- Paremuka Bridge (2005) woven designs, Rānui/Western Heights, Auckland.
- White Delta and Archimede (2008), two polypropylene sculptured purchased by Te Papa in 2008.
- Binary (2014), at Massey University, Palmerston North.
- The façade of the Te Atatū Peninsula Library (2014), Te Atatū Peninsula, Auckland
- 1001 Spheres (2023), located in Monte Cecilia Park, Auckland

== Exhibitions ==
- Arche the Beginning (1988), Gow Langsford Gallery, Grey Lynn, Auckland
- Scultura (1990), Gow Langsford Gallery, Parnell, Auckland
- Essenza and Affinita (1997), Fisher Gallery, Pakuranga

== Gallery ==
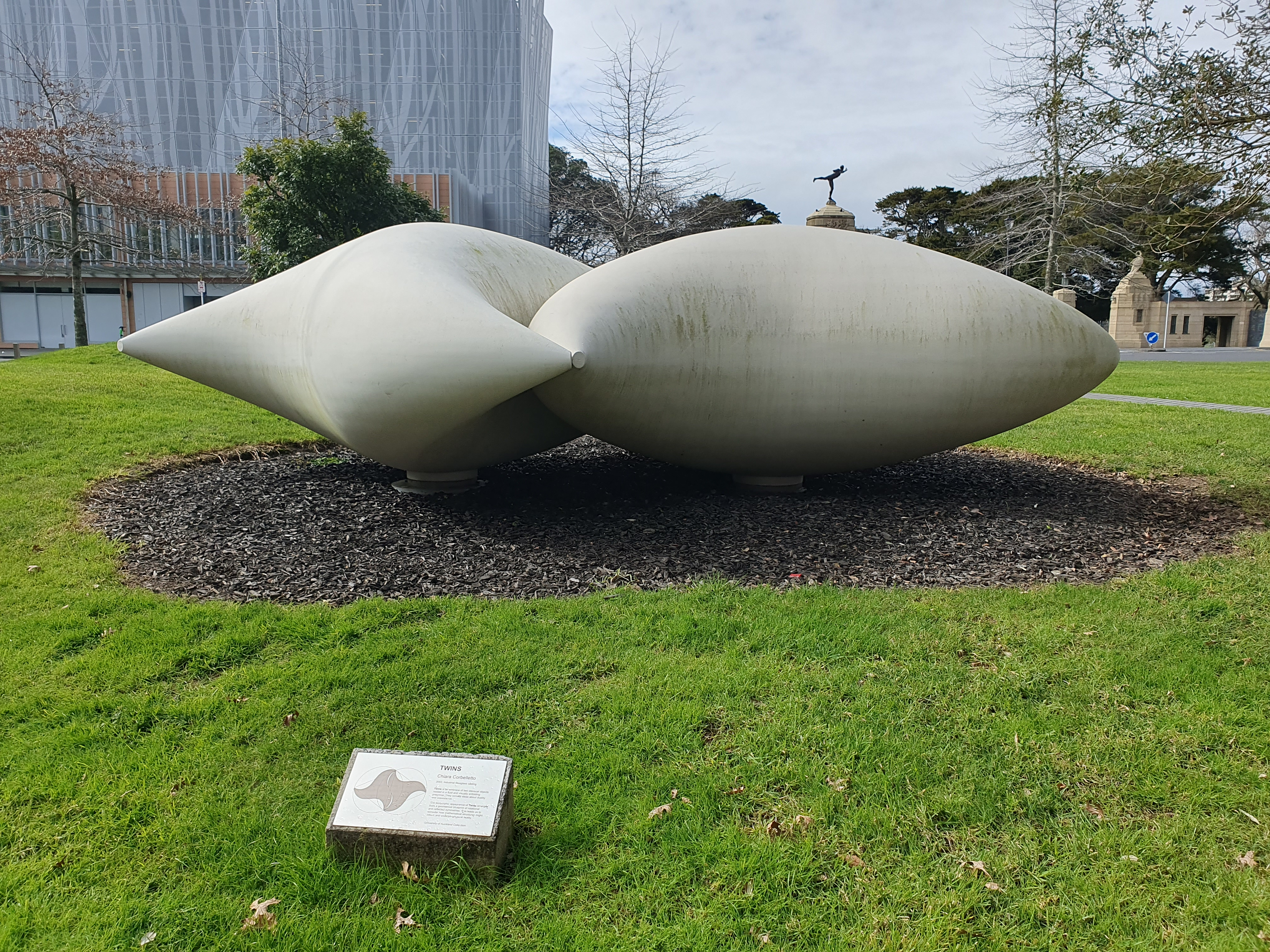
Twins (2003), sculpture at the Grafton Campus of the University of Auckland

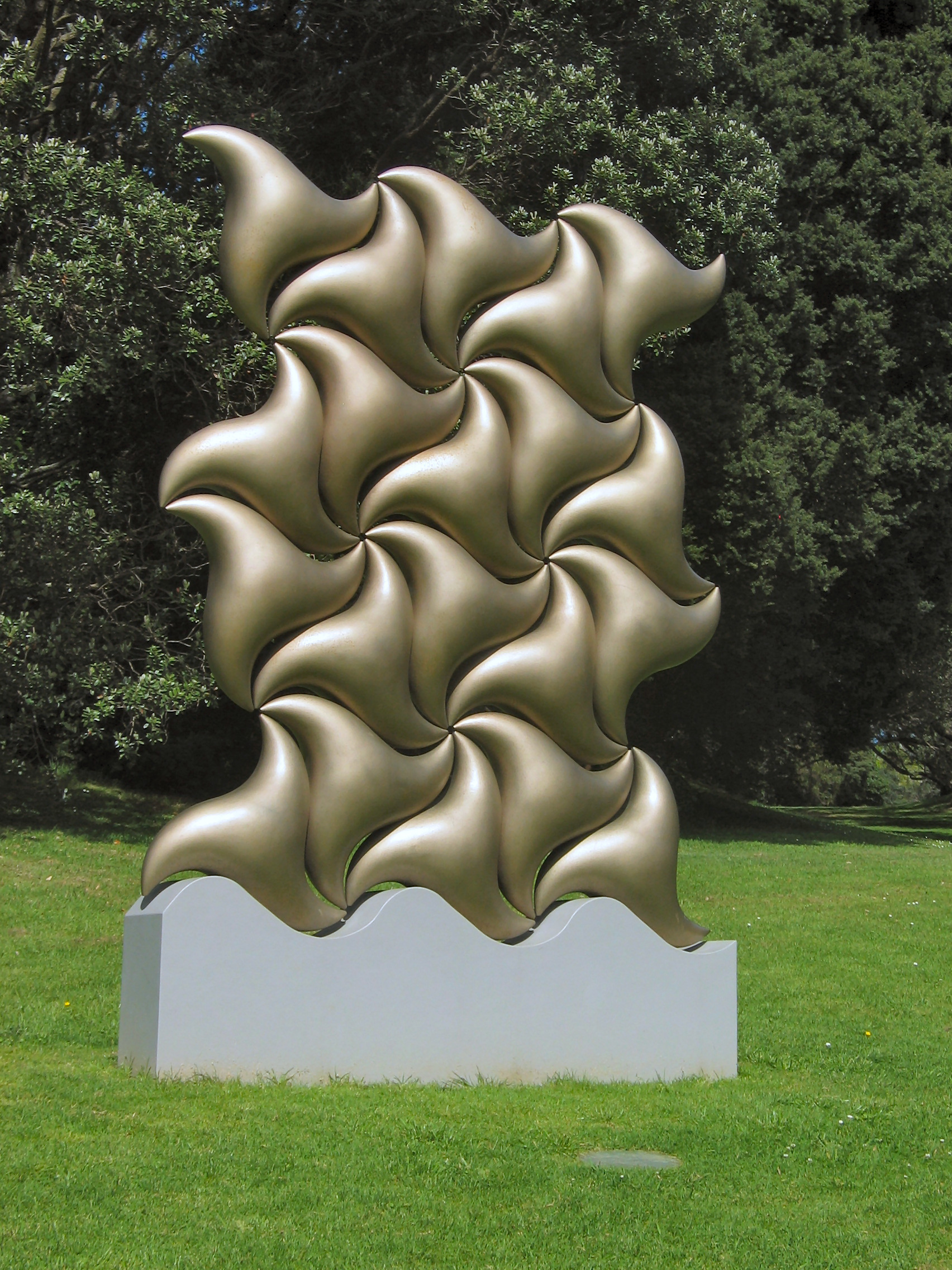
Numbers Are the Language of Nature (2005) in the Auckland Domain

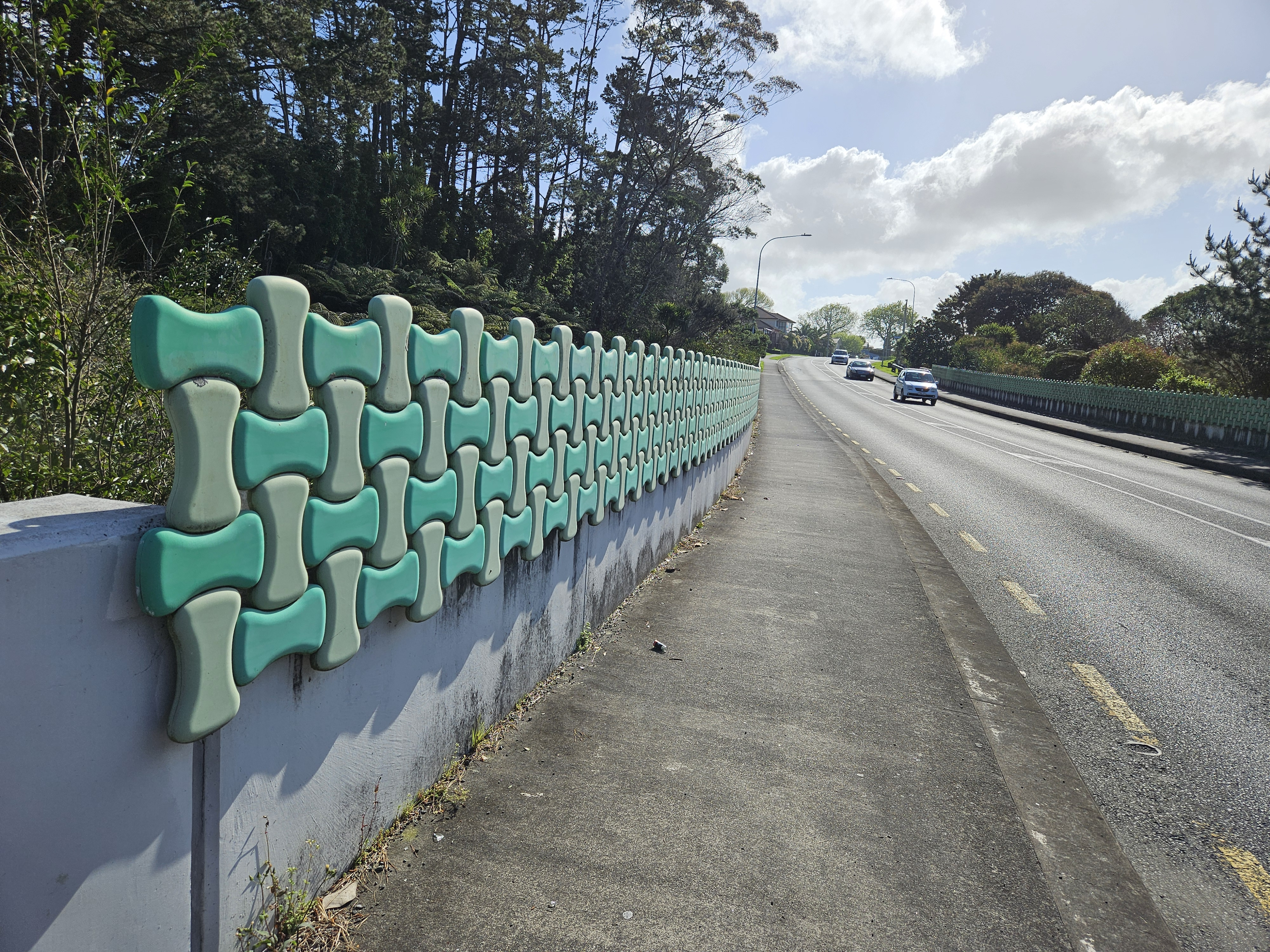
Woven designs on Paremuka Bridge (2005), between Rānui and Western Heights in West Auckland

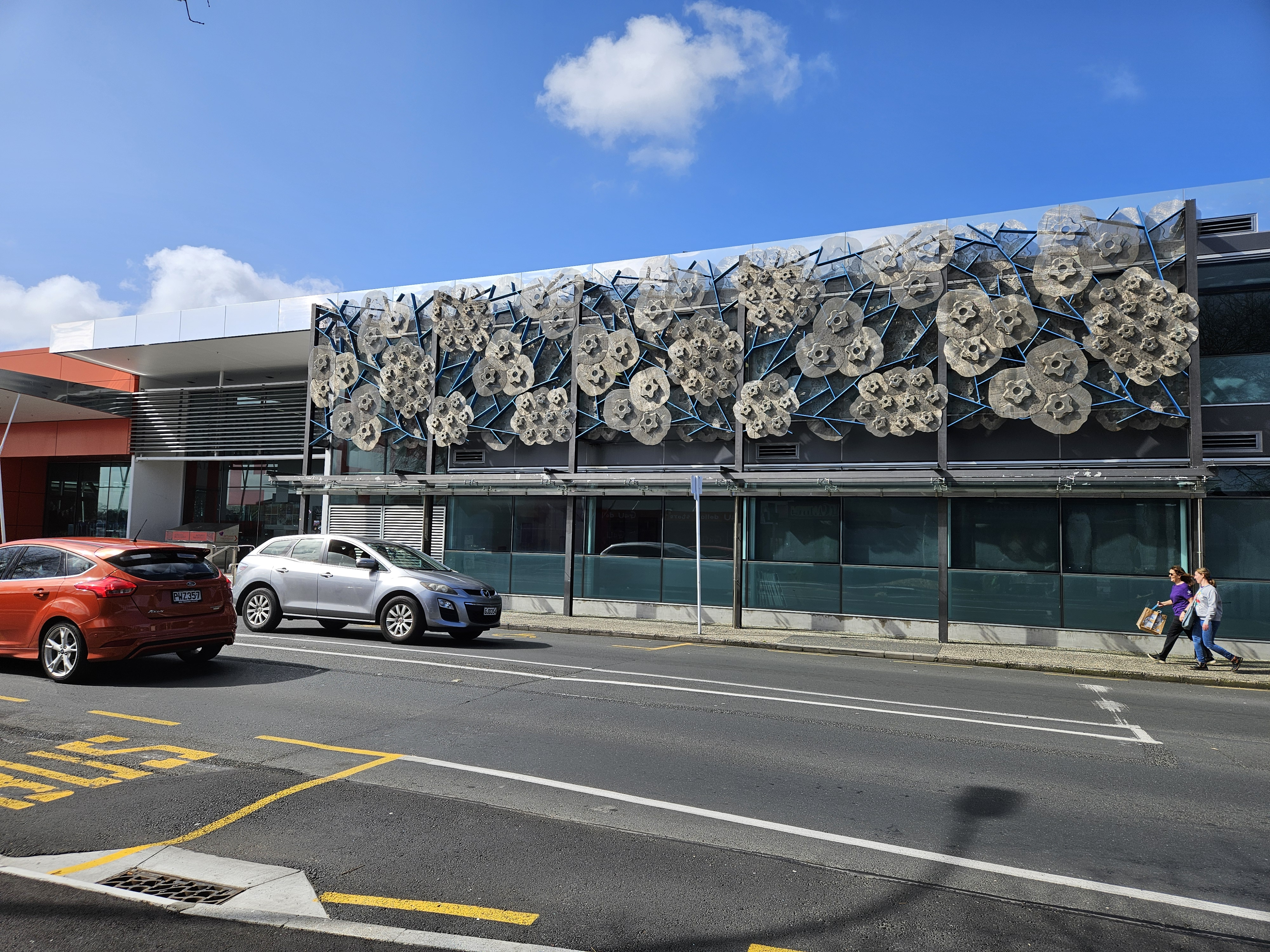
The façade of the Te Atatū Peninsula Library, constructed in 2014

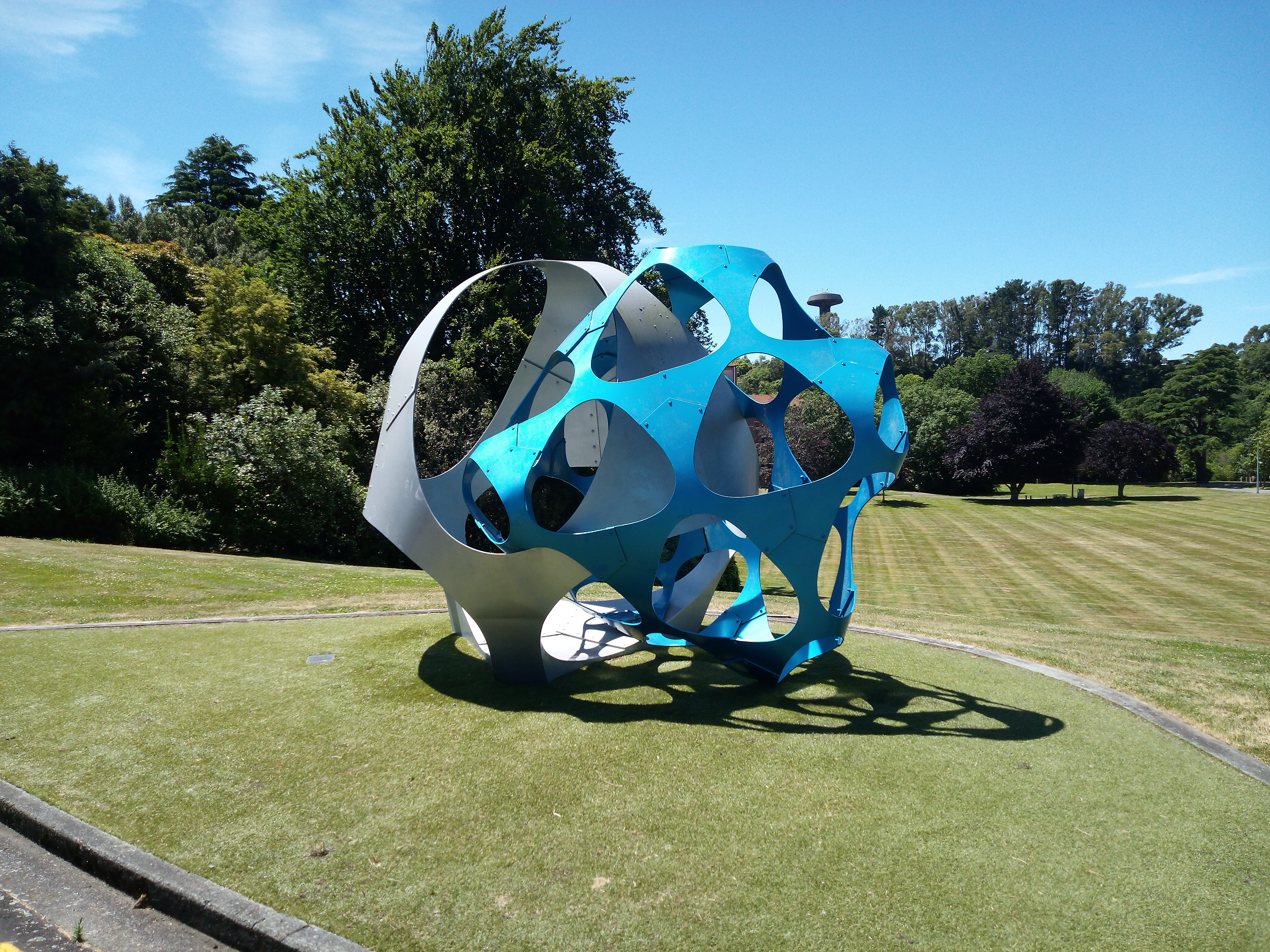
Binary (2014), sculpture located at Massey University's Palmerston North campus

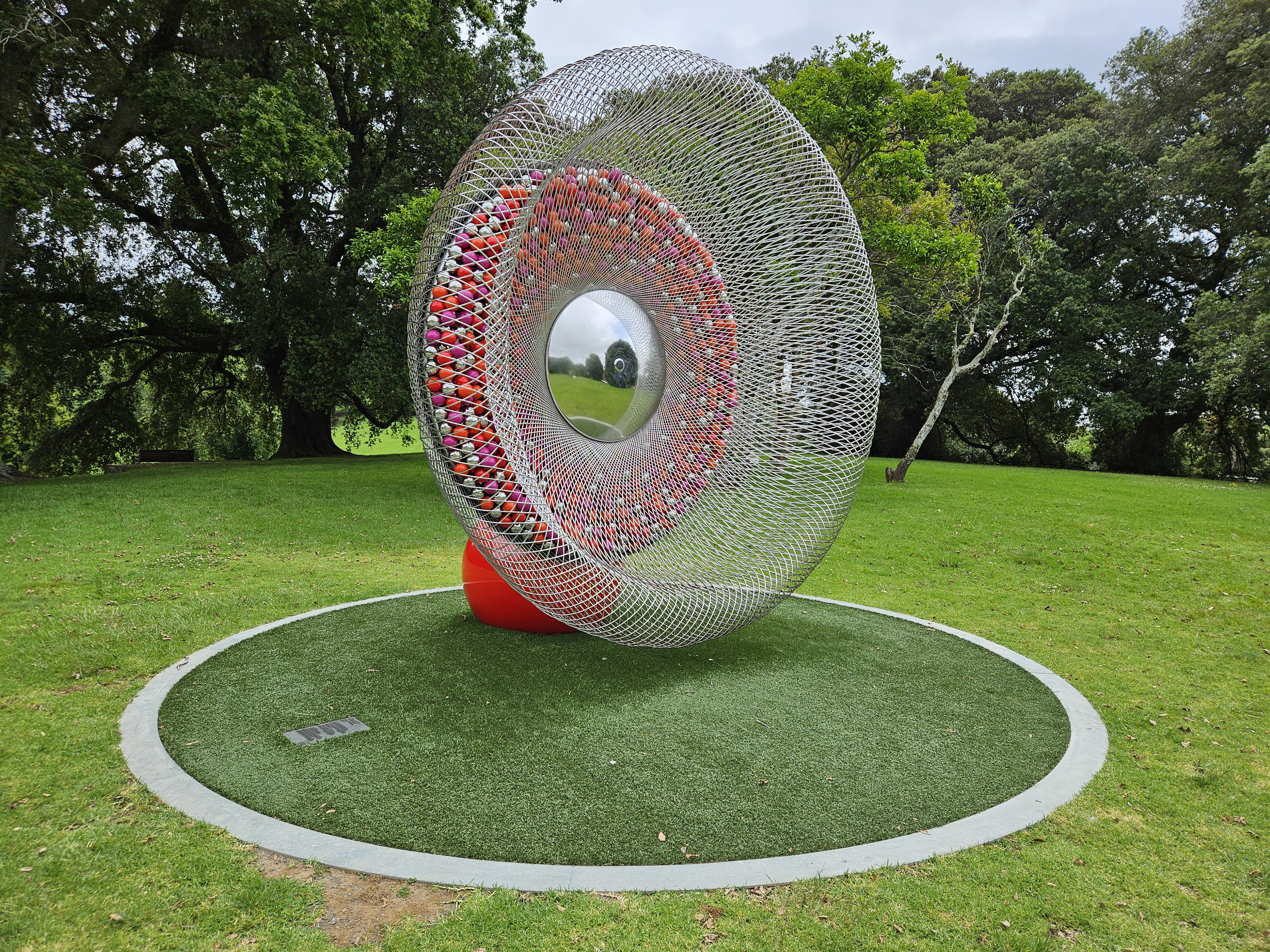
1001 Spheres (2023), located in Monte Cecilia Park, Auckland
