= St David's Memorial Church, Auckland =

Centre for music in Auckland, New Zealand

St David's Memorial Church
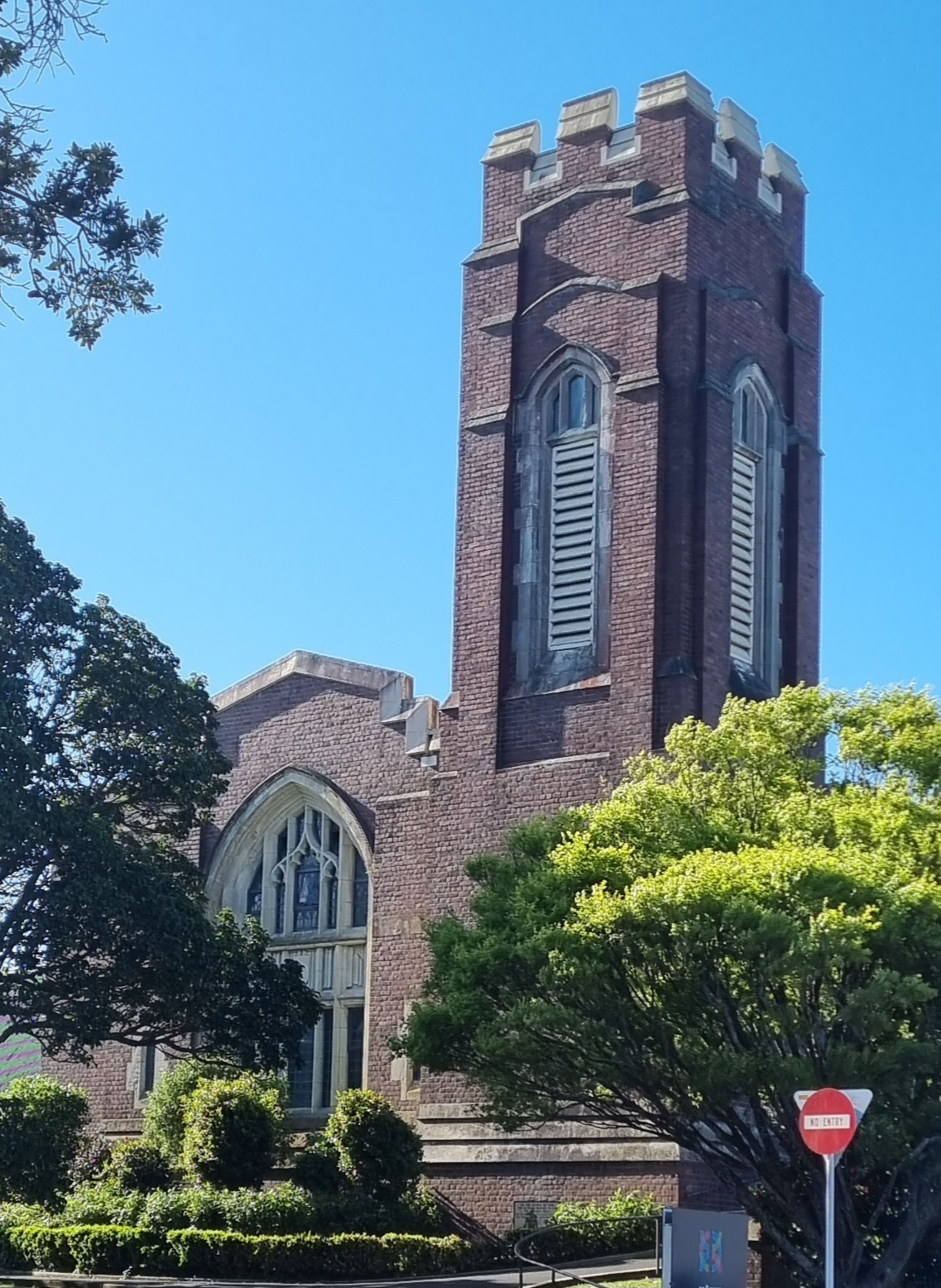
- St David's Memorial Church in 2023
- St David's Memorial Church
- 36.86410°S 174.76344°E
- Address: 68-70 Khyber Pass Road, Grafton, Auckland
- Website: www.kahuistdavids.nz

Architecture
- Completed: 13 October 1927

St David's Memorial Church, Auckland is a former Presbyterian church on Khyber Pass Road in Grafton, Auckland, New Zealand. St David's Memorial Church replaced an earlier wooden church and was constructed as a First World War memorial church. The Gothic Revival building was constructed from Kamo brick and Oamaru stone. In 2020 the Presbyterian Church vacated the building later selling it to a trust that established a music and community centre in the building.

== History ==
The first St David's Church was built in Symonds Street in 1864 and replaced in 1880. In 1902 the wooden church was removed to its current site in Khyber Pass Rd; a section of land originally granted to the Commanding Royal Engineer, Captain George Augustus Bennett (1807–1845).

In 1920 planning for a new church began and a decision made that it would be a memorial to soldiers who had fought and died in the First World War. Local architect Daniel Boys Patterson designed the church in the Gothic revival style. The foundation stone for the new church was laid on Anzac Day 25 April 1927. The foundation stone inscription read “To the Glory of God and in proud memory of the St. David’s men who, for the permanent peace of the world, gave their lives in the Great War, 1914-18, this stone was laid by Duncan Macpherson, senior elder, Rev. D. C. Herron, M.C., M.A., minister.”

The church with its square Gothic tower was built of red Kamo brick and Oamaru stone. The interior is brick with rimu wood panelling, jarrah floor and oak pulpit. The organ was built by George Croft a New Zealand organ builder.

The church was opened on 13 October 1927.

=== War memorials in the church ===
The first two memorials were unveiled in the church in 1920 to honour St David's parishioners who had served in World War I: a wooden roll of honour for men and nurses who had served and a marble memorial tablet inscribed with the names of those who had died.

More plaques and tablets were added after World War II. Names of those who had died in World War II were added to the existing memorial tablet. Two more tablets were unveiled: one in memory of those who died in World War I who belonged to the No. 3 Field Company of Engineers and another for those in the 1st Field Company New Zealand Engineers who died in World War II. Three plaques commemorate World War II in the Pacific and a stained glass window remembers both world wars. A Sappers Memorial Chapel opened in 2006.

Two notable soldiers had links to St David's: Cyril Bassett who was married in the church in 1926 and Samuel Forsyth.

== Closure and preservation ==
In 2014 it was found that the church did not meet earthquake codes and there was a possibility of it being demolished. In response Paul Baragwanath, who was a descendent of church ministers, set up the Friends of St David's Trust and developed a plan to save the church. Property developer and philanthropist Ted Manson was the Trust's founding patron.

The church, but not the adjacent hall, was given an Auckland City Council Category A heritage status in 2019 following a recommendation made in a heritage report in 2017. The church is included in Heritage New Zealand's Upper Symonds Street Historic Area.

The final service in the church was held in 2020. In 2021 the Presbyterian church planned to sell the church, adjacent hall and car park but the Friends of St David's wanted a covenant placed on the church to preserve it. The three properties were bought by Ted Manson in 2021.

== Fundraising ==
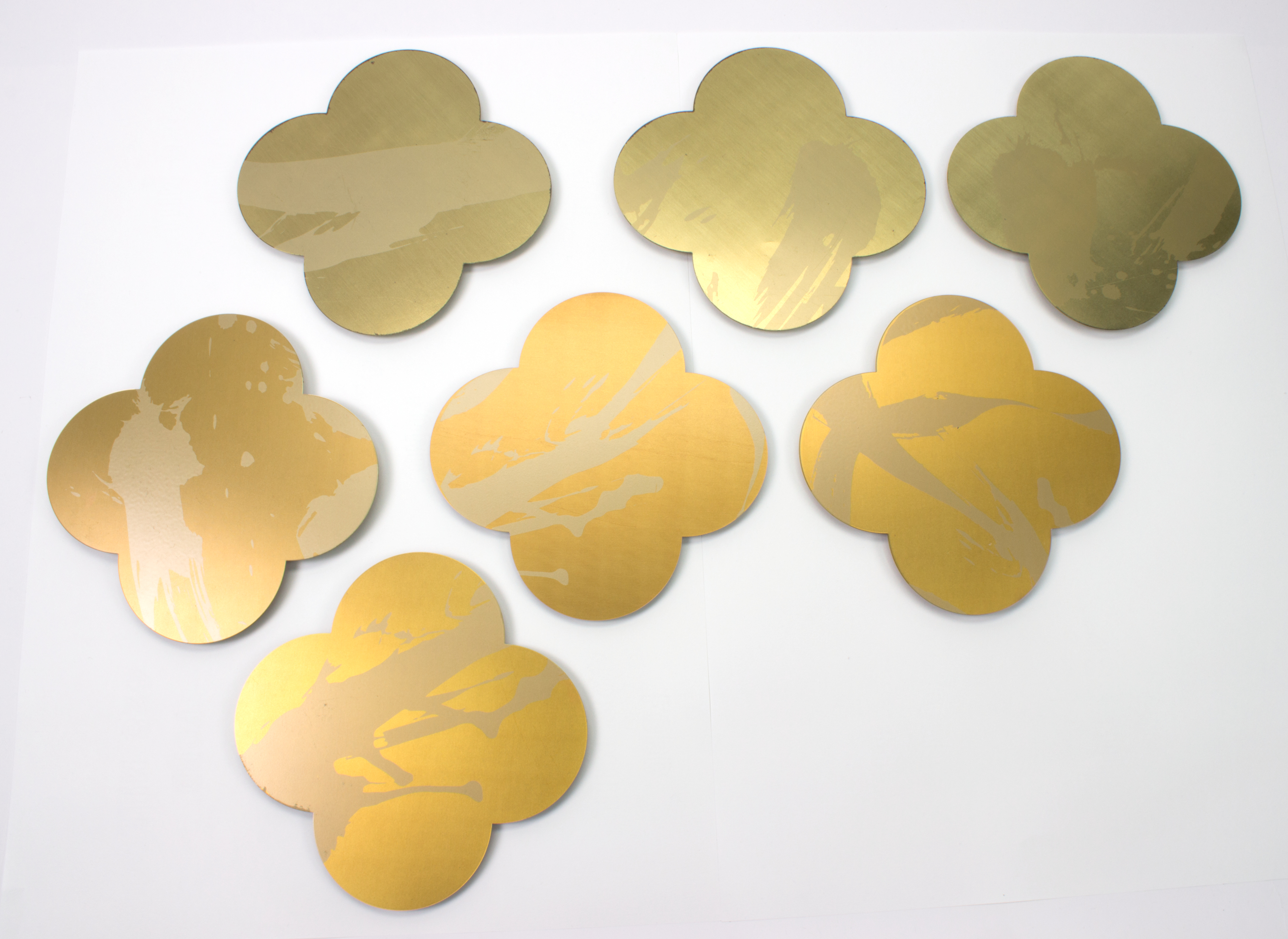
Quatrefoils by Max Gimblett

In 2015 artist and former parishioner Max Gimblett created an art installation called The Art of Remembrance. It consisted of 7000 brass quatrefoils which were hung on the outside of the church. The display opened on Anzac Day and was closed three months later by Willie Apiata. It was both a memorial to New Zealanders who served in World War 1 and a fundraiser to save and restore the church. From the sale of the quatrefoils and donations the Trust raised $1 million. Some of the quatrefoils were later displayed outside the Auckland War Memorial Museum and at Te Papa in Wellington.

Jewellery artist Warwick Freeman designed a special brass pin which was released to coincide with a light show at the church for the 2018 Anzac Day commemorations; the pins were sold to raise funds for the preservation of the church.

Further fundraising has continued with art works Colour Quartet by Sara Hughes displayed for sale in 2023.

== Kāhui St David's ==
Kāhui St David's music and community centre opened progressively from 2021, and fully by 2023. An Anzac memorial event for the 28th Māori Battalion was held in 2024.
