= Kregar =

Kregar is a surname. Notable people with the surname include:

- Gregor Kregar, New Zealand-Slovenian sculptor
- Josip Kregar, Croatian sociologist, jurist and politician
