= Darryn George =

New Zealand artist (born 1970)

Darryn George (born 1970) is a New Zealand artist based in Christchurch.

== Education ==
George trained as an artist at the Ilam School of Fine Arts in Canterbury and graduated with a BFA in painting in 1993. He subsequently completed a Diploma in Teaching, and then, studied towards a MFA (painting) at the Royal Melbourne Institute of Technology. George is the Head of the Art Department at Christ’s College in Christchurch.

== Career ==
Darryn George, Atua, 2011, oil on canvas

George connects minimalist abstraction and the politics of photographic reproduction which has long influenced New Zealand art. George explores the contrast between the sheen and glossy photographic images accessible in books and the textural quality of paintings when encountered in real life. Whereas George uses abstract patterns that recall the pristine and hard-edged aspect of photographic representations in books, his paintings also include subtleties on the surface such as ridges and wobbly lines differentiating it from photographic reproductions.

George has an interesting work process. While he principally works with oil on canvas, George primarily envisions his works on computer screens playing around with size, colours, motifs, orientation and texture, adding and amending elements which have been present in his work since 2003. Such experiments result in a group of images which become paintings and other which George archives on his computer. George’s paintings contain both abstract and figurative designs including numbers, symbols and words. The palette for George’s works remains strongly connected to its place and Maori heritage as does the range of symbols which can be found in his paintings such as the kowhaiwhai, tā moko and koru patterns.

George has exhibited widely around New Zealand and Australia and is represented by several galleries including Gow Langsford Gallery in Auckland, Brooke Gifford Gallery in Christchurch, Peter McLeavey Gallery in Wellington and The Gallery at Woollaston in Nelson.

== Awards ==
George has received several awards over the years:

- 1994 Te Waka Toi Grant
- 1998 Arts Council of New Zealand Grant for Melbourne Project at SPAN Galleries
- 2000 Finalist in Wallace Art Award
- 2000 Creative New Zealand funding for Melbourne Art Fair
- 2004 Te Waka Toi Grant
- 2007 Deutsche Bank Head Office NZ commission

== Selected bibliography ==
Amery, Mark. ‘Tauiwi’, Techno Maori: Maori Art in the Digital Age, (Exhibition CDRom Catalogue), City Gallery, Wellington, 2001, 1-16
Baker, Jonathan. ‘Matapihi; Darryn George’, (Review), CS ARTS, Issue 26, March 2006, 11
Boyce, Roger. ‘Lines of Descent’, Art News, Spring, 2005
Brown, Deidre. Navigating Te Kore – Maori Artistic Identity in the Digital Age, Techno Maori: Maori Art in the Digital Age (Exhibition CDRom Catalogue) City Gallery, Wellington, 2001, 1-9
Brown, Deidre. The Whare on Exhibition, in Lydia Wevers and Anna Smith, On Display: New Essays in Cultural Studies, Victoria University Press, Wellington, 2004, 65-79
Brown, Deirdre and Lara Strongman. Darryn George. Auckland: Gow Langsford Gallery, 2010
George, Darryn. Evisible: A Millennium Art Project, Christ’s College, Christchurch, 2000
Highfield, Smith. Pushing the Boundaries-Eleven Contemporary Artists in Aotearoa New Zealand, Gilt Edge Publishing, 2004, 18-23
Johnstone, Jocelyn. Art teachers aiming to make big impression, Sunday Star Times, 5 July 2000
Kedgeley, Helen. The Koru Club, Pataka Art Gallery catalogue, 2005
Mane-Wheoki, Jonathan. Tipuna, Catalogue for Span Galleries Show, 2004
McCormick, Deborah. Scape, Art and Industry Urban Arts Biennial 02, Catalogue, 1-5, 10, 2000
Milburn, Felicity. Hiko! New Energies in Maori Art. Robert McDougall Art Gallery
Moore, Christopher. 'Arena of Abstract Art,' The Press, 28 June 2000
O’Brien, Gregory. Bro Town Boogie Woogie, FHE Galleries catalogue, 2005
Paton, Justin. ‘Devotional Signs on a Cross-Cultural History,’ The Press, 25 May 1994
Pauli, Dorethee. ‘Demanding Hip Hop’, The Press, 22 August 2001
Rewi, Adrienne. ‘Art Teachers studying modern in traditional setting’, Sunday Star Times, 18 June 2000
Tipa, Moana. Unfolding Language, Chrysalis Seed publication, 2006

== Personal life ==
George is of Ngāpuhi descent. He lives in Christchurch.
