= Boom Boom (sculpture) =

Dinosaur sculpture in New Zealand

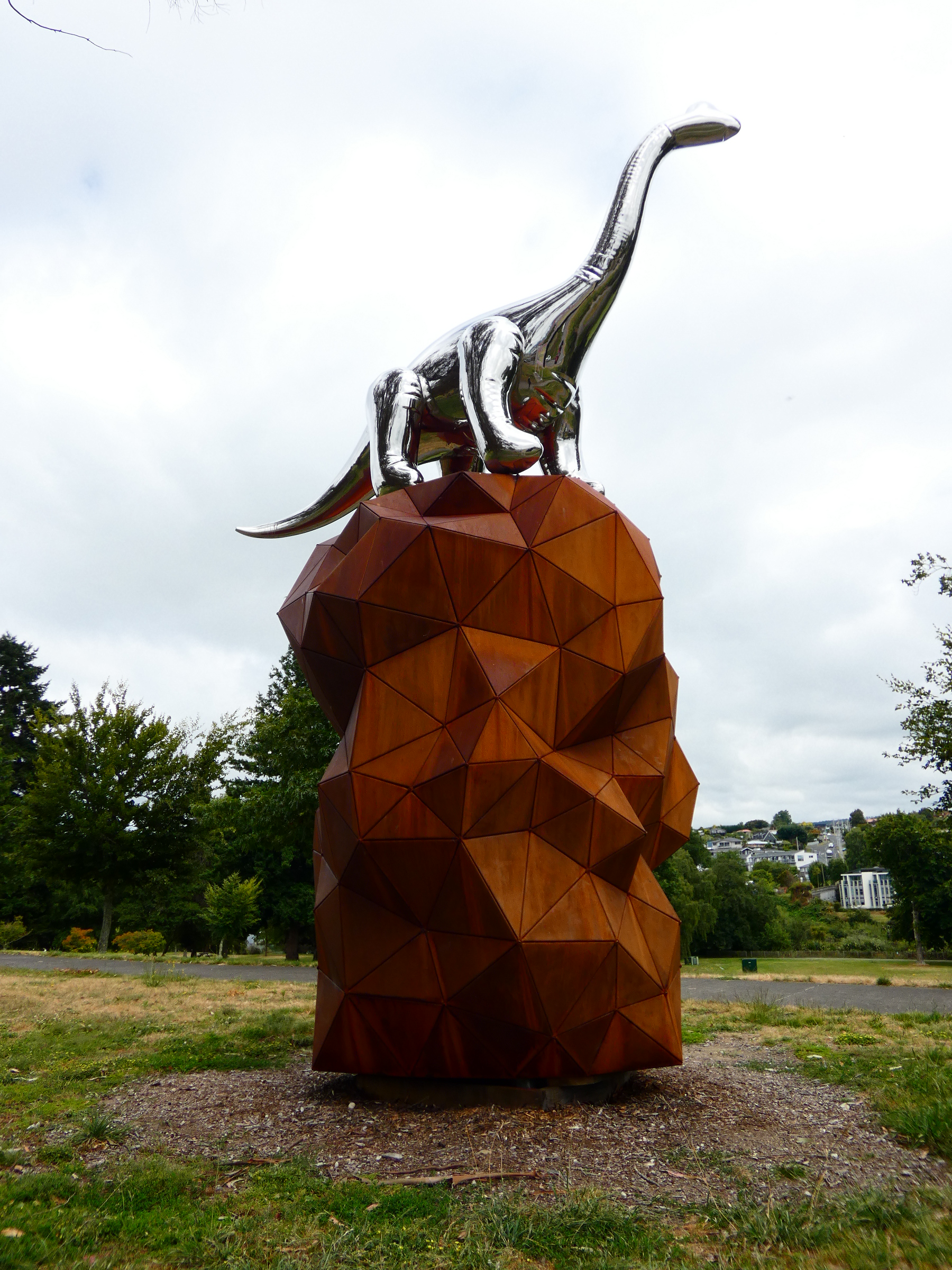
- Boom Boom in 2026
- Artist: Gregor Kregar
- Year: 2025
- Location: Taupō, New Zealand; 38.683°S 176.070°E

Boom Boom is a sculpture of a stainless steel dinosaur on the top of a steel rock in Taupō, New Zealand. Designed by sculptor Gregor Kregar and funded by the Taupō Sculpture Trust and the Taupō District Council, the sculpture is located in the district's Riverside Park and was installed there in May 2025. The public's opinion of the sculpture has been mixed and it has featured in several memes.

== Description ==
The sculpture was designed by the Slovenian-born New Zealand sculptor Gregor Kregar. It is 7 metres (23 ft) tall with a stainless steel dinosaur sitting on the top a 'geometric' weathering steel rock. The sculpture was inspired by the volcanic history of Taupō and the Taupō Volcano, one of the world's largest volcanoes. The rock represents large stones that have been created by the volcano in previous eruptions. A dinosaur was used as the animals had previously lived in the Taupō area. It was inspired by sauropods, which once occupied New Zealand.

== History ==
In 2018 the Taupō District Council agreed to spend $100,000 on a 'destination sculpture' in the district if the Taupō Sculpture Trust could raise the same amount. This sculpture would be Boom Boom, commissioned by the trust for a new sculpture trail in the Riverside Park of Taupō. There were plans to put 21 sculptures along the trail. In November 2023, the district council granted resource consent for the construction of the trail. Due to the large size of the sculpture and the land's zoning, Boom Boom was deemed a building, requiring resource consent. In February 2024 the council approved the installation of Boom Boom and the funding of $100,000 towards it. This was described as 'contentious' by the Waikato Times; two councillors voted against the decision, stating that the money would be more effectively spent elsewhere. The sculpture was unveiled at the park in May 2025, becoming the first sculpture in the trail, at a total cost of $230,000.

== Reception ==
The public's reaction to the sculpture after it was unveiled was mixed. Many people did not like the sculpture, some of whom used the joke that it was an "eyesaur". The concerns by its opponents was that the funds from ratepayers could have been more effectively spent elsewhere, and that the sculpture did not appear to have any relevance to Taupō. The sculpture was however inspired by the area's volcanic history. The Taupō Sculpture Trust and the artist has said that they expected negativity at first, and expected a reversal in public opinion.

The sculpture has received some international media coverage, including in the United Kingdom, Australia, United States and India. Several people have created memes using the sculpture, and a few businesses have used it in AI-generated advertising. For example, a golf club has modified an image of the sculpture to make the dinosaur appear to be playing golf. The general manager of a local tourism company has said about this media publicity that "no $200,000 ad campaign could have matched" it.
