= Thomas Broham =

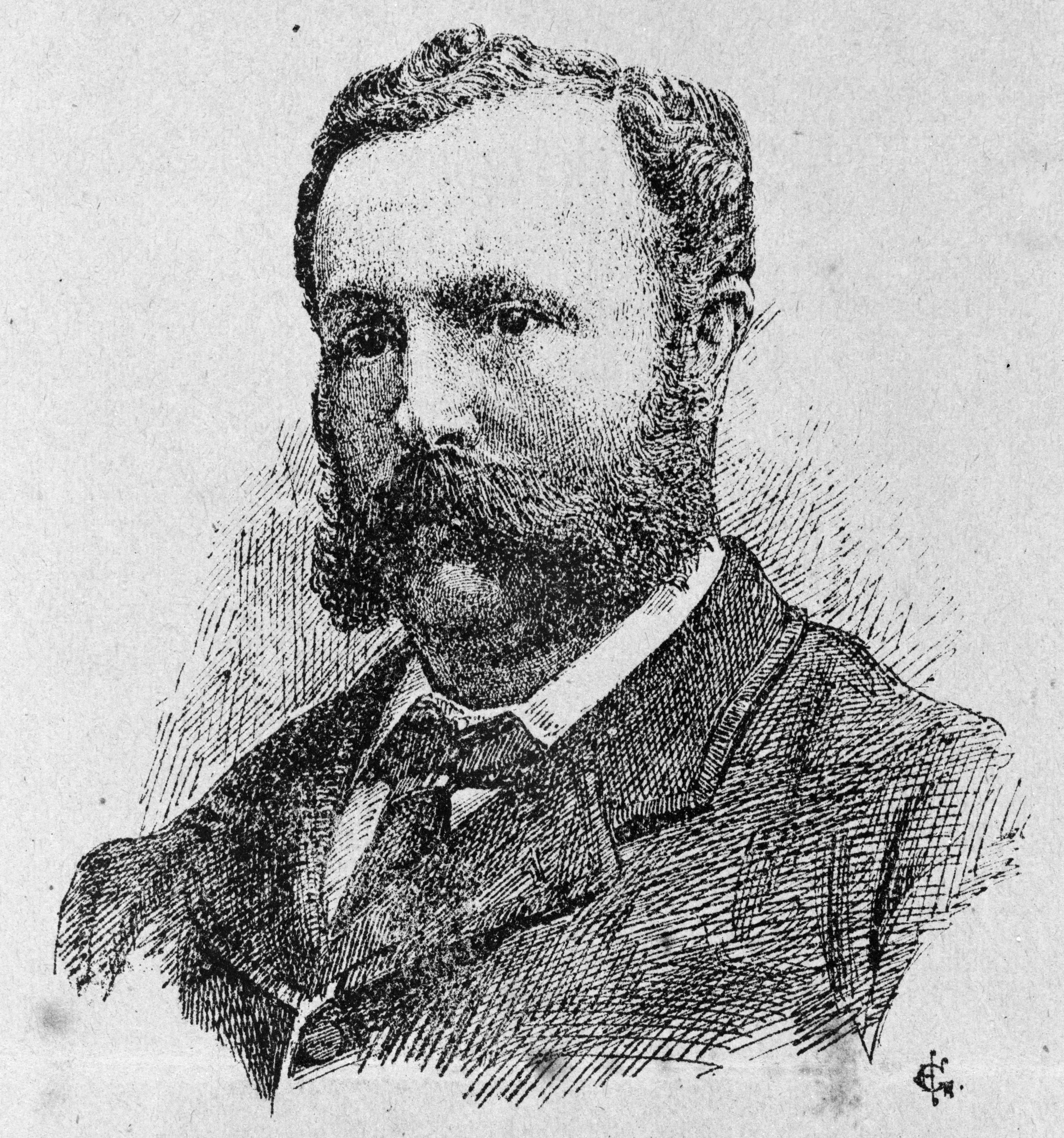
- Inspector Broham ca 1886
- Born: 20 July 1840; County Limerick, Ireland
- Died: 29 December 1900 (aged 60); Rome, Italy
- Occupation: police officer
- Years active: 1859 - 1900
- Known for: arrest of Cyrus Haley; Henry Cain poisoning case
- Spouse: Helen Govett (m. 1882–1900)

Thomas Broham (20 July 1840 – 29 December 1900) was a New Zealand police officer. He was born in County Limerick, Ireland on 20 July 1840.

He is known for arresting the arsonist Cyrus Haley.
