= Cyrus Haley =

New Zealand arsonist (1832–1875)

- Born: John Cyrus Haley; 22 September 1832; Leeds
- Died: 4 October 1875 (aged 43); Moray Place, Dunedin
- Cause of death: shot dead during escape attempt
- Convictions: three life sentences for: attempted murder; threatening to kill; threatening to destroy property

Cyrus Haley (22 September 1832 – 4 October 1875) was a New Zealand arsonist. He was born in Leeds, Yorkshire, England on 22 September 1832 and migrated to Auckland, New Zealand, in 1870.

Haley burned down the Music Hall, the ship City of Auckland, a kerosene store, part of the New Zealand Insurance Company building, and the Choral Hall, which had been built to replace the Music Hall. On 22 January 1872 he fired eight shots into businessman Thomas Russell's home at the Pah farm. He was apprehended by police officer Thomas Broham on 28 January 1872 after setting on fire haystacks at the farm. He was convicted of attempted murder, threatening to kill and threatening to destroy property, and sentenced to life in prison. He was shot dead in 1875 while attempting to escape from a labour gang.
