= Gow Langsford Gallery =

Commercial art gallery in Auckland, New Zealand

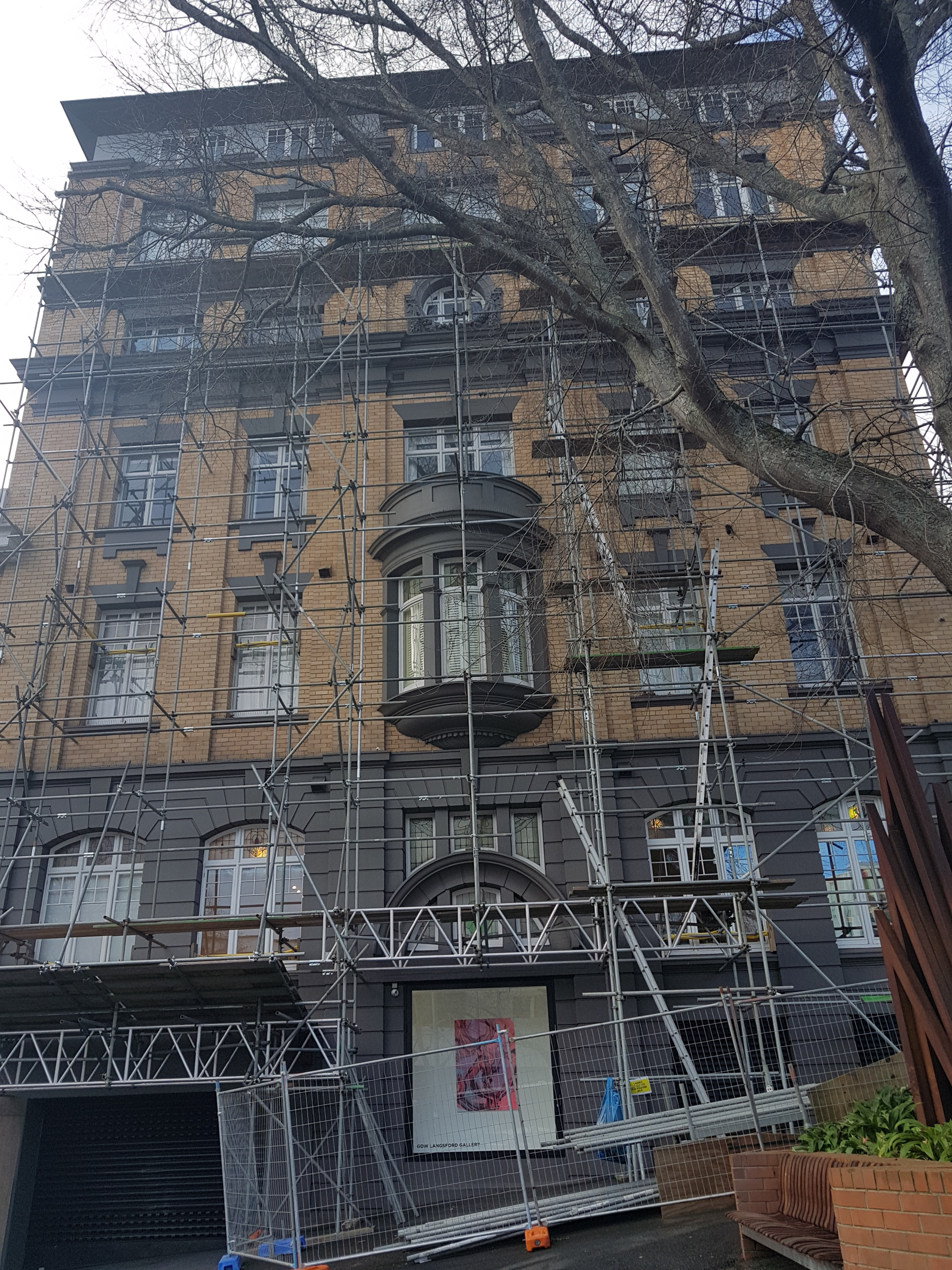

General information
- Type: Art Gallery
- Location: 28/36 Wellesley Street East, Auckland, Auckland 1010
- Coordinates: 36.85103°S 174.76590°E

Gow Langsford Gallery is a commercial art gallery in Auckland, New Zealand. The gallery was established in 1987 by John Gow and Gary Langsford. Gow Langsford represents many significant New Zealand and international artists, including Max Gimblett, Jacqueline Fahey, Paul Dibble and Dick Frizzell. It has hosted one-man shows by Pablo Picasso (1998), Damien Hirst (2010), Bernar Venet (2006 and 2012), Donald Judd (2002), Tony Cragg (2005 and 2011) and Andy Warhol (2013), and is regarded as one of New Zealand’s most influential dealer galleries.

Gow Langsford has two Auckland premises, one in the inner city, with a larger space in Onehunga.

Gow Langsford was previously associated with John Leech Gallery, whose origins can be traced back to the mid-19th century.

== History ==
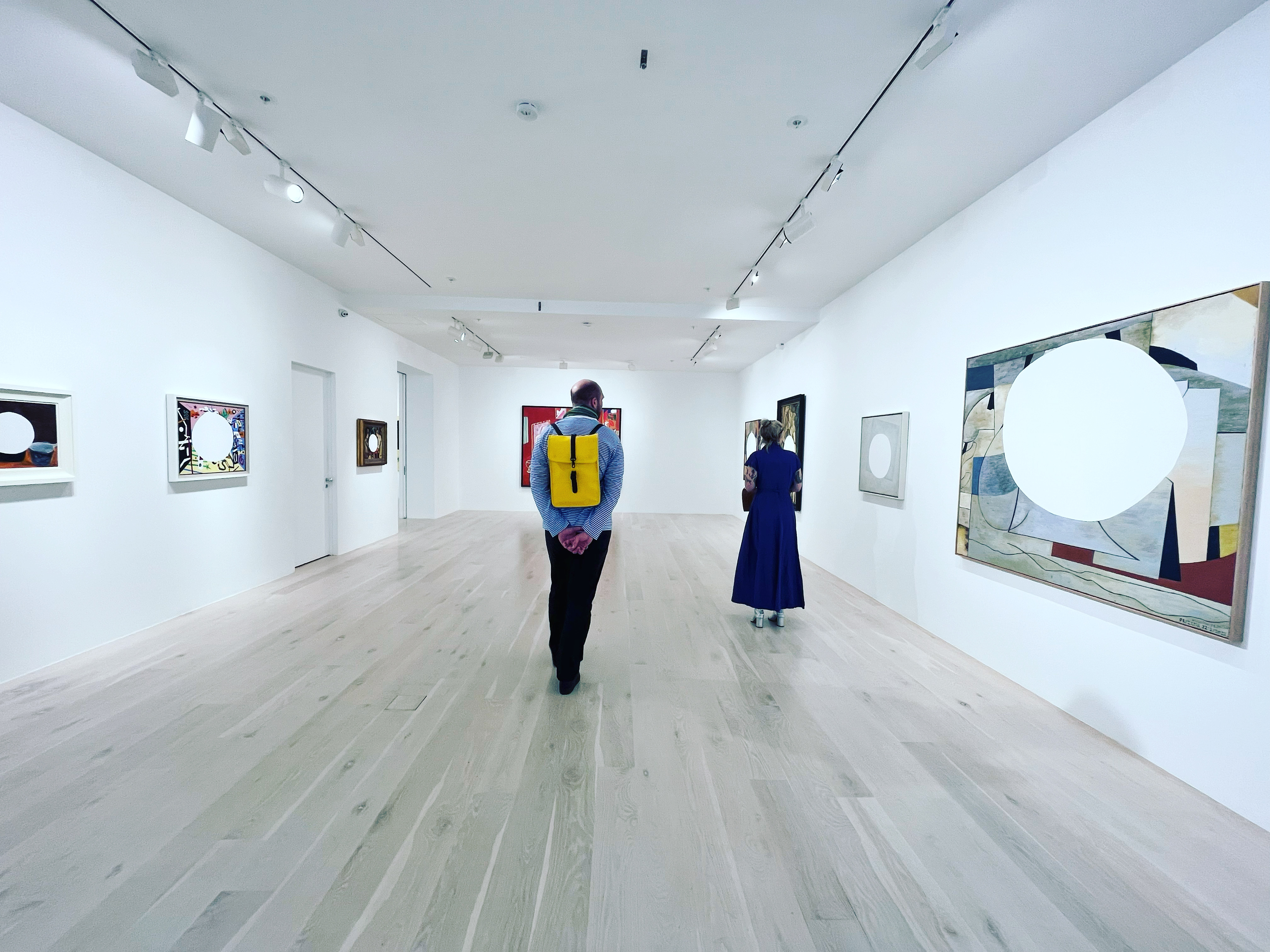
Interior of the Gow Langsford Gallery

Gary Langsford and John Gow jointly founded the gallery in 1987 in a disused Richmond Road petrol station in Grey Lynn. The gallery opened with a group show that included Dick Frizzell, Judy Millar, Greer Twiss and Allen Maddox. Two months later, the stock market crashed and the gallery building's value was halved from what Gow and Langsford had paid for it.

In 1990 the gallery moved to The Strand, and then again in 1992 to Kitchener Street, directly opposite the Auckland Art Gallery, its current premises. Between 2002 and 2004 Gow Langsford had a Sydney location on Danks Street, and between 2008 and 2021 another Auckland location on Lorne Street.

Anna Jackson, formerly a gallery manager, became director of the gallery in 2015 and co-owner in 2020. In the 2018 New Year Honours, John Gow and Gary Langsford were both appointed Members of the New Zealand Order of Merit.

Gow Langsford has mounted more than 500 exhibitions around the country and many abroad. In the years preceding the 2020 COVID-19 pandemic the gallery participated in international art fairs and showed at Art Basel Hong Kong and Sydney Contemporary.

Gow Langsford Gallery's stable of represented artists is now composed primarily of established artists from Australasia, but has also attracted artists from Europe and America.

The gallery has sponsored an annual Gow Langsford Gallery Art Prize, awarded to an outstanding recent visual arts graduate who has demonstrated excellence and resilience in their field.

== Present ==
In 2024, Gow Langsford opened a new flagship gallery in Onehunga. It is one of the largest commercial art spaces in Australasia, featuring a premium gallery space, dedicated viewing rooms, studios for promising artists, and an extensive visual arts library. This location offers an exhibition programme of cutting-edge contemporary art, along with curated exhibitions of modern and historic art. The gallery still retains its central Auckland premises directly opposite the Auckland Art Gallery. It represents both new and established artists and has mounted around 500 exhibitions since it opened its doors. Through their constant and varied exhibitions, Gow Langsford wishes to expose their artists to different types of audiences, hence, providing a forum for contemporary art on both the local and international scene.

In 2025, there was a solo exhibition of Philip Clairmont for the first time in 30 years.

Gow Langsford's recent exhibitions included works by several notable artists: Jacqueline Fahey, Tony Cragg, Max Gimblett, Dale Frank, and John Pule.

== Represented artists ==
- Tony Cragg
- Max Gimblett
- Laurence Aberhart
- Katharina Grosse
- Dale Frank
- John Pule
- Judy Millar
- Darryn George
- Jacqueline Fahey
- Paul Dibble
- Dick Frizzell
- Lisa Roet
- John Walsh
- Michael Hight
- Alex Monteith
- Reuben Paterson
- Chris Heaphy
- Bernar Venet
- Allen Maddox
- Sara Hughes
- Karl Maughan
