= Dale Frank =

Australian artist

Dale Frank (born 1959) is an Australian contemporary artist best known for his biomorphic abstract paintings. His practice has included found object-sculptures, performance installations, drawings, and paintings with sculptural elements.

== Early life and education ==
Frank was born in 1959 Singleton, in the Hunter Valley, New South Wales, Australia.

At the age of 19 he moved overseas to pursue a career as an artist in Europe and the United States. In 1998 he returned to live in Australia permanently.

== Career and art practice ==
Frank's artistic explorations in the mid-1970s consisted of abstracted landscapes and assemblages that contained materials such as hardwoods and furniture. Later his performance-based sculptures included: staging an elaborate lighting and sound disco together with a DJ at Roslyn Oxley9 Gallery, Sydney, and the Canberra Contemporary Art Centre; and installing eight large professional pool tables and associated paraphernalia of a Pool Hall, at the Institute of Modern Art in Brisbane.

From 1981 to 1994 Frank created surreal large-scale drawings composed of intense tightly-held lines. These were exhibited in Sydney at the Art Gallery of New South Wales, as part of the 1982 Biennale of Sydney, as well as in New York and Amsterdam.

In 1994, as a sculpture installation at the National Gallery of Australia, in Canberra, Frank installed speakers that played out across the entry forecourt a continuous repeat of five David Bowie albums.

Around 1995 Frank started using varnish as the sole material of monochromatic paintings. In 2002 he introduced colour and experimented with chemicals. He created abstract paintings in vibrant colours using a distinct technique of layering thick varnish. Although he did not invent this technique, he developed and refined his particular methods to create a personal aesthetic. Australian curator and writer Stuart Koop wrote: "Since 2001 I'd suggest, Frank's paintings don't depict or represent anything. Rather in a scientific sense they illustrate the behaviour of different painting materials, in isolation or in combination with others".

The titles of his paintings are phrases invented or overheard that "read like short stories", Sam Jinks and Elizabeth Newman wrote in 2015: "The works' titles remind us of Frank's creative intercession in these chemical exchanges: snippets from life conversations, things read, influences at large, big and little ideas that might suggest a subject, but perhaps better reflect the life of the artist in parallel - forming a montage whose doubtful inherent logic might still truly reflect the chaotic complexity of influence".

Australian art critic Andrew Frost opined in 2013 that Frank's work is not affected by recent theories or passing fashions; however his works at that time ascribed to the "expanded notion" theory of painting: sculpture as well as performance could be considered in as part of the painting medium.

Frank moved from working on canvas to Perspex, which he said added a new dimension to the work "spatially and conceptually". The reflective nature of Perspex alters the paint quality, and in addition the work becomes a "performance", activated and completed when the viewer stands before it.

In 2014 Frank donated 85 works valued at A$4 million to the National Gallery of Australia, which was the most significant gift by a living artist since Arthur Boyd's gift in 1975. Gallery director Ron Radford described Franks as "one of Australia's most important painters".

== Exhibitions ==
Frank's work has been exhibited widely, both in Australia and internationally.

Solo museum exhibitions include a survey show in 2000 at the Museum of Contemporary Art Australia in Sydney, Dale Frank: Ecstasy – 20 Years of Painting.

In 2010 Frank participated in the 17th Biennale of Sydney.

He has held numerous exhibitions at commercial galleries including Roslyn Oxley9, Anna Schwartz, Gow Langsford, and Neon Parc.

His work was included in the Venice Biennale, both in the Aperto section in 1984 and in the collateral exhibition Personal Structures in 2013.

In 2015 there was an exhibition of Frank's work at Neon Parc in Melbourne, which included sculptures created with found objects.

In 2022, an Frank's work at the 55th Art Cologne in Cologne, Germany.

A solo exhibition, Showers and Growers, will be mounted at the National Art School Gallery in Sydney.

== Recognition ==
At the age of only 16, Frank was awarded the Red Cross Art Award by John Olsen.

Frank was awarded the 2005 Arthur Guy Memorial Painting Prize from the Bendigo Art Gallery, worth A$50,000.

== Publications ==
- Dale Frank (Craftsman House, 1992)
- So Far: the Art of Dale Frank 2005-1980 (2007)
