= Cyril Bassett =

Recipient of the Victoria Cross

Cyril Bassett VC
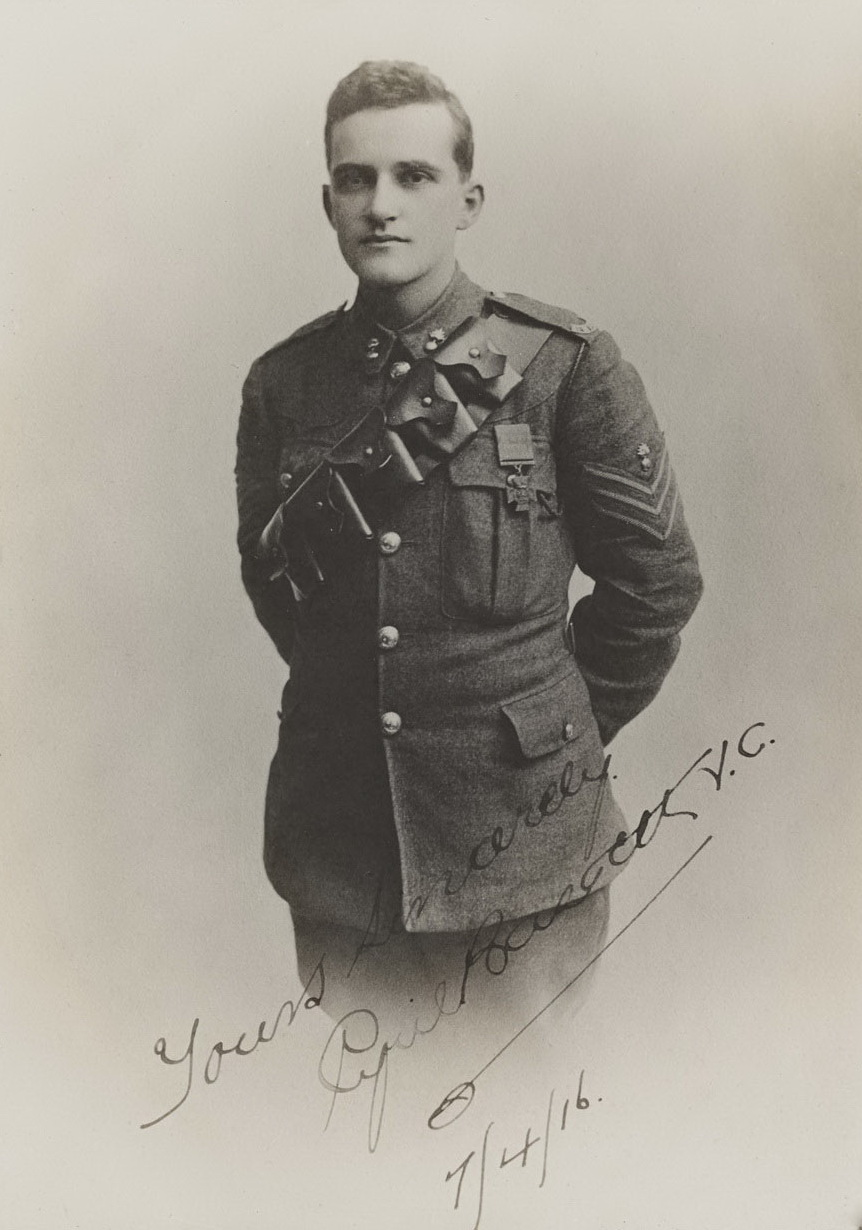
- Cyril Bassett, April 1916
- Born: 3 January 1892; Mount Eden, Auckland, Colony of New Zealand
- Died: 9 January 1983 (aged 91); Stanley Bay, New Zealand
- Military career
- Allegiance: New Zealand
- Branch: New Zealand Military Forces
- Service years: 1909–29; 1941–43
- Rank: Lieutenant-Colonel
- Conflicts: First World War; Gallipoli Campaign; Battle of Chunuk Bair; Western Front; Battle of the Somme; German spring offensive (WIA); Second World War; Home Front
- Awards: Victoria Cross

Cyril Royston Guyton Bassett, VC (3 January 1892 – 9 January 1983) was a New Zealand recipient of the Victoria Cross (VC), the highest award for gallantry "in the face of the enemy" that could be awarded to British and Empire forces at the time. He was the only soldier serving with the New Zealand Expeditionary Force (NZEF) to be awarded the VC in the Gallipoli Campaign of the First World War.

Born in Auckland, Bassett was a bank worker when the First World War began. A member of New Zealand's Territorial Force, he volunteered for service abroad with NZEF and was posted to the New Zealand Divisional Signal Company as a sapper. He saw action on the opening day of the Gallipoli Campaign, and during the Battle of Chunuk Bair he performed the actions that led to his award of the VC. Medically evacuated due to sickness shortly after the battle, he later served on the Western Front and finished the war as a second lieutenant. Bassett returned to the banking profession but was recalled to active duty during the Second World War. He served on the Home Front and by the time he was taken off active duty in December 1943, he had been promoted to the rank of lieutenant colonel and was commander of signals in the Northern Military District. When he retired from his banking career he became a justice of the peace in Devonport. He died in 1983 at the age of 91.

== Early life ==
Cyril Royston Guyton Bassett was born on 3 January 1892 in the Auckland suburb of Mount Eden, to a printer, Frederick Bassett, and his wife Harriet, née Powley. Bassett attended Auckland Grammar School and then Auckland Technical College. After completing his formal education in 1908, he worked as a clerk for the National Bank of New Zealand. In 1909, he joined what later became the Territorial Force, the part-time military reserve, and was posted to the Auckland College Rifles. Two years later he transferred to the Auckland Divisional Signal Company.

== First World War ==
When the First World War broke out in the summer of 1914, it was Bassett's intention to join the Royal Navy, but his mother, whose family had a history of service in the British Army, convinced him to enlist in the New Zealand Military Forces. Bassett was not particularly tall and was initially rejected on the grounds of height. He persisted with his attempt to enlist, and joined the New Zealand Expeditionary Force (NZEF) as a sapper in the Corps of New Zealand Engineers, assigned to the New Zealand Divisional Signal Company.

=== Gallipoli ===
Bassett embarked with the main body of the NZEF for the Middle East in October 1914. Initially based in Egypt, after a period of training, he landed at ANZAC Cove on 25 April 1915, the opening day of the Gallipoli campaign. Along with the other signallers of his unit, he was immediately set to work laying communication lines to the headquarters of the New Zealand and Australian Division. In early May, he, along with two other signallers, was noted in consideration for a gallantry award for their efforts in laying telephone wires while under heavy fire.

Later in the campaign, Bassett was promoted to corporal. In August 1915, a series of offensives against Turkish positions along the Gallipoli front was planned to break the stalemate that had developed since the initial landing. On 7 August, the New Zealand Infantry Brigade attacked Chunuk Bair, a prominent hill overlooking the battlefield. The battle lasted for three days. Chunuk Bair was captured by the brigade's Wellington Infantry Battalion on the second day, during which Bassett, in command of a section of five other signallers of his unit, laid down and maintained telephone lines between brigade headquarters and the front lines. Working on the exposed slopes leading up to Chunuk Bair, he braved continuous gunfire during this time armed with only a revolver and a bayonet. A bullet struck his boot and two more passed through the fabric of his tunic during the fighting, but he was not wounded.

After the battle, Basset's name, along with those of the other five signallers of his section, was collected by Major Arthur Temperley of brigade headquarters, who nominated Bassett to receive the Victoria Cross (VC). A few days later, Bassett was evacuated from Gallipoli due to poor health. Suffering from dysentery, he spent several months recuperating at a hospital in Leicester and it was here that he was advised of his VC award. Instituted in 1856, the VC is the highest gallantry award that can be bestowed on a soldier of the British Empire. The citation read:

No. 4/515 Corporal Cyril Royston Guyton Bassett, New Zealand Divisional Signal Company. For most conspicuous bravery and devotion to duty on the Chunuk Bair ridge in the Gallipoli Peninsula on 7th August, 1915. After the New Zealand Infantry Brigade had attacked and established itself on the ridge, Corporal Bassett, in full daylight and under a continuous and heavy fire, succeeded in laying a telephone line from the old position to the new one on Chunuk Bair. He has subsequently been brought to notice for further excellent and most gallant work connected with the repair of telephone lines by day and night under heavy fire.

— The London Gazette, No. 29328, 15 October 1915

The citation incorrectly refers to Bassett's actions on 7 August; it was not until the following day that the Wellington Infantry Battalion captured Chunuk Bair. His VC was the first to be awarded to a soldier of the NZEF and he was the only one to receive it for actions during the Gallipoli Campaign. King George V presented him the VC at an investiture held at Buckingham Palace on 3 February 1916. Bassett later remarked of the VC action, "I reckon there must be some guardian angel looking after me, especially as one man was shot dead in front of me and another wounded just behind."

=== Western Front ===
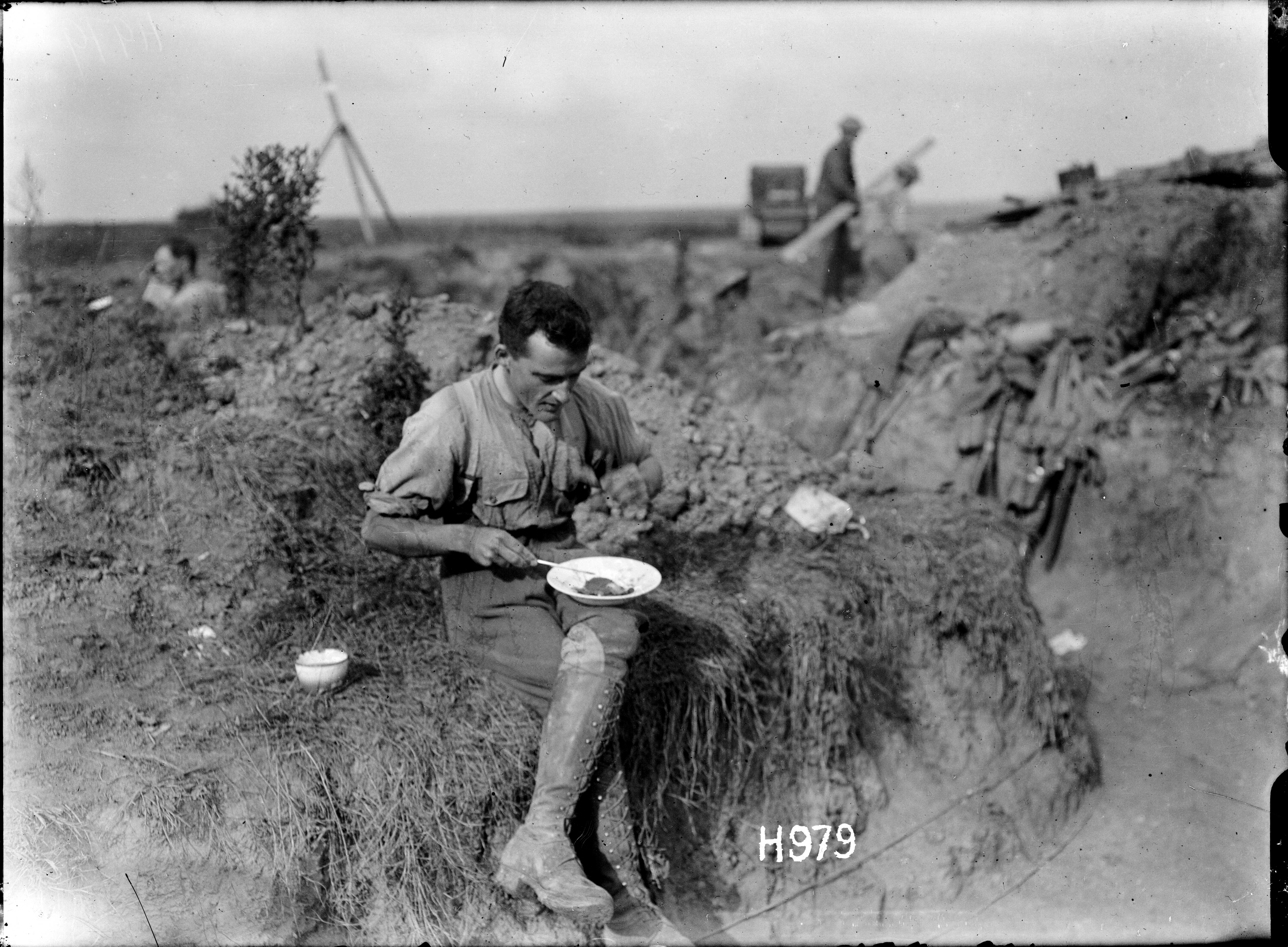
Sergeant Cyril Royston Guyton Bassett eating a meal in the trenches, 1917.

In June 1916, Bassett rejoined his unit, by then on the Western Front in France as part of the New Zealand Division. Later that year, he participated in the Battle of the Somme, and in 1917 was commissioned as a second lieutenant. He was wounded twice while on the Western Front; the first occasion was in October 1917, and the second was during the German spring offensive in March 1918, when an artillery barrage destroyed the headquarters of the New Zealand Rifle Brigade, where he was the signals officer. The same barrage killed the brigade's commander, Brigadier-General Harry Fulton. On extracting himself from the rubble of the headquarters, Bassett immediately set about reestablishing communications for which he was recommended for, but was not awarded, the Military Cross. With the war now over, he returned to New Zealand in late 1918 as the New Zealand Division started demobilising and was formally discharged from the NZEF in 1919.

== Interwar period and Second World War ==
Bassett returned to his banking career after the war, managing branches of the National Bank in Auckland and later in Paeroa. He retained a link to the military, rejoining the Territorial Force shortly after his discharge from the NZEF but was placed on the retired list of officers in 1929. Three years previously, he had married Ruth Louise Grant in St David's Church, Auckland; the couple had two children. By 1939 he was the manager of the Auckland Town Hall branch of the National Bank.

Called up for the National Military Reserve as a result of the outbreak of the Second World War, Bassett was placed on active duty in 1941 as a captain in the Royal New Zealand Corps of Signals (RNZSigs). He was not required to serve overseas and instead he worked in signals on the Home Front in New Zealand. Promoted to major in February 1942, his active war service ended in December 1943. By then he had achieved the rank of lieutenant colonel, and was commander of signals in the Northern Military District.

== Later life and legacy ==
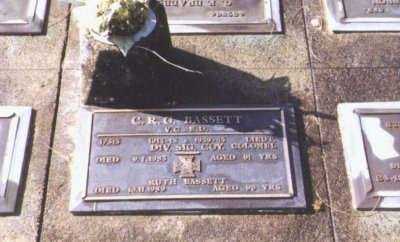
Bassett's grave in the cemetery at North Shore Memorial Park

Bassett returned to the National Military Reserve from which he retired in 1948. As a civilian, he resumed his banking profession. He retired in 1952 but remained active in the community of Devonport, on Auckland's North Shore, as a justice of the peace. In 1953, he was awarded the Queen Elizabeth II Coronation Medal. He died at Stanley Bay, in Auckland, on 9 January 1983, shortly after his 91st birthday; his ashes were buried at North Shore Memorial Park. He was survived by his wife Ruth and their two daughters. His VC, gifted to the RNZSigs upon his death, is displayed at the Auckland War Memorial Museum. Several years earlier, Bassett had planted a pine tree, reportedly cultivated from a seedling taken from the area of the Battle of Lone Pine at Gallipoli, in front of the museum as part of an Anzac Day service.

According to his daughter, Bassett rarely spoke about his achievements, and she did not learn of her father's award until she studied Gallipoli at primary school. He was modest and expressed embarrassment at being the only New Zealand VC recipient of the Gallipoli Campaign. He commented that "when I got my medal I was disappointed to find I was the only New Zealander to get one at Gallipoli, because hundreds of Victoria Crosses should have been awarded there."

Bassett remains the only New Zealand signaller to have been awarded the VC and was a lifetime member of the Corps of Signals Association. In recognition of Bassett's rank at the time of his award, the Bassett Memorial Trophy is awarded annually to the most outstanding corporal in the RNZSigs. The trophy is a statue of Bassett on Chunuk Bair. An annual speech competition, run by the Royal New Zealand Returned and Services' Association and sponsored by the ANZ Bank, formerly the National Bank, for secondary school students is named for him. The winner travels to Gallipoli to attend the ANZAC Day commemorations.
