= Emily Perkins (novelist) =

New Zealand author (born 1970)

Emily Perkins MNZM
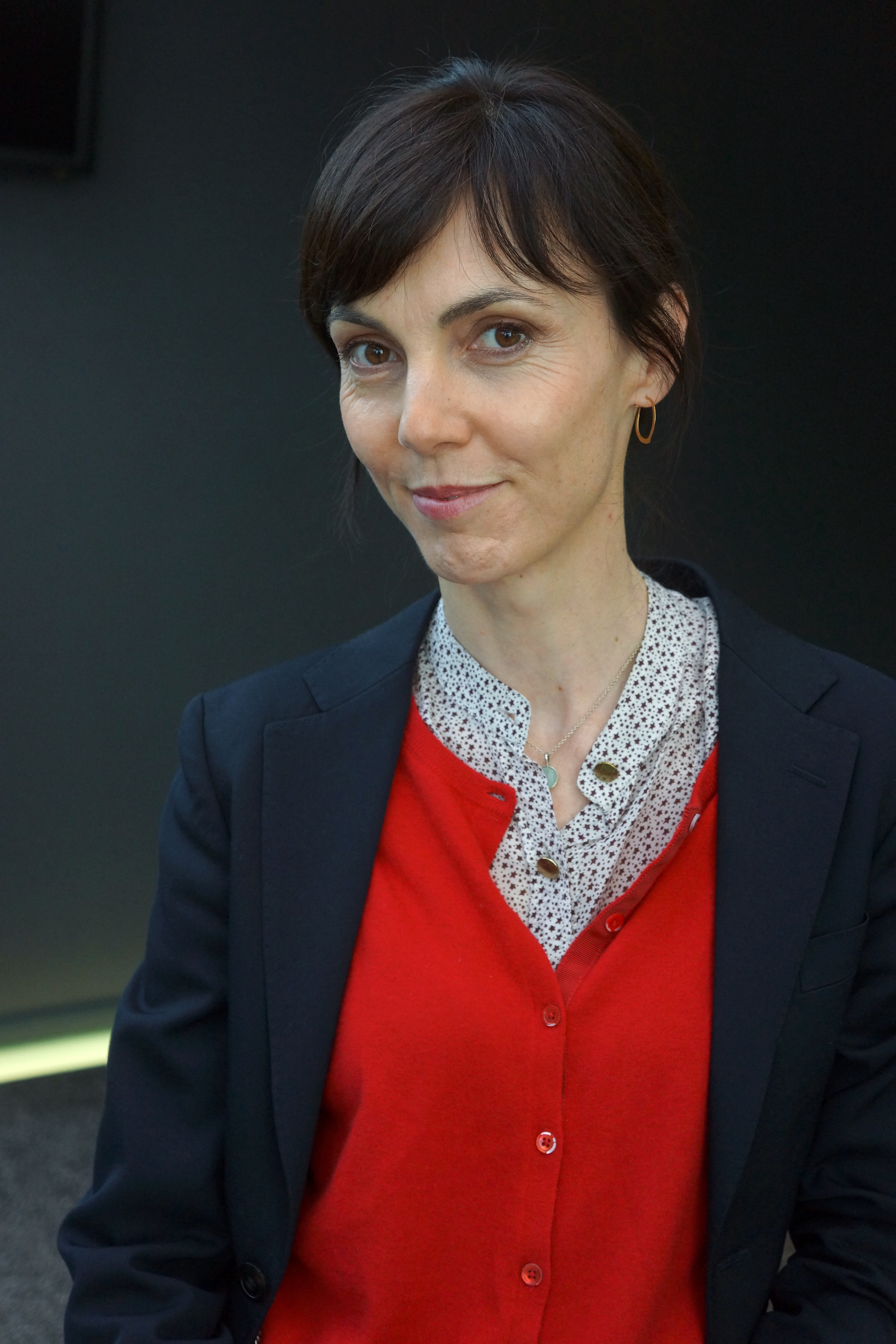
- Perkins in October 2012
- Born: Emily Justine Perkins; 1970 (age 55–56); Christchurch, New Zealand
- Education: University of Auckland (MCW)
- Occupations: Novelist; short story writer; playwright; university lecturer
- Spouse: Karl Maughan
- Children: 3
- Writing career
- Notable awards: Arts Foundation of New Zealand Laureate Award (2011)
- Website: emilyperkinsauthor.com

Emily Justine Perkins MNZM (born 1970) is a New Zealand novelist, short story writer, playwright and university lecturer. Over the course of her career Perkins has written five novels, one collection of short stories and two plays. She has won a number of notable literary awards, including twice winning the top award for fiction at the New Zealand Book Awards (in 2009 and 2023). In 2011 she received an Arts Foundation of New Zealand Laureate Award.

== Early life, education and family ==
Perkins was born in Christchurch in 1970, and grew up in Auckland and Wellington. She worked as a television actor as a teenager, playing the character Fran in the 1980s New Zealand television series Open House. She graduated from Toi Whakaari with a diploma in acting in 1989, but decided to quit acting a few years later after being unable to find suitable work.

In 1993, after quitting acting, Perkins studied writing under Bill Manhire at Victoria University. She did not complete a degree at that time, but later completed a master's degree in creative writing at the University of Auckland. She moved to London in the mid-1990s after studying at Victoria, where she married Karl Maughan and had three children.

== Career ==
=== Not Her Real Name to The Forrests: 1996-2012 ===
Perkins' first collection of stories, Not Her Real Name and Other Stories, was published in 1996 by Picador while she was living in London and working in a junior role at Bloomsbury Publishing. She had been introduced to a contact at Picador by Fergus Barrowman, the publisher of Sport magazine which had featured Perkins' first published short story. Not Her Real Name was shortlisted for the New Zealand Book Award and won the Best First Book (Fiction) Award. Subsequently, it also won the Geoffrey Faber Memorial Prize.

Her first novel Leave Before You Go was published in 1998 by Picador. It was followed by The New Girl (Picador, 2001), which was shortlisted for the John Llewellyn Rhys Prize. Perkins and her family returned to New Zealand and moved to Auckland in 2005, where she was employed as a senior writing tutor at the University of Auckland and Auckland University of Technology. In 2006 she received the Buddle Findlay Sargeson Fellowship. Perkins presented a television series about books called The Book Show from 2006 to 2007, followed by The Good Word from 2009 to 2012.

Perkins' third novel, Novel About My Wife (Bloomsbury Publishing, 2008), won the 2009 Montana Book Award for Fiction and the Believer Book Award. Carrie O'Grady, reviewing the book for The Guardian commented that Perkins "writes brilliantly about dismal people", and described it as an "accomplished, clever, rather sad book". Kirkus Reviews described it as "not perfect, but pungently observed, suspenseful and often funny".

In 2011 Perkins received an Arts Foundation of New Zealand Laureate Award. In 2012 her fourth novel, The Forrests, was published by Bloomsbury. It was tipped by the Hay Festival to win the 2012 Man Booker Prize, but failed to reach the longlist. It was shortlisted for the best book of fiction in the 2013 New Zealand Post Book Awards and longlisted for the Women's Prize for Fiction.

=== Playwrighting, Lioness: 2013–present ===
In 2013 Perkins became a senior lecturer at the International Institute of Modern Letters (part of Victoria University in Wellington). In 2015 she was commissioned by the Auckland Theatre Company to write an adaptation of A Doll's House by Henrik Ibsen, which was performed at the Maidment Theatre. In 2016 she co-wrote the film The Rehearsal with Alison Maclean.

Perkins was appointed a Member of the New Zealand Order of Merit in the 2017 Queen's Birthday Honours, for services to literature. In 2022 she wrote the original play The Made for the Auckland Theatre Company, performed at the ASB Waterfront Theatre. A review in The New Zealand Herald noted that Perkins is best-known as a novelist but the play "shows she's a brilliant playwright, too", having created "a provocative script packed with wry observations, an unexpected twist or two and all-too-familiar characters and situations".

She won the Jann Medlicott Acorn Prize for Fiction (with $65,000 in prize money) at the 2024 Ockham New Zealand Book Awards for her novel Lioness (2023), about the life of a middle-aged woman married to a wealthy property developer. The judges commented: "Disturbing, deep, smart, and funny as hell, Lioness is unforgettable". Lioness was longlisted for the International Dublin Literary Award in 2025.

Lioness was selected by Steve Braunias as the 2023 Newsroom book of the year, who said it "has the exact feel of New Zealand life as lived by the wealthy, accumulating their total fucking crap and generally having a really good time". Clare Mabey, reviewing for The Spinoff, described it as "masterful in the way it confronts the concept of choice, both big and small".

== Publications ==
- Perkins, Emily (1997). Not Her Real Name and Other Stories. Picador. ISBN 978-0330342667.
- — (1998). Leave Before You Go. Picador. ISBN 978-0330353076.
- — (2002). The New Girl. Picador. ISBN 978-0330376013.
- — (2008). Novel About My Wife. Bloomsbury Publishing. ISBN 1596911662.
- — (2012). The Forrests. Bloomsbury Publishing. ISBN 978-1608196777.
- — (2023). Lioness. Bloomsbury Publishing. ISBN 978-1526660671.
