= John Walsh (artist) =

New Zealand painter (born 1954)

John Walsh is a painter who was born in 1954 in Tolaga Bay, New Zealand. He is of Te Aitanga-a-Hauiti/ New Zealand Irish descent. Although he attended Ilam School of Fine Arts in Christchurch between 1973 and 1974, he is largely a self-taught artist. He now lives and works in Wellington, New Zealand.

== His work ==
Although John Walsh started painting later in life, he has managed to create a name for himself on the New Zealand art scene. His first solo exhibition was the result of his appointment of curator at the National Art Gallery in Wellington (now known as the Museum of New Zealand Te Papa Tongarewa). Since then, he continues to exhibit regularly in different galleries around New Zealand and has also had the opportunity to show his work abroad in Sydney, Australia and Noumea, New Caledonia.

John Walsh started with figurative imagery, portraying people he knew around the East Coast region. His otherworldly landscapes and figures would take another few years before emerging as a constant in his paintings. In the meantime, Walsh was invited to participatein the no-longer-extant six storey Pathfinder mural, on the side of a socialist publishing house in New York in 1989, then moved on to work in a number of different institutions.

It was when Walsh was invited to work as a curator in Wellington that he developed a theme for his paintings. Walsh works on medium to large scale boards achieving textural effects through scratches and expressive gestural brushwork. His work evokes mythical creatures and vistas which eludes the concept of a specific location and time.

Works in the 2012 exhibition I Can't Stop Loving You held at Gow Langsford Gallery retained the style of his earlier works while also demonstrating a new direction in the artist's career. While a sense of the ethereal remains through the use of similar hues and tones, the artist's interest shifts towards grand vistas rather than focussing on the mythical figures. However, one expects to see his otherworldly figures appear in the landscape at any given time.

== Selected Public Collections ==
- University of Waikato, Hamilton
- Te Papa Tongarewa - Museum of New Zealand, Wellington
- Sarjeant Gallery, Wanganui
- Gisborne Museum and Arts Centre, Gisborne
- Jean Marie Tjibaou Cultural Centre, Noumea, New Caledonia

== Selected bibliography ==
- Adsett, Sandi, Cliff Whiting and Witi Ihimaera. Mataora. David Bateman Ltd, 1996.
- Beatson, Peter and Dianne Beatson. The Arts in Aotearoa New Zealand, 1994.
- Caughey, Elizabeth and John Gow. Contemporary New Zealand Art 4. David Bateman Ltd, 2005.
- Gundry Sheridan. ‘Pathfinder Painter,’ North and South, July 1997.
- Hohaia, Te Miringa, Gregory O’Brien and Lara Strongman. Parihaka: the Art of Passive Resistance. Published for exhibition at City Gallery Wellington/Parihaka Pa Trustees/Victoria University Press, Wellington, 2000.
- Ihimaera, Witi and Ngarino Ellis. Te Ata: Maori Art from the East Coast. Reed Publishing, Auckland, 2002.
- Te Maunga Taranaki: Views of a Mountain, exhibition catalogue, Govett-Brewster Art Gallery Publications, 2001.
- Walsh, John. Nanny Mango. Te Papa Press, 2000.
