= Sara Hughes (artist) =

New Zealand–Canadian painter (born 1971)

- Born: 1971 (age 54–55); Vancouver, British Columbia, Canada
- Education: Elam School of Fine Arts

Sara Hughes (born 1971) is a Canadian-born New Zealand artist.

== Background ==
Hughes was born in 1971 in Vancouver, British Columbia, Canada. She graduated in 2001 from the Elam School of Fine Arts with a Masters of Fine Arts.

== Career ==
Hughes is a painter and installation artist.

Hughes is represented in Auckland by Gow Langsford Gallery and in Melbourne by Sutton Gallery.

Work by Hughes are included in some of public collections including the Auckland Art Gallery Toi o Tāmaki, Museum of New Zealand Te Papa Tongarewa, and the National Gallery of Australia.

A 2015 work, Transit Cloud, created in collaboration with Gregor Kregar and Davor Popadich (artist) was installed in the alleyway between McCrae Way and Totara Avenue, New Lynn as part of the New Lynn transformation project. The sculpture is part of the Auckland City Art Collection. It attracted public controversy after critics said it looked like a giant penis.

In 2023 she was commissioned to create art works called Colour Quartet to be sold to raise funds for the restoration of Kāhui St David's a music centre in Khyber Pass Rd, Auckland.

== Residencies ==
- 2008/09 Creative New Zealand Berlin Visual Artists Residency
- 2008 Artist-in-Residence at the McColl Center for Art + Innovation in Charlotte, NC

== Awards ==
- 2005 Wallace Arts Trust paramount award
- 2005 Norsewear Art Award
- 2003 Frances Hodgkins Fellowship
