= Pah Homestead =

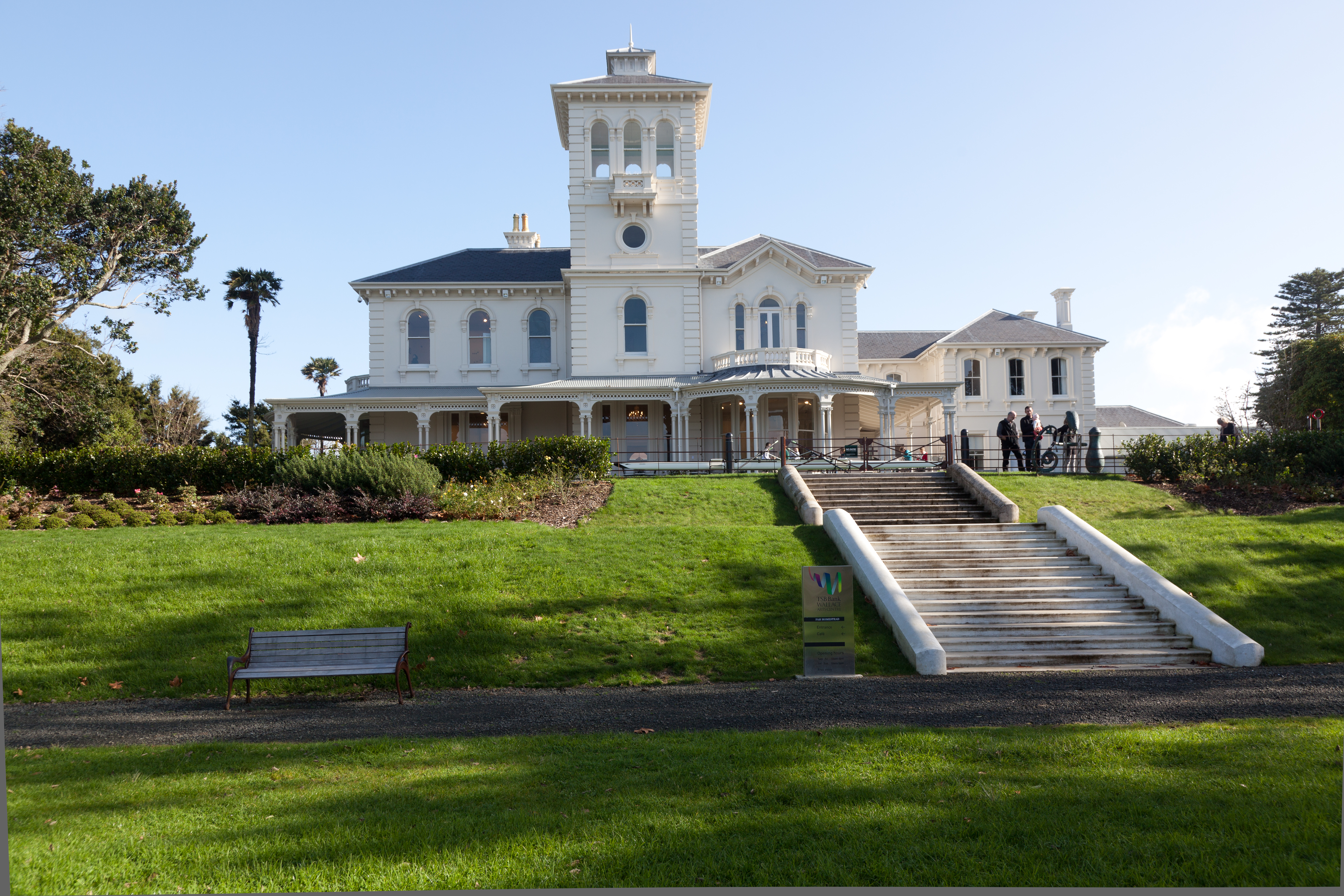
- Pah Homestead in 2011
- Interactive map of the Pah Homestead area
- Former names: Monte Cecilia; Monte Cecilia Convent; Pah Farm; The Pah

General information
- Type: Homestead
- Location: Monte Cecilia Park, Hillsborough Road, Hillsborough, Auckland, New Zealand
- Coordinates: 36°54′52″S 174°45′48″E
- Completed: 1880
- Owner: Auckland Council

Heritage New Zealand – Category 1
- Designated: 1 September 1983
- Reference no.: 89

References
- "The Pah". New Zealand Heritage List/Rārangi Kōrero. Heritage New Zealand.

The Pah Homestead is a historic building located in the suburb of Hillsborough in Auckland, New Zealand, within the bounds of Monte Cecilia Park. It is owned by the Auckland Council, and is currently used as an art gallery, housing the Arts House Trust (previously Wallace Arts Trust) collection of New Zealand art.

== History ==
The Homestead was built on a site which was originally a fortified Māori pā during the 17th and 18th centuries. The area was significant to Ngai Riukiuta, descendants of Tainui canoe. It is believed to have been occupied by Pōtatau Te Wherowhero between 1839 and 1844.

In 1844, the land was purchased by William Hart and used as a cattle and dairy farm, then in 1851 was sold to William Brown and John Logan Campbell.

In 1866 the farm was sold to Thomas Russell for £12,725. Russell was an active member of the Auckland Horticultural Society and added many interesting plants to the property including a Chilean wine palm (Jubaea chilensis), several bunya-bunya pines (Araucaria bidwillii) and a circular grove of holm oaks (Quercus ilex). In January 1872, Cyrus Haley, who had a grudge against Russell, attacked the home, firing shots into each of the bedrooms. No-one was hurt and Haley was later caught and convicted of attempted murder.

In 1877, Auckland businessman James Williamson purchased the property for £10,000. Williamson retained the name "The Pah" and demolished the thirty-year-old house to make way for a palatial "gentleman's residence". Built between 1877 and 1879, the Homestead was designed by Edward Mahoney, of E. Mahoney and Son, the house is an Italianate villa, constructed of brick rendered with cement to imitate stone. It was based on Queen Victoria and Prince Albert's Osborne House in the Isle of Wight and was the largest house in the Auckland province at the time and was widely noted as the finest.

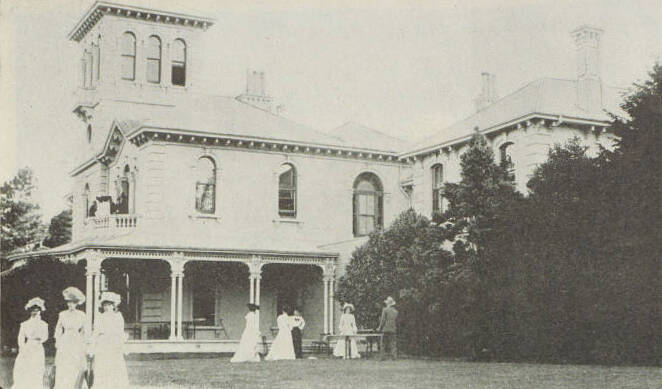
Women walking in the grounds of the Pah Mansion at a garden party to celebrate the new site of St John's College, 1902

The Pah featured verandahs, balconies and a central tower with a viewing room at the top to give a 360-degree view of the landscape. The house has views to One Tree Hill to the north, Mount Smart to the east and the Manukau Harbour to the south. The viewing room was equipped with a telescope. The main rooms are distinguished by high quality plaster ceilings, Italian marble fireplaces, parquet floors with inlaid borders and finely chased metal fixtures to the doors.

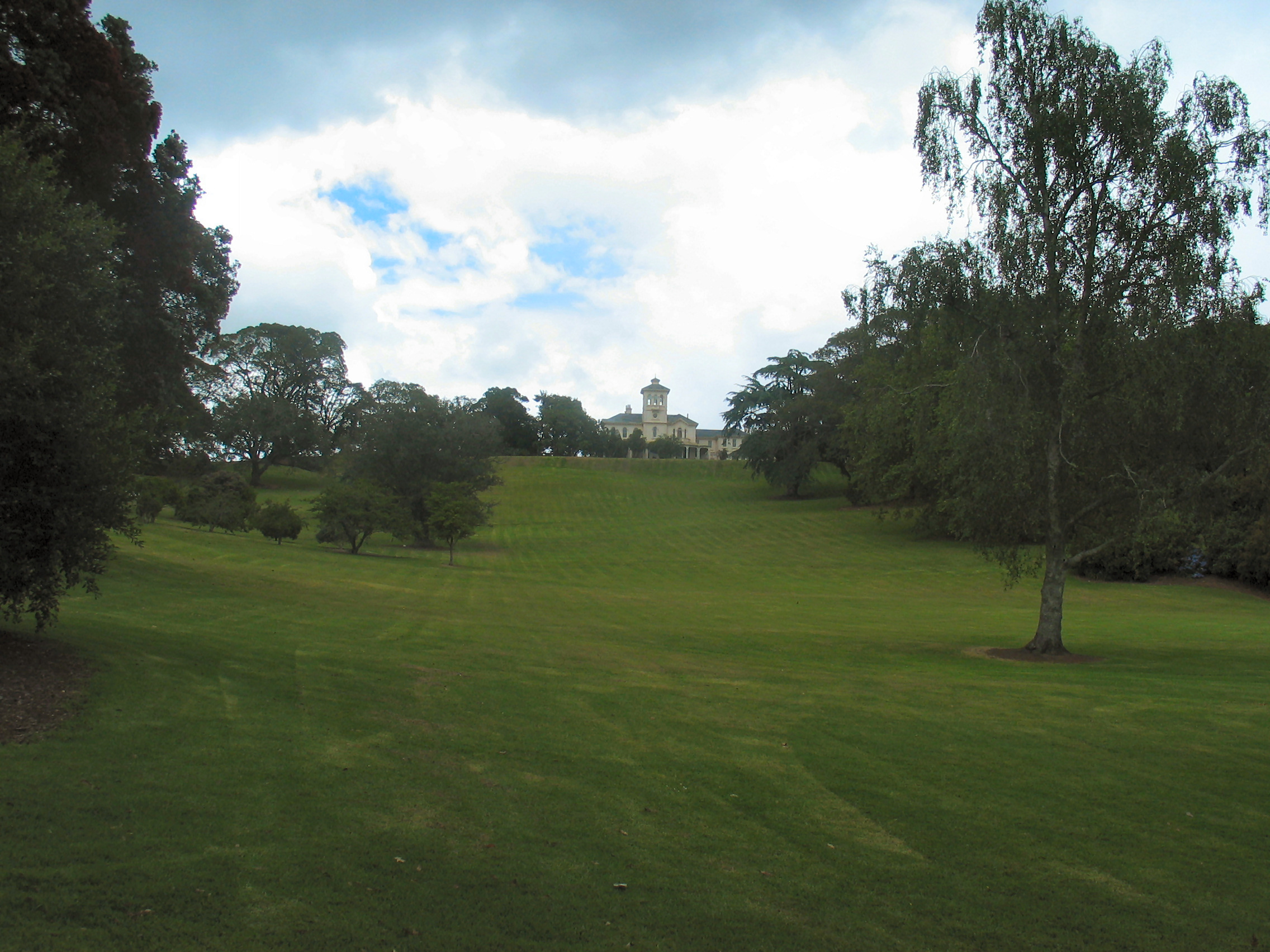
Monte Cecilia Park looking to Pah Homestead, 2006.

Williamson had dreamed of creating a family dynasty with this estate as its symbol, however following the stock market crash in 1886 Williamson was forced to sell this property, which was subsequently divided up for development. After Williamson's death in 1888, the lavish establishment was taken over by the Bank of New Zealand.

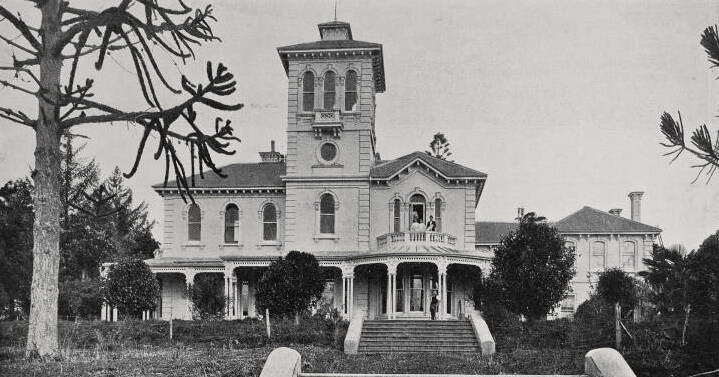
An exterior view of Pah 'College', 1913

On February 11 1902, St John's Collegiate School was opened at the Homestead which served as a day and boarding school for boys.

In 1913 the Pah was purchased by the Sisters of Mercy and renamed Monte Cecilia then later taken over by the Catholic Diocese. During this time, it served multiple purposes, as an Orphanage, Novitate home and temporary residence for the unhoused and new migrants.

== Restoration ==
On 1 September 1983, the building was registered by the New Zealand Historic Places Trust as a Category I heritage structure, with reference number 89.

In September 2002, Pah Homestead was purchased by the Auckland City Council as part of council plans to develop the surrounding estate into a premier park for the city, Monte Cecilia Park. The council developed a heritage conservation plan, an archaeological and geophysical assessment and a cultural heritage overview for Whataroa Pā. A landscape history and tree assessment were produced to help better understand the Māori and European heritage of the site.

The council upgraded the Pah Homestead roof as part of its commitment to protecting and preserving heritage buildings in Auckland city. The restoration involved weatherproofing, reinforcing the structure of the roof and some seismic upgrading. The council selected materials matching the original roof like English slate tiles and rolled lead.

Auckland City worked with other groups and organisations like New Zealand Historic Places Trust and specialist heritage architects Matthews & Matthews Architects Ltd. to ensure the renovation is of a high standard. These works were undertaken by NZ Strong Construction, an Auckland construction company specialising in unique projects such as this.

One of the galleries in the Pah Homestead, 2013

== The Arts House Trust ==
In August 2010, Pah Homestead opened as a gallery called the TSB Bank Wallace Arts Centre, housing the Wallace Arts Trust's collection of New Zealand art. In 2021, the James Wallace Arts Trust was reestablished as a new charitable entity and disassociated itself from James Wallace.

The now named, The Arts House Trust, promotes contemporary New Zealand art and artists. The gallery hosts free programmes and exhibitions and houses a large collection of over 9,500 works.

== Television and film ==
Over the years the house and its grounds have been used as the shooting locations in a number of television and film productions, such as:

- The Quiet Earth (1985)
- Gloss (1987)
- Lucy (2003)
- Ike: Countdown to D-Day (2004)
- The Chronicles of Narnia: The Lion, the Witch and the Wardrobe (2005)
- The Luminaires (2020)
