= Whaiwhakaaoroaro =

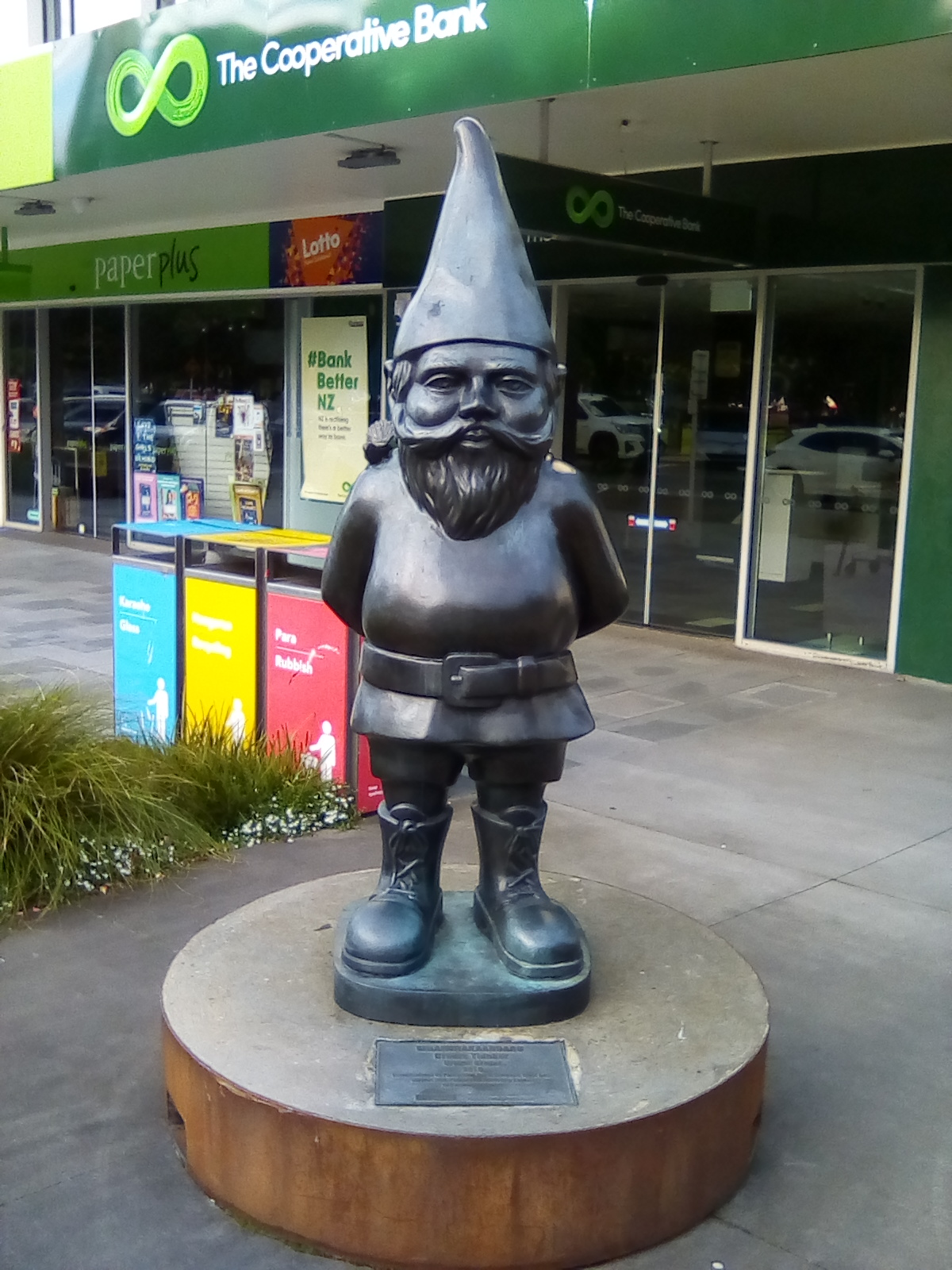
- Interactive map of Whaiwhakaaoroaro
- Location: Palmerston North, New Zealand
- Coordinates: 40°21′24″S 175°36′47″E
- Designer: Gregor Kregar
- Material: Bronze
- Opening date: 2020

Whaiwhakaaoroaro ("deep thinker") is a bronze sculpture of a gnome by Gregor Kregar, located in The Square in Palmerston North, New Zealand.

The statue depicts a garden gnome, with a pīwakawaka on its right shoulder and a Hochstetter's frog resting on one hand. It is 2.5 metres high and weighs 700 kg. A planned unveiling in April 2020 was disrupted by the COVID-19 pandemic, and it was not unveiled until August 2020. Originally located on the corner of Broadway and The Square, it has been relocated around the Palmerston North CBD several times. As of 2026 it is located at the southeast corner of The Square, on the intersection with Church Street.
