= Thomas Russell (New Zealand politician) =

New Zealand politician (1830–1904)

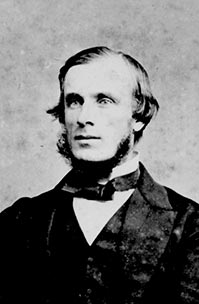
Russell (year unknown)

Thomas Russell CMG (c. 1830 – 2 September 1904) was a lawyer, politician, businessman and entrepreneur in 19th-century New Zealand. Russell was one of the first two New Zealand-trained lawyers admitted to the bar. He was the founder of a number of major New Zealand-based companies including the Bank of New Zealand and the New Zealand Insurance Co. He served as Minister of Colonial Defence during the New Zealand Wars.

== Early life ==
Russell was born in County Cork, Ireland, probably in 1830. His parents were Thomas Flower Russell (c. 1808–1873) and Mary Roberts (c. 1811–1847). The family emigrated to Australia as steerage passengers in 1833, and settled in Maitland, New South Wales, where his father farmed. In 1840 the family moved on to New Zealand, living in Kororakea at first, then Auckland where his father worked as a builder. From 1844 Thomas Russell was articled to the lawyer Thomas Outhwaite and on 4 November 1851 was admitted as a solicitor on the roll of the Supreme Court of New Zealand. He became Outhwaite's partner and later took over his practice.

On 18 July 1854, Russell married Emeline Vercoe, third daughter of Henry Vercoe JP, at Tautauroa, near Otahuhu.

== Politics ==
New Zealand Parliament
Years	Term	Electorate	Party
1861–1866	3rd	Auckland City East	Independent

Russell was elected as MP for Auckland City East in 1861, holding the electorate until his retirement from politics in 1866. He became a cabinet minister under Alfred Domett in August 1862, and was Minister of Defence in the administration led by Frederick Whitaker and William Fox in 1863–1864. During this time the New Zealand Settlements Act (1863) was passed, facilitating the confiscation of Māori-owned land.

Russell was appointed a Companion of the Order of St Michael and St George in 1877.

== After politics ==
In 1866 he bought the Pah farm in present-day Hillsborough. In January 1872, Cyrus Haley, who had a grudge against Russell, attacked the home (later replaced by the Pah Homestead), firing shots into each of the bedrooms. No-one was hurt and Haley was later caught and convicted of attempted murder.

In 1997, Russell was posthumously inducted into the New Zealand Business Hall of Fame.
