= Max Gimblett =

New Zealand artist (born 1935)

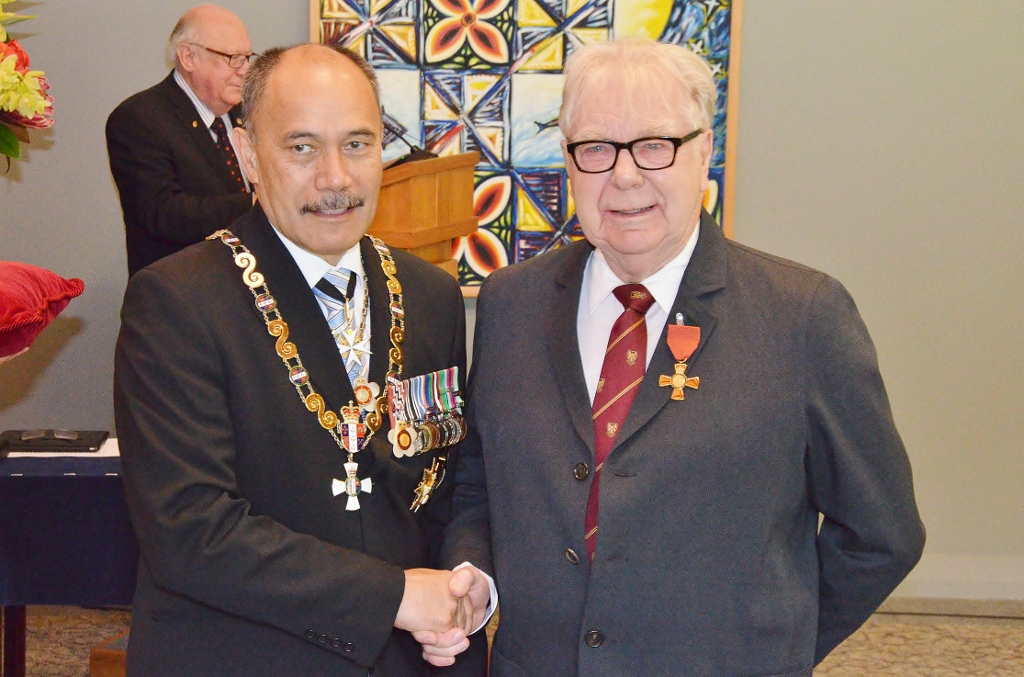
Gimblett (right) in 2015, after his investiture as an Officer of the New Zealand Order of Merit by the governor-general, Sir Jerry Mateparae

Maxwell Harold Gimblett ONZM (born 5 December 1935) is a New Zealand and American artist. His work synthesizes postwar American and Japanese art using abstract expressionism, modernism, spiritual abstraction, and Zen calligraphy. Gimblett’s work was included in the exhibition The Third Mind: American Artists Contemplate Asia, 1869-1989 at the Guggenheim Museum and is represented in that museum's collection as well as the collections of the Museum of Modern Art, Whitney Museum of Art, National Gallery of Art (Washington, D.C.), San Francisco Museum of Modern Art, Museum of New Zealand Te Papa Tongarewa, and the Auckland Art Gallery Toi O Tamaki, among others. Throughout the year Gimblett leads sumi ink workshops all over the world. In 2006 he was appointed Inaugural Visiting Professor at the National Institute of Creative Arts and Industries, Auckland University. Gimblett has received honorary doctorates from Waikato University and the Auckland University of Technology and was awarded the Officer of the New Zealand Order of Merit (ONZM). He lives and works in New York and has returned to New Zealand over 65 times.

== Life and work ==
Gimblett was born and raised in Grafton, Auckland, New Zealand, a second-generation New Zealander.

Gimblett attended King's School and Auckland Grammar School, and from 1951-1953 studied at and received his Associate in New Zealand Institute of Management from the Seddon Memorial College. Gimblett left New Zealand in 1956 to travel throughout Europe until 1961, with a brief return to Auckland for a year in 1958–59. Traveling to the Americas in 1962, Gimblett apprenticed with master potter Roman Bartkiw in Toronto, Canada, and then worked with master ceramist Merton Chambers from 1962 to 1964. In 1964 he married Barbara Kirshenblatt, now the Ronald S. Lauder Chief Curator of the Core Exhibition at Polin Museum of the History of Polish Jews and University Professor Emirita at New York University. That same year he studied drawing at the Ontario College of Art, Toronto. It was in Toronto where Gimblett and Kirshenblatt were sitting together one night and Gimblett showed a conte crayon self portrait he had just completed to which Kirshenblatt declared, "you're a painter, Max!" and their fates were sealed.

The pair began traveling the states in 1965 as Kirshenblatt attended various schools. They lived in San Francisco where Kirshenblatt studied at University of California, Berkeley and Gimblett briefly studied at the San Francisco Art Institute. He had his first one person exhibition with Richard Capper, San Francisco, in 1966. From 1967 to 1970 Gimblett had a studio in Bloomington, Indiana where Barbara Kirshenblatt-Gimblett was completing her PhD in Folklore Studies. In 1970-1972 they lived in Austin, Texas, where Barbara was an associate professor in the English department at the University of Texas, Austin and Gimblett had an important one-person exhibition at Dave Hickey's legendary A Clean Well-Lighted Space.

In 1972 Gimblett and Kirshenblatt moved to New York—a place they would call home for the rest of their lives. In 1974 Gimblett formed an affinity and enduring friendship with the experimental filmmaker and kinetic sculptor Len Lye, a fellow New Zealander. Gimblett continued to support Lye's work after his death and in 1990 he became a trustee of the Len Lye Foundation based in New Plymouth, New Zealand.

In 1979 Gimblett and Kirshenblatt became American Citizens.

In 1975 he joined the Cuningham Ward Gallery, New York where he exhibited with Ross Bleckner, John Walker, David Reed, John Elderfield, and Lynton Wells. In 1989 he was awarded the National Endowment for the Arts Painting Fellowship. In 1990 Gimblett joined the Haines Gallery, San Francisco and the Gow Langsford Gallery, Auckland. Both of these galleries continue to represent him today. In 1991 he participated in a residency at The Rockefeller Foundation, Study and Conference Center, Bellagio, Lake Como, Italy. Gimblett was a J. Paul Getty associate at the Getty Center for the History of Art and the Humanities, Santa Monica, in 1991–1992.

Craig Potton Publishing published his first monograph in 2002 in association with Gow Langsford Gallery (Auckland), which includes essays by John Yau and Wystan Curnow.

"Max Gimblett: The Brush of All Things", a major survey of his work, opened at the Auckland Art Gallery Toi O Tamaki, Auckland, New Zealand in 2004 and traveled to the City Gallery, Wellington. Thomas McEvilley and Wystan Curnow contributed essays to the catalog, which also contained an interview with Barbara Kirshenblatt-Gimblett. "Here is how it happened. Gimblett stepped up to the 80-inch circular canvas and while that murderous train bore down on him, he painted The Wheel in less than one minute. This is no exaggeration, in on rapturous, fearless moment, which left him with time to spare." Wystan Curnow describes Gimblett painting The Wheel, an Enso, in his essay An Exhilaration of the Spirit, in Max Gimblett, monograph, 2002, published by Craig Potton Publishing in association with Gow Langsford Gallery, also including an essay by John Yau.

In January 2006 Max Gimblett took refuge in the precepts of Buddha, under the guidance of Dairyu Michael "Great Dragon" Wenger, at the San Francisco Zen Center.

"Gimblett’s absorption in Asian art connects him to three unique figures in American art: Morris Graves, John McLaughlin, and Ad Reinhardt," writes Yau, "One reason Gimblett shares a deep connection with these three seminal figures is because all of them embarked upon an intense and prolonged study of different schools of Buddhism and Buddhist art."

He was appointed to the honorary position of Visiting Professor of Art to the National Institute of Creative Arts and Industries, Auckland University, Auckland, New Zealand in 2003. Gimblett was the Laila Foundation Artist in Residence at HuiPress, Maui, HI in July 2008, making a suite of Enso etchings.

His work was included in the Guggenheim Museum's exhibition titled "The Third Mind: American Artists Contemplate Asia, 1860 to 1989" which was open from 30 January to 19 April 2009. The exhibition was curated by Alexandra Munroe, the museum's first Senior Curator of Asian Art.

For ANZAC's 100th Anniversary, he created the "Art of Remembrance" public art—solid brass quatrefoils to represent each Kiwi soldier that served in WW1, placed in a grid, as if armour, on the exterior of St. David's Church on Khyber Pass Road in Auckland, Gimblett's childhood church. The sales of individual Art of Remembrance quatrefoils raised $1 million towards saving and restoring the church. Quatrefoils from "Art of Remembrance" were installed at Te Papa and the Auckland War Memorial Museum.

He was named an Officer of the New Zealand Order of Merit for services to art in the 2015 Queen's Birthday Honours. On 26 October 2017, Gimblett received an honorary doctorate from the University of Waikato and again in 20for his philanthropy and achievements in the artistic world.

In 2022 The Getty Research Institute acquired an archive of more than 250 artist’s books as The Max Gimblett Artist's Book Collection.

Gimblett's work is rich and inventive. He is known for his great technical and stylistic range: the monochrome, geometric abstraction, the calligraphic and figurative expressionism all find a place in the work. He uses novel shaped supports: ovals, circles, and rings. However the quatrefoil is the shape he has really made his own. "The quatrefoil is defined ..." writes Thomas McEvilley, "as 'a compound leaf or flower consisting of four (usually rounded) leaflets or petals radiating from a common center.' Most of Gimblett’s works in this format are geometrised, meaning that the petals of the flowers are not merely rounded in an organic sense but are composed of four perfect circles that intersect at a single point. It is a format which virtually no other modern artist has emphasized."

Gimblett's work is highly affected by Buddhism, Christianity, classical mythology, alchemy, the writing of Carl Jung, Ernest Hemingway, William Saroyan, DH Lawrence, Dostoyevsky, and the poetry of TS Eliot, Charles Brasch, and Robert Creeley. He's influenced by fellow artists Len Lye, Jackson Pollock, William Turner, Henri Matisse, and Elizabeth Murray, and Zen ink painters Sengai Gibon, Yamaoka Tesshū, and Hakuin Ekaku. "The Influence of Zen," writes Thomas McEvilley, "for example, seems natural to Gimblett, and carries with it an echo of Asia’s proximity to New Zealand, but also can be traced partly to American artists with West Coast connections such as Clyfford Still and Mark Tobey. Gimblett has made a harmonious post-war synthesis of America and Japan."

Gimblett has collaborated with a number of other artists including Robert Creeley (The Dogs of Auckland), Lewis Hyde (Oxherding, numerous works on paper, paintings, and artist books), John Yau (artist books, works on paper, paintings), Alan Loney (Mondrian's Flowers), Chris Martin (works on paper), Michael Dai Ryu Wenger "Great Dragon" (works on paper, artist books), Matt Jones (works on paper, artist books paintings), Philip Luxton (ceramics), Giovanni Forlino (works on paper, artist books), Kristen Reyes (works on paper, artist books) and Perry Kirker-Mraz (works on paper, artist books, paintings).
