= Karl Maughan =

New Zealand artist (born 1964)

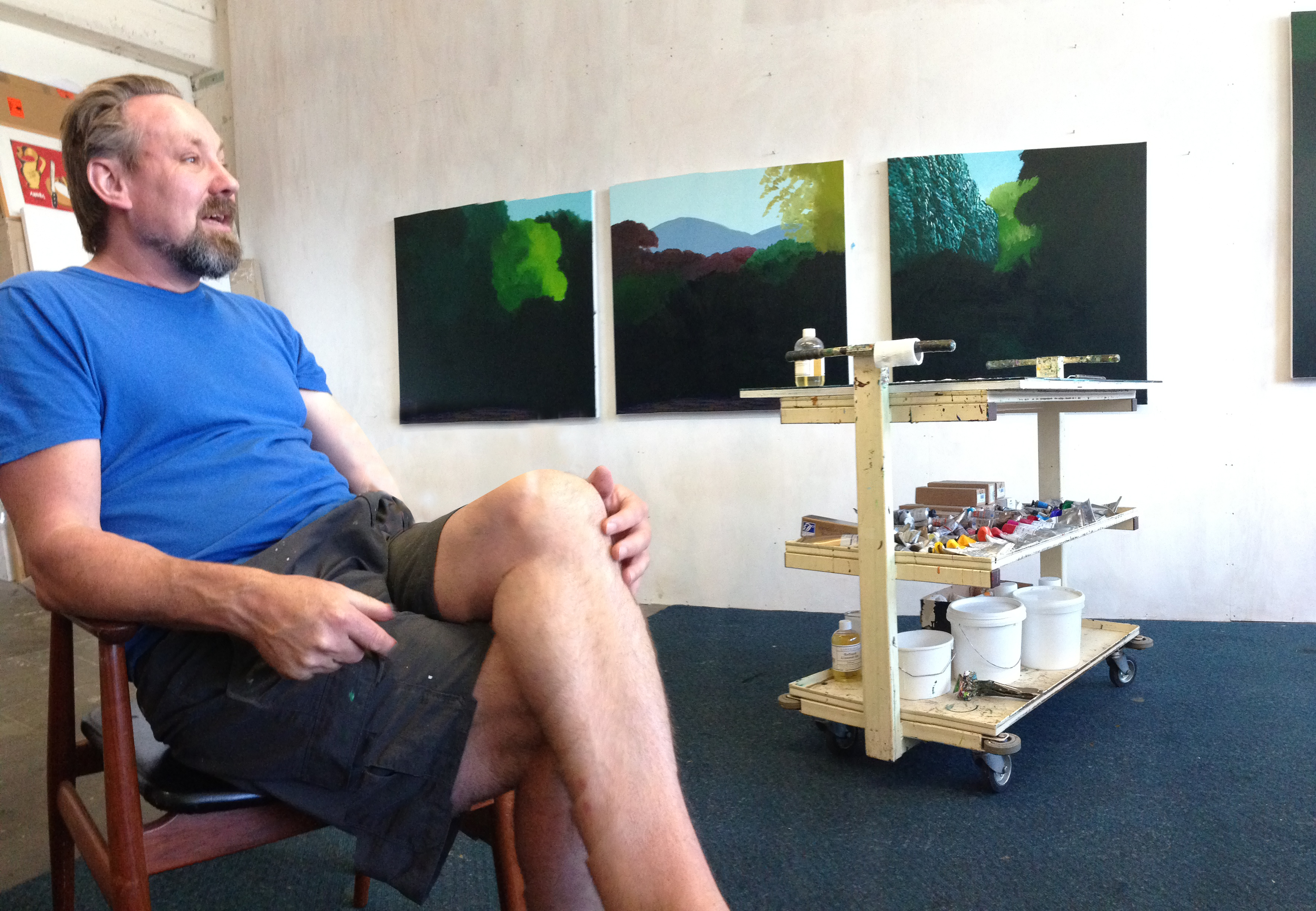
- Karl Maughan in his Wellington studio, 2013
- Born: 1964 (age 61–62); Wellington
- Education: Elam School of Fine Arts, University of Auckland

Karl Maughan (born 1964) is a New Zealand artist known for his oil paintings of gardens and floral scenery. His work is collected in New Zealand by Te Papa, the Christchurch Art Gallery and by the Wallace Arts Trust. Maughan is also featured in the British Arts Council Collection.

Maughan was born in Wellington, though grew up in the Manawatū. He studied at Elam School of Fine Arts in Auckland, where he finished a master's degree in 1987. Maughan currently lives in Wellington with his wife, Emily Perkins.
