= Monte Cecilia Park =

Park in Auckland, New Zealand

Monte Cecilia Park, Auckland
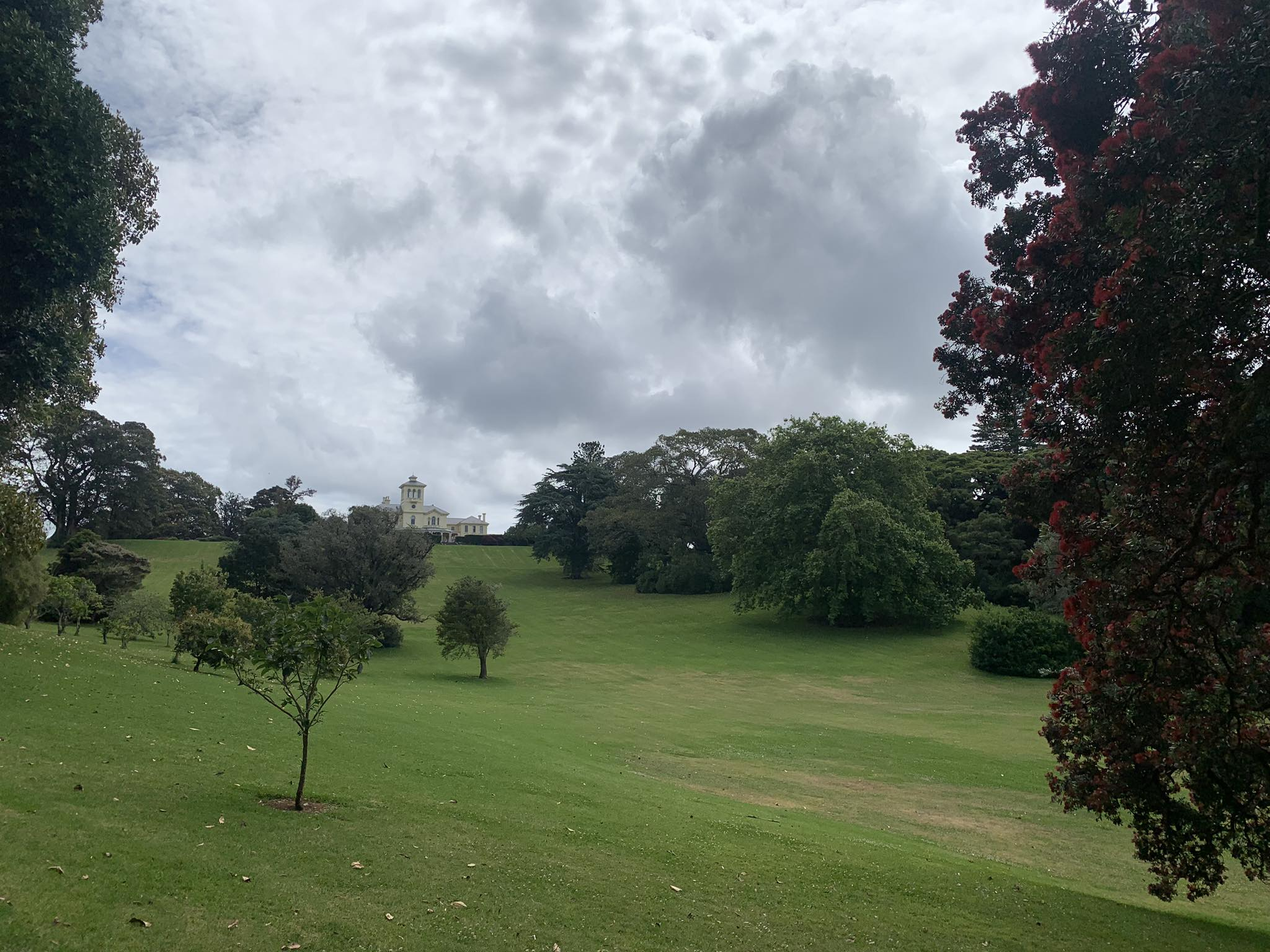
- Interactive map of Monte Cecilia Park, Auckland
- Type: Public park
- Location: Hillsborough, Auckland
- Coordinates: 36°54′50″S 174°45′50″E
- Operator: Auckland Council
- Status: Open year round

Monte Cecilia Park is located in the Auckland suburb of Hillsborough, close to its boundary with Royal Oak. The park's landscape showcases a diverse variety of mature exotic plants as well as native New Zealand flora.

== History ==
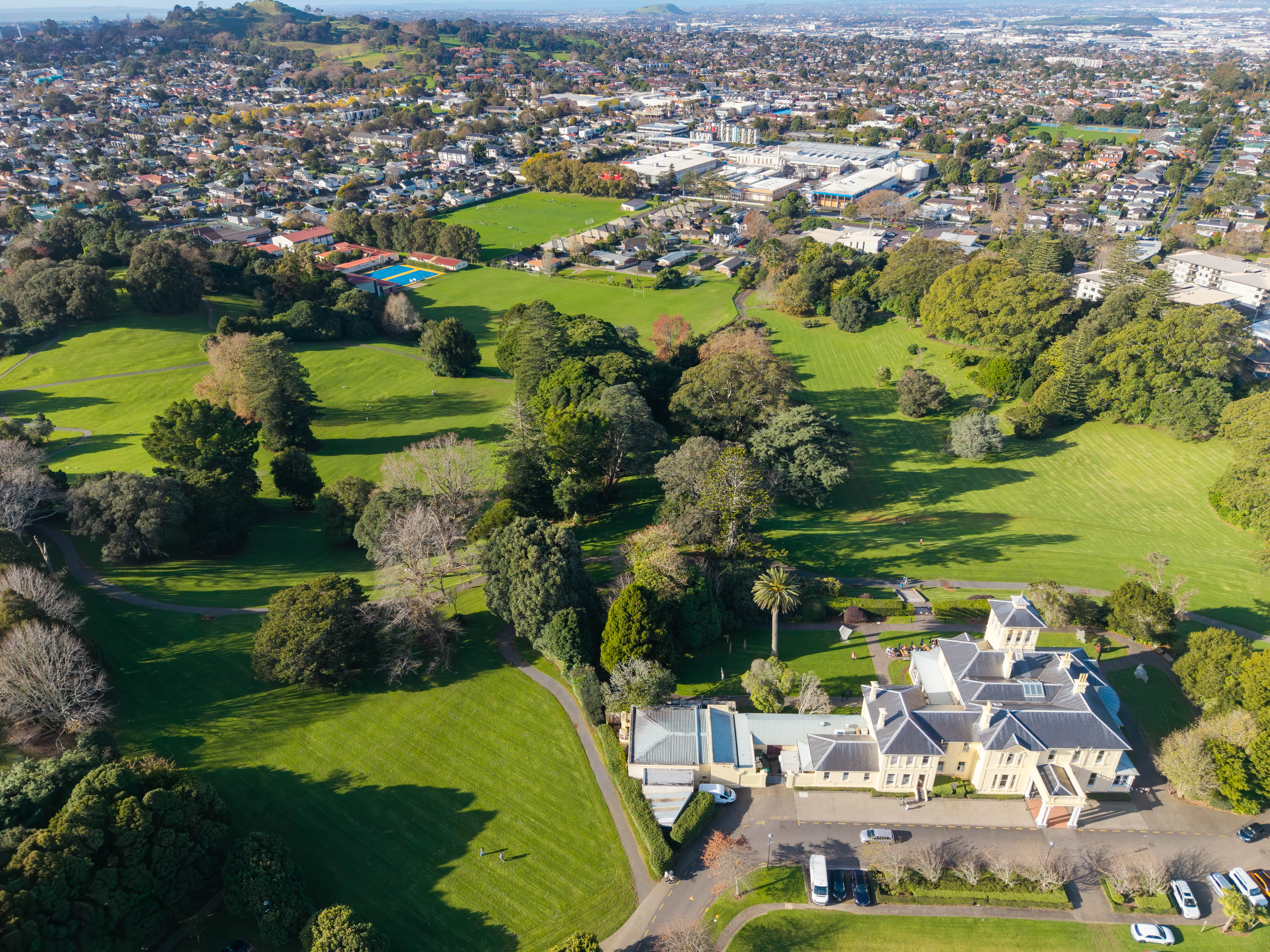
An aerial view of Monte Cecilia Park with Pah Homestead in the foreground

Monte Cecilia Park was once known as Whataroa Pā when occupied by Māori. In 1844 the land was sold by Māori to Europeans and new development began on the land. The area was purchased by William and Mary Hart as the Kohiraunui No 2 block, who developed a beef and dairy cattle-rearing farm on the site. This site was sold to William Brown and John Logan Campbell in 1851.

Monte Cecilia Park once housed a significant wetland named Te Puia, and later Beveridge Swamp. This was later drained and used for farming. Business Thomas Russell was the next owner until 1877 when James Williamson bought the farm and built the Pah Homestead on the site. The remains of Whataroa Pā were discovered during construction of the house, which led to the property being known as Pah Farm. The site housed beef and dairy cattle as well as fields of oats. Chinese market gardeners also grew vegetables which were used at the Pah Homestead and sold at Auckland markets. Today, the area not part of the present park is the site of Marcellin College and suburban housing.

The park landscape as seen today was created by James Williamson's head gardener, John Blackmoore. The aim was to create a grand English landscape in a style popularised by Lancelot 'Capability' Brown and to frame the view toward Maungakiekie One Tree Hill.

Monte Cecilia Park became an Auckland Council park in 2004.

== Flora and fauna ==
Monte Cecilia Park houses a living collection of exotic trees including the Chilean wine palm, Australian bunya bunya pines, Moreton Bay figs, Atlantic blue cedar, blue lillypilly, camphor laurel, Dutch elm, hoop pine and holm oaks. Many of these trees are the oldest of their species in New Zealand.

When the wetland was present it would have been home to birds species such as fernbird, banded rail, Australian bittern, and brown teal. Now, the park is home to local natives species such as tūī, kererū and fantail as well as introduced species such as the common starling, common mynah, Eurasian blackbird, song thrush, and house sparrow.

== Controversies ==
In 2025 Auckland council proposed changes to off leash dog rules to decrease the amount of off leash area, which was met with minor opposition though a Facebook group called Dog lovers of Monte Cecilia, who took the council to court and lost.

The council claims the public is at significant risk at Monte Cecilia Park because of off leash dogs, which has significant public agreement.
