= Gregor Kregar =

Gregor Kregar (born 1972) is a New Zealand-Slovenian sculptor.

Kregar was born in Ljubljana and educated at the University of Ljubljana and the Elam School of Fine Arts in Auckland, New Zealand. His works have been exhibited in New Zealand, Australia, Slovenia, and the United States.

A 2015 work, Transit Cloud, created in collaboration with Sara Hughes (artist) and Davor Popadich (artist) was installed in the alleyway between McCrae Way and Totara Avenue, New Lynn as part of the New Lynn transformation project. The sculpture is part of the Auckland City Art Collection. It attracted public controversy after critics said it looked like a giant penis.

In 2019 one of his pieces, Thinker, was stolen from outside a galley in Auckland. The piece was later returned.

== Works ==
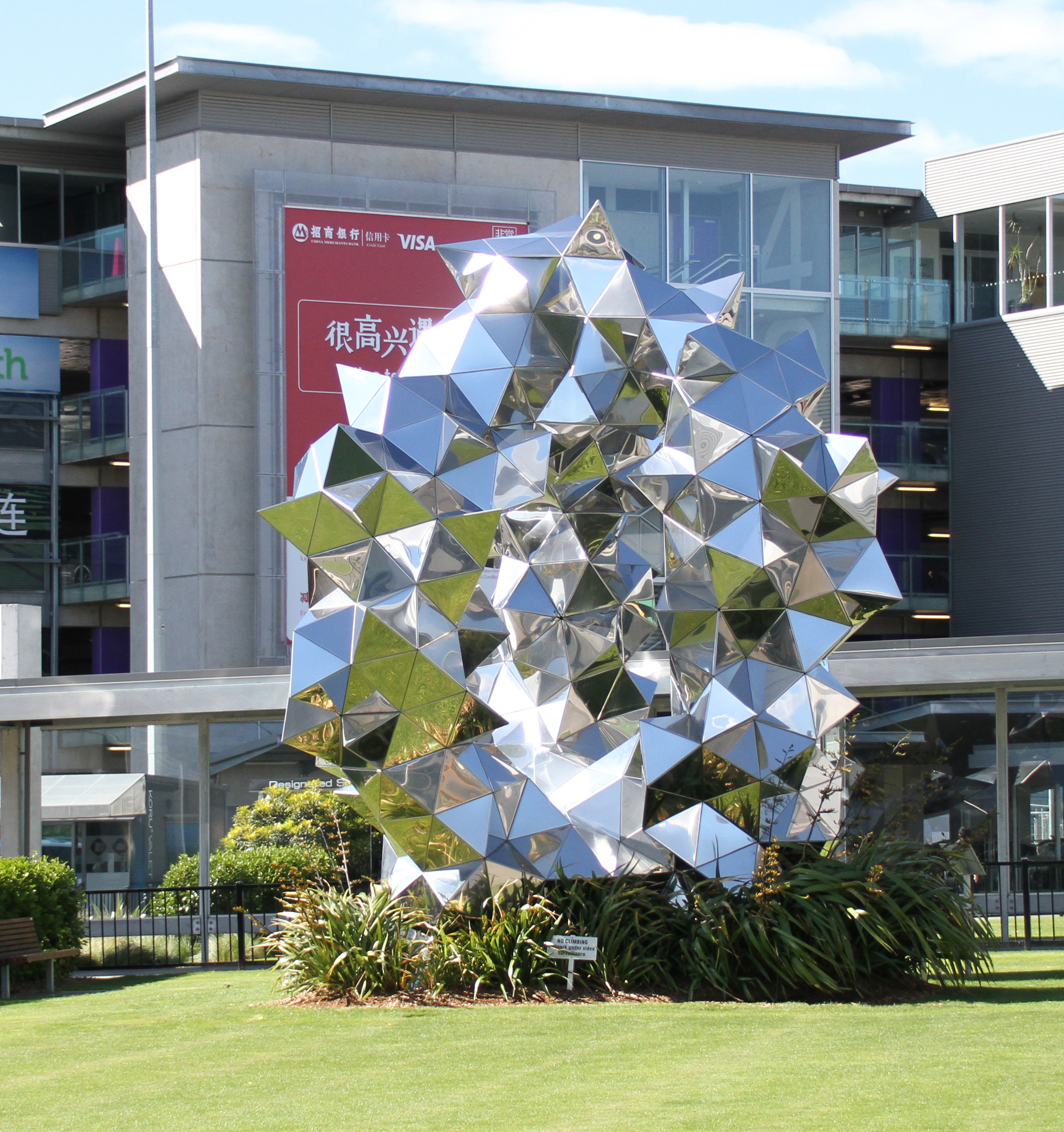
"Cumulus Gate Pavilion For Richard Pearse" at Christchurch Airport

- Cumulus Gate Pavilion For Richard Pearse (2012) – Christchurch airport.
- Transit Cloud (2015) – mesh clouds – Auckland.
- Reflective Lullaby (2015) – giant stainless steel gnome, Melbourne.
- Terminator T-Rex (2017) – stainless steel dinosaur, Christchurch.
- Whaiwhakaaoroaro ("deep thinker") (2020) – Bronze gnome in Palmerston North.
- Boom Boom (2025) – stainless steel dinosaur in Taupō.
