= John Parker (potter) =

New Zealand ceramicist and theatre designer

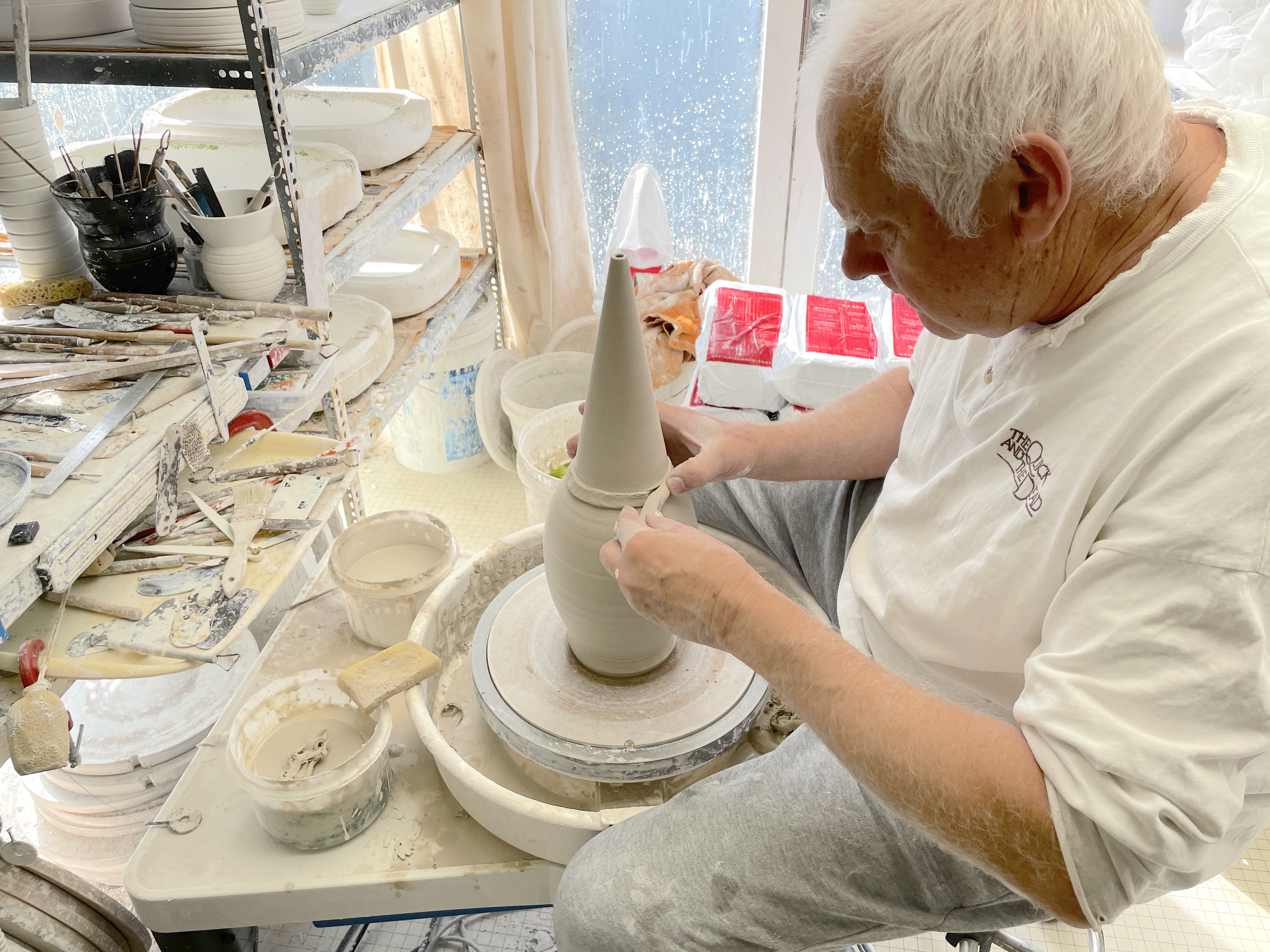
- John Parker in his Auckland studio, 2021
- Born: 7 July 1947 (age 79)
- Education: MFA Royal College of Art, London (1973-1975)
- Known for: Ceramics and theatre design
- Awards: 1999 Life Membership Auckland Studio Potters / 2004 Chapman Tripp Theatre Awards: Set Designer of the Year / 2010 Arts Foundation Laureate Award

John Parker (born 1947) is a New Zealand ceramicist and theatre designer.

== Early life ==
John Parker was born in Auckland, New Zealand on 7 July 1947. Between 1952 and 1965 he attended Panmure Bridge Primary, Tamaki Intermediate, Howick District High School, Tamaki College and the University of Auckland.

== Education ==
In 1970 Parker graduated from Auckland Teachers College with a Teachers College Diploma with Distinction. He attended the Royal College of Art, London, from 1973 to 1975, graduating with a Master of Fine Arts. He returned to New Zealand in 1977.

Recalling his time at the RCA in 1990, Parker said:

"I discovered commercial stains, industrial techniques; I started working with porcelain, using an electric wheel and firing with electricity. I'd always been interested in starkness, and the purity of form and control and in black and white. Firing with electricity at college gave me the control that I'd been battling against in the cone 10 reduction syndrome. Now I could eliminate random flash effects; I even started to spray glazes."

== Ceramics career ==
Parker began night classes with potter Margaret Milne in Auckland in 1966, when he was 19. In the 1988 book Profiles: 24 New Zealand Potters he recalled:

I have always made things, but not always pots. Being an only child, I learnt to be resourceful. My childhood passions were for puppets, playhouse museum exhibits, chemistry sets and then as a magician. Pottery came quite by accident. During a very unhappy time struggling with maths, chemistry and physics for a B.Sc., I kept a friend company in a pottery night-school class.

In 1967 he built a stoneware kiln with Grant Hudson, and in 1969 became a member of the World Crafts Council. From 1977 to 1981 he was director of the Auckland Studio Potters Centre.

Parker's work shows a long interest in both industrial and modernist ceramics. In 2013 he was a finalist in the Portage Ceramic Awards with the work Waitakere Still Life of Ernie and Keith and Ewald, a group of white lustre vases which referenced key potters Ernest Shufflebotham, who designed for Crown Lynn in New Zealand, Keith Murray, who trained Shufflebotham at Wedgwood, and Swedish designer Ewald Dahlskog, whose ceramics shown in London in the 1930s had inspired Murray.

Key influences include Hans Coper, who was his tutor at the Royal College, and Lucie Rie, a long-term mentor and friend. Of Rie he has said "I identified immediately with Lucie Rie's work, her interest in pure form and simplicity, her design flair and attention to detail and finish. She includes nothing unnecessary in her pots". This sets Parker apart from many New Zealand potters of his own and the previous generation, who, guided by Bernard Leach, looked to Japan for their inspiration. Craft historian Helen Schamroth writes that Parker's 'aesthetic sensibility and philosophy are more related to the European design movements of de Stijl and the Bauhaus than to Bernard Leach and [Shoji] Hamada, who influenced a number of his peers'.

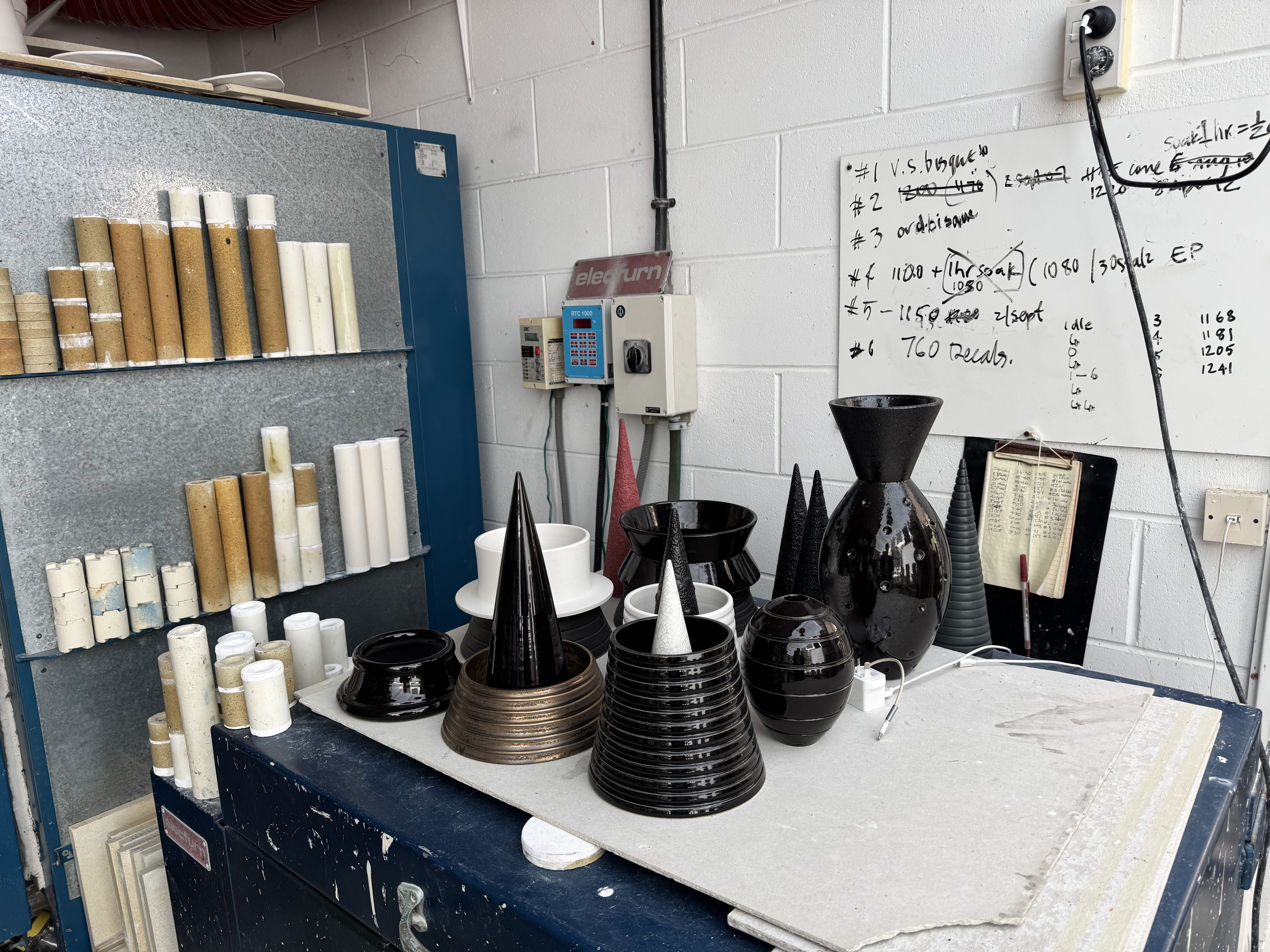
John Parker's Auckland studio, 2024

In 1988 he said about his work:

Most of the shapes I work in go against the natural organic tendencies of clay and gravity. You have to make up new techniques to get what you want. I will use anything to aid the process of getting there. I am very Machiavellian when it comes to masking tape and string. I tend to throw blanks as finely as I can and severely turn them into the precise shapes I intend. I use metal kidneys most of the time and work on any surface I can reach. I stretch and coax rather than throw shapes. Bowls are always turned inside and out. I am not interested in the random and the spontaneous. I want to be better than a lathe, more plastic than plastic. I have a considerable failure rate at all stages of the process. If you are not losing work, you know you are not pushing things far enough. I like working on a tightrope and in areas I don't know anything about.

Reviewers of Parker's work often comment on his pieces' simplicity, precision, elegance, finish (either extremely smooth or craggily textured), use of black, white, and brilliant polychrome colours, and undermining conventions through unusual textures, colours, shapes and displays. Parker himself has said:

"I am interested in the ordinariness and the normality of conventional china cabinet and mantelpiece decorative art ceramic ornaments and then pushing these to extremes or the straightforwardly bizarre. I want them to be deceptively pretty and appealing – like a confidence trap. I am primarily interested in form rather than use. I play with the anti-function of functional ware. Bowls which are difficult to use because of their shape or because of obstacles in the way but which are still bowls. Bottles which would be difficult to fill with any liquid but which are still bottles. Form foils function."

Parker is known for using the skills he has developed as a theatre designer to present strongly designed installations of groups of his ceramic works. In Profiles: 24 New Zealand Potters he noted:

Having been a self-employed potter most of my working life, I find the newer areas of theatre design and writing about film are similarly very time-consuming and labour-intensive. All my interests are visual. They all concern the drama of reactions to shape and colour and arrangement. They are all theatrical. There was a time when I suspected I only made pots to be able to display them.

In 2002 City Gallery Wellington mounted a 30-year survey of Parker's work titled John Parker: Ceramics.

In September 2016 Te Uru Waitakere Contemporary Gallery launched John Parker: Cause and Effect, an exhibition and accompanying publication of the same name, celebrating Parker's 50 years of practice. In October 2016 the Museum of New Zealand Te Papa Tongarewa opened John Parker: Handmade Precision.

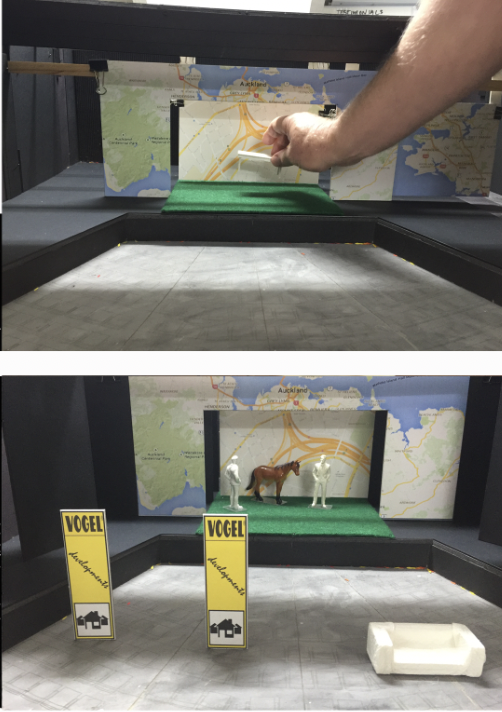
John Parker working on one of his stage set models, October 2015

== Theatre career ==
Parker is a set designer for theatre and performing arts. He has designed over 23 productions drama and musical theatre with Auckland Theatre Company including The 25th Annual Putnam County Spelling Bee, Mum’s Choir, Middle Age Spread, The Rocky Horror Show, Noises Off, Waiting For Godot, Rosencrantz and Guildernstein Are Dead, Into The Woods and The Glass Menagerie. Other productions he has done the set design for include opera's Pagliacci and Il Trovatore and New Zealand play Waiora.

== Publications ==
In 1988 Parker co-authored Profiles: 24 New Zealand Potters with fellow potter Cecilia Parkinson, published by David Bateman Ltd. The 24 potters featured were:

- Catherine Anselmi
- Anneke Borren
- Sue Clifford
- John Crawford
- Steve Fullmer
- Brian Gartside
- David Griffith
- Jean Hastedt
- Campbell Hegan
- Alan Kestle
- Leo King
- Peter Lange
- Patti Meads
- Margaret Milne
- Chester Nealie
- John Parker
- Cecilia Parkinson
- Rick Rudd
- Katherine Sanderson
- Robyn Stewart
- Sally Vinson
- Shane Wagstaff
- Howard Williams
- Merilyn Wiseman

In 2002 John Parker: Ceramics was published by David Bateman Ltd to accompany Parker's survey exhibition at City Gallery Wellington. The book includes an interview with Parker by Jim Barr and Mary Barr, essays by ceramics historian Janet Mansfield and design historian Douglas Lloyd-Jenkins and a chronology.

In 2016, John Parker: Cause and Effect was published by Te Uru Waitakere Contemporary Gallery to accompany Parker's 50-year survey at Te Uru. It includes contributions by Jim Barr and Mary Barr, Garth Clark, Andrew Clifford, Grace Cochrane and Douglas Lloyd Jenkins, with new photography by Haruhiko Sameshima including a collaboration with lighting designer Phillip Dexter.

== Awards and recognitions ==
In 1999 Parker was made a life member of Auckland Studio Potters and awarded the Waitakere City Millennium Medal for services to the community. In 2004 Parker received Set Designer of the Year at the Chapman Tripp Theatre Awards for Big River.

In 2007 Parker was elected a member of the International Academy of Ceramics, Geneva. In 2010 he was recognised with a Laureate Award from the Arts Foundation of New Zealand.
