= Visual Arts Association =

New Zealand professional organisation for designers

- Abbreviation: VAA
- Formation: 1952; 74 years ago
- Dissolved: 1971
- Type: Learned society
- Purpose: Art and design promotion
- Location: Dunedin, New Zealand

The Visual Arts Association, also referred to as the Visual Arts Society and VAA, formed in Dunedin, New Zealand, in 1952, for the encouragement and promotion of good design.

== Background ==
A proposal for the establishment of a permanent national body called the Visual Arts Council, "to co-ordinate, direct and advise on all national visual art matters", had been submitted by the Auckland Society of Arts (ASA), to the Minister of Education, Ronald Algie, in 1950. "The Council should advise and make recommendations to the National Council for Adult Education and other bodies." ASA also urged that local societies be represented in regional councils. By 1954 discussion on the establishment of an Arts Council in New Zealand looked to combine some chief functions of such British organisations as the Arts Council of Great Britain, the Council of Industrial Design, and the Royal Fine Art Commission.

The Visual Arts Association (VAA) formed in Dunedin in 1952, following several meetings to establish a society to stimulate general interest in the visual arts, particularly industrial design, convened by the Adult Education Department of the University of Otago in 1951. Though a voluntary organisation, their 1952 pamphlet noted that their terms of reference were similar those of the Council of Industrial Design in Britain. They promoted design and the arts through exhibitions, lectures, panel discussions and films.

The VAA's first event in 1953, a modern room setting exhibiting locally sourced contemporary tableware and New Zealand made furniture, was installed in the lecture hall of the Dunedin Public Library. It sought to empower consumers with an appreciation of design in commonly used items. It also set the pattern for their future exhibitions.

In 1957, Oswold Stephens and the VAA organised the first exhibition of New Zealand Studio Potters at Otago Museum, Dunedin, for 16–30 November. Determined to achieve an effective standard of display, the exhibition was designed by architect Geoffrey Nees. Fifteen potters from all over New Zealand were invited to contribute—Martin Beck (Auckland), Doreen Blumhardt (Wellington), Minna Bondy (Wellington), Barry Brickell (Auckland), Len Castle (Auckland), Helen Dawson (Dunedin), Grete Graetzer (Dunedin), Doris Holland (Christchurch), Olive Jones (Onehunga), Mavis Jack (Wanganui), Helen Mason (Wellington), Patricia Perrin (Auckland), Oswold Stephens (Dunedin), Peter Stichbury (Auckland), Lee Thomson (Wellington).

=== Presidents ===
VAA chairpersons and presidents included: J E P Murphy, Tom Esplin, Charles Brasch, M J Gilbert, Margaret Mathie Dunningham and Gary Blackman.
