= New Zealand Potter =

Magazine about pottery in New Zealand

New Zealand Potter was a biannual, and later triannual, periodical magazine focused on the subject of pottery in New Zealand. It was co-founded in 1958 by potters Helen Mason and Doreen Blumhardt. After 40 years of publication, the magazine ceased with its 40th volume in 1998.

The history of the publication is divided into three periods. From 1958–1975 vol. 1, no.1 to vol 17, no. 1, were published by New Zealand Potter, Wellington, N.Z. in a black and white 20 cm tall format with a colour cover, sizing up to a 28 cm format in 1972. From 1975 to 1993 vol. 17, no. 2 to vol. 35, no. 3, were still published by New Zealand Potter, Wellington, but the format increased to a 30 cm tall size and the name abbreviated to "Potter". During this time the magazine began to be issued with pages in 4 colour print from 1985 onward. From 1994 to 1998 publication moved to New Zealand Potter Pub. Auckland, N.Z. and vol 36, no. 1 to vol 40, no. 2 reverted to using the original name in the same 30 cm tall format.

The content of the magazine covers a wide range of associated topics including coverage of the annual New Zealand Potters exhibition and other events, photography of pottery, illustrations, articles on indigenous pottery practices from outside New Zealand, biopic articles on local potters, technical and scientific articles, aesthetic writing, articles on associated handcrafts, gallery advertising, equipment advertising and obituaries.

Contributors to the magazine cover a wide range of figures within the New Zealand pottery community. Some notable contributors include Doreen Blumhardt, Helen Mason, Barry Brickell, Yvonne Rust, Mirek Smisek, Margaret Milne, Colleen Waata Urlich, John Parker, Len Castle, Roy Cowan, Peter Lange, Michael Cardew and Bernard Leach.

An anthology of articles selected from the years 1958 to 1967 was published in December 2017 under the title "New Zealand Potter: A Partial Archive", edited by Emma Bugden and published by Small Bore Books.
