= Muswellbrook Art Prize =

Australian art prize

The Muswellbrook Art Prize is an acquisitive art competition hosted by the Muswellbrook Regional Arts Centre in the Muswellbrook Shire, New South Wales, Australia.

== History ==
The competition was first held in 1958, at that time as the Festival of the Valley Art Prize, as an annual event until the establishment of the Regional Arts Centre as a purpose-built standalone complex in 1999.

=== Timeline ===
1958 - Festival of the Valley Art Prize opened in Muswellbrook as an annual acquisitive art competition

1956 - Works on Paper category added to the Art Prize (as the Drawing Prize)

1961 - Acquisitive Traditional Prize category added to the Art Prize (until 1968)

1971 - Acquisitive Muswellbrook Pottery Prize category added to the Art Prize (until 1976)

1974 - Art Prize renamed The Muswellbrook Art Prize and Purchase Exhibition and The Muswellbrook Pottery Prize

1987 - Acquisitive Muswellbrook Pottery Prize renamed Muswellbrook Open Ceramic Award a restored as a category

1987 - Acquisitive Muswellbrook Photographic Award category added to the Art Prize

2002 - Muswellbrook Art Prize becomes a biennial event with winning art works housed in the Muswellbrook Regional Arts Centre Collection

2016 - Prize monies increased to $50,000 for Painting, $10,000 for Works on Paper, and $10,000 for Ceramics

2021 - Acquisitive Mullins Conceptual Photography Prize added to the collection of Photography again.

== Description ==
The objective of the Muswellbrook Art Prize was stated at inception as '...to foster the interest in and understanding of art in the Upper Hunter Valley and to play a part, however modest, in the promotion of art and the encouragement of artists generally throughout Australia, the prize winning works to form the nucleus of a Muswellbrook Municipal Council Collection.'

At $70,000, the Muswellbrook Art Prize was in 2016 the second-richest art prize in South-East Asia.

== Muswellbrook Art Prize Winners 2011-2015 ==
=== 2011 Prize Winners ===
Catherine and Jennifer Strut (Painting)

Peter Griffen (Works on Paper)

Jan Downes (Ceramics)

=== 2013 Prize Winners ===
Margaret Loy Pula (Painting)

Claire Martin (Works in Paper)

Vicki Hamilton (Ceramics)

=== 2015 Prize Winners ===
Nick Ferguson (Painting)

John Bokor (Works on Paper)

Jane McKenzie (Ceramics)

=== All Prize Winners 1958-2015 ===
==== Painting ====
Suzanne Archer
David Aspden
Peter Atkins
Alec Baker
Sydney Ball
Michael Bell
Marion Borgelt
Dorothy Braund
Viola Bromley
Liz Cuming
Jacqueline Dabron
Stephen Earle
Nick Ferguson
Roy Fluke
Dale Frank
Peter Gardiner
Thomas Gleghorn
Geoff Harvey
Weaver Hawkins
Pearl Ingram
Jean Isherwood
Louis James
Ian Johnstone
Colin Jordan
Hanna Kay
Michael Kitching
Richard Larter
Margot Lewers
Margaret Loy Pula
Elwyn Lynn
John Martin
Noel McKenna
Dennis Miller
John Montefiore
Angus Nivison
John Ogburn
Mike Parr
William Peascod
Charles Pettinger
David Rankin
Henry Salkauskas
Michael Shannon
Eric Smith
David Strachan
Catherine & Jennifer Strutt
Lillian Sutherland
Lezlie Tilley
Rosemary Valadon
Fred Williams

==== Works on Paper ====
Suzanne Archer
John Bokor
Francis Celtlan
Tony Coleing
Barbara Davidson
Janet Dawson
Garry Foye
Peter Gill
Strom Gould
Guy Grey-Smith
Peter Griffen
Rew Hanks
David Harrex
Ronald Hawke
Mimi Jaksic-Berger
Garry Jones
Jane Lander
Frank McNamara
Claire Martin
Bea Maddock
Kiata Mason
George Moore
Murdo Morrison
Angus Nivison
Robert Shepherd
Paul Smith
Cameron Sparks
Dallas Sym Choon
Imre Szigeti
Rosemary Valadon
Paul White
Margaret Wilson
Salvatore Zofrea
Vera Zulumovski

==== Ceramics ====
Hildegard Anstice
William Brownhill
Enid Cryer
Greg Daly
Peter Dobinson
Jan Downes
Toni Fischer
Vicki Hamilton
Gudrun Klix
Joanne Linsdell
William Lungas
Janet Mansfield
Jane McKenzie
Kathryn McMiles
Bunty Mitchell
Susanne Moore
Lyn Nash
Chester Nealie
Megan Puls
Pam Sinnott
Vipoo Srivilasa
Ray Taylor
Peter Tilley
Peter Wheeler

== Muswellbrook Art Prize adjudicators 1958-2015 ==
Bruce Adams
John Bailey
Tony Bond
William Bowmore
Barbara Blaxland
David Bradshaw
Roger Butler
Edmund Capon
Grace Cochrane
Dennis Colesy
Tracy Cooper-Lavery
Richard Crebbin
Enid Cryer
Gill Docking
Deborah Edwards
Joe Eisenberg
Judi Elliot
Andrew Fergusson
Brian Finemore
Tim Fisher
James Gleeson
Mollie Grieves
Gillian Grigg
Michael Hedger
John Henshaw
Sali Herman
Ian Howard
Robert Hughes
Garry Jones
Michael Keighery
Peter Laverty
Euan MacDonald
Ivan McMeekin
Hal Missingham
Nick Mitzevich
Bernice Murphy
Chester Nealie
John Olsen
Peter O’Neill
Desiderius Orban
Barry Pearce
Ron Ramsey
Lloyd Rees
Peter Rushforth
Anne Ryan
Bernard Sahm
Maisy Stapleton
Leigh Summers
Helen Sweeney
Daniel Thomas
David Thomas
Laurie Thomas
Peter Timms
Bruce Tindale
Tony Tuckson
Guy Warren
Joy Warren
Jane Watters
Bill Wright

== Muswellbrook Art Prize sponsors 1958-2015 ==
Muswellbrook Shire Council
Costain Coal Australia Ltd
Esso Standard Oil (Australia) Ltd
Hebden Mining Company
Hunter Valley Printing Company Pty Ltd
Muswellbrook Coal Company
Peabody Resources Ltd
State Bank of NSW
Upper Hunter Timbers Pty Ltd
Bengalla Mining Company Pty Ltd
