= Rick Rudd =

New Zealander potter

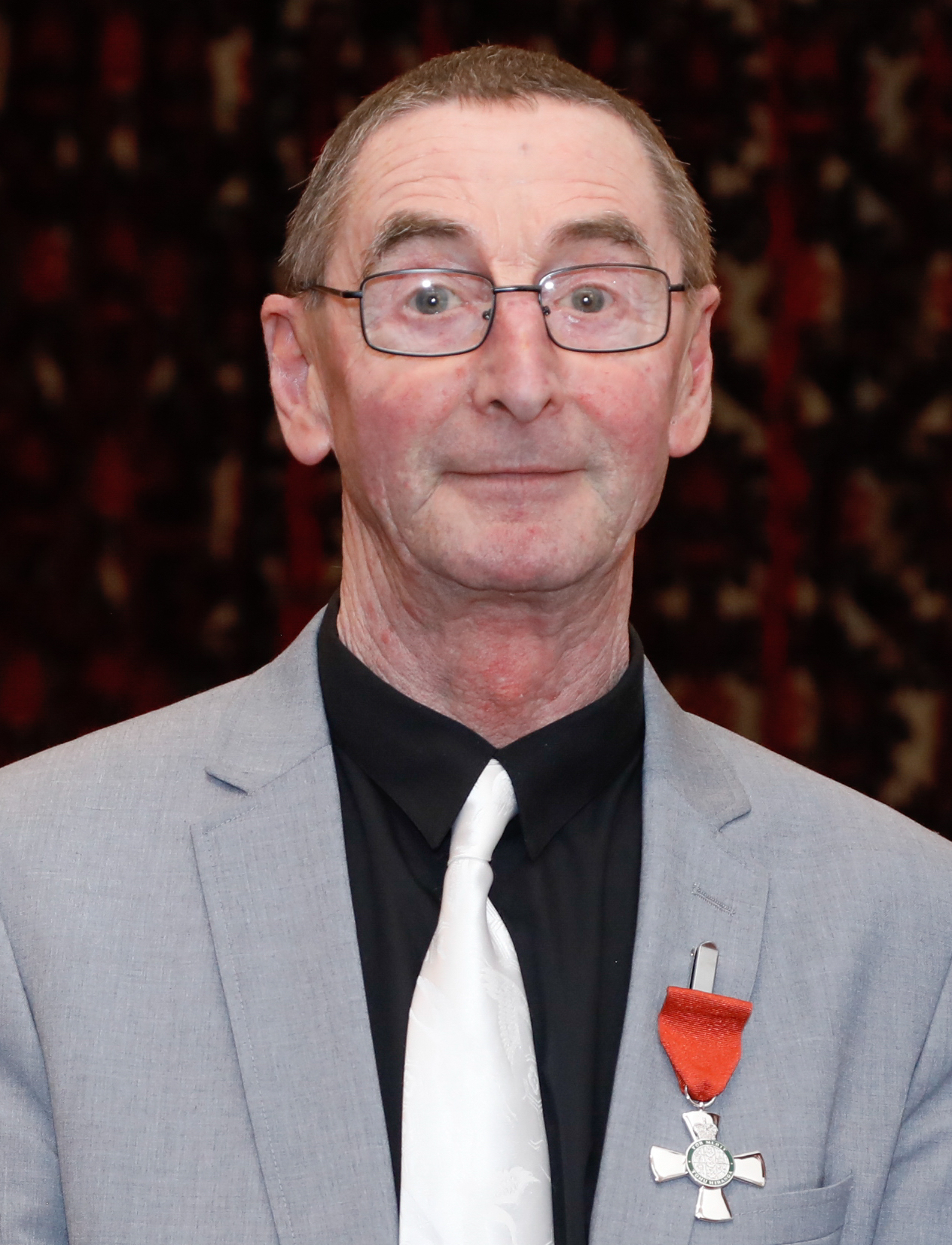
Rudd in 2020

Richard Steward Rudd MNZM (born 1949) is an English-born New Zealand potter.

== Education and early life ==
Rudd was born in Great Yarmouth and completed a Diploma of Art and Design at Wolverhampton College of Art. He emigrated to New Zealand in 1973 and settled in Wanganui.

== Career ==
Rudd originally enrolled at art school with the intention of studying textile design but was attracted to clay work through the three-month introduction to pottery he attended as part of his first year of training. In the 1988 book Profiles: 24 New Zealand Potters, Rudd recalled:

My training in ceramics at Great Yarmouth and Wolverhampton colleges of art in England over a period of four years was inclined towards sculptural rather than domestic ware. My work from 1978 to mid 1986 was raku fired and each piece was an exercise in line and form. Since then it has become more figurative, with inspiration taken from the human body, but still with the emphasis on form and line.

He cites Lucie Rie and Hans Coper as early influences on his work, along with the sculpture of Henry Moore and Barbara Hepworth. He was also influenced by the domestic ware produced by Bernard Leach, who along with Shōji Hamada launched the modern Anglo-Japanese pottery movement in Britain.

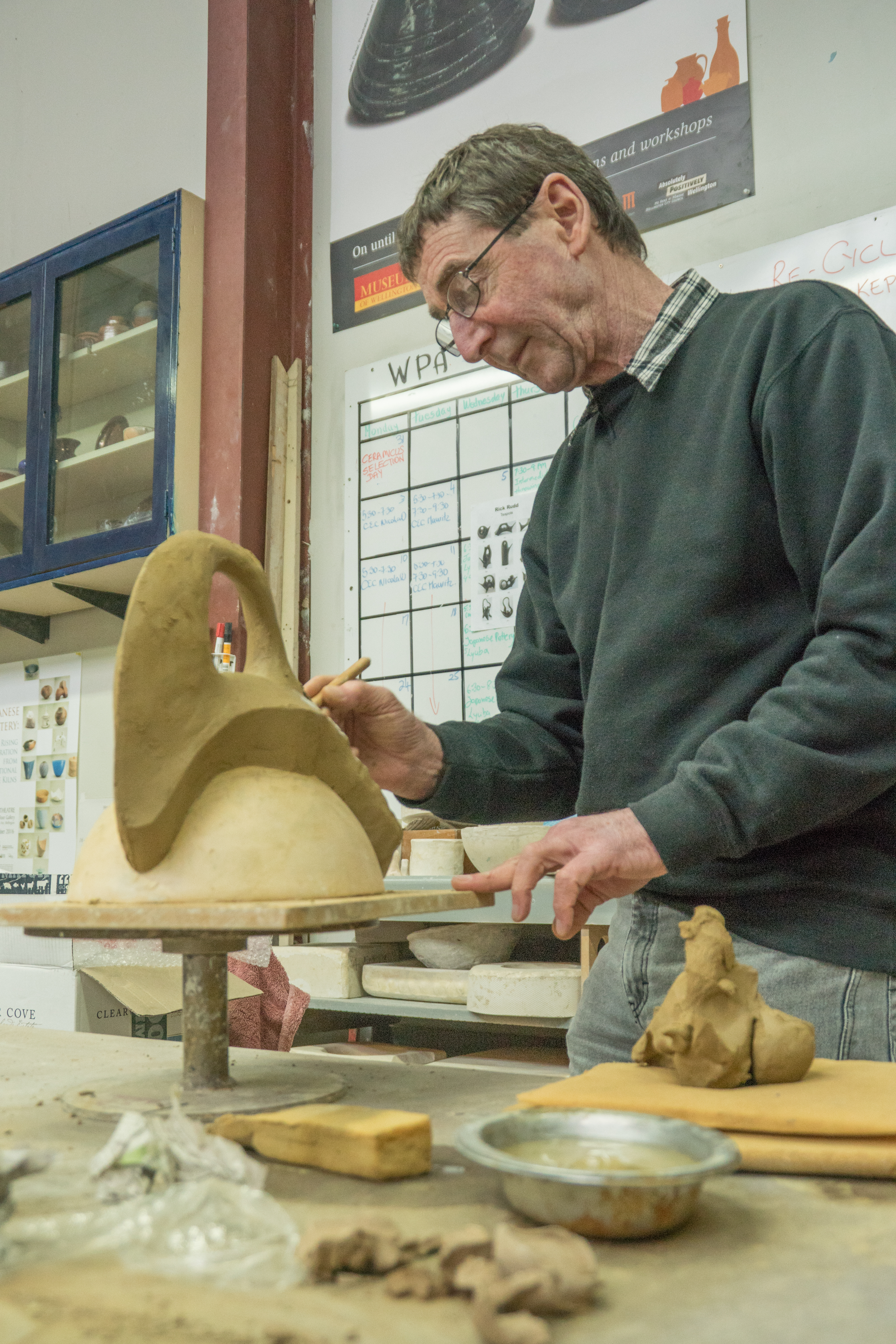
Rudd at Wellington Potters Association in 2015

Much of Rudd's work has been produced within self-set limitations on materials and glazes, resulting in black, grey and white forms where interest is created by contrast between smooth, textured and shiny surfaces. A Queen Elizabeth II Arts Council grant in 1992 led to a period of experimentation with colour through glazes and firing techniques. In 1998 craft historian Helen Schamroth described Rudd's work in colour as 'brief flirtations' amongst his characteristic use of restrained palettes.

In recent years colour has made a greater appearance in Rudd's work. His 2015 survey show Rick Rudd: Beyond True to Form at the Sarjeant Gallery, for example, features series such as Ten Green Bottles (2012), forms glazed in shades of lime green and teal, and grouping of pastel teapots.

Rudd has continuously explored certain forms throughout his career. Ceramic historian Janet Mansfield writes 'Most of his forms are vessel derived but their purpose is an exploration of sculptural form'. A major 1996 survey of Rudd's work at the Sarjeant Gallery divided his work into five formal groupings: box, bottle, bowl, vessel and figurative. Writing in the exhibition catalogue, Paul Raynor describes how the functional terms are pushed to their extremes by Rudd: a ‘bottle’ is an ‘enclosed vessel, without a handle and with a small aperture at its highest point’ and a bowl is ‘an open vessel with its widest point at, or near, its lip’ but actual works may not look or function anything like a traditional bottle or bowl.

In addition to abstract forms, often geometrically inspired (such as his 'Mobius twists' of the 1980s), Rudd has also had a figurative side to his practice. While at art school he visited Dudley Zoo to sketch the primates, and his work has featured chimpanzees, gorillas, mandrills and orangutans.

In 1979 Rudd produced a series of plaques featuring Hollywood movie stars like Fred Astaire, Ginger Rogers and Marilyn Monroe. At the time Rudd was producing a radio talkback show for David Hartnell in Auckland, and had visited Universal Studios in California on a trip organised by Hartnell.

In the 1980s Rudd made works where male and female torsos appear to be emerging from columns, which 'allude to the sculptural tradition of carving from a block'. His 2015 survey exhibition Rick Rudd: Beyond True to Form included numerous figurative pieces such as the group Second Childhood made up of objects that call back to childhood: a teapot shaped like a wheeled elephant toy, a monkey puppet, a comic policeman with a truncheon and a ventriloquist's doll. Pieces such as these, or Lucky! Teapot (2011), showing a leaping cat squashed by a falling brick, draw on the English tradition of novelty collectable teapots.

== Ceramics museum ==
In 2014 Rudd purchased a 1970s apartment building in central Whanganui with the intent of transforming the building into a ceramics museum displaying his own work and the work of other New Zealand ceramic artists he has collected over the years.

== Honours, awards and collections ==
In the 2020 Queen's Birthday Honours, Rudd was appointed a Member of the New Zealand Order of Merit, for services to ceramic art.

Rudd has won numerous awards for his ceramics, including:

- Fletcher Brownbuilt Pottery Award (winner 1978, 1980; merit award 1982, 1983)
- Norsewear Art Award (pottery award winner, 1995; merit award 2000)
- New Zealand Society of Potters National Exhibition (merit award 1994, 2001; functional excellence award 2009)
- Whanganui Arts Review (merit award, 1995, 1998; joint winner 2001)
- WaiClay National Ceramic Award (merit award, 2004)
- Portage Ceramic Awards (People's Choice award, 2012)

His works are held in the collections of the Auckland Museum, Waikato Museum, The Dowse Art Museum, Te Manawa, Christchurch Art Gallery, Southland Museum and Art Gallery, MTG Hawke's Bay, Sarjeant Gallery, and Otago Museum.
