= Richard Stratton =

Richard Stratton may refer to:

- Richard Stratton (college president) (born 1958), American academic administrator
- Richard Stratton (diplomat) (1924–1988), British diplomat
- Richard Stratton (artist) (born 1970), New Zealand ceramic artist
- Richard A. Stratton (born 1931), American naval officer

== See also ==
- Rick Stratton, American makeup and special effects artist
