= New Zealand Centennial Exhibition =

Exhibition in Rongotai, New Zealand between September 1939-May 1940

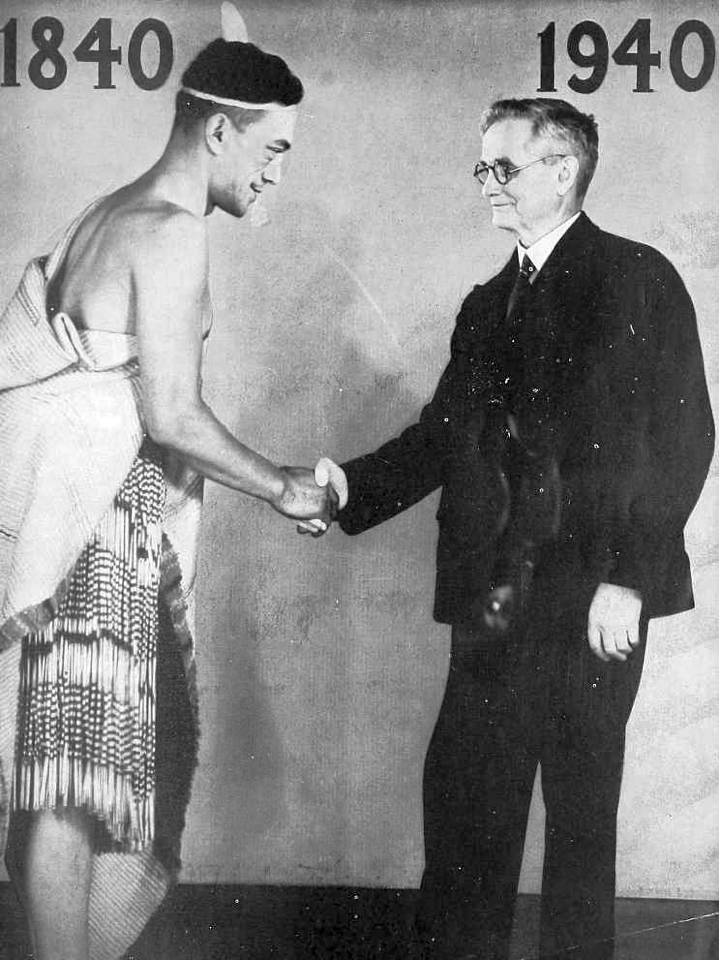
Then Prime Minister, Michael Joseph Savage shaking hands with a man at the exhibition

The New Zealand Centennial Exhibition took place over six months from Wednesday 8 November 1939 until 4 May 1940. It celebrated one hundred years since the signing of the Treaty of Waitangi in 1840 and the subsequent mass European settlement of New Zealand. 2,641,043 (2.6 million) visitors attended the exhibition.

The New Zealand Government staged the exhibition with assistance from local government, New Zealand industry and the New Zealand public. The exhibition received support from the United Kingdom, Australia, Canada, Fiji and other Pacific islands who either constructed their own pavilions on site or had displays in one of the exhibition buildings.

== Opening ==
The exhibition was opened on 8 November 1939 by the Governor-General, The Viscount Galway and the Mayor of Wellington, Thomas Hislop.

== Location ==
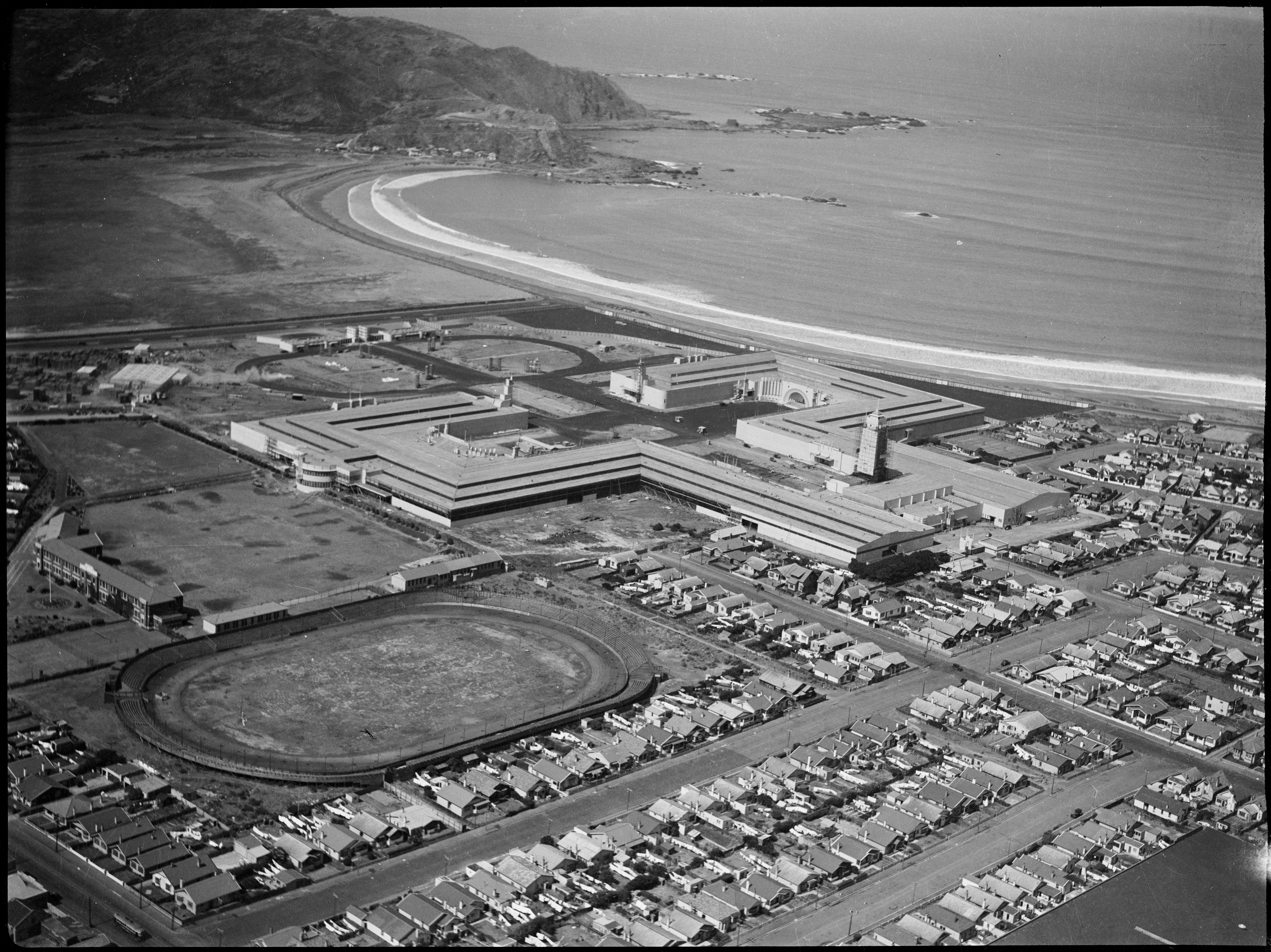
Aerial view of Rongotai in 1939 showing the exhibition buildings

The exhibition took for its site a location at Rongotai in Wellington, Edmund Anscombe designing the buildings and grounds in the Art Deco style. Construction began on 27 April 1939 by the firm Fletcher and Love Construction Companies and over 1,000 staff were employed in the process of building the exhibition. The exhibition grounds were just over 55 acres (220,000 m^{2}) in size, with the main buildings accounting for around 14 acres (57,000 m^{2}) of this.

Feature structures included:

- the Centennial Tower, the main focus of attention, standing 155 feet (47 m) tall and weighing 700 tons. This icon featured on many of the souvenirs celebrating the exhibition.
- a statue of a Neriad (a sea-woman on a seahorse) standing in the central fountain.
- the New Zealand Railways Department stand featuring a working model-railway constructed to scale and maintained by Frank Roberts (model maker).

2,641,043 (2.6 million) visitors attended the exhibition. The last time an event of such a scale had been held was the New Zealand and South Seas International Exhibition in 1925–26, when 3.2 million visitors were counted at the exhibition in Dunedin. Anscombe had also been the architect for the Dunedin exhibition.

== Photography ==
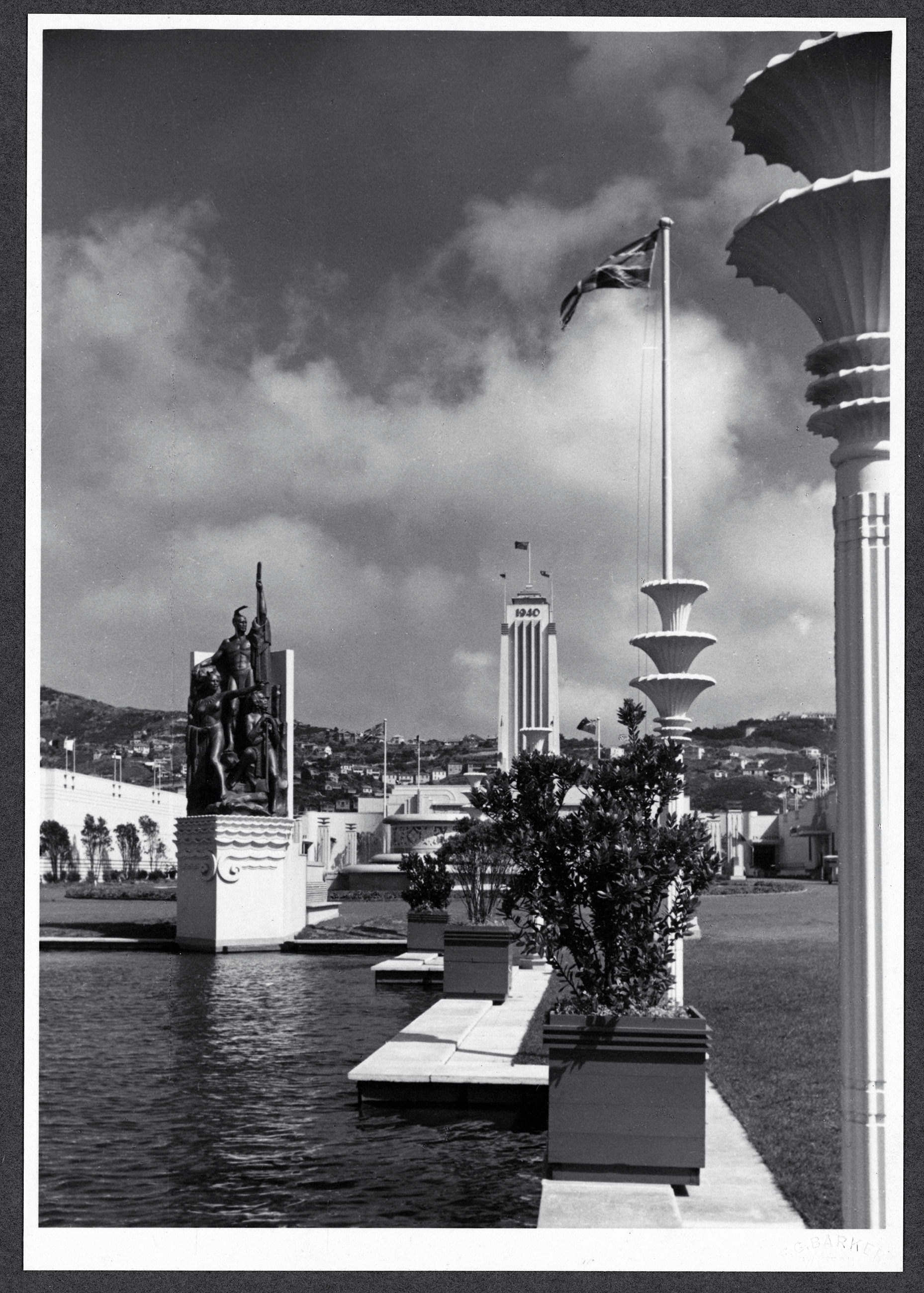
Kupe Statue at the Centennial Exhibition

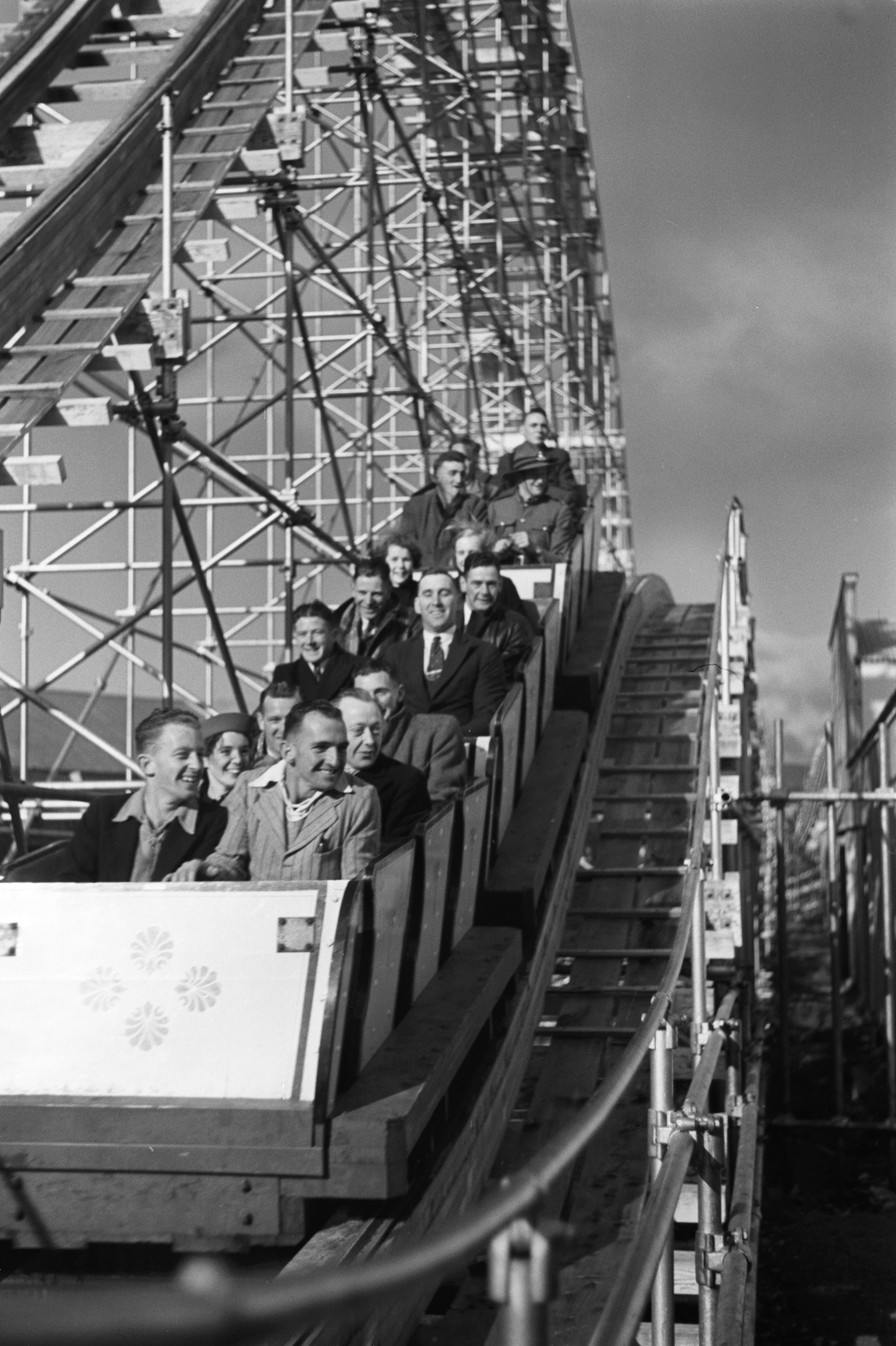
Roller coaster

In February 1938 tenders were invited by the New Zealand Centennial Exhibition Company Ltd for official photographer for the Exhibition. The submission of Eileen Olive Deste (1908–1986) included a testimonial from John A. Lee, under-secretary for housing in the Labour government, for a housing-exhibition project in the Kirkcaldie and Stains gallery in 1937. Deste won the exclusive right to photograph exhibits or any other object in the exhibition buildings or grounds, with a percentage of the gross takings from the sale of the photographs going to the Exhibition Company. The photography rights covered all aspects of the exhibition, from construction to closing. Deste flew above the site in a small plane to take aerial shots, a terrifying but exciting experience, as she later remembered. Deste also entered into an agreement with Coulls Somerville Wilkie Limited to supply photographs for publications and general souvenir material, and her photographs illustrate their Pictorial souvenir of the New Zealand Centennial Exhibition, 1939–1940. Deste's stall in the General Exhibits Building sold photographs and postcards in black and white and colour. Much of the photography at the exhibition came from the camera of an employee, Neville d’Eresby (Des) Aickin, while Deste did the processing and printing at her studio.

== New Zealand Potters ==
In 1939-1940 potters Olive Jones and Elizabeth Matheson demonstrated and sold work at the New Zealand Centennial Exhibition for six months.

== Bands ==
The following bands played during the period of the Exhibition. No dates are mentioned as in most instances several engagements were fulfilled.

- The Port Nicholson Silver Band.
- Wellington City Tramways Band.
- Caledonian Society Pipe Band.
- Wellington Artillery Band.
- Pipes and Drums First Battalion Wellington Regiment.
- Boys' Institute Silver Band.
- Taylor's Novelty Band, Lower Hutt.
- Wellington Metropolitan Police Pipe Band.
- Lower Hutt Municipal Band.
- Woolston Band, Christchurch.
- Timaru Municipal Band.
- Christchurch Municipal Band.
- St. Kilda Band, Dunedin.
- New Brighton Band.
- Band First Battalion Wellington Regiment.
- Koiterangi-Kokatahi Band, Westland.
- The Drum, Trumpet and Bugle Band, Southland Boys' High School.

== Post-exhibition war-time use ==
Plans envisaged using the building only for six months and then dismantling it. But with New Zealand's ongoing participation in World War II (1939–1945), the New Zealand Air Force used the site and some buildings until the end of the war. In 1946 what remained was burnt to the ground.

== See also ==
- Zealandia (personification)
