= Frank Roberts (model maker) =

New Zealander model maker

Frank Roberts (22 January 1882–26 June 1963) was a New Zealand pioneer in building model railways. His models were extremely accurate and reflected the history of the New Zealand railways.

== Early career ==
Roberts spent his early career working for New Zealand Railways Department (NZR) as a cleaner, fireman and driver before becoming a partner in an electrical firm with his brother Jack. In 1903, Roberts built his first model which was of the W^{A} class steam locomotive using a scale of 1:19.

In 1926, Roberts joined the Auckland Model Engineering Society and began building his first garden railway. Using 1¾ inch gauge track, Roberts, his brother George and W. W. Stewart built a large railway (known as the "RSR Railway") over the next 50 years at Roberts home in Epsom, Auckland. Roberts built his models from then on to a scale of 1:24 (G scale). His meticulously accurate working models of examples of the locomotives and rolling stock found on New Zealand railways became a local attraction. The popularity of this layout led to Roberts being commissioned in 1938 by NZR to build and operate a working model train layout for the New Zealand Centennial Exhibition.

== New Zealand Centennial Exhibition ==
Roberts' work for the New Zealand Centennial Exhibition (1939-1940) showed him at the peak of his expertise. The NZR section of the exhibition was extremely popular.

== Preservation ==
Roberts sold his models to the Railways Department in 1950 and was employed by them to maintain them as working models. In June 1993, just prior to privatisation, New Zealand Rail Limited gifted the collection to the Museum of New Zealand Te Papa Tongarewa.
