= Helen Mason (potter) =

New Zealand potter, writer and editor (1915–2014)

Helen Mason MNZM
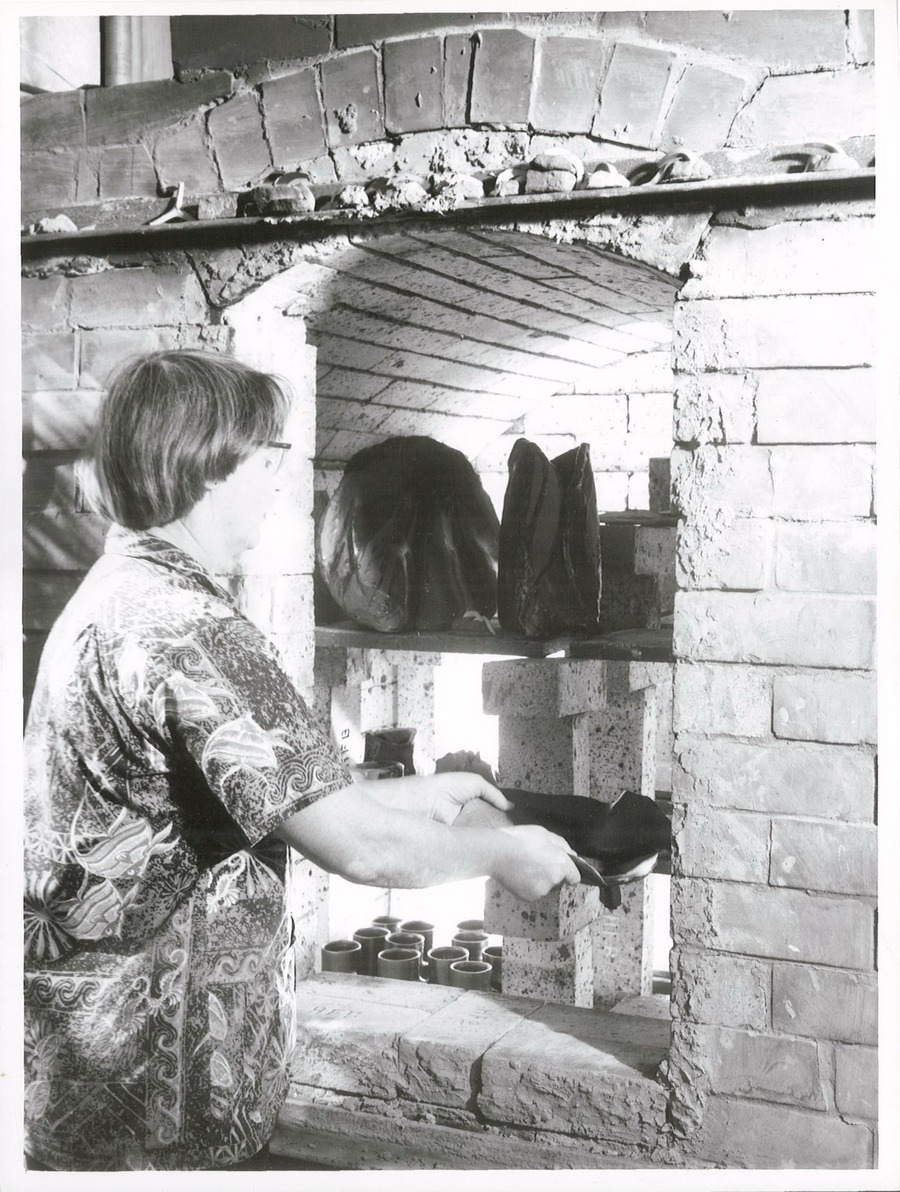
- Born: Helen Wilmot Valentine; 30 April 1915; Darfield, New Zealand
- Died: 22 August 2014 (aged 99); Hawke's Bay, New Zealand
- Known for: pottery, co-founding the magazine New Zealand Potter

Helen Wilmot Mason MNZM (née Valentine; 30 April 1915 – 22 August 2014) was a New Zealand potter as well as the co-founder and editor of the New Zealand Potter magazine for which she also wrote. She was appointed to the New Zealand Order of Merit, for services to pottery, in 2005.

== Biography ==
Born in Darfield in 1915, Mason grew up in Wellington. In 1938 her engagement to Malcolm John Mason was announced, and the couple married the following year.

Mason took up pottery in 1953, attending classes and buying a diesel kiln from her husband's aunt, Elizabeth Matheson. Over the next few years she met and worked with other New Zealand artists including potters Olive Jones, Barry Brickell, Len Castle and Doreen Blumhardt, and painter Colin McCahon, and by 1957 had exhibited and sold her first pot. In 1958, she and Blumhardt co-founded New Zealand Potter magazine, which Mason edited for nine years. The same year she was commissioned to produce the crockery for Wellington's first cafe, the Monde Marie. A stoneware experimentalist, she had by 1964 exhibited in Australia, Japan and Washington.

The early 1960s saw Mason become a full-time potter, and she abandoned her home and marriage, moving to the Waitākere Ranges, then Ōtāne in Hawke's Bay and, in 1974, Tokomaru Bay. It was there that she was involved with establishing the Tauira Craft Centre with Ngoi Pēwhairangi.

In the 1990s she lived in a house truck, purchased with the proceeds from the sale of a McCahon painting, near Brickell's home in Coromandel. She later returned to Hawke's Bay where, from 2006 to 2011, she resided in the eponymous Helen Mason House at the Waiohiki Creative Arts Village.

In the 2005 New Year Honours she was appointed a Member of the New Zealand Order of Merit, for services to pottery. Works by Mason are held in the permanent collection of the Dowse Art Museum.

Described as an influential figure in New Zealand crafts and ceramics at the forefront of the emerging New Zealand pottery movement in the 1950s, Mason exhibited widely in New Zealand and internationally. As well as editing The New Zealand Potter, Mason contributed to the New Zealand Listener and wrote a number of books on pottery and crafts, including Ten years of pottery in New Zealand (1967), Waima of Tokomaru Bay (1984) and Commitment to clay (2008). She featured in an episode of the television arts show The Big Art Trip in 2002. In 2005, she published her memoir, entitled Helen Mason's scrapbook: 50 years as a backyard potter.
