= Lawrence North =

New Zealand baptist minister and administrator

Lawrence North OBE
- Born: Lawrence Alfred North; 5 November 1903; Ghum, India
- Died: 21 October 1980 (aged 76); Christchurch, New Zealand
- Occupation: Baptist minister

Lawrence Alfred North OBE (5 November 1903 – 21 October 1980) was a New Zealand Baptist minister and administrator. He was born in Ghum, India, on 5 November 1903.

In the 1971 Queen's Birthday Honours, North was appointed an Officer of the Order of the British Empire, for services as a minister of religion.
