= Elizabeth Matheson (potter) =

New Zealand potter

Elizabeth Matheson BEM
- Born: 19 January 1890; Eketāhuna, New Zealand
- Died: 1978 (aged 87–88)
- Known for: Pottery

Elizabeth Matheson BEM (19 January 1890 – 1978) was a New Zealand potter. Her works are held at the Museum of New Zealand Te Papa Tongarewa and at the Auckland War Memorial Museum. She was awarded the British Empire Medal for services to pottery.

== Biography ==
Matheson was born and grew up in Eketāhuna. She initially trained as a kindergarten teacher but after moving to Havelock North experimented with metal work before settling on creating pottery. In 1930 Matheson took a trip to London and for a very short period trained with Dora Billington. On her return to New Zealand Matheson was taught by Elizabeth Lissaman. She then worked at Te Mata Potteries. For six months between 1939 and 1940 Matheson demonstrated and exhibited her work at the New Zealand Centennial Exhibition alongside Olive Jones. She also exhibited with the New Zealand Academy of Fine Arts. Matheson was a founding member of the New Zealand Society of Potters, and was elected a life member in 1965, together with Olive Jones and Oswold Stephens. Matheson stopped creating pottery in 1975 and died in 1978.

In the 1971 Queen's Birthday Honours, Matheson was awarded the British Empire Medal, for services as a potter.

Her works are held in the Museum of New Zealand Te Papa Tongarewa and the Auckland War Memorial Museum. A retrospective exhibition of Matheson's work, titled A Glorious Uncertainty – Elizabeth Matheson's Life in Art, was held at MTG Hawke's Bay in Napier in 1993. In 2017, works by Matheson were included in an exhibition of early New Zealand female potters, held in West Auckland.

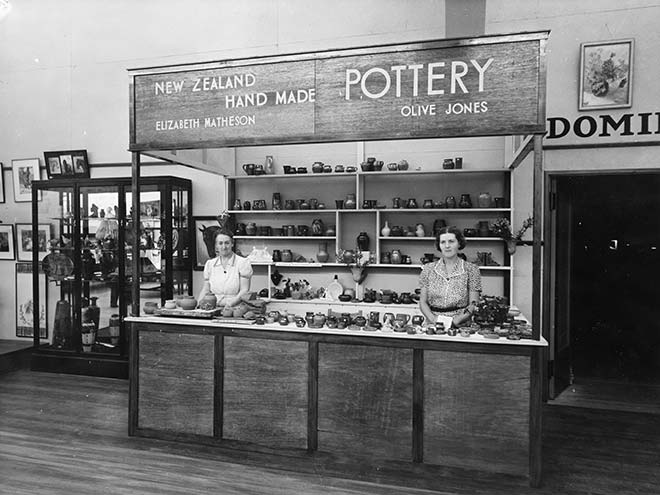
Matheson (left) and Olive Jones at their stall at the Centennial Exhibition in 1940

Matheson's pottery was called "PAKA" and she wrote the name as part of her potter's mark, alongside a figure similar to an envelope with an extra line inside. She worked only with terracotta clay. Her kiln in Havelock North was oil-fired, and was passed on to Helen Mason, whose husband was Matheson's nephew.
