= Jim Cooper (ceramicist) =

New Zealand potter

- Born: 1956 (age 69–70); Westport, New Zealand
- Education: Otago Polytechnic
- Known for: Ceramic art installations
- Notable work: Sgt P; Millbrook Holiday
- Awards: McSkimming Award 1984; Norsewear Art Awards 2006; First Place for Snowy from Cavy; Portage Ceramic Awards 2009, joint winner; Portage Ceramic Awards 2012, Premier Award

Jim Cooper (born 1956) is a New Zealand ceramic artist.

== Life ==
Cooper was born in Westport on the West Coast of New Zealand's South Island in 1956, and attended Buller High School.

He studied ceramics at the Otago Polytechnic School of Art in 1984 and 1989, but did not "get a ticket"; he returned and completed a Masters of Fine Arts there in 1999. Cooper studied under Neil Grant while at Otago Polytechnic and acknowledges him as a mentor.

== Artistic career ==
After graduating, he taught for some time at Otago Polytechnic.

Cooper has worked in ceramics since the early 1980s; his earliest works in 1982 were vessels. He then began creating heads and torsos of free-standing figures and relief sculptures. His works tend to consist of installations of numerous figures, sometimes hundredsa

One of his major works is Sgt P, a ceramic installation loosely inspired by the album art of Sgt. Pepper's Lonely Hearts Club Band by the Beatles. The installation, made up of more than 100 ceramic figures, cardboard cut-outs and drawings, was shown at the Dowse Art Museum in 2007 and then toured to Tauranga, Rotorua and Auckland.

In 2010, Cooper was one of three ceramic artists to take up residency at the Yingge Ceramics Museum to produce work for the 2010 Taiwan Ceramics Biennale. His installation at the Biennale consisted of more than 1,000 pieces. In 2013, he held a residency in Hualien, Eastern Taiwan, as ground breaker with the Taiwan Land Development Corporation.

== Recognition ==
Cooper won the McSkimming Award in 1984. In 1996 he was a finalist in the New Ceramics and Glass Awards. He won first place in the Norsewear Art Awards in 2006 for his work Snowy from Cavy. He was named joint winner of the Portage Ceramic Awards in 2009 and was awarded the Premier Award in 2012 for his 30-piece installation Millbrook Holiday (the League for Spiritual Discovery). He won merit awards in 2016 and 2018.

== Solo Shows ==
- Sgt P. 2007: Dunedin Public Art Gallery.
- Peppermints and Incense. October 2008–February 2009: Dunedin Public Art Gallery.
