= Madeleine Child =

New Zealand ceramicist (born 1959)

- Born: Madeleine Child; 1959 (age 66–67); Sydney, Australia
- Education: Otago Polytechnic (Ceramics), Camberwell School of Art and Craft (Bachelor of Arts, Ceramics), London Royal College of Art (Masters, Ceramics and Glass)
- Known for: Ceramics, teaching

Madeleine Child is a New Zealand ceramicist and teacher. She was born in Sydney in 1959 and moved to New Zealand in 1968.

== Education ==
She holds a Ceramics Certificate from Otago Polytechnic, where she graduated in 1978. She went on to study a Bachelor of Arts (Hons) in Ceramics at Camberwell School of Art and Craft in London in 1990 and in 1992 she graduated from London Royal College of Art with a Masters in Ceramics and Glass. She then went to Central Saint Martin's College of Art in London, enrolling in Advanced Studies (3D) and graduating in 1993.

== Career ==
Child returned to New Zealand in 1994 and began working collaboratively with Philip Jarvis.

Her work has been exhibited widely in New Zealand and internationally, including at the Sarjeant Gallery in Wanganui, Pataka Museum and at the International Ceramics Festival in Mino, Japan. In 2008 her work was included in the Dowse Art Museum exhibition the Magic of Mud, and in 2014 at the Dunedin Public Art Gallery in Sleight of Hand. Her work is included in the collections of Te Papa, the Dowse Art Museum, the Otago Museum, the Auckland War Memorial Museum in New Zealand, and the Frans Hals Museum in the Netherlands.

Madeleine Child taught at the Dunedin School of Art in various roles between 1997 and 2011, including serving as head of school.

== Awards and recognitions ==
Child was a finalist in the Wallace Art Awards in Auckland in 2006–2008, 2011, 2012, and 2014, winning the Jury Award in 2013. She was a finalist in the Dunedin Art Awards in 2011, winning Second Prize, and again in 2013. In 2005, 2008, 2009 and 2012 she was a finalist in the Portage Ceramic Awards, winning a Merit Award in 2008 and the joint Premier Award in 2009.

Other recognition includes the Sidney Myer International Ceramics Premier Award in 2000, the Anthony Harper Contemporary Art Award, Christchurch, and the Gold Coast Ceramic Award.

Child received grants from Creative New Zealand in 1996, 2004, 2009 and 2011.
