= Raewyn Atkinson =

New Zealand ceramicist

- Born: 1955 (age 70–71); Napier, New Zealand
- Known for: Potter, ceramicist
- Website: raewynatkinson.co.nz

Raewyn Atkinson (born 1955) is a New Zealand ceramicist. She completed a Diploma in Early Childhood Education at the Palmerston North Teachers College in 1975 and a Bachelor of Arts in Art History at Victoria University of Wellington in 1998.

Atkinson travelled to Antarctica in 2000 as an Antarctic Arts Fellow under the Artists in Antarctica Programme. She returned to Antarctica independently in 2003. She was awarded the premier prize in the Portage Ceramic Awards in 2004, for works inspired by her time in the Antarctic. She won the Portage premier award again in 2015, and both Portage winning works were exhibited at Te Uru in the survey exhibition Portage 20/20. She was then invited to take the role of judge for the 2021 Portage Ceramic Awards.

Atkinson's work is held in several collections including the Museum of New Zealand Te Papa Tongarewa, The Dowse Art Museum, the Auckland War Memorial Museum, the Los Angeles County Museum of Art and the Museum of Contemporary Ceramic Art in Japan.
