= 1971 Birthday Honours (New Zealand) =

Awards list for New Zealand

The 1971 Queen's Birthday Honours in New Zealand, celebrating the official birthday of Elizabeth II, were appointments made by the Queen on the advice of the New Zealand government to various orders and honours to reward and highlight good works by New Zealanders. They were announced on 12 June 1971.

The recipients of honours are displayed here as they were styled before their new honour.

== Knight Bachelor ==
- Walter Neville Norwood – of Wellington. For outstanding services to commerce.

== Order of Saint Michael and Saint George ==
=== Companion (CMG) ===
- Charles Hilgendorf – of Ashburton. For very valuable services to farming.
- The Most Reverend Norman Alfred Lesser – of Napier. For very valuable services as Primate and Archbishop of New Zealand of the Anglican Church.

== Order of the British Empire ==
=== Knight Commander (KBE) ===
Civil division

- Reginald Harry Smythe – of Auckland. For outstanding services to the forestry industry.

=== Commander (CBE) ===
Civil division

- The Reverend Pakake Heketoro Leonard MBE – of Rotorua. For very valuable services to the community and especially the Māori people.
- Cyril William Mace – of Christchurch. For very valuable services to manufacturing.
- Victor Worth Thomas – of Wellington. For very valuable services as Comptroller of Customs.
- Robert Archibald Whyte – of Paraparaumu. For very valuable services to sport administration especially horse racing.

Military division

- Air Commodore Douglas Fitzclarence St George DFC AFC – Royal New Zealand Air Force.

=== Officer (OBE) ===
Civil division

- Reginald Percy Andrews – of Wanganui. For valuable services as mayor of Wanganui.
- Eric Tamate Beaven – of Christchurch. For valuable services to commerce and tourism.
- Arthur Trevor Campbell. For valuable services as New Zealand Public Relations Officer in London.
- Robert James Charles. For services to sport.
- Geoffrey Noel Townshend Greenbank – of Auckland. For valuable services as headmaster of King's College, Auckland.
- Matthew Graham Blacklock Harvey – of New Plymouth. For valuable services as chairman of the Taranaki Education Board.
- Geoffrey Henry Leslie – of Wellington. For valuable services as director of the Division of Dental Health, Health Department.
- Terence Henderson McCombs – of Christchurch. For valuable services to education.
- David Hedley McElrea – of Milton. For valuable services to the community.
- The Reverend Lawrence Alfred North – of Wellington. For valuable services as a minister of religion.
- Peter John Scott – of Dunedin. For valuable services to the community.
- Mavis Ada Tiller – of Wellington. For valuable services as national president of the National Council of Women.
- Robert Burns Watson MB ChB – of Queenstown. For valuable services as a medical practitioner.

Military division

- Captain Frederick Hardman – Royal New Zealand Navy.
- Lieutenant-Colonel Edward Senior – Corps of Royal New Zealand Engineers (Territorial Force).
- Wing Commander Alfred George Edward Pugh – Royal New Zealand Air Force.
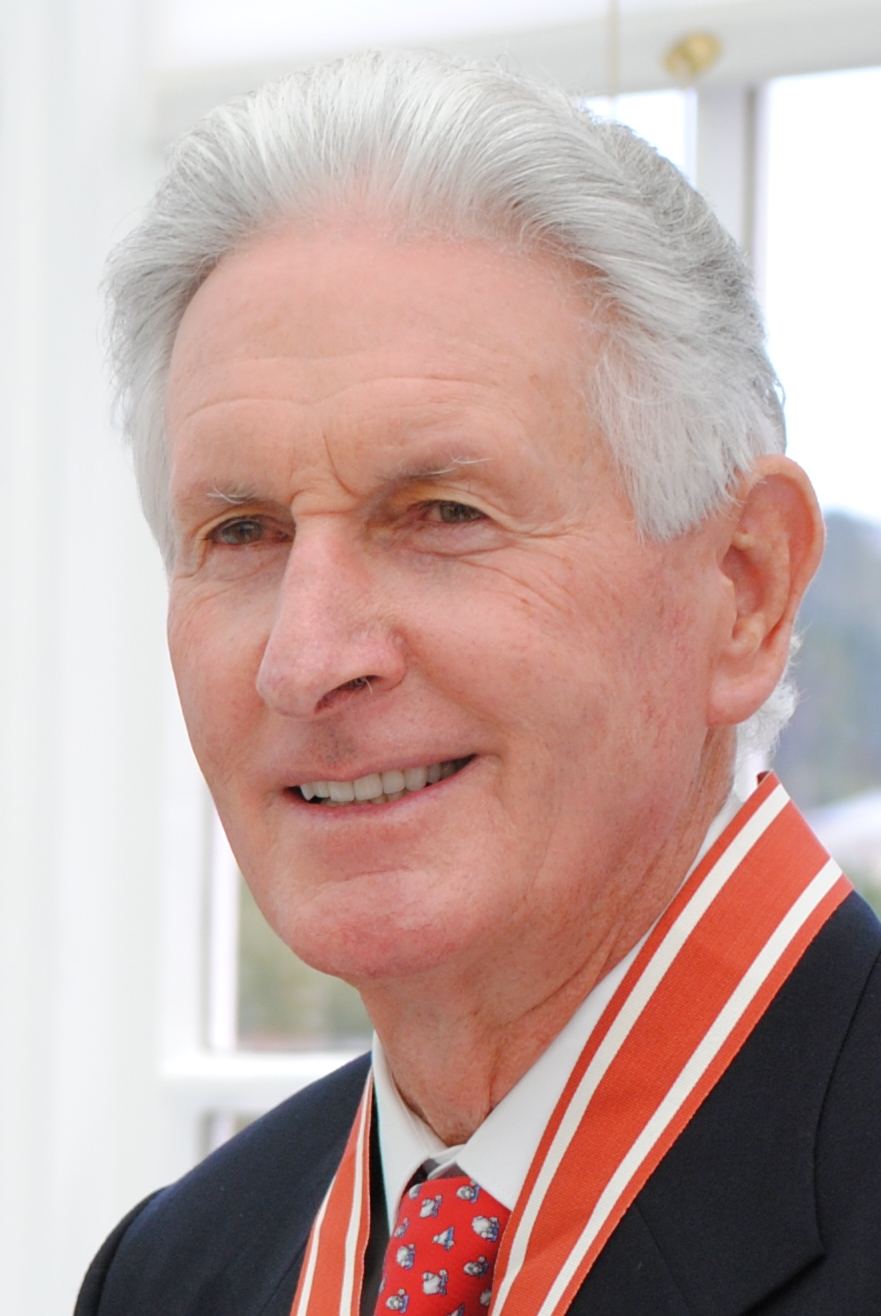
Bob Charles

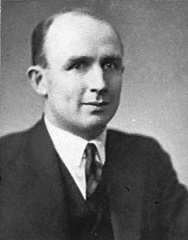
Terry McCombs

=== Member (MBE) ===
Civil division

- Ellen Elizabeth Buckingham – of Invercargill. For services to the community especially as a member of the Southland Education Board.
- John William Byers – of Kaikohe. For services to the community.
- Raymond Malcolm Collis – of Manawatū. For services to local government.
- Doris May Dennis – of Gisborne. For services to the community.
- Elsie Elizabeth Fellingham – of Featherston. For services to the community.
- James Albert Nichols Halford – of Norsewood. For services to the community.
- John Brown Hamilton – of Queenstown. For services to local government.
- Sidney Perrin Harling – of Blenheim. For services as mayor of Blenheim.
- Arthur Reginald Harris – of Mount Maunganui. For services as mayor of Mount Maunganui.
- John Hobson – of Auckland. For services as superintendent of Mount Eden Prison and especially for his exemplary resolution and skill in successfully terminating a prison riot at that prison on 20 March 1971.
- Graeme Laurenson – of New Plymouth. For services to his profession and to the community as an architect.
- David Collingwood Low MD FRACS – of Nelson. For services to the community.
- Archibald James McCallum – of Oamaru. For services to scouting.
- Robert Millen McCulloch – of Auckland. For services as mayor of Mount Wellington.
- Ralph Murrell McDonald – of Mosgiel. For services as mayor of Mosgiel.
- Albert Leonard Sutherland – of Greymouth. For services to the community.
- Conway Wilberforce Teppett – of Palmerston North. For services to the community.
- Heeni Teteira Wharemaru – of Hamilton. For social work among the Māori people of the Waikato.
- Ernest Edwyn Willoughby MD ChB – of Huntly. For services to the community especially as mayor of Huntly.

Military division

- Temporary Lieutenant Commander Brian John Mahoney – Royal New Zealand Navy.
- Warrant Officer Second Class Joseph Gormanly – Royal New Zealand Corps of Signals (Regular Force).
- Major Molly Lois Moore – New Zealand Women's Royal Army Corps (Regular Force).
- Warrant Officer Second Class (Temporary Warrant Officer First Class) Leslie George Stanton – Royal New Zealand Infantry Regiment (Territorial Force).
- Squadron Leader John Alan Scrimshaw, AFC – Royal New Zealand Air Force.

== Companion of the Imperial Service Order (ISO) ==
- John Bruce Brown – of Wellington. For valuable services as Valuer-General.

== British Empire Medal (BEM) ==
Civil division

- Andrew Robert Michael Bowie – of Hanmer. For services as a mountain guide.
- Herbert Wedgwood Brabant – of Whakatāne. For services to those at sea by the operation of a shore wireless station.
- Joyce Brabant – of Whakatāne. For services to those at sea by the operation of a shore wireless station.
- Mary Constance Burrell – of Hastings. For services to the aged.
- Sidney Keith Christensen – of Taupō. For services to the community.
- Henry Willoughby Hampton – of Chatham Islands. For services to the community as a police constable.
- Albert Cyril Loach – of Christchurch. For services to the community.
- Hector George McAllister – of Kaiapoi. For services to the community as a chief fire officer.
- Grace McNaught – of Te Kūiti. For services to the community.
- Elizabeth Matheson – of Wellington. For services as a potter.
- Amy Marion Ryan – of Auckland. For services to nursing.
- Patricia Helene Pamela Simcox – of Hawke's Bay. For services to the community.
- Gordon Day Staveley – of Wellington. For services as a prison officer.
- Athol Gladwyn Wood – of Papakura. For services to farming.

Military division, for gallantry

- Marine Engineering Artificer Third Class Graeme Stewart Holmes – Royal New Zealand Navy. For courage and devotion to duty during a fire in the engine room of HMNZS Waikato.
- Marine Engineering Mechanician First Class Stephen Howarth – Royal New Zealand Navy. For courage and devotion to duty during a fire in the engine room of HMNZS Waikato.

Military division

- Chief Electrician Edward Dawson – Royal New Zealand Navy.
- Sergeant (Temporary Staff Sergeant) Frederic Donald Barclay – Royal New Zealand Infantry Regiment (Regular Force).
- Flight Sergeant David Karl – Royal New Zealand Air Force.
- Sergeant Alexander Allan McEwan – Royal New Zealand Air Force.

== Air Force Cross (AFC) ==
- Squadron Leader Gerrard Clive Brown – Royal New Zealand Air Force.

== Royal Red Cross ==
=== Associate (ARRC) ===
- Matron Marjorie Edith Traill – Royal New Zealand Nursing Corps (Regular Force).

== Queen's Police Medal (QPM) ==
- Robert Alexander Moore – chief superintendent, New Zealand Police Force.

== Queen's Commendation for Brave Conduct ==
- Engineering Mechanic First Class Rick Rivas Ormsby – Royal New Zealand Navy. For courage shown during a fire in the engine room of HMNZS Waikato.
- Leading Engineering Mechanic Bernard Charles Shearsby – Royal New Zealand Navy. For courage shown during a fire in the engine room of HMNZS Waikato.
