= Kate Fitzharris =

Potter in New Zealand

- Education: Otago Polytechnic
- Awards: Portage Ceramic Merit Award 2002, 2010, 2014; Doris Lusk Ceramics Residency 2017; Tylee Cottage Residency; Shigaraki Ceramic Cultural Park residency

Kate Fitzharris (born 1974) is a New Zealand ceramicist. She is mostly known for her doll-like figures, and although working primarily in ceramics, also incorporates found materials. She has won three Portage Ceramic Merit Awards, and has held the Doris Lusk Residency, the Tylee Cottage Residency and a residency at Shigaraki Ceramic Cultural Park in Japan.

== Education ==
Fitzharris was born in Wellington in 1974 and is based in Waitati, outside Dunedin in the South Island of New Zealand. She works part-time as a librarian. Fitzharris graduated with a Bachelor of Fine Arts with a major in ceramics from the Otago Polytechnic School of Art.

== Career ==
Fitzharris is mostly known for her handbuilt doll-like figures, and although working primarily in ceramics also incorporates found materials.

Fitzharris won Merit Awards at the Portage Ceramic Awards in 2002, 2010 and 2014. She also won the People's Choice Award at the New Zealand Potters exhibition in 2010.

In 2011, Fitzharris had an exhibition called "Walk" at the Blue Oyster Art Project Space in Dunedin. Fitzharris mostly works in ceramics, but for Walk she travelled by foot from her home in Waitati to the gallery in central Dunedin, using beeswax to make small beads as she went, and incorporating found materials.

In 2017, Fitzharris won the Doris Lusk Ceramics Residency.

Fitzharris won a Tylee Cottage Residency in 2018, during which she invited local residents to share significant ceramic pieces with her, to create a "library of things" for her to respond to with her own work. The resulting exhibition "things don't end at their edges" was shown at the Serjeant Gallery from March to June 2019.

Fitzharris spent much of 2019 as artist in residence at Shigaraki Ceramic Cultural Park in Japan, exploring traditional Japanese ceramic techniques and finishes. She was also a finalist for the Wallace Arts Trust Awards in 2019.

Her work is held in the collections of the Shigaraki Ceramic Cultural Park Foundation, the Dowse Art Museum, the James Wallace Arts Trust, and the Waikato Museum.

== Exhibitions ==
Some of Fitzharris's exhibitions include:

- "Walk" at Blue Oyster Project Art Space in 2011.
- "Things Don't End at Their Edges", 16 March – 9 June 2019.
- "New Familiar’’ at the RDS Gallery in Dunedin in 2020.

== Personal life ==
Fitzharris is married with two children.
