= Oswold Stephens =

New Zealand teacher, chemist, and potter

Oswold Counsell Stephens (11 December 1896 – 8 May 1980) was a notable New Zealand teacher, chemist and potter. He was born in Dunedin, New Zealand in 1896. He was elected a life member of the New Zealand Society of Potters in 1965, together with Elizabeth Matheson and Olive Jones.
