= Portage Ceramic Awards =

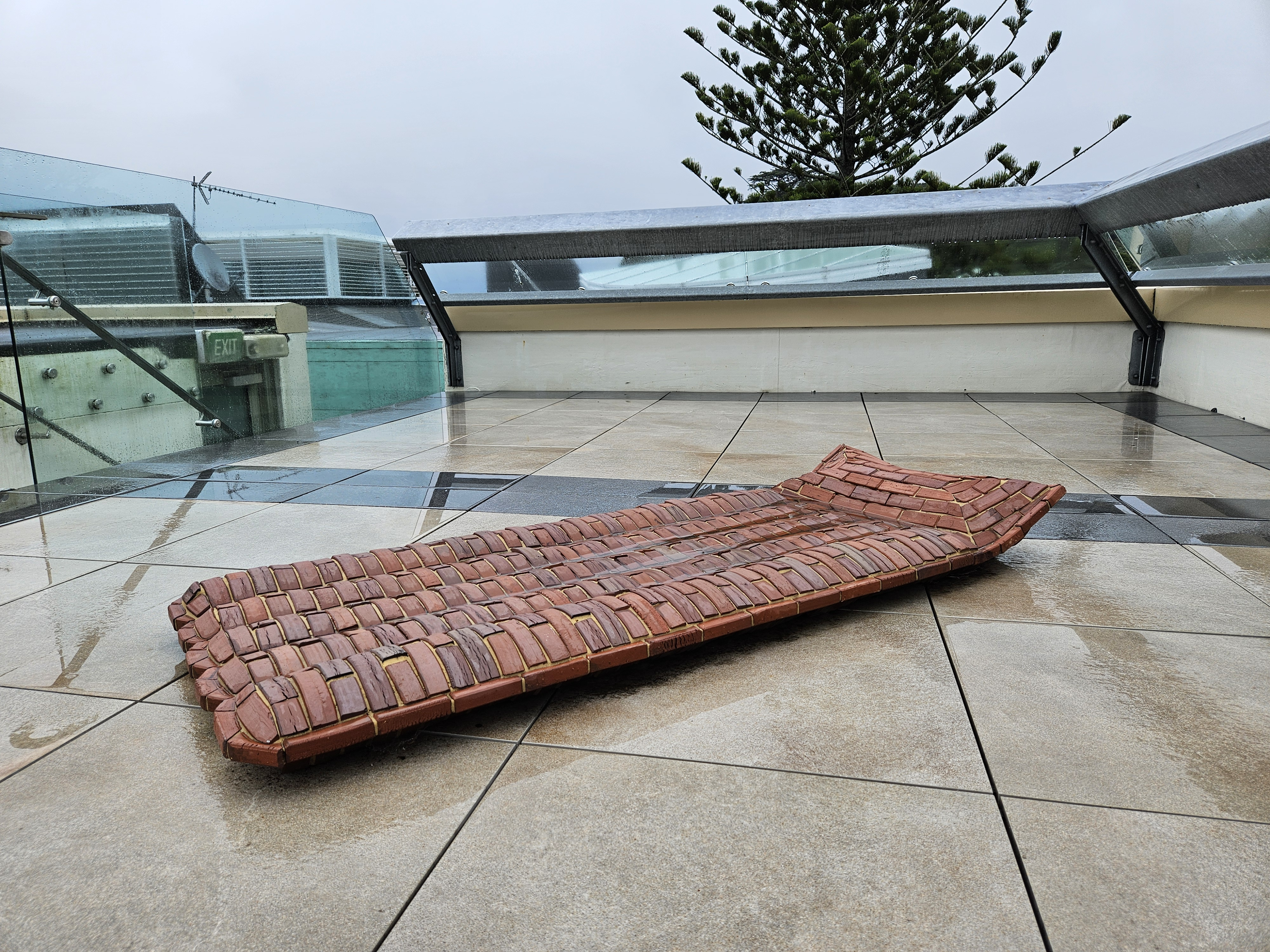
Lilo by Peter Lange, winner of the 2006 Portage Ceramic Awards, on permanent display at the Lopdell House

The annual Portage Ceramic Awards is New Zealand's premier ceramics event. Established in 2001, the awards are funded by The Trusts Charitable Foundation and administered by Te Uru Waitākere Contemporary Gallery (formerly Lopdell House Gallery). A national award, the Portage Ceramics Awards also acknowledge West Auckland's long history of ceramic practice, dating back to 1852.

== The competition ==
Entry is available to artists of New Zealand citizenship. The annual awards are judged each year by a different international judge, usually from the field of ceramics. An open call is made for entries, and since the third award onwards the judge has selected a group of finalists for exhibition. An exhibition is held at Te Uru and a publication produced. In 2020, due to complications from the Covid-19 pandemic, a survey exhibition of previous winners titled Portage 20/20 was presented in lieu of a competition.

== Residencies ==
In 2013 two international residencies were announced as part of the awards: the Guldagergaard residency in Skaelskor, Denmark, awarded to Richard Stratton and a residency in Medalta, Medicine Hat, Canada, awarded to Melissa Ford.

In 2014 a workshop scholarship to the Peters Valley School of Craft in New Jersey was awarded to Chris Weaver.

== Award winners ==
Judges and winners of the Portage Ceramic Awards
Year	Judge	Premier award	Residency award	Merit or other award
2001	Mitsuo Shoji	Tony Bond, Qumbilicums		Merit award: Chris Weaver; Waitākere artist award: Ted Dutch
2002	Michael Keighery	Richard Parker, Signals		Merit award: Kate Fitzharris; Waitākere artist award: Sanderson Kindleysides; Emergent artist award: Aidan Howse
2003	Julie Bartholomew	Penny Ericson, Six Days in a Southern Landscape		Merit award: Ann Verdcourt; Waitākere artist award: Susannah Bridges; Emergent artist award: Amanda Shanley
2004	Patsy Hely	Raewyn Atkinson, Cape Evans 2		Merit award: John Roy; Waitākere artist award: Danny Rowlandson; Emergent artist award: Aya Sato
2005	Robert Bell	Merilyn Wiseman, Arctic Rim		Merit award: Helen Yau; Waitākere artist award: Claire Barton; Emergent artist award: Phillipa Durkin
2006	Bill Samuels	Peter Lange, Lilo		Merit awards: Owen Bartlett, Mark Mitchell; Waitākere artist award: Danny Rowlandson
2007	Jeff Shapiro	DeAnne Lawford-Smith, Keeping Quiet and Heart of Glass		Merit awards: Greg Barron, Tim Holman, Katherine Smyth, Onlie Ong; Waitākere artist award: John Parker
2008	Grace Cochrane	Matt McLean, Scaled Heights		Merit awards: Madeleine Child, Philipa Durkin, Tim Holman, Michael Michaels, Richard Parker, Helen Yau; Waitākere artist award: Sang Sool Shim & Keum Sun Lee
2009	Scott Chamberlin	Joint winners: Madeleine Child & Philip Jarvis, Doodads & Doodahs and Widespread Occurrence of Possible Symbioses / Jim Cooper, Drug Jars and Vendor		Merit awards: Phillipa Durkin, Emily Siddell, Kristy Palleson; Waitākere artist awards: Sang Sool Shim & Keum Sun Lee, John Parker
2010	Stephen Bowers	Kirsty Gardiner, Secrets A Jar		Merit awards: Greg Barron, Georgina Caulton, Kate Fitzharris, Melissa Ford, Rhonda Jameson, Duncan Shearer
2011	Janet Mansfield	Bridie Henderson, Feathers		Second prize: Chris Weaver; Merit awards: Brendan Adams, Maureen Allison, Kirsty Gardiner, Cheryl Oliver
2012	Paul Scott	Jim Cooper, Millbrook Holiday (the league for spiritual discovery)		Merit awards: Kate McLean, Fran Maguire
2013	Amy Gogarty	Robert Rapson, Himalaya Serves The World 1949 - Early 70s	Mel Ford, Richard Stratton	Merit awards: Marita Hewitt, Kim Henderson, Jane McCulla
2014	Takeshi Yasuda	Louise Rive, The Space Between	Chris Weaver	Merit awards: Kate Fitzharris, Madeleine Child, Duncan Shearer, Frank Checketts
2015	Ingrid Murphy	Raewyn Atkinson, Wasters III (Accumulate)	John Parker	Merit awards: Virginia Leonard, Paul Maseyk
2016	Janet DeBoos	Caroline Earley, Clinch VI	Greg Barron	Merit awards: Susannah Bridges, Jim Cooper, Mark Goody & Emily Siddell
2017	Emma Bugden	Richard Stratton, Forced Turn Teapot	Andrea du Chatenier	Merit awards: Cheryl Lucas, John Parker, Amanda Shanley
2018	Bari Ziperstein	Sang-Sool Shim and Keum-Sun Lee, In the Beautiful Dream		Merit Awards: Jim Cooper, Andrea du Chatenier, and Rick Rudd; honourable mention: Brendan Adams, Jinho Jeong, Peter Lange, John Roy and Susan St Lawrence
2019	Merran Esson	Mark Mitchell, Slice		Merit awards: Blue Black, Kylie Matheson; honourable mention: Aaron Scythe, Sang-Sool Shim and Keum-Sun Lee
2021	Raewyn Atkinson	Teresa Peters, ECHOES		Merit awards: Fiona Jack, Andrea du Chatenier
2022	Karl Chitham	Richard Penn, Artefacts		Second: Helen Perrett; Merit awards: Evelyn Hodowany, Elena Renker, Dorothy Waetford
2023	John Parker	Jino Jeong, Celestial Thread		Merit awards: Yueh Luo, Debbie Barber
2024	Kate Newby	Wendelien Bakker, Sea of Grass		Merit awards: Raukura Turei, Terry Bell, Ted Kindleysides
2025	Fiona Jack	Scott Brough, Four-sided Bottle		Merit awards: Jess Nicholson, Jamie Jenkins, Maak Bow
