= Merilyn Wiseman =

New Zealand potter (1941–2019)

- Born: 25 October 1941
- Died: 13 June 2019 (aged 77)
- Education: Elam School of Art; Goldsmiths School of Art
- Known for: Pottery

Merilyn Wiseman (25 October 1941 – 13 June 2019) was a New Zealand potter.

== Education ==
Wiseman graduated from Elam School of Art in Auckland with a Preliminary Diploma in 1959. In 1963 she graduated from Goldsmiths School of Art in London with a National Diploma in design, gaining an Art Specialist Teachers Diploma the following year.

== Career ==
Wiseman has been working as a professional ceramicist since the mid 1970s. She became interested in working with clay while on a working holiday at a small pottery in Ireland; she returned to New Zealand and built a wood-fired kiln near Albany in 1976. She recalls

I was a complete novice but with constant reference to A Potter's Book and persistent telephone calls to generous long-suffering established potters such as Ian Smail, Warren Tippett and many others, I started potting.

In 1988 she contributed the following statement to Profiles: 24 New Zealand Potters:

I have been involved with clay for about ten years, spending the first few years learning to throw, discover suitable glazes, and to fire my wood kiln.

Gradually I became more and more interested in hand-building, playing around with forms which I could not throw in the wheel. It has been a slow process, teaching myself new techniques only because that was the way to solve problems and give form to the concept – a very satisfying way of learning about clay. Hand-building cannot be hurried and allows time to work intuitively.

... Changes and developments in my work have become gradual, new ideas forming while I am working with clay rather than from some intellectual exercise outside the work

Wiseman's early work reflected the contemporaneous interest Japanese ceramics spread in New Zealand by influential English figures including Bernard Leach, but she quickly came to develop her own style. Her mature work is characterised by curvaceous and sensuous shapes, influenced by forms found in nature, and colours she creates through mixing glazes to match her needs.

== Recognitions ==
In 2007 Wisemen was recognised with an Arts Foundation of New Zealand Laureate Award. Other awards include the 1984 Premier Award at the Fletcher Challenge Pottery Awards and the 2005 Premier Award at the Portage Ceramic Awards. She has received three creative development grants from the QEII Arts Council.

In 2002 one of Wiseman's works, Pacific Rim, was featured in a special edition of stamps called 'Art Meets Craft' issued by New Zealand Post and Sweden Post.

== Collections ==
Her work is held in the Museum of New Zealand Te Papa Tongarewa, the Christchurch Art Gallery, The Dowse Art Museum, Auckland War Memorial Museum, Canterbury Museum and Taipei Fine Arts Museum.
