= Margaret Milne =

New Zealand potter (1917–2005)

Margaret Milne (née Quigley, 21 May 1917 – 16 February 2005) was a New Zealand potter.

== Early life and family ==
She was born in New Zealand in 1917. In 1936 she married electrical engineer Mitchell "Mick" Milne in the Auckland suburb of Parnell.

== Pottery career ==
Taught by potter Patricia Perrin, Milne began pottery making at the age of 40. She worked largely with earthenware, stoneware and the Japanese Raku technique.

In an interview with Doreen Blumhardt and Brian Brake, Milne said, "I feel I’m one who simply drifted into a potter’s world, without any aim or direction, other than a general interest in craft work...I believe strongly in technique, because of the disciplines necessary for competent craftsmanship, but I just can’t work to a set plan or design. Only to an idea".

In the 1960s, she formed Waterford Potters with Guy and Jocelyn Mountain, establishing a studio in Remuera in the 1970s. Milne was also an early member of 12 Potters, an Auckland-based pottery co-operative.

She spent some time working and travelling in Japan and maintained a close relationship with Japanese potter Takeichi Kawai.

She has exhibited with the New Zealand Academy of Fine Arts and The Group.

== Further sources ==
- Cathy Kenkel, Margaret Milne: Two Hands, Craft New Zealand 41, Spring 1992
