= Chester Nealie =

New Zealand potter and teacher

Chester Nealie (born 1942) is a New Zealand-born potter and teacher. In 1991 he moved to Australia.

== Early life and education ==
Nealie was born in Rotorua in 1942. In 1963 he graduated from Auckland Secondary Teachers College and began practicing pottery, taught by potters Shoji Hamada, Takeichi Kawai and Michael Cardew. Between 1972 and 1975 he became a ceramics lecturer at North Shore Teachers College.

== Work and career ==
Nealie began working with salt-glaze ceramics: he built his first anagama kiln in 1978, after visiting Japan. He has gone on to research and work with wood firing in Japan, Korea, China, the United States, Norway, Burma, Bangladesh and South Africa.

His work in this form, and working relationship with Australian potter Owen Rye, has been described by ceramic historian Janet Mansfield as 'a significant force and impetus for anagama and wood firing in Australia'.

The act of gathering and collecting artefacts is influential in his work. Nealie has said

Digging up old bottles, collecting scraps of weathered driftwood from the mangrove swamps or absorbing visual delights in fossils and artefacts in musky museums are often stimuli behind my work. My shapes are a synthesis of an emotional link I feel with past objects and the accidental play with clay in its making. I like to use a slow turning wheel with a minimum of water so that all honest marks of making remain to be seen.

In 1982 and 1987 Nealie was awarded the Premier Award at the Fletcher Challenge Ceramics Award. In 1988 he curated the New Zealand Expo Pavilion in Brisbane. In 1992, he was a member of the Artists in the Sub-Antarctic expedition to the Auckland Islands and was featured in the Treasures of the Underworld exhibition at the Seville World Expo. In 1993 he became a research fellow at Monash University.

== Collections ==
Nealie's work is held in the collections of the Museum of New Zealand Te Papa Tongarewa, the Auckland War Memorial Museum, Otago Museum, Powerhouse Museum, and the Shepparton Art Gallery in Australia.
