= Doreen Blumhardt =

New Zealand potter (1914–2009)

Dame Doreen Blumhardt ONZ DNZM CBE
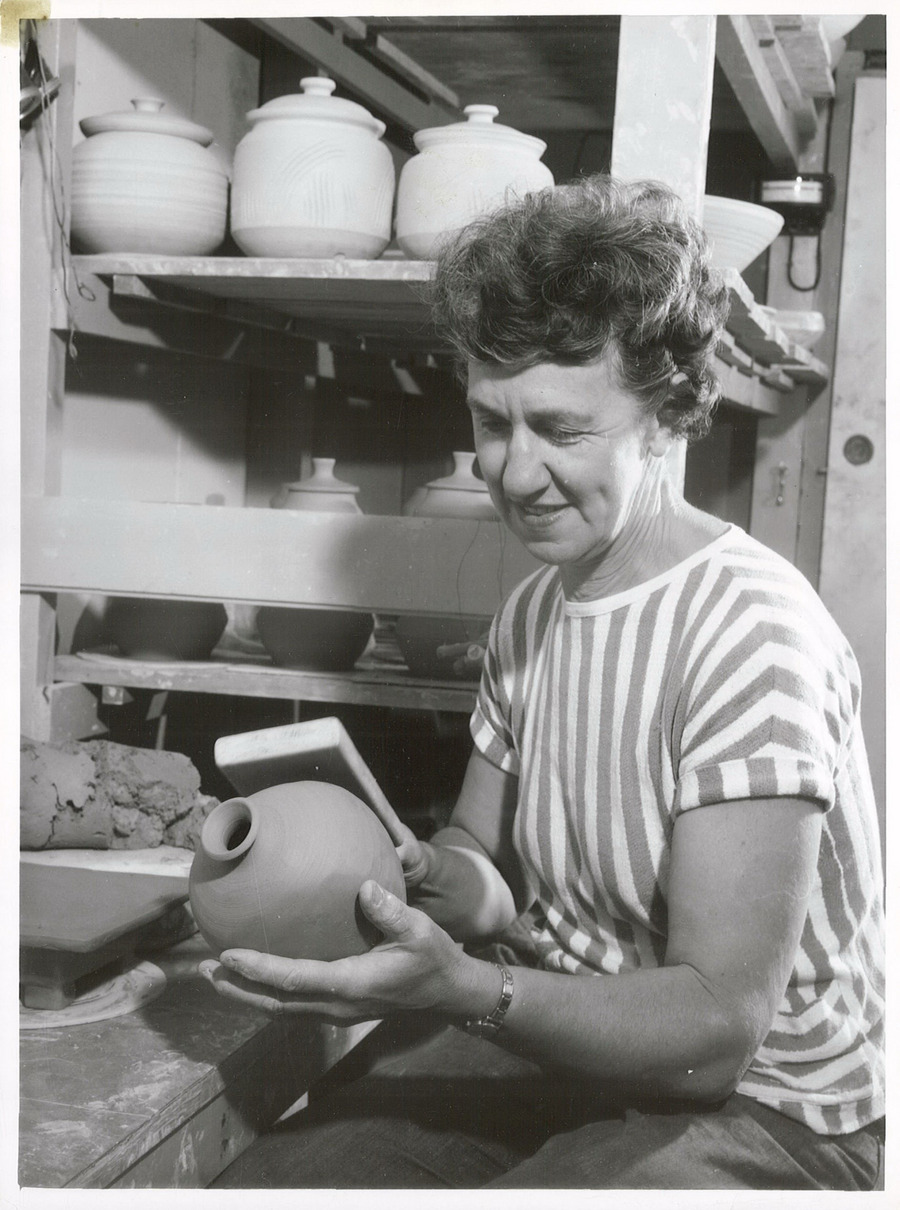
- Born: Vera Doreen Blumhardt; 7 March 1914; Whangārei, New Zealand
- Died: 17 October 2009 (aged 95); Wellington, New Zealand
- Known for: Pottery, education, publishing

Dame Vera Doreen Blumhardt ONZ DNZM CBE (7 March 1914 – 17 October 2009) was a New Zealand potter, ceramicist and arts educator.

== Early life ==
Vera Doreen Blumhardt was born on 7 March 1914 in Huanui in the north of New Zealand. Her parents were German-born David Blumhardt and Wilhelmina Elisabeth Magdalene Hartdegen who ran a small farm near Whangārei.

Blumhardt attended Whangarei High School and studied the violin. She had a keen interest in drawing and watercolours and went on to study at the Canterbury College of Art in Christchurch. From 1937, she attended a teacher training programme at Christchurch Teachers' Training College and studied German and education at Canterbury University College.

== Career ==
in 1940, Blumhardt began her teaching career at Nelson Central School. After acting as interim head of the art department at the Christchurch Teachers' Training College, Blumhardt took up the newly created position of National Art and Craft Adviser to implement an arts and craft programme for primary schools in New Zealand. In this role, she developed a national teacher training course and travelled to Europe to develop as an arts educator, attending at the UNESCO arts and crafts education conference in Paris and staying at the Brighton College of Art. In 1951, Blumhardt was appointed the head of the Art Department of Wellington College of Education, a position she held for over 20 years.

In the 1950s, in addition to her works in watercolour, printing and weaving, Blumhardt developed an interest in ceramics, experimenting with different methods and becoming a prominent member of the New Zealand Society of Potters.

After she retired, Blumhardt focused on her pottery career, holding her first solo exhibition at the Dowse Gallery. In 1957, she participated in New Zealand's first national pottery exhibition along with fifteen other potters. Blumhardt's works are included in many overseas galleries and institutions, including the Victoria and Albert Museum in London and the Museo Gaccia in Switzerland as well as in her home nation of New Zealand. A retrospective of her works was displayed at the New Zealand Academy of Fine Arts in 1991.

In the 1970s, Blumhardt took up writing; she collaborated with Brian Brake on New Zealand Potters: Their Work and Words (1976) and Craft New Zealand, the Art of the Craftsman (1981), the latter won the Watties Book of the Year award. Blumhardt also founded and ran the New Zealand Potter magazine together with Helen Mason.

Blumhardt travelled extensively and collected pottery from countries including Japan and Mexico. She was instrumental to international potters including Takeichi Kawai and Bernard Leach exhibiting in New Zealand.

In later years, Blumhardt completed a series of large commissions, including the Richard Byrd Memorial in Wellington in 1992, the tiles of which depict the Aurora Australis.

== Blumhardt Foundation ==
In 2003, Blumhardt founded the Blumhardt Foundation to foster, support, collect, and display the best examples of decorative arts and design in New Zealand. Every year, the Foundation, The Dowse Art Museum, and Creative New Zealand offer a Cultural Internship, providing opportunities for artists to nurture curatorial interest and expertise in the areas of decorative arts and design.

== Honours ==
In the 1981 New Year Honours, Blumhardt was appointed a Commander of the Order of the British Empire, for services to art, especially pottery. In the same year, she was elected a fellow of the Royal Society of Arts in London. Ten years later she was awarded an honorary doctorate in literature by Victoria University of Wellington. In 2003, Blumhardt received a Distinguished Companion of the New Zealand Order of Merit for services to pottery and art education. She was made a Member of the Order of New Zealand in the 2007 New Year Honours.

In 2009, two months before her death, Blumhardt accepted the redesigned title of Dame Companion of the New Zealand Order of Merit following the restoration of titular honours by the New Zealand government.

== Death ==
Dame Vera Doreen Blumhardt died on 17 October 2009, aged 95.

== Publications ==
- Blumhardt D, (1976): New Zealand potters : their work and words, Wellington, Reed
- Blumhardt D., Brake B. (1981): Craft New Zealand : the art of the craftsman, New York, Universe
- Blumhardt D. (1991): Education through art, Wellington, Wellington College of Education
- McLeod M., Brake B.; Bumhardt D. (1991): Doreen Blumhardt: teacher & potter, Wellington, Daphne Brasell Associates Press
