= Olive Jones =

New Zealand potter (1893–1982)

Olive Emily Jones (20 June 1893 – 26 December 1982) was a New Zealand potter.

== Biography ==
Jones was born in Onehunga, Auckland, New Zealand, on 20 June 1893.

== Career ==
Jones was elected a life member of the New Zealand Society of Potters in 1965, together with Elizabeth Matheson and Oswold Stephens. For six months between 1939 and 1940 Jones demonstrated and exhibited her work at the New Zealand Centennial Exhibition .

She exhibited with the Christchurch-based art association, The Group, in 1950.

Her works are held in Museum of New Zealand Te Papa Tongarewa, MTG Hawke's Bay and Auckland War Memorial Museum.

In 2017, works by Jones were included in an exhibition of early New Zealand female potters, held in West Auckland.
