= Janet Mansfield =

Australian potter, publisher and author

Janet Mansfield OAM
- Born: 19 August 1934; Sydney, New South Wales, Australia
- Died: 4 February 2013 (aged 78); Mudgee, New South Wales, Australia
- Known for: Salt glazed ceramics

Janet Mansfield OAM (19 August 1934 – 4 February 2013) was an Australian potter known for her salt glazed works. She was also a publisher and author.

== Early life and education ==
Mansfield was born in 1934 in Sydney, Australia. She trained at the National Art School, Sydney in 1964–65, and studied salt glazing in Japan.

== Career ==
Mansfield moved with her family to Gulgong in 1977, establishing an anagama wood-fired kiln and producing salt-glazed ware using local clay.

Mansfield held more than 35 solo exhibitions in Australia and internationally, including in Japan and New Zealand, and numerous group exhibitions in many countries. She established and ran the Ceramic Art Gallery in Paddington, Sydney.

Mansfield was an editor of Pottery in Australia (now called Journal of Australian Ceramics) from 1976 to 1989. She later founded her own magazines, first Ceramics: Art and Perception in 1990 and then Ceramics Technical in 1995. After passing these magazines on to Elaine Olafson Henry in 2008, she founded Mansfield Press, publishing a number of ceramics books. Mansfield also wrote a number of ceramics books, including Pottery (1986), A collector's guide to modern Australian ceramics (1988), Salt-glaze ceramics: an international perspective (1991), Contemporary ceramic art: in Australia and New Zealand (1995), Ceramics in the environment: an international review (2005). In addition, she edited a number of directories and guides for ceramicists.

From 1981, Mansfield was a member of the International Academy of Ceramics, and was then president from 2006 to 2012. She judged for the Portage Ceramic Awards and the Fletcher Challenge Ceramic Exhibition.

Mansfield organised nine triennial international ceramic events in her home town of Gulgong, although the last of these, ClayPush, took place in April/May 2013, after her death. Master presenters at the events include Mike O'Donnell, Peter Lange, Royce McGlashen and Ross Mitchell-Anyon.

== Awards and honours ==
Mansfield was awarded the Medal of the Order of Australia in 1987. Her work is represented in museum collections around the world, including the Australian National Gallery, and museums in the United States, Hungary, Japan, Britain, New Zealand, Canada, Norway, Czech Republic, Germany, Switzerland and China.

== Death ==
Mansfield died on 4 February 2013 at Mudgee in New South Wales.
