= Peter Lange (ceramicist) =

New Zealand ceramicist

Peter Lange MNZM
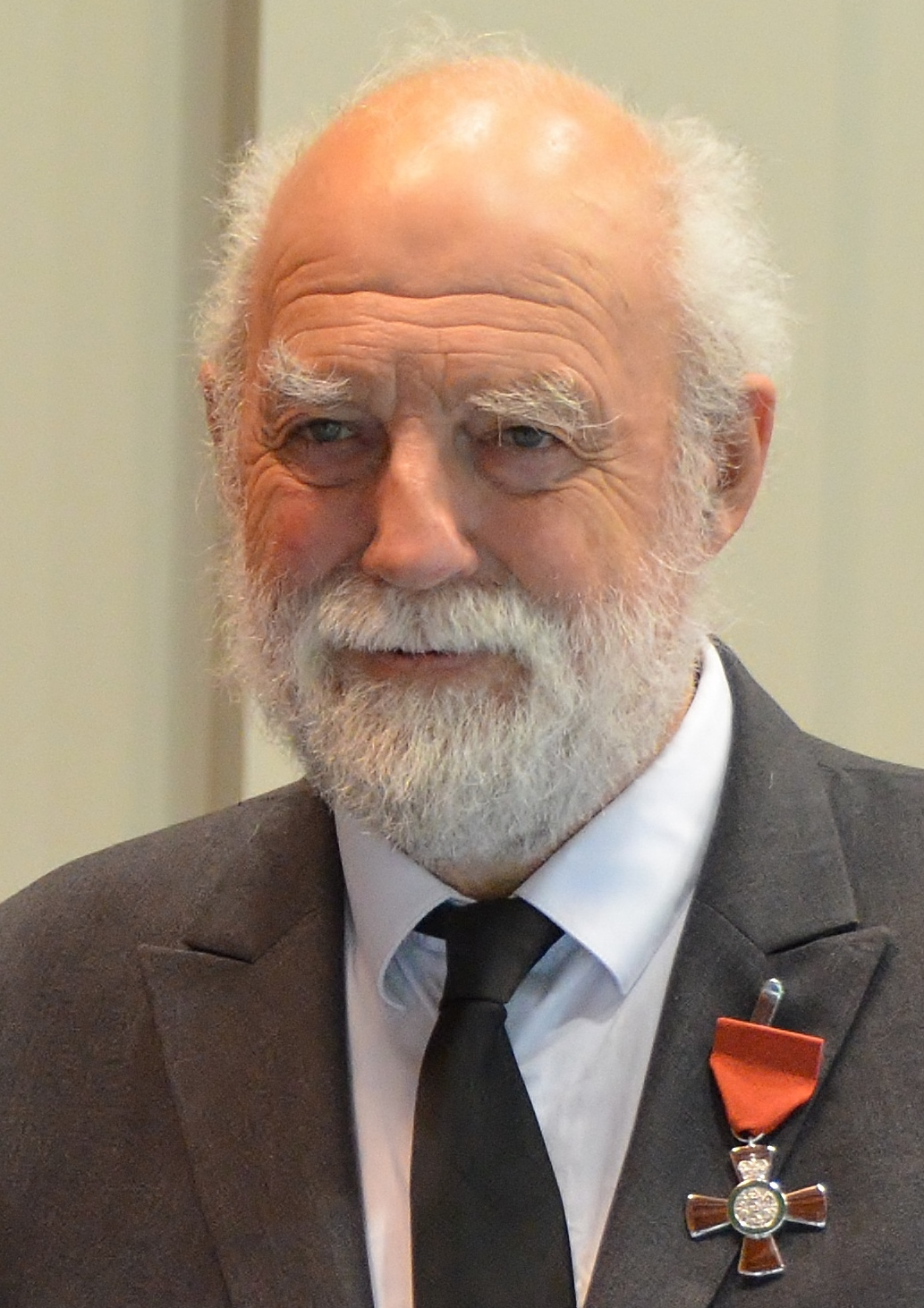
- Lange in 2016
- Born: Peter Reid Lange; 6 September 1944 (age 80); Ōtāhuhu, New Zealand
- Known for: Ceramics
- Children: 3
- Relatives: David Lange (brother)

Peter Reid Lange MNZM (born 6 September 1944) is a New Zealand ceramicist.

== Biography ==
Lange was one of twins (the other a girl) born to Phoebe Fysh Lange (née Reid) and Eric Roy Lange, a medical practitioner, in Ōtāhuhu on 6 September 1944. His older brother was David Lange, who served as the prime minister of New Zealand from 1984 to 1989.

Since the 1980s, Lange has been a leading figure in the New Zealand ceramics and pottery scene. As Dan Chapell writes: "In the case of his brick sculptures, there's a surprising sense of lightness and 'user-friendliness' that belies the material he's used". Alistar Carruthers states of Lange: "He is a risk-taker with an ability to engage people in the ideas he works with in his practice. His wit and imagination are always manifest in his work."

He was married to Rosemary Lange, and has three children.

== Recognition ==
In the 2016 New Year Honours, Lange was appointed a Member of the New Zealand Order of Merit for services to ceramic arts.

Lange's work is in the collections of the Auckland War Memorial Museum, Christchurch Art Gallery, Beehive (New Zealand), Suzhou School of Art in China, and the Aberystwyth Arts Centre in Wales.

- 2006 Winner of the Premier Award in Portage Ceramic Awards
- 2005 Recipient of the Creative New Zealand Craft/Object Art Fellowship.
- 1997–2008 Director of Auckland Studio Potters Teaching Association
- 1986 Merit Award Winner, Fletcher Challenge Ceramics Awards
- 1984 Merit Award Winner, Fletcher Challenge International Awards

== Selected works ==
- 2013 Tahuri, Three large kumara installed in Mt Eden village.
- 2012 Reading Room Objectspace Auckland
- 2011 Tokens from the Game Public sculptures installed in Todd Triangle, New Lynn, West Auckland.
- 2011 Brick, public sculpture installed in New Lynn, West Auckland.
- 2002 Anagama the world's first floating brick boat which took her maiden voyage in Auckland viaduct Basin.
- 2009 Sculpture on the Peninsular, Banks Peninsular
- 1996 Peter Lange, McDougall Gallery, Christchurch
- 1995 Five Hard Pieces, McDougall Art Gallery, Christchurch
- 1989 Figuring Out The Land, RKS Art, Auckland
- 1989 Lucky 13, The Dowse Art Museum Lower Hutt
- 1980s 'Release Mandela' mug, set of 300

== Gallery ==
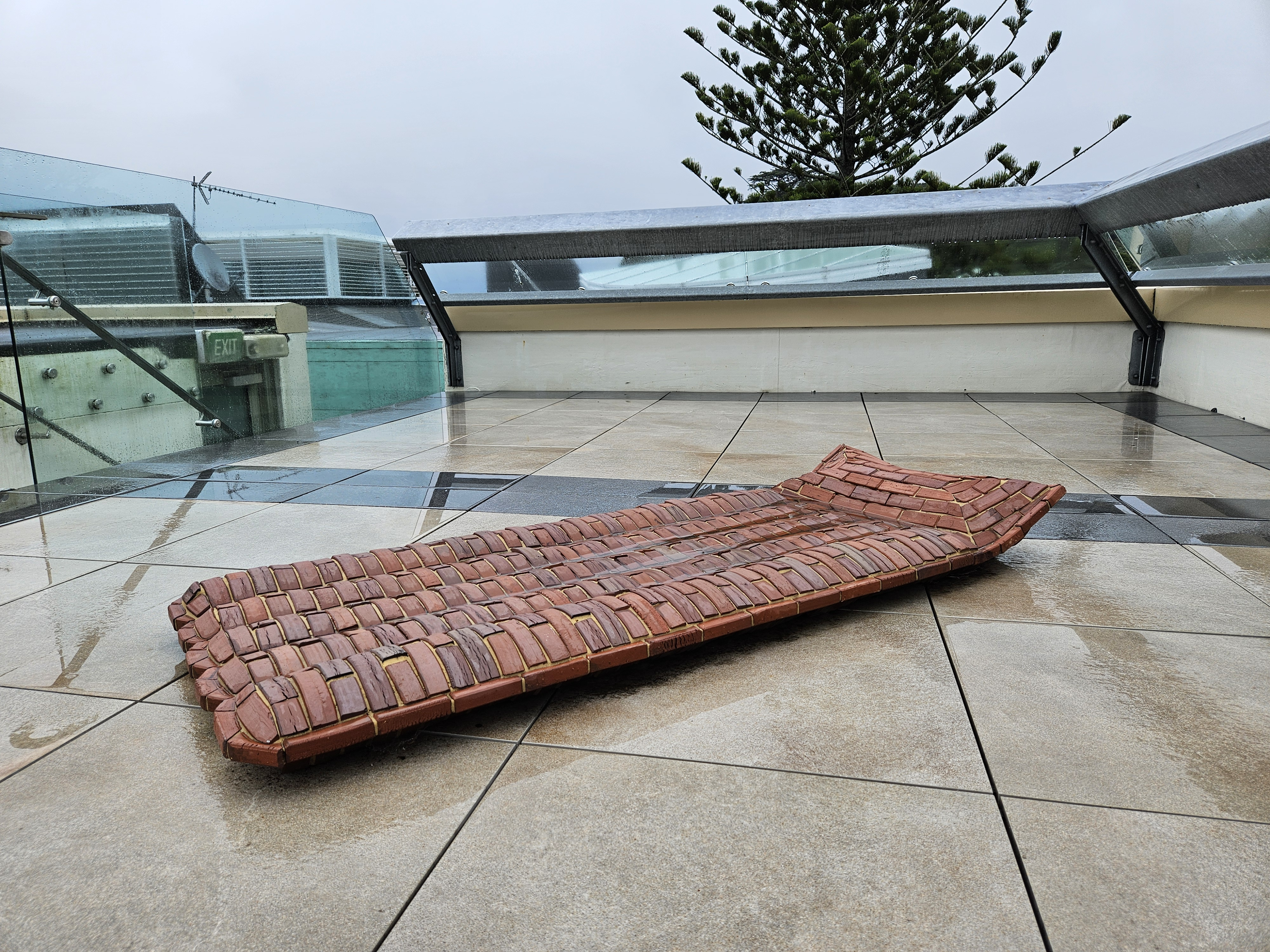
Lilo (2006), the Portage Ceramic Awards Premier Award winning artwork, located on the roof of Lopdell House, Titirangi

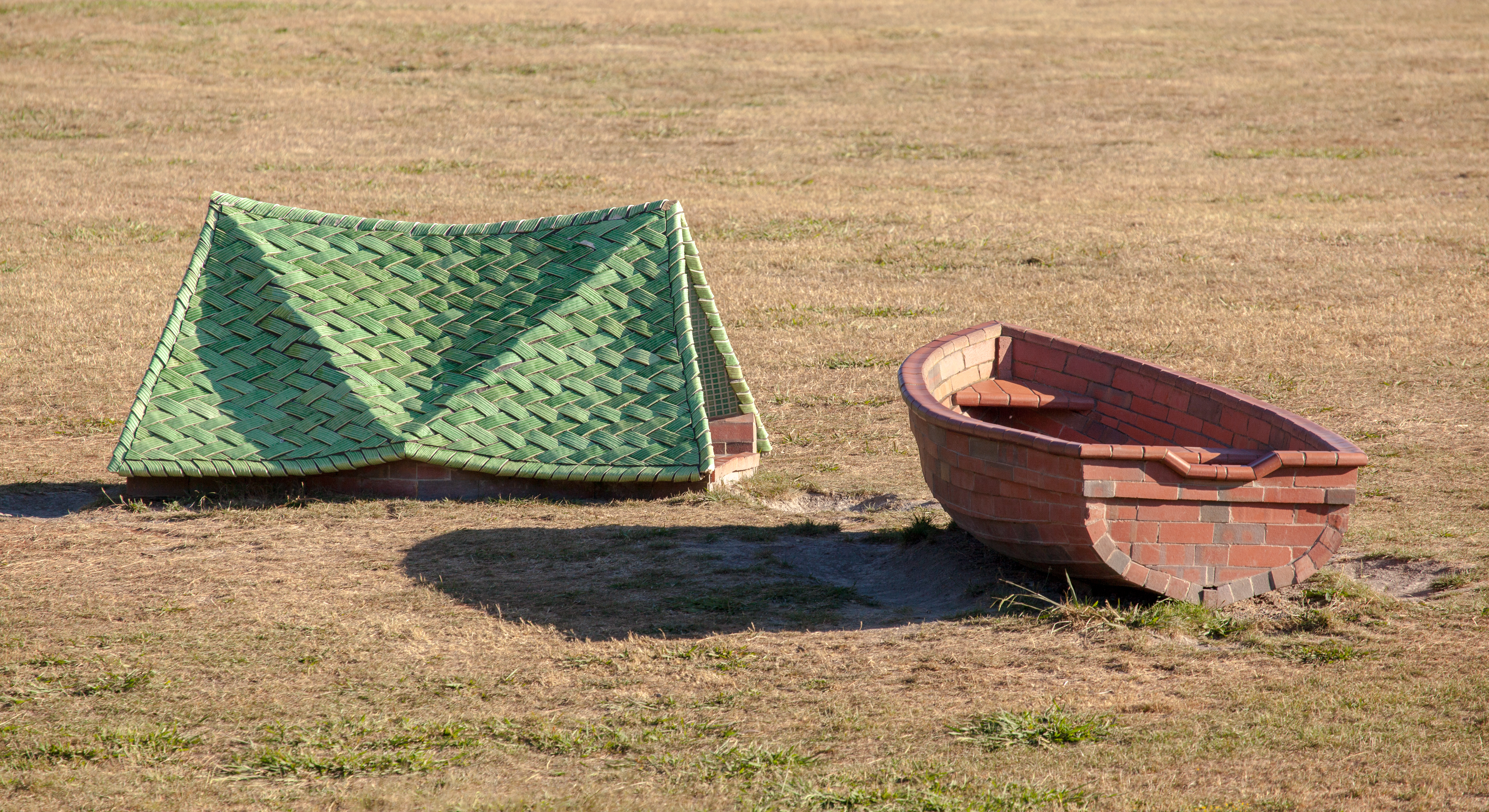
Camp Site (2007), located in the Auckland Botanic Gardens

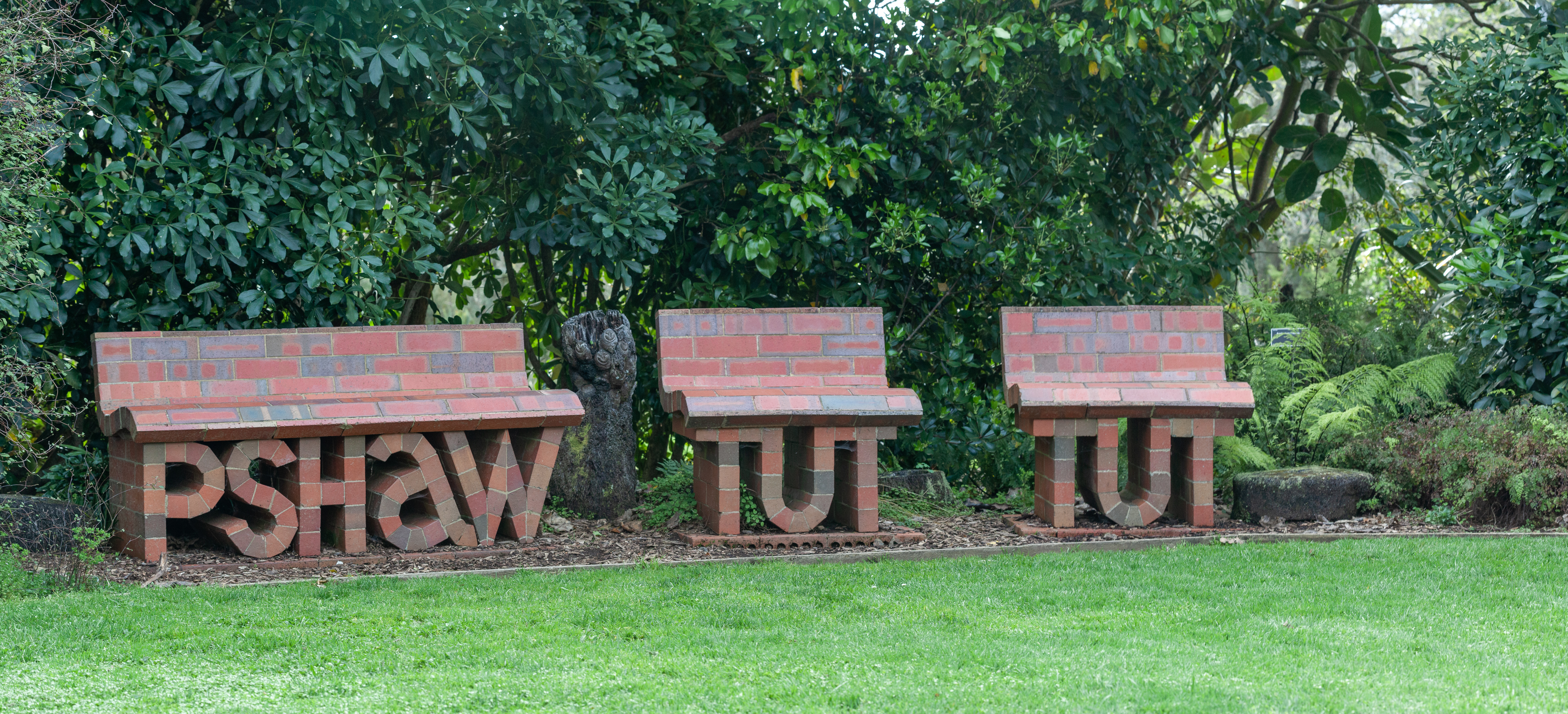
Curmudgeon Suite (2010), located in the Auckland Botanic Gardens

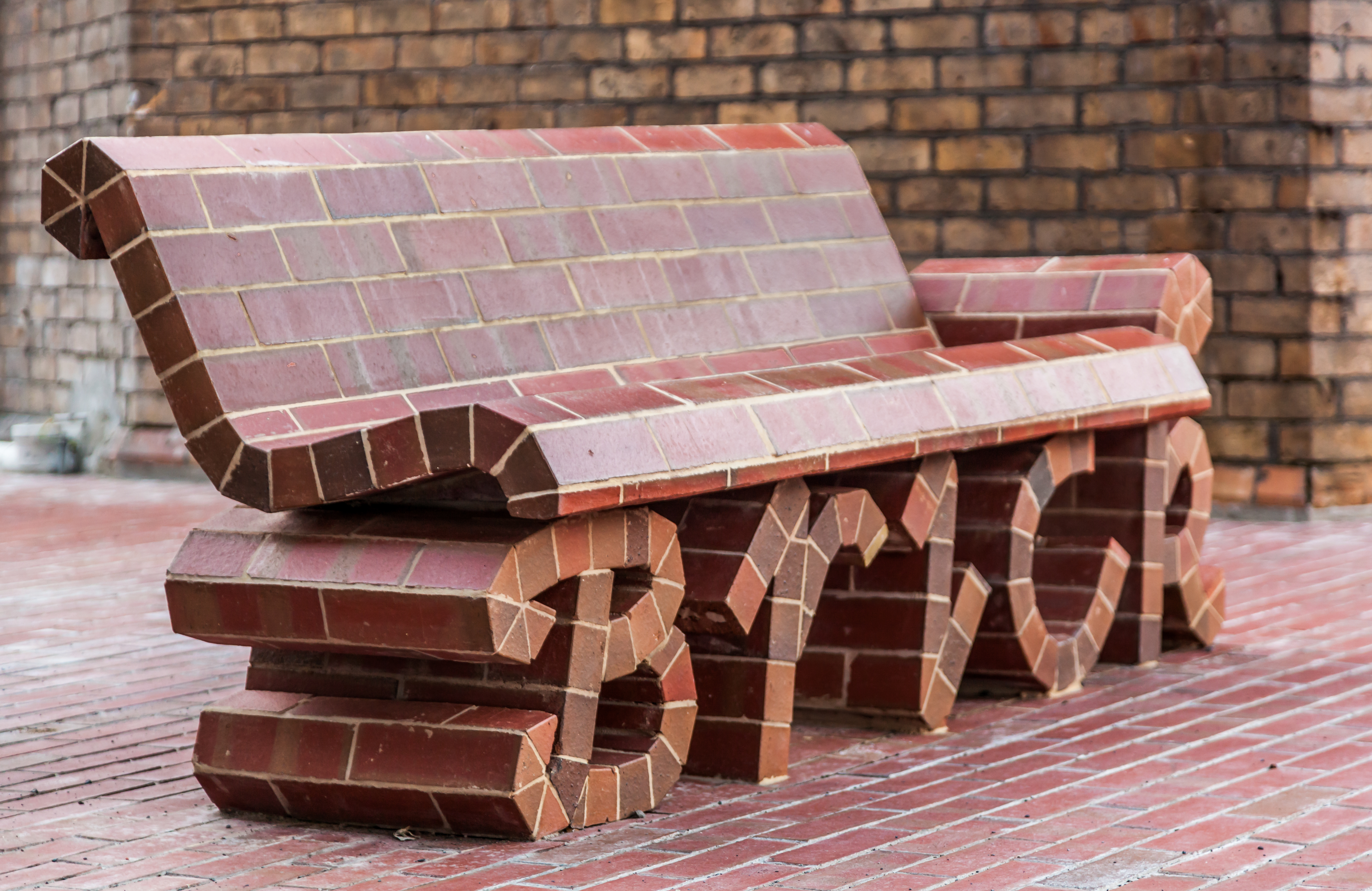
Brick (2011), located in New Lynn

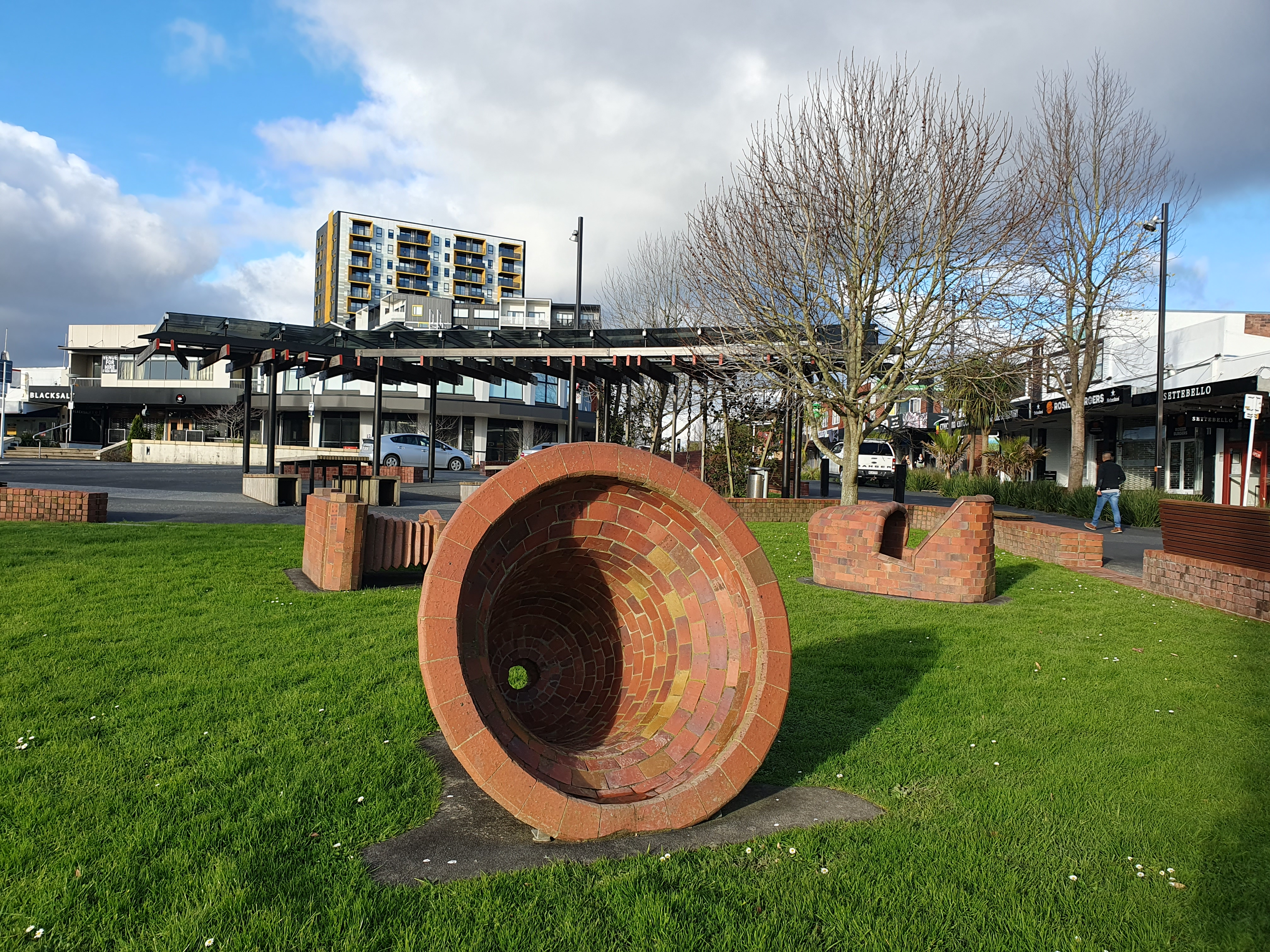
Tokens from the Game (2011), located in New Lynn
