= Timeline of the feminist art movement in New Zealand =

This is a timeline of the feminist art movement in New Zealand (Aotearoa). It lists important figures, collectives, publications, exhibitions and moments that have contributed to discussion and development of the movement. For the indigenous Māori population, the emergence of the feminist art movement broadly coincided with the emergence of Māori Renaissance.

== 1970s ==
1972

The feminist publication Broadsheet is co-founded by Anne Else and Sandra Coney in Auckland. It is New Zealand's first feminist magazine, and provides regular arts coverage. It ceases publication in 1997.

1974

Feminist poet Heather McPherson starts The Women Artists Group in Christchurch and begins working towards establishing the women's art journal Spiral, and the Spiral Collective.

1975

The Robert McDougall Art Gallery in Christchurch (now the Christchurch Art Gallery) organises Women's Art: An Exhibition of Six Women Artists to mark International Women's Year. The exhibition is curated by artist Allie Eagle, then Exhibitions Officer at the gallery.

Works from photographer Fiona Clark's series 'Dance Party', taken at a gay lib dance party at Auckland University in 1974, are withdrawn from the touring photography exhibition The Active Eye after accusations of indecency.

1976

The women's art journal Spiral begins publication. The International Women's Film Festival tours Dunedin, Christchurch, Wellington and Auckland.

1977

Members of Women's artists groups, including Heather McPherson and Allie Eagle, work together to produce the Women's Art Environment at the Canterbury Society of Arts.

1978

Allie Eagle show the works This woman died I care (based on a banned photograph of a woman who died after having an illegal abortion) and Empathy for a Rape Trial Victim; the exhibition stokes controversy and the artist receives hate mail.

1979

The Wellington Women's Gallery opens. Founded by Marian Evans, Anna Keir and Bridie Lonie the gallery was established as a non-profit, designed to 'support and promote women artists'.

Linda Buis begins her partnership with Peter Roche.Together they will enact key performance works through to 1985.

The National Art Gallery (now the Museum of New Zealand Te Papa Tongarewa) establishes the Women's Art Archives, designed to collect the 'existing, neglected work by women and keep track of new work'. The archive is expanded to include Australian and Pacific women artists.

== 1980s ==
1980

The National Art Gallery stages the exhibition Women in Communication, curated by exhibitions officer Louise Upton. It includes an open forum to support prints and photographs from New Zealand women artists. Work by Robin White, Vivian Lynn, Kate Coolahan and Gillian Chaplin were shown. The exhibition toured to Palmerston North and Whangārei and included video tapes from the Los Angeles Women's Video Centre.

1981

The Wellington Women's Gallery stages the exhibition Mothers, which tours New Zealand throughout 1981–1982.

1982

The F1 Sculpture Project developed by artist and curator Ian Hunter is staged in a large disused factory building on Tory Street in Wellington. A significant number of female artists make temporary installation pieces and a range of events were staged, including a two-day Women Sculptors Seminar.

Vivian Lynn shows her major sculptural work Guarden gates, now in the collection of the Museum of New Zealand Te Papa Tongarewa.

The Feminist Art Network group is established in Auckland, advocating for an increased profile for work by women and feminist work.

1983

The national art magazine Art New Zealand dedicates its Autumn issue to female artists and the women's art movement. Art historian Cheryll Sotheran writes an overview of the current state and reception of women's art in New Zealand, noting that 'most critics in New Zealand avoid or condemn exhibitions of women's art which use gender difference as a political weapon. The women whose art receives favourable reviews (or in many cases any reviews at all) are those whose work fits the modernist mould, are not feminists, are asexual and apolitical.'

Haeata, the Māori women's art collective, is established in Wellington. Guided by Patricia Grace, Bub Bridger, Robyn Kahukiwa and Bruce Stewart, the early meetings of writers, poets and playwrights later expand to many art forms. Members included Keri Kaa, Kohai Grace, Janet Pōtiki and Irihapeti Ramsden. It supports a number of significant women Māori artists and produces and tours exhibitions.

Bronwynne Cornish is commissioned by the Auckland Art Gallery to produce a solo work and creates a multi-part ceramic installation titled Dedicated to the Kindness of Mothers. In April, Gretchen Albrecht selects work for a group exhibition arranged by the Outreach Gallery in Auckland, New Works By Women.

In June, Juliet Batten facilitates The Menstrual Maze at Greer's Factory in Auckland. The June issue of feminist magazine Broadsheet includes a special feature on feminist artists. It includes Batten's article 'What is a feminist artist?'.

1983 also sees the founding of Aotearoa Moananui a Kiwa Weavers, a government funding stream specific to female-dominated art forms, Māori and Pacific weaving. It is now known as Te Roopu Raranga Whatu o Aotearoa and Māori-only.

1984

Robyn Kahukiwa exhibits her series of paintings Waahine Toa: Women in Maori Myth; the paintings are also reproduced in a book with text by Patricia Grace.

1985

Artist Juliet Batten leads the 'One Hundred Women' event at Te Henga (Bethells Beach) as part of the ANZART project.

1986

The journal Antic is launched. Art historian Tina Barton describes it as 'one forum for a more analytical explication of feminist theory and its applications in the field of literature, criticism and the visual arts, which could be seen as an alternative to the Broadsheet or Art New Zealand models.' It ceases publication in 1990.

Art critic Lita Barrie delivers a paper, 'Remissions: toward a deconstruction of phallic unequivocality: deferrals', at the Critic's Conference at the National Art Gallery. Informed by contemporary French theory and calling for a 'critical feminist art practice', Barrie attacked the essentialist form of feminist art practice common at the time, sending 'shock waves through the community of women artists to whom her paper was addressed'.

The first edition of Anne Kirker's New Zealand women artists is published by Reed Methuen.

Elizabeth Eastmond and Merimeri Penfold's Women and the Arts in New Zealand: Forty Works 1936–1986 is published by Penguin Books.

The Haeata collective organises the exhibition Karanga Karanga, which shows in Auckland, Wellington and Gisborne.

Vivian Lynn shows Gates of the Goddess – a southern crossing attended by the Goddess at the Govett-Brewster Art Gallery; the work is now in the collection of the Auckland Art Gallery).

1988

The National Art Gallery organises an exhibition of the work of American artist Barbara Kruger, curated by Jenny Harper. The exhibition is held at the Gallery's satellite contemporary art space, Shed 11. Kruger visits New Zealand for the opening of the exhibition and delivers a public lecture.

Marian Evans, Bridie Lonie and Tilly Lloyd co-edit A Women's picture book : 25 women artists of Aotearoa New Zealand. The authors intend to include a number of Māori artists, including Irihapeti Ramsden, Jacqueline Fraser and Robyn Kahukiwa but several withdraw after concerns about material included in the book which they felt to breach tapu.

Shona Rapira Davies and Robyn Kahukiwa collaborate on the exhibition Whakamaemae ('To feel pain') at City Gallery Wellington; the exhibition includes Rapira Davies' major sculptural work Nga Morehu.

1989

Following on from the exhibition of Kruger's work, National Art Gallery director Luit Bieringa curates an exhibition of work by photographer Cindy Sherman, also staged at Shed 11.

== 1990s ==
1990

This year marks New Zealand's sesquicentennial. A number of Māori women artists withdraw from the National Art Gallery's exhibition Kohia ko Taikaka Anake after learning that senior female artists will be made subordinate to senior male artists in its presentation. The Haeata collective presents Hineteiwaiwa, the 'womanhouse', for the Mana Tiriti exhibition at City Gallery Wellington.

1992

Cheryll Sotheran is appointed as the founding CEO of the new Museum of New Zealand Te Papa Tongarewa, which merges New Zealand's national museum and national art gallery.

1993

This year marks the 100th anniversary of women's suffrage in New Zealand.

Art New Zealand dedicates its Spring issue that year to female artists and feminist topics. Art historian Tina Barton is commissioned to write a review of the decade since the last issue of the magazine devoted to women artists. A number of exhibitions exploring women in New Zealand's art history and feminist art issues are staged around the country, including Alter / Image in Wellington and Auckland, Mediatrix : new works by seven women artists at Artspace in Auckland (curated by Priscilla Pitts and featuring Mary-Louise Browne, Denise Kum, Julia Morison, Marie Shannon, Deborah Smith, Aromea Tahiwi and Barbara Tuck); Unruly Practices (a series of solo projects by feminist artists living in Auckland - Carole Shepheard, Claudia Pond Eyley, Mary McIntyre, Christine Hellyar and Sylvia Siddell) at Auckland Art Gallery, White Camellias : a century of women's artmaking in Canterbury and Women on women : art in Dunedin since 1893 at the Dunedin Public Art Gallery, curated by Linda Tyler. Alter / Image was also one of four inaugural exhibitions, all featuring female artists, that marked the opening of City Gallery Wellington in its new location in the old Public Library building in Wellington's Civic Square; the others were Rosemarie Trockel, Te Whare Puanga (recent weaving and tivaevae by Maori and Pacific Island women in Wellington) and He Tohu: The New Zealand Room, a site-specific project by Jacqueline Fraser. An updated version of Anne Kirker's 1986 book New Zealand Women Artists is published as New Zealand women artists : a survey of 150 years by Reed Methuen.

1994

Australian art magazine Artlink devotes its Autumn issue to 'Art & the Feminist Project'. The issue features articles by New Zealand writers Tina Barton ('Making (a) difference: Suffrage year celebrations and the visual arts in New Zealand') and Anne Kirker ('Re-orienting feminism in Aotearoa').

== 2000s ==
2000

The Govett-Brewster Art Gallery stages In glorious dreams, an exhibition of new work by women artists.

2001

Artist Jacqueline Fraser is selected, along with Peter Robinson, to represent New Zealand in its first participation at the Venice Biennale.

2002

The Govett-Brewster Art Gallery stages Go Girl, a survey of the work of photographer Fiona Clark. The exhibition includes works withdrawn from the 1975 exhibition The Active Eye after accusations of indecency relating to their depiction of the LGBT community.

2004

The Museum of New Zealand Te Papa Tongarewa stages Judy Darragh: So ... You Made It, the only solo exhibition of a contemporary New Zealand artist presented at the museum between its opening in 1998 and the 'Toi Art' refreshment that opened in 2018.

2008

The Museum of New Zealand Te Papa Tongarewa presents the exhibition We are unsuitable for framing. Curated by Charlotte Huddleston, the exhibition is titled after a work by Barbara Kruger held in the museum's collection and included in the artist's 1988 exhibition in Wellington. It includes works produced between 1974 and 2005 and aimed to explore 'aspects of identity, gender, sexuality, and mythology'.

2009

The Adam Art Gallery holds a workshop titled 'Out Loud: Using the 'F' Word Today', featuring a range of female curators and artists, to accompany its survey exhibition of the work of Vivian Lynn, I, HERE, NOW Vivian Lynn.

== 2010 - present ==
2012

The Dowse Art Museum stages the touring exhibition In Spite of Ourselves: Approaching Documentary, which includes a work by Qatari/US artist, Sophia Al-Maria, For Your Eyes Only (2007) which shows female members of a family preparing for a wedding in a space in a house only used by women and children. The artists requests that the video work only be shown to female visitors: when the museum complies with this request protests are made that men are being excluded from the museum.

2013

Writer Thomasin Sleigh publishes an analysis of the contemporary editorial approach of Art New Zealand, concluding that 'the artist most likely for Art New Zealand to run an article on would be a Pakeha painter, and his work would most likely be written about by a Pakeha man employed by an academic institution.'

2014

Art History honours students at the University of Auckland organise Voicing the Visible, an exhibition of female and feminist artists work from the university's collection for the Gus Fisher Gallery.

2015

Enjoy Public Art Gallery in Wellington presents Enjoy Feminisms, an exhibition programme that sought to demonstrate the multiple meanings of feminism to contemporary artists, and publishes Love Feminisms, an online journal to accompany the exhibition programme.

The Adam Art Gallery presents Fragments of a World: Artists Working in Film and Photography 1973–1987, curated by Dr Sandy Callister, an exhibition investigating 'the intersection of feminism, new technologies, and a disruptive epoch'.

The Dowse Art Museum in Lower Hutt organises an 'Art + Feminism' Wikipedia edit-a-thon to improve coverage of New Zealand women artists.

2016

The Dowse Art Museum organises 'Four Waves of Feminism', a symposium exploring current and historical feminist art, activity and research.

Barbara Brookes' A History of New Zealand Women is published by Bridget Williams Books. Heavily illustrated with the work of women artists including Olivia Spencer Bower, Rita Angus, Margaret Stoddart and Louise Henderson, the reproductions are presented 'not simply as illustrations for the immediate text but as a narrative in themselves. ... this is, presenting a woman's perspective.'

The Adam Art Gallery presents Bad Visual Systems, an exhibition by Berlin-based, New Zealand-born artist Ruth Buchanan. For the exhibition Buchanan shows the work of German artists Judith Hopf and Marianne Wex. The exhibition presents panels from Wex's photographic book Let's Take Back Our Space; sheets from the book had been printed in a 1984 edition of the feminist magazine Broadsheet when Wex was living in Wellington.

2018

2018 marks the 125th anniversary of women's suffrage in New Zealand.

Christchurch Art Gallery presents We Do This, an exhibition of work by women artists. largely from the gallery's permanent collection, in a 'recharged contemporary hang to mark 125 years of women's suffrage.'

The Dowse Art Museum presents "Embodied Knowledge", an exhibition of "significant sculptural works made by women artists during a tumultuous period of Aotearoa New Zealand's art history" featuring older and new works by Christine Hellyar, Maureen Lander, Vivian Lynn, Pauline Rhodes, The Estate of L. Budd. A pendant exhibition, Can Tame Anything, features work by a newer generation of women artists and collectives; Ruth Buchanan, Alicia Frankovich, Mata Aho Collective, Sriwhana Spong.

2019

The Auckland Art Gallery presents Guerrilla Girls: Reinventing the 'F' Word – Feminism!, an exhibition of work by the famous feminist art collective Guerilla Girls. The exhibition includes statistical analysis presented in the collective's signature format of the proportion of exhibitions of women artists at the gallery.

The Spinoff publishes Anna Knox's investigative article 'Gender bias and art in Aotearoa: a Spinoff survey reveals the harsh reality'.

== See also ==
- Feminism in New Zealand
- List of New Zealand artists
- Australian feminist art timeline
