= Juliet Batten =

New Zealand artist, poet and non-fiction writer (1942)

- Born: 1942 (age 83–84); Inglewood
- Education: University of Auckland
- Known for: Art performances and writing focused of feminism and the environment. Writing on and practice of psychotherapy
- Notable work: 'The menstrual maze' (1983), '100 Women project (1985)
- Style: Ritual based community performances
- Movement: Feminist art
- Website: https://www.julietbatten.co.nz/

Juliet Batten (born 1942) played a role in the establishment of the feminist art movement in New Zealand with performance work involving ritual and community involvement. She went on to become a psychotherapist and healer committed to community-driven ritualistic practices.

== Early life ==
Juliet Batten was born in Inglewood in 1942. After studying in Taranaki and Auckland she graduated in 1969 with a PhD in English from the University of Auckland. Batten then spent two years in Paris on a Doctoral Fellowship. On her return to New Zealand she combined teaching art history at the University of Auckland with art-making and settled in Te Henga outside Auckland.

== Art practice ==
Batten began her art career as a craft person who went on to paint, but by the early 1980s she was focused on performing and recording ritual based works that foregrounded environmental and feminist issues. Often in the form of nature-based rituals, Batten's work depended on the co-operation and collaboration of other women. She acknowledges that an impetus behind early versions of such collaborative work was her friendship with the feminist artist Allie Eagle who had moved to Te Henga in 1978. Batten has spoken about how her friendship with Eagle ‘unlocked her art,’ and ‘crystallised her ideas.’ Eagle in turn has also acknowledged Batten for her own shift to environmental issues. Other artists who found Batten's focus on community influential included Carol Shepheard who participated in Batten's Lifescape environment. In discussing Batten's work, art historian Cheryll Sotheran commented that Batten's use of the landscape to present spiritual values was ‘significant’ and that by using many different media including photography, sketches, oil pastels and watercolours she had created a ‘vocabulary of female spirituality and creativity’. In 1980 Batten became a founding member of the Women's Gallery in Wellington along with a group of other women artists both based in Wellington and from around the country including Fiona Clark, Allie Eagle, Marion Evans, Claudia Pond Eyley, Keri Hume, Anna Keir, Bridie Lonie, Heather McPherson, Joanna Paul, Nancy Peterson, Helen Rockel, Carole Stewart and Tiffany Thornley. The same year Batten facilitated the Ponsonby Women's Outreach, a gallery environment specifically for women. In 1981 Batten received a Queen Elizabeth II Arts Council grant to travel to the United States. She visited the Woman's Building in San Francisco where she was able to observe leading edge experimental lesbian and feminist art.

== Selected exhibitions and performances ==
Batten remained a feminist artist throughout the eighties and nineties known for her collaborative art projects for women and ritual performances. In 1988 she published her book Power from Within that summed up Batten's work as ‘an artist, teacher and ritual maker’ up to that time.

1980

- Opening Show (group) Women's Gallery, Wellington.
- Diaries (group) Women's Gallery, Wellington.
- Women in the Arts (group), Outreach, Auckland.

1981

- Mothers (group) Women's Gallery, Wellington. Co-ordinated by Marian Evans and Anna Keir.
- Birth Series: Watercolours by Juliet Batten Denis Cohen Gallery, Auckland.
- Women, Water and Sand O’Neills Bay, Auckland.

1982

- Deathbed Lifescape installation, Auckland.
- Seeds New Vision Gallery, Auckland.
- F1 Sculpture Project, (group) Wellington. Batten and Barbara Strathdee organised a two-day seminar surveying current activity in the visual arts by women in New Zealand.

1983

- Workbooks/Diaries Women's Gallery, Wellington.
- The Menstrual Maze at Greer's Factory, Auckland.
- Mending New Vision Gallery, Auckland.
- Women to Women (group) Outreach Gallery, Auckland.

1984

- Ongoing Rituals Outreach, Auckland.
- Diary Performance Ponsonby, Auckland.

1985.

- !00 Women Project. Performed as part of ANZART coordinated by Batten on Te Henga Beach.

1986

- Totems (group) CSA Gallery, Christchurch.
- Pageworks I and II (group) Outreach Gallery, Auckland.
- Juliet Batten: Flying Souls Denis Cohen Gallery
- Unearthing Outreach, Auckland. Batten filmed the performance which was later shown as Unearthing in 1989.
- Women and Culture (group) Outreach Gallery, Auckland.
- Knitting the tide Te Henga, Auckland

1987

- The Inanna Cycle Gallery Pacific, Auckland.
- Threshold Outreach Gallery, Auckland.

1988

- Songs of the Green Snake Society of Arts, Auckland.

1990

- Sacred Spaces Green Shed, Auckland.
- Mana Tiriti: The Art of Protest and Partnership (group) City Gallery, Wellington (toured).

1993

- alter/image (group) City Gallery, Wellington. Batten performance was titled The Simultaneous Dress.

1995

- Juliet Batten: Ongoing rituals. Denis Cohn Gallery, Auckland.

== Critical Response ==
The feminist art movement that Batten helped pioneer was not treated seriously by many critics. Batten asserted that feminist artists were still ‘under the power of narrow-minded, biased reviewing’ and that they should ‘work together to give all women visibility, including Māori and lesbian artists.’ She believed that only collective action could help grow the number of women working for change in the arts. The movements strongest critic was Lita Barrie. She singled Batten out for her use of pastel colours, flower imagery and ‘vaginal forms’ for their too obvious reference to feminist concerns. Art Historian Anne Kirker consistently labelled Batten as a teacher and facilitator rather than an artist. She argued that Batten's work sacrificed aesthetics for process and suggested that by collaborating with groups of women she ‘created less effective results in that it tended to disperse the communication’ and ‘prove less effective’. Other early arguments against the feminist art movement claimed that, ‘Femininity is not involved any more than masculinity in the work of men painters. Art transcends sex." Feminist critics like Cheryll Sotheran were more generous. Sotheran admired Batten's approach, ‘She emphasises the progressive, time-related nature of the experience, both in the making of the works and in their implied qualities’

== Writing ==
=== Early writing and writing on art ===
Batten first had poems published in Landfall 126 and 129 in the 1970s and from the 1980s published a significant number of books many of them illustrated with her own work. Batten has also written articles, papers and books both as a practising artist and later as a professional psychotherapist. Her publications on art include:

1981–1983

Batten presented ‘Emerging from Underground: The Women’s Art Movement in New Zealand’ as a Women's Studies Conference paper. This paper was published in Spiral Magazine the following year and in 1988 in book form as Power from Within: A Feminist Guide to Ritual-Making.

1982 Women, water and sand: a personal account.

Batten also spread her ideas on feminism and art through her writing in the feminist magazine Broadsheet. In 1983 Batten's piece titled ‘What is a Feminist Artist?’ focussed on 35 women artists asking the question What is a feminist artist? As art historian Katryn Baker has noted the 1980s, “were a decade marked by discussions that aimed to clarify the true meaning of feminism, its various connotations, and how to apply it to the art world in a way that would enable other women artists and the broader public to comprehend the feminist discourse without viewing it as “too” political or dangerous.” Batten took up the topic again in Broadsheet in 1986.

1987 The Edmonds Cookbook and the Ivory Tower. The piece was a rebuttal to the essay Remissions: Toward a Deconstruction of Phallic Univocality written by art critic and theorist Lita Barrie in 1986.

1989 Art and Identity in Culture and Identity in New Zealand.

1995 Celebrating the Southern: Rituals for Aotearoa.

1997 Releasing the Artist Within: The Visual Diary.

=== Later writing by Juliet Batten ===
- Growing into Wisdom: Change and Transformation at Midlife. (2000)
- A Cup of Sunlight: Bringing the Sacred into Everyday Life. (2005)
- Touching Snow: A Taranaki Memoir. Batten's autobiography. (2008)
- Dancing with the Seasons. (2010)
- Spirited Ageing. (2013)
- A Bach for All Seasons (2017)

== Professional life ==
Alongside her work as a practicing artist Batten spent over 25 years as a psychotherapist. More recently she has participated in research around aging and the benefits of mindfulness and community. She asserts that rituals around dying in Pākehā culture need to be transformed into more personal rituals and that spiritual care is integral to compassionate care.
