= Heather McPherson (poet) =

New Zealand poet, publisher and editor (1942–2017)

- Born: Heather Avis McPherson; 28 May 1942; Tauranga, New Zealand
- Died: 10 January 2017 (aged 74); Hamilton, New Zealand
- Occupations: Poet; publisher; editor
- Children: 1
- Writing career
- Notable work: A Figurehead: A Face (1982)
- Movement: Lesbian feminism

Heather Avis McPherson (28 May 1942 – 10 January 2017) was a feminist poet, publisher and editor who played a key role in supporting women artists and writers in New Zealand. In 1976, she founded the Spiral Collective group and Spiral, a women's arts and literary journal that later published monographs. Her poetry book A Figurehead: A Face (1982) was the first book of poetry published in New Zealand by an openly lesbian woman. She published three further collections during her lifetime, and an additional two collections were published posthumously by fellow Spiral members.

== Life and career ==
=== Early life and career ===
Born in Tauranga, McPherson initially trained as a primary school teacher in the early 1960s. She subsequently studied at the University of Canterbury, where she earned a Bachelor of Arts in 1971, and at the University of Auckland. Her poetry first appeared in print in 1963, with her early work being published in New Zealand journals like Landfall.

Her influential literary and visual arts activism was inspired by an all-male poets' evening at the 1973 Christchurch Festival, where she observed "twenty young men getting up on the stage one after another". In later years, she said that in the early 1970s she approached Leo Bensemann, then the editor of Landfall, to see if he would be willing to publish a collection of her works; when she mentioned she had become a feminist, he responded that Rita Angus had also become a feminist "but it didn't do her any good either".

=== Women's artist collectives ===
In 1974, McPherson founded one of New Zealand's first women's artist collectives, the Women Artists Group in Christchurch, with other members including Paulette Barr, Allie Eagle (also known as Alison Mitchell) and Kathryn Algie. This group co-founded the first New Zealand women's art journal, Spiral and the women artist's collective Spiral.

Spiral provided a forum for female artists and writers to publish their work, during a time in which female artists struggled to be recognised in New Zealand. McPherson herself said, "I worked with the material we received–that it didn't reflect our own reality didn't bother me too much, it was the idea of women working together positively, that was the aim, and the amalgam of arts – photographers as well as poets, writers, painters etc." The journal was first published in 1976 through the efforts of the Spiral Collective, which was to become a floating imprint used by different feminist groups. The first four issues were published by McPherson and the Christchurch collective (1976–79), issue five was published by a Wellington collective, issue six by a Tauranga collective, and issue seven by a national collective. A letter published in an early issue suggested that work should be accepted on merit rather than limited to work by women only; in response, McPherson said she supported positive discrimination for women and noted the barriers faced by women to publication in most magazines.

Spiral also became an imprint used by different feminist groups to publish other books by New Zealand women, including McPherson's debut poetry collection, A Figurehead: A Face (Spiral, 1982), which was the first New Zealand poetry collection by an out lesbian. In her introduction to the collection McPherson noted that since the 1970s she had sought "to make a new start, to clear out the 'patriarchy in the head'", and on other hand to "redefine such emotionally charged concepts as 'woman' and 'lesbian' with their pejorative accretions". Other works published by Spiral included Keri Hulme's Booker Prize-winning novel The Bone People (1984), The House of the Talking Cat by J C Sturm (Jacquie Baxter, 1983), and Drawing Together by Janet Charman, Marina Bachmann and Sue Fitchett (1985). Artists and writers who were associated with the Women Artists Group initiatives and the Spiral Collectives included Joanna Margaret Paul, Marian Evans, Allie Eagle, Bridie Lonie, and Anna Keir, all prominent figures in the women's art movement in New Zealand.

=== Later career ===
In 1980, McPherson was involved in the opening show at the Women's Gallery in Wellington, where she worked as a co-ordinator. Her poem, Have You Heard of Artemisia? was painted on the 1981 Matariki Mural on the outside wall of the gallery on Harris Street. In 1986, she attended the second International Feminist Book Fair in Oslo with other Spiral members. She was a supporter of and advisor to the Spiral video project Getting Free (1997 to 2009), led by Marian Evans and Bridie Lonie.

After A Figurehead: A Face, McPherson published three further collections of poetry in her lifetime. Her poetry was described by Aorewa McLeod in The Oxford Companion to New Zealand Literature as "strongly feminist, combining myth with the implications of being a woman and a lesbian in New Zealand", and featuring "a distinctive witty intelligence together with a sensitive and lyrical voice".

== Personal life and legacy ==
McPherson was a single mother and grandmother, and in her early career worked various "survival jobs" such as fruit picking and school bus driving in order to support her family. In her obituary, Michael O'Leary said that family "was also a big part of her life as well as writing and she was very involved with her grandchildren". She identified as a lesbian feminist and as a part of the women's liberation movement.

McPherson died in Hamilton on 10 January 2017. After her death, in early 2018, a collective of Spiral members Janet Charman, Lynne Ciochetto and Marian Evans published a collection of poetry by McPherson, called This Joyous, Chaotic Place: Garden Poems, as part of an exhibition called "This Joyous, Chaotic Place: He Waiata Tangi-ā-Tahu" at Mokopōpaki, an Auckland dealer gallery with Māori values at its centre. The event included the screening of an interview of McPherson in 1980, and was a project that formed part of the celebrations in New Zealand marking 125 years since women's suffrage. The collection featured what McPherson called her "garden poems", inspired by her visits to the graveside of early New Zealand poet Ursula Bethell.

== Works ==
=== Poetry books ===
Source: National Library of NZ

- i do not cede, edited and with an introduction by Emer Lyons (eBook), Spiral, Wellington, 2022
- This Joyous Chaotic Place: Garden Poems, Spiral, Wellington, 2018
- Travel and Other Compulsions, Earl of Seacliff Art Workshop, Paekakariki, 2004
- Other World Relations, Old Bags, Wellington, 1991
- The Third Myth, Tauranga Moana Press, Tauranga, 1986
- A Figurehead: a Face, Spiral, Wellington, 1982

=== Exhibition ===
This Joyous, Chaotic Place: He Waiata Tangi-ā-Tahu Mokopōpaki, 2018

=== Anthologies ===
Sources: National Library of NZ and Aotearoa Poetry Sound Archive

- This Joyous, Chaotic Place: He Waiata Tangi-āTahu (with texts from Allie Eagle, Dr P (Cushla Parekowhai), Heather McPherson, Margery Blackman, M (Marian Evans), Tiffany Thornley), Mokopōpaki & Spiral, 2019
- Manifesto Aotearoa ed. Philip Temple & Emma Neale, Otago University Press, Dunedin, 2017
- Live Lines IV ed. Miriam Barr, Rachael Naomi Heimann, Penny Sommervaile, Jeremy Roberts, Poetry Live, Auckland, 2011
- Remember us: women who love women, from Sappho to liberation ed. Miriam Saphira, Heather McPherson & Fran Marno, Charlotte Museum Trust, New Zealand, 2008
- Big Smoke: New Zealand Poems 1960–75 ed. Michele Leggott Murray Edmond, Alan Brunton, Auckland University Press, Auckland 2000
- Eat These Sweet Words, ed. Sue Fitchett, Marewa Glover, Cary McDermott & Rhona Vickoce, Giant Publishing Press, Christchurch 1999
- Car Maintenance, Explosives and Love, ed. Susan Hawthorne, Cathy Dunsford & Susan Sayer, Spinifex, Nth. Melb, 1997
- Spiral 7: a collection of lesbian art and writing from Aotearoa/New Zealand, ed. Heather McPherson, Julie King, Marian Evans, Pam Gerrish Nunn, Daphne Brasell Associates Press, Wellington, 1992
- Lavender Annual, ed. Miriam Saphira, Papers Inc., 1989
- Kiwi and Emu: An Anthology of Contemporary Poetry by Australian and New Zealand Women, ed. Barbara Petrie, Butterfly, 1989
- The Penguin Book of Contemporary New Zealand Poetry, ed. Miriama Evans, Harvey McQueen and Ian Wedde, 1989
- A Women's Picture Book: 25 Women Artists of Aotearoa New Zealand ed. Marian Evans, Bridie Lonie, Tilly Lloyd, Government Print, Wellington, 1988
- Yellow Pencils: Contemporary Poetry by New Zealand Women, chosen by Lydia Wevers, OUP, 1988
- The New Poets of the ‘80s, ed. Murray Edmond & Mary Paul, Allen & Unwin, 1987
- The Penguin Book of New Zealand Verse, ed. Ian Wedde and Harvey McQueen, 1985.
- The Turning Face, Twelve Writers from Tauranga Moana ed. Robert de Roo, Tauranga Moana Press, 1984
- Spiral 4 ed. Spiral Collective: Ruth Lawley, Heather McPherson, Wendy Prestney, Tiffany Thornily, Chris Smith, Gladys Gurney, Spiral, Christchurch, 1979
- Spiral 3 ed. Spiral Collective: Patsy Keene, Anna Keir, Ruth Lawley, Heather McPherson, Wendy Prestney, Tiffany Thornley, Spiral, Christchurch, 1978
- Spiral 2 ed. Spiral Collective: Kath Algie, Paulette Barr, Heather McPherson, Alison Mitchell, Spiral, Christchurch, 1977
- Private Gardens: An Anthology of New Zealand Women Poets, ed. Riemke Ensing, Caveman, 1977
- Spiral 1 ed. Heather McPherson, Spiral, Christchurch, 1976
- Arts Festival Year Book 1969, New Zealand Universities, ed. Bill Manhire & John Dickson, Dunedin
- Kiwi 1963, ed. Tyme Curnow & Terry Snow, Auckland University Press
