= Jacquie Sturm =

New Zealand writer (1927–2009)

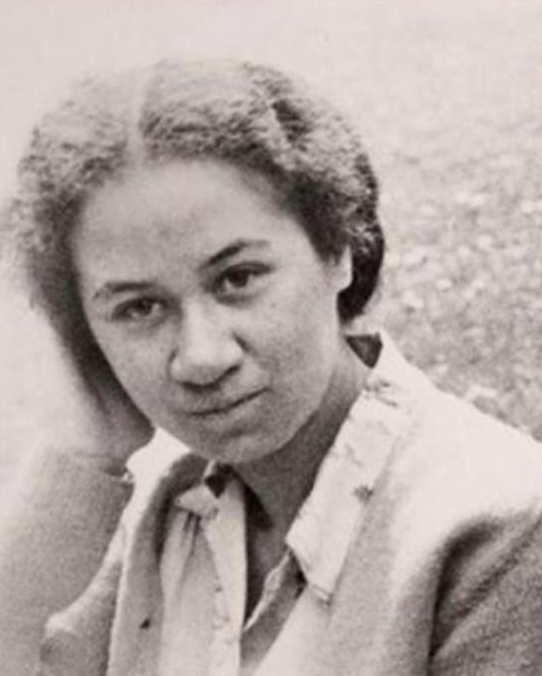
- Sturm, c. 1948
- Born: Te Kare Papuni; 17 May 1927; Ōpunake, New Zealand
- Died: 30 December 2009 (aged 82); Paekākāriki, New Zealand
- Resting place: Ōpunake
- Occupations: Poet; short story writer
- Spouses: James K. Baxter (m. 1948; died 1972); Peter Alcock (m. 1997; died 2007)
- Children: 2, including John Baxter
- Writing career
- Period: 1946–2006

Jacqueline Cecilia Sturm (born Te Kare Papuni, also known as Jacquie Baxter; 17 May 1927 – 30 December 2009) was a New Zealand poet, short story writer and librarian. She was one of the first Māori women to complete an undergraduate university degree, at Victoria University College, followed by a Masters of Arts degree in philosophy. She was also the first Māori writer to have her work published in an English anthology. Her short stories were published in several collections and student magazines in the 1950s and early 1960s, and in 1983 a women's publishing collective printed a collection of her short stories as The House of the Talking Cat. She continued to write short stories and poetry well into the early 2000s, and is regarded today as a pioneer of New Zealand literature.

== Early life ==
Sturm was born on 17 May 1927 in Ōpunake, Taranaki, New Zealand. Her birth name was Te Kare Papuni. Her father, John Raymond Papuni, was part of the Whakatōhea iwi from Ōpōtiki in the Bay of Plenty region, and her mother, Mary Kingsley Harrison, was the daughter of Moewaka Tautokai, an adopted daughter of Taranaki chief Wiremu Kingi Moki Te Matakatea, and Te Whare Matangi Harrison, a nephew of the English novelist Charles Kingsley.

Sturm's mother died of septicaemia shortly after her birth. Her father took her older sister Evadne back to the Bay of Plenty to be raised by his family, but Sturm's maternal grandmother Tautokai insisted on raising her in Taranaki. However, when Sturm was four, Tautokai became ill and believed she was dying, so Sturm was fostered by a local nurse and her husband, Ethel and Bert Sturm. They renamed her Jacqueline Cecilia Sturm and formally adopted her in 1941. Ethel was Pākehā, while Bert was Ngāti Kahungunu and Ngāti Porou, and a greengrocer. Both were in their late 50s/early 60s at the time of the adoption and had two elder daughters. Sturm grew up with them in a predominantly Pākehā environment, and wrote in later years of her feeling of being out of place or living between worlds. Her poem "In Loco Parentis" recalled how the Sturms "... planted, nurtured / Trained, pruned, grafted me / Only to find a native plant / Will always a native be".

Sturm began writing poetry at age 11, while recovering from what may have been rheumatic fever and living in Pukerua Bay. She excelled at school both academically and in sport, becoming school dux and swimming champion of Napier Girls' High School. In her late teens, she visited Māori communities in Urewera and the Bay of Plenty, where her father was from, and after this experience had ambitions of becoming a doctor. Reverend Manuhuia Bennett (later the Bishop of Aotearoa) was impressed by her educational achievements and was instrumental in encouraging her parents to allow her to enrol at the University of Otago.

== University and marriage ==
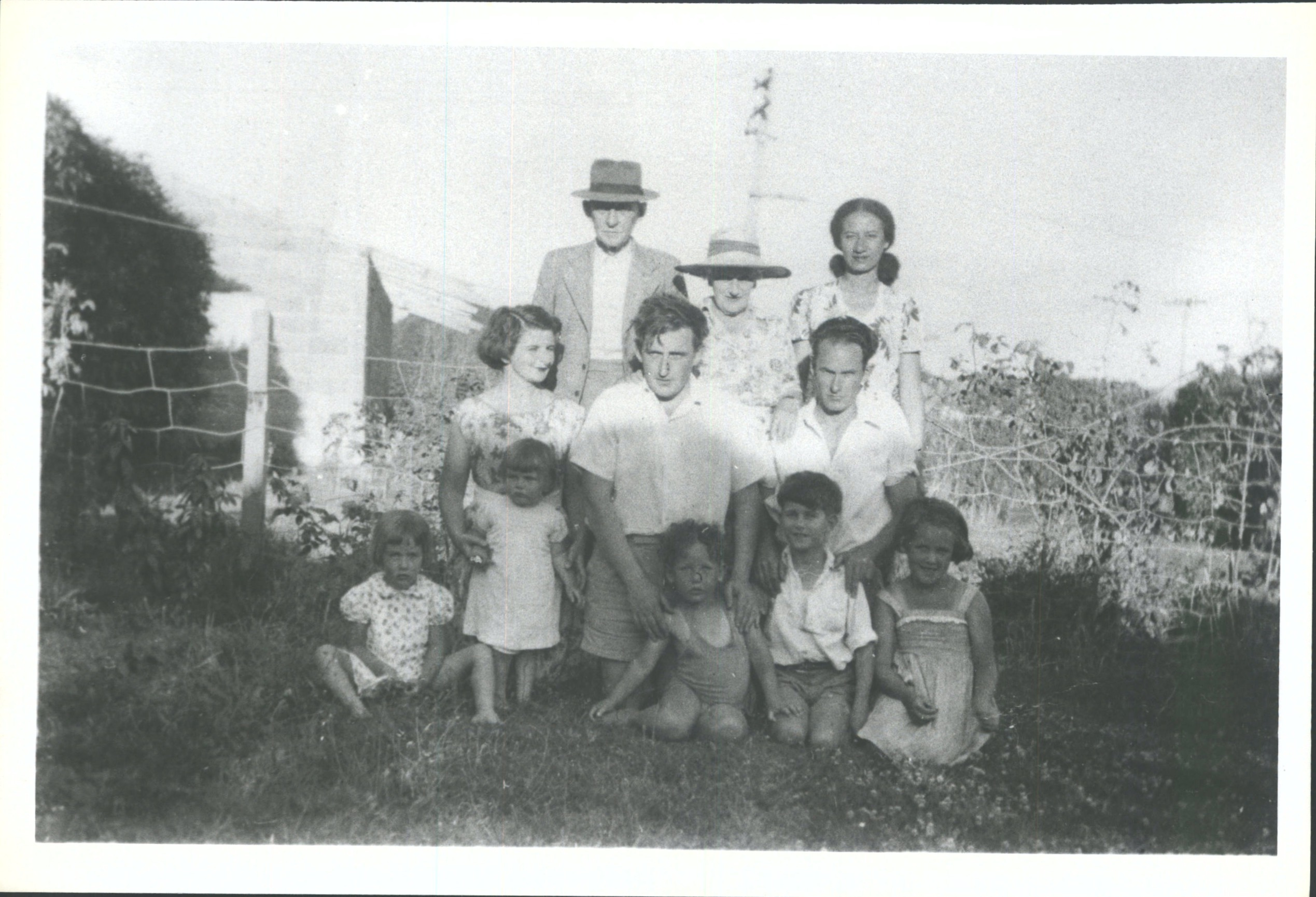
Jacquie Baxter (back right) with her husband (centre), their children (son kneeling in front of him and daughter front right), his brother's family and his parents in circa 1955

In 1946, Sturm began studying at the University of Otago; she was the only Māori woman on campus. Her initial plan had been to study medicine, but despite earning strong grades, she narrowly missed out on entrance to the medical school due to admissions criteria favouring soldiers returned from the Second World War. She therefore started studying towards a Bachelor of Arts, initially with a view to re-trying for admission to the medical school, but decided instead to pursue graduate study in anthropology. Sturm had her first poem published in the student magazine Critic, and was a runner-up in an annual poetry competition to another young New Zealand poet, James K. Baxter. Her first impression of Baxter was that he was "a somewhat dopey-looking individual, not my idea of a poet, but he had a marvellous voice and he knew how to use it".

In late 1947 Sturm moved to Canterbury University College in Christchurch to study anthropology under the well-known social psychologist Ivan Sutherland. By this time she and Baxter were in a relationship and he moved to Christchurch with her. Sturm later recalled feeling disconcerted when he turned up in her lectures. He suffered from alcoholism during this time and his behaviour was often erratic. Baxter became the literary editor of the student magazine Canta, but did not publish any poems written by Sturm, and her first poems in the magazine were published by Bill Pearson when he took over the role from Baxter in 1948.

When Sturm and Baxter began speaking of marriage in late 1948, both sets of parents tried to dissuade them, given that they were only 21 and 22 respectively. Despite this parental opposition, Sturm and Baxter married on 9 December 1948 at the Cathedral of St John the Evangelist, Napier, then moved to Wellington.

In 1949, Sturm graduated from Victoria University College with a Bachelor of Arts, becoming one of the first Māori women to complete an undergraduate university degree. That same year she gave birth to her and Baxter's daughter, Hilary. Hilary's godfather was the painter Colin McCahon. In 1952, Sturm graduated from Victoria University College with a Masters of Arts in Philosophy, one of the first masters' degrees awarded to a Māori woman. Her dissertation, "New Zealand National Character as Exemplified in Three New Zealand Novelists", was commended as being of exceptional merit, and she was awarded first class honours. In that same year, Sturm and Baxter had a son, John.

== 1950s to 1970s ==
Early in the 1950s, Sturm began to write short stories, partly to distinguish her own writing from her husband's poetry. For similar reasons, she wrote under the name J.C. Sturm rather than using her married name. Her first short story, "The Old Coat", was published in the journal Numbers in 1954. The following year, "For All the Saints" was published in the journal Te Ao Hou / The New World. She featured regularly in both journals through the 1950s and 1960s, and in 1966 C. K. Stead selected "For All the Saints" for inclusion in his anthology of New Zealand short stories published by the Oxford University Press. She was the first Māori writer whose work was selected for a New Zealand anthology. The Oxford Companion to New Zealand Literature said of her work:

The stories are succinct and lucid and on first reading they appear to embrace the era's dominant ethos—that New Zealanders were one nation—by avoiding specific reference to Māori. However, read against the grain of thought that expected, in Sturm's words, all Māori "to become respectable middle-class citizens, a lighter shade of brown, as it were", it becomes clear that the society she depicts fosters inequality, and her work conveys a strong and poignant sense of alienation. Her female narrators, although rarely defined by their race, are marginalised figures that give a vivid sense of the constriction and restrictions of a young woman's life in Wellington in the 1950s.

In the 1950s and until 1968, Sturm was active in Ngāti Poneke, a local cultural club for young Māori, and the Māori Women's Welfare League. She was secretary of the Wellington Branch of the League, and acted as the League's representative on the Māori Education Foundation Board for many years. She was the second woman to sit on the board and one of only two Māori appointees. In 1954, she wrote a detailed article about the work and history of the Māori Women's Welfare League in an article for Te Ao Hou / The New World.

In late 1954, Baxter joined Alcoholics Anonymous, successfully achieving sobriety, and in 1955, he graduated with a Bachelor of Arts from Victoria University College. He received a substantial inheritance from a great-aunt in the same year, so he and Sturm were able to purchase a house in Ngaio, Wellington. In 1957 Sturm and Baxter separated briefly after his conversion to Roman Catholicism, in part because she was a committed Anglican. Baxter admitted in a letter to a friend that his conversion was "just one more event in a series of injuries, alcoholism, and gross mistakes". They reunited the following year in Delhi, India, after Baxter accepted a UNESCO fellowship. After the family returned to New Zealand, Baxter worked for some years as a postman, and the family moved to Dunedin in 1966 so he could take up the Robert Burns Fellowship.

In 1968, and following the family's return to Wellington, Sturm and Baxter began living apart once again, as Baxter had founded and moved to a commune at Jerusalem, New Zealand (also known by its phonologically adapted Māori name, Hiruhārama) on the Whanganui River. Baxter wrote in a letter to his friend John Weir: "I must become a Maori in my heart – as I am already a little by love of my Maori wife – to help both Maori and pakeha. My wife will not come at first, for she has not seen the seed with the eyes of her soul. When the tree has grown, she will come to shelter under it." Sturm did not join Baxter at Jerusalem, and around this time began raising her granddaughter Stephanie, who was born in 1968. In an interview in 2006, Sturm said of this time: "... because of factors beyond my control, my private life took a right angle turn and I became a solo mum. And I thought, right, it's time to do a bit of pruning with your life and trim off all the fancy bits. So I pulled out of all the Māori activities that I was involved in – which included Ngāti Poneke and the Māori Education Foundation and the Māori Women's Welfare League. And the other thing that I had to drop was any writing, because survival was the name of the game and I had to get out and get a job."

In 1969, Sturm began working at the Wellington Public Library, where she continued working for 27 years. She was the librarian in charge of the New Zealand collection from 1969 to 1982. As one of the first Māori librarians, she was an advocate for other Māori librarians and spoke out against the (then) common practice of requiring Māori staff to be unofficial cultural advisers to their employers. After Baxter died in 1972, Sturm acted as his literary executor: collecting and cataloguing his prolific writing, arranging new and revised publications of his work, and negotiating the use and adaptation of his works. She set up the James K. Baxter Charitable Trust, which supported causes he had supported, for example prison reform and drug addiction rehabilitation programmes, and ensured that all proceeds of his work went to the trust.

== Return to the literary world ==
In 1982, well-known New Zealand author Witi Ihimaera selected two of Sturm's stories for inclusion in his anthology of Māori writing, Into the World of Light (1982). He had met her and come to know her through her work at the Wellington Public Library. In 1983, Sturm's collected short stories were published as The House of the Talking Cat by the women's publishing collective Spiral. The publication followed a suggestion by fellow writer Patricia Grace that the Women's Gallery invite Sturm to participate in a 1980 public reading; at that event, Auckland Women's Community Video recorded Sturm reading her short story "A Thousand and One Nights" and Marian Evans interviewing her.

The House of the Talking Cat was shortlisted in the New Zealand Book Awards and the stories were translated into German and Japanese. The stories had been written in the 1960s but Sturm had been unable to find a publisher for the collection. If she had, it would have been the first book of fiction in English published by any Māori writer, male or female. New Zealand author Janet Frame described the publication as "an event too long awaited and it's marvellous that it's happening at last".

Witi Ihimaera, in a review for the New Zealand Listener, called her "a pivotal presence in the Māori literary tradition", and speculated on the course Māori literature might have taken had Sturm and the book "achieved success and publication in their time, rather than twenty years later". A review in The Press noted that although written and set in the 1960s, "the stories retain an appeal partly because of the author's descriptive talent [and] because of her insight into people". The book was re-printed in 1986 and again in 2003. A review of the 1986 edition observed that the stories "are tautly crafted, detailed, and perceptive", and that New Zealand literature was poorer for Sturm's absence in the intervening years.

Sturm returned to writing poetry, and in 1996 published her first collection, Dedications. It was commercially successful and critically acclaimed, with poet Robert Sullivan calling it "a defining moment in New Zealand poetry". The book received an Honour Award for Poetry in the 1997 New Zealand Book Awards. The same year, twelve of Sturm's poems were included in the collection How Things Are. She published a further collection Postscripts in 2000, and the same year received the Kāpiti Lifetime Achievement Award. Both collections were illustrated by her son John.

In 1998, Sturm married university lecturer, critic and poet Peter Alcock, and they lived next door to each other in Paekākāriki. As a lecturer in English at Palmerston North University College, Alcock had advocated for New Zealand literature and promoted its study overseas. Baxter's friend John Weir said Sturm and Alcock "were good companions and had a mutually enriching relationship". Alcock died in 2007.

Sturm received an honorary Doctor of Literature degree from Victoria University in May 2003 in recognition of her "contribution to the visibility of Māori women in New Zealand literature" and her "pioneering role". A collection of her writing was published in 2006 as The Glass House: Stories and Poems. "The Glass House" was a short story Sturm had written in the early 1960s, but had not included in The House of the Talking Cat because it did not fit. Her poems in her later years were dedicated to family and friends, including Janet Frame, Jean Watson, and both her husbands.

In 2007, Wellington-based filmmaker Tim Rose directed a documentary about Sturm's life and career, entitled Broken Journey: The Life and Art of JC Sturm, which aired on Māori Television. Rose's family had lived next door to the Baxter family in Wellington and he described the documentary as "an intimate story of a long, well-lived life".

== Death and legacy ==
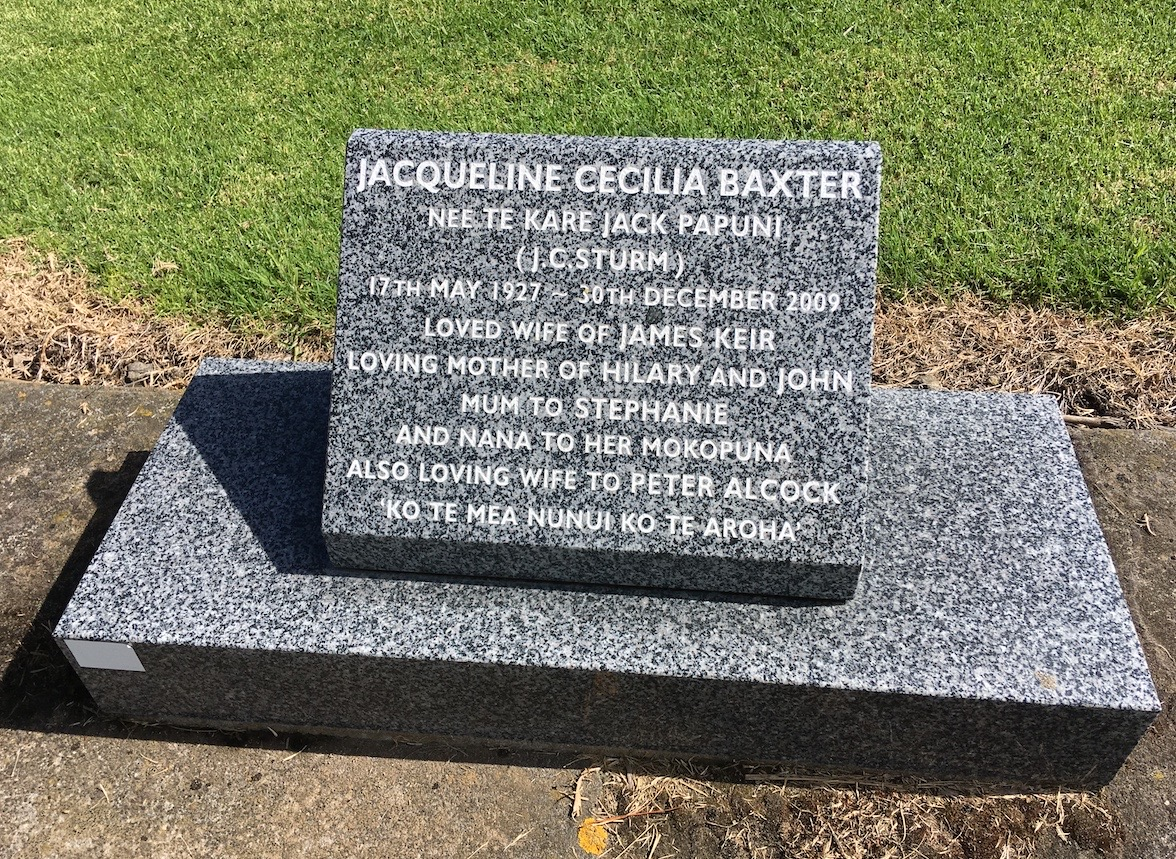
Sturm's grave at Ōpunake

Sturm died in Paekākāriki in December 2009, two months after the death of her beloved granddaughter Stephanie. A tangi was held at Ōrimupiko marae and she is buried at Ōpunake alongside her mother and great-grandmother. In January 2010, a memorial service was held at Paekākāriki Memorial Hall, attended by nearly 200 people and with tributes from a number of well-known New Zealand artists including Glenn Colquhoun, Patricia Grace, Apirana Taylor and Hinemoana Baker.

Sturm was a pioneer of New Zealand literature, and paved the way for later female Māori writers like Patricia Grace and Keri Hulme. Witi Ihimaera described her as one of the three women he considered his elders when he began writing; they were "like spinners working on a loom" who began "spinning the tradition from which all contemporary Maori writers come". Her entry in the Dictionary of New Zealand Biography notes that, despite being overshadowed for much of her life by her first husband, she "emerged in later life as a unique and important voice in New Zealand literature in her own right". In an obituary, New Zealand poet and scholar Paul Millar wrote: "Her output may seem modest on paper, but it becomes substantial when set against the obstacles placed before her as a woman, wife, and mother and, for many years, her family’s primary earner. Although Jacquie Baxter never wanted to be a role model, she never shirked her responsibility as a voice for Maori people and a campaigner against racial inequality. Her life and writing are testament to a woman of great integrity and quiet courage who helped clear the path that younger writers have followed to greater success and recognition."

In December 2019, Wellington artists Mata Aho Collective and Andre Te Hira installed artwork over temporary fencing at the Wellington Central Library featuring Sturm's poem "On The Building Site for a New Library", published in Dedications (1996). The work was printed on adhesive vinyl, and installed in vertical strips along the temporary fencing. It was designed to remain in place for at least a year. A 2022 survey of librarians in Wellington identified this poem as their second favourite New Zealand poem.

In February 2021, the website Poetry Shelf published an audio recording of New Zealand poet Karlo Mila reading her poem "Letter to J.C. Sturm" from her collection Goddess Muscle (2020).

In May 2021, Paul Millar, together with Sturm's son John Baxter and publisher Roger Steele, found some of Sturm's early work from the 1940s, including unpublished poems. The poem "Brown Optimism", which may have been published in a student newspaper, was subsequently published on the website The Spinoff. Millar noted that the poem "rejects the status quo and demands equality for Māori". In 2025, the poem was selected by Rangi Kipa to be installed on the outside wall of the redesigned Wellington Central Library.

== Selected works ==
=== Short stories ===
- "The Old Coat" (1954)
- "For All the Saints" (1955)
- The House of the Talking Cat (1983) (collection)

=== Poetry ===
- Dedications (1996)
- How Things Are (1996, with Adrienne Jansen, Harry Ricketts and Meg Campbell)
- Postscripts (2000)
- The Glass House (2006)
