= Miriama Evans =

New Zealand civil servant and publisher

- Evans, 2005
- Born: 19 February 1944; Christchurch, New Zealand
- Died: 15 August 2018 (aged 74)
- Occupations: Civil servant; publisher

Miriama Evans (19 February 1944 – 15 August 2018) was a New Zealand civil servant and publisher.

== Biography ==
Evans was born in Christchurch in 1944; her father was a member of the Ngāti Mutunga iwi (tribe) and her mother a member of Ngāi Tahu. She attended Linwood High School where she was one of four Māori students in a roll of more than 1000. In her final year she was head girl of the school.

After finishing high school, she worked as a travel officer at the Government Tourist Bureau but resigned to marry and have children. The family moved to Wellington and Evans studied at Victoria University of Wellington, completing a master's degree in Māori Studies.

Evans began working in government departments, including the Ministry of Women's Affairs, the Ministry of Justice, and the Department of the Prime Minister and Cabinet. Evans held governance roles in a number of organisations; she was a member of the Waitangi Tribunal, a member of Te Aka Matua Māori Advisory for Victoria University and the national advisor to St John New Zealand on Māori health. She also served in her iwi (tribe)'s educational organisation, Te Runanga o Ngāti Mutungā, for 20 years.

Evans retired from the civil service in 2005. She continue to work, lecturing at Victoria University on policy development and its impacts on Māori society.

=== Publications ===
In 1983 she was one of the Spiral Collective, a group of three women who published Keri Hulme's book The Bone People. The book went on to win the Booker Prize in 1985. Evans was a co-editor of The Penguin Book of Contemporary New Zealand Poetry, Ngā Kupu Tïtohu o Aotearoa, which was published in 1989.

In 2006, Evans and her sister Rānui Ngārimu produced The Art of Māori Weaving, a book based on an exhibition of Māori weaving at Pātaka Museum in Porirua. The book was a finalist in the Montana Book Awards. In 2025, the book was listed in Books of Mana as one of the 180 most significant works of Māori-authored non-fiction.

=== Recognition ===
In 2016 Evans was awarded the Hunter Fellowship by Victoria University for her commitment to Māori development at the university. After her death, the university established a Miriama Evans Memorial Scholarship to acknowledge her service to Ngāti Mutunga and the university.
