= Spiral (publisher) =

New Zealand women's publisher and art collective (1975–)

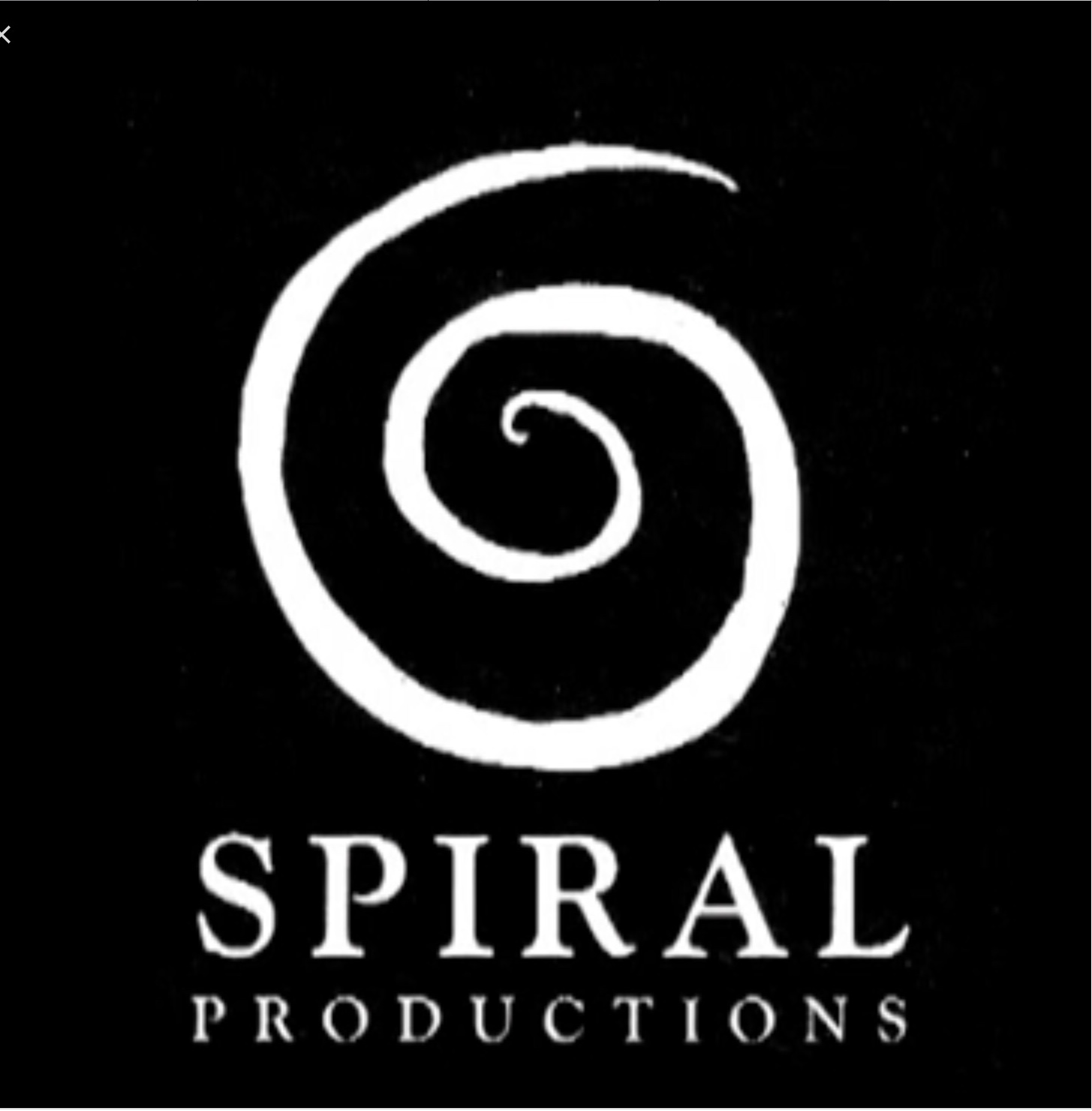
- Logo from Sister Galvan, still used but without the text
- Founded: 1975
- Country of origin: New Zealand
- Publication types: Women's art and literature
- Official website: www.spiralcollectives.org

Spiral, also known as Spiral Collective or Spiral Collectives, is a New Zealand publisher and group of artist collectives established in 1975 with a focus on female artists and voices. Members of Spiral have published and created a number of projects and works including, notably, the Spiral journal (seven issues published from 1976 to 1992), A Figurehead: A Face (1982) by Heather McPherson, The House of the Talking Cat (1983) by J.C. Sturm, the bone people (1984) by Keri Hulme (the first New Zealand novel to win the Booker Prize), numerous art exhibitions and documentary films.

== Background and Spiral journal ==
Spiral was originally founded in 1975 in Christchurch by a group of women including Heather McPherson, Paulette Barr, Allie Eagle (also known as Alison Mitchell) and Kathryn Algie. McPherson had formed a Women Artists Group in order to encourage women writers and artists, and Spiral grew out of this group and out of the women's liberation movement. Their goal was to publish a literary journal for and by women. The first issue, Spiral 1 (1976) was printed by Wellington-based feminist press Herstory Press, and was described by newspaper The Press as containing "poetry, prints, literary criticism, and thoughts on women's special place in the world of art". The collective described itself in the second issue as follows:

We are a collective of Christchurch women with a feminist perspective eager to provide New Zealand women with a literary/arts journal which is a forum for their own thoughts, feelings, attitudes in a nuturant supportive atmosphere.

Many of those involved in Spiral participated in women's activism more widely, which influenced the art produced by the group. A letter published in an early issue suggested that work should be accepted on merit rather than limited to work by women only; in response, McPherson said she supported positive discrimination for women and noted the barriers faced by women to publication in most magazines.

Six more issues of Spiral followed between 1977 and 1992, and contained poetry, essays, letters, paintings, drawings, photographs, short stories and other artworks. Different groups of women throughout New Zealand took responsibility for each publication, meaning that the issues varied in formatting and appearance. The first four issues were published in Christchurch, the fifth in Wellington, the sixth in the Coromandel and the final issue by a New Zealand-wide group. Local printers were used and women's bookstores and communities helped distribute the issues throughout the community. The magazine at times faced financial difficulties and was supported through fundraising efforts like poetry readings. The collective became a floating imprint used by different feminist groups.

In 1977, artist Joanna Paul, an early member of Spiral, connected a number of artists including McPherson, Eagle, Gladys Gurney (also known as Saj Gurney), Anna Keir, Bridie Lonie and Marian Evans in Wellington, with her project "A Season's Diaries". This project developed into the Women's Gallery, a Wellington art gallery focussing on the expression of women's everyday lives through art. Spiral was closely connected with the Women's Gallery which was itself run as a collective, and with children's book publishing collective Kidsarus 2. The latter published Patricia Grace's well-known picture book, Kuia and the Spider / Te Kuia me te Pungawerewere (1981), in both English and Māori. Although the gallery closed in 1984, the Women's Gallery Incorporated charity continued until 2005 and was a fiscal sponsor for Spiral's projects.

In 1982, the members of the Wellington collective that had published Spiral 5 (including Evans and Keir) decided that Spiral would become a publisher of books that were unable to find traditional publishers.

== Book publishing ==
Spiral published seven books between 1982 and 1987, including notably A Figurehead: A Face (1982), a collection of poetry by McPherson (the first collection of poetry published in New Zealand by an out lesbian), The House of the Talking Cat (1983) by J.C. Sturm and the bone people (1984) by Keri Hulme. In 2021, Emma Espiner commented: "If you consider the history of New Zealand writing, it is both frightening and inspiring how influential the Spiral collective has been."

the bone people had been rejected by several mainstream publishers who wanted Hulme to make significant changes to the work. The stories in The House of the Talking Cat had been written and collected by Sturm between the 1940s and mid-1960s but she had been unable to find a publisher at the time. Marian Evans, a member of Spiral, said that both works "were part of significant community-based conversations and needed to be out in the world". The publication of both works was carried out by collectives of two Māori women and one Pākehā woman. An early review of the bone people by New Zealand writer and academic Peter Simpson commented that it was appropriate for the book to be published by Spiral because "the spiral form is central to the novel's meaning and design; it is in effect the code of the work informing every aspect from innumerable local details to the overall structure". It was an immediate success, with the first edition selling out in weeks, and became the first New Zealand novel to win the Booker Prize in 1985.

In early 2018, a collective of Spiral members Janet Charman, Lynne Ciochetto and Marian Evans published a collection of poetry by McPherson, who had died in 2017, called This Joyous, Chaotic Place: Garden Poems. The collection was published as part of an exhibition called "This Joyous, Chaotic Place: He Waiata Tangi-ā-Tahu", relating to McPherson and other colleagues at Mokopōpaki, an Auckland dealer gallery with Māori values at its centre. The event included the screening of 1980 interviews by McPherson and Sturm, and was a project that formed part of the celebrations in New Zealand marking 125 years since women's suffrage. Francis McWhannell, reviewing for The Pantographic Punch, commented: "As the title suggests, the exhibition is raucous, celebratory, even as it acknowledges marginalisation, oppression, and violence. It serves to remind us of the roots of contemporary feminist movements like #metoo." In 2019 Mokopōpaki and Spiral co-published This Joyous, Chaotic Place: He Waiata Tangi-ā-Tahu, a substantial exhibition catalogue, described by magazine Art New Zealand as "a significant addition to this country's literary and artistic landscape".

In 2018, Spiral assisted Automática Editorial with the publication of a Spanish edition of the bone people.

== Other activities ==
In 1984, the group were represented by Bub Bridger at the inaugural International Feminist Book Fair in London. The group was subsequently able to attend the second such fair in Oslo in 1986, with attendees including McPherson, Arapera Blank, Irihapeti Ramsden, Sturm, Patricia Grace, Stephanie Baxter and Marian Evans. Ramsden and Evans attended the third fair in Barcelona in 1990.

From 1997 to 2009, the group ran a video project called Getting Free, about resilience following violation. The project was led by Evans and Bridie Lonie. Participants included gay artist Galvan Macnamara, Irihapeti Ramsden, Allie Eagle and her mother Lorna Mitchell, and Wai Turoa Morgan. A similar audio-only history project was supported by Lonie and Juanita Ketchel in Dunedin. The interviews with Macnamara were developed into a feature-length documentary film, Sister Galvan (2003). In September 2003, Spiral organised a presentation of 50 short films, documentaries and other works by New Zealand women directors at City Gallery Wellington, called Mahi Ata Mahi Ahua: Women's Work in Film.

In early 2016, Evans established an online publication called Spiral Collectives on the website platform Medium to provide information about Spiral's history, including articles by McPherson and other founders.

In 2026, Spiral's 50th anniversary was marked with a public exhibition at the Reed Gallery, Dunedin Public Library, and by the publication of Spiral 8: Setting the [work] table and Some Stories.

== Selected publications ==
- Heather McPherson, A Figurehead: A Face (poetry), Wellington, 1982.
- J. C. Sturm, The House of the Talking Cat (short story collection), Wellington, 1983.
- Keri Hulme, the bone people (novel), Wellington, 1984.
- Irihapeti Ramsden, Marian Evans, Miriama Evans, Wahine Kaituhi: Women Writers of Aotearoa New Zealand (catalogue), Wellington, 1985.
- Marina Bachmann, Janet Charman and Sue Fitchett, Drawing Together (poetry), Auckland, 1985.
- Hilary Baxter, The Other Side of Dawn (poetry), Wellington, 1987.
- Saj Gurney, Amazon Songs (poetry), Wellington, 1987.
- Bridie Lonie, Marian Evans and Tilly Lloyd (editors), A Women's Picture Book: 25 Women Artists of Aotearoa New Zealand (art), Spiral/GP Books, Wellington, 1988.
- Heather McPherson, Julie King, Pamela Gerrish Nunn and Marian Evans (editors), Spiral 7: A Collection of Lesbian Art and Writing (anthology), Wellington, 1992.
- Sue Fitchett and Jane Zusters, Charts & Soundings: Some Small Navigation Aids (poetry and photographs), Wellington, 1999.
- Frances Cherry, Washing Up in Parrot Bay (novel), Steele Roberts in association with Spiral, Wellington, 1999.
- Spiral Collectives, Sister Galvan (feature documentary), Wellington, 2003.
- Heather McPherson, This Joyous, Chaotic Place: Garden Poems (poetry), Wellington, 2018.
- This Joyous, Chaotic Place: He Waiata Tangi-ā-Tahu (exhibition catalogue), Mokopōpaki/Spiral, Auckland, 2019.
- Marian Evans, Women's Film Festivals Around the World & #womeninfilm Databases (eBook), Wellington, 2021.
- Heather McPherson, i do not cede, edited and with an introduction by Emer Lyons (chapbook, eBook), Wellington, 2022.
- Spiral Collectives, Keri Hulme: Our Kuru Pounamu (eBook), Wellington, 2022.
