= John Baxter (artist) =

New Zealand artist

John Baxter (29 October 1952 – 3 April 2026) was a New Zealand artist.

== Life ==
Baxter was born in Wellington on 29 October 1952, the son of poet James K. Baxter and writer Jacquie Sturm. He affiliates to Taranaki and Te Whakatōhea, and through his mother's whakapapa connects to Te Ātiawa. His parents ensured he was involved in Māori cultural activities as a child, including attending te reo Māori evening classes in Wellington.

In 2024 an exhibition of Baxter's work was on display at Toi Mahara in Waikanae, New Zealand.

== Practice ==
Baxter has described his approach to art as posing questions or making observations rather than making statements, saying he tries to see the world "in an objective and questioning way, trying not to be too judgemental but indicating that this or that need[s] to be looked at." His work explores New Zealand's bicultural history and society. Toi Mahara director Janet Bayly said she had long felt Baxter's paintings would be a fitting exhibition for the gallery.

== Death ==
Baxter died on 3 April 2026, at the age of 73.
