= The Bone People =

1984 novel by Keri Hulme

- First edition cover
- Author: Keri Hulme
- Cover artist: Cover design by Basia Smolnicki, cover illustration by Keri Hulme
- Language: English
- Publisher: Spiral
- Publication date: February 1984
- Publication place: New Zealand
- Media type: Print (hardback & paperback)
- Pages: 450 pp (paperback edition)
- ISBN: 0-9597593-2-8 (first edition)
- OCLC: 36312027

The Bone People, styled by the writer and in some editions as the bone people, is a 1984 novel by New Zealand writer Keri Hulme. Set on the coast of the South Island of New Zealand, the novel focuses on three characters, all of whom are isolated in different ways: a reclusive artist, a mute child, and the child's foster father. Over the course of the novel the trio develop a tentative relationship, are driven apart by violence, and reunite. Māori and Pākehā (New Zealand European) culture, myths and language are blended through the novel. The novel has polarised critics and readers, with some praising the novel for its power and originality, while others have criticised Hulme's writing style and portrayals of violence.

Hulme spent many years working on the novel, but was unable to find a mainstream publisher willing to accept the book without significant editing; it was eventually published by the small all-women collective, Spiral. After initial commercial success in New Zealand, the book was published overseas and became the first New Zealand novel and first debut novel to win the Booker Prize in 1985, although not without controversy; two of the five judges opposed the book's choice for its portrayals of child abuse and violence. Nevertheless, the novel has remained popular into the 21st century, continuing to sell well in New Zealand and overseas, and is widely recognised as a New Zealand literary classic.

== Plot summary ==
Kerewin lives in a tower overlooking the sea on the coast of the South Island. She is isolated from her family and interacts little with the local community, but is able to live independently after winning a lottery and investing well. On a stormy afternoon, a young child, Simon, appears at the tower. He is mute and communicates with Kerewin through hand signals and notes. He is picked up the next morning by a family friend; later that evening Simon's foster father, Joe, visits Kerewin to thank her for looking after Simon. After a freak storm years earlier, Simon was found washed up on the beach with very few clues as to his identity. Despite Simon's mysterious background, Joe and his wife Hana took the boy in. Later, Joe's infant son and Hana both died, forcing Joe to bring the troubled and troublesome Simon up on his own.

Kerewin finds herself developing a tentative relationship with the boy and his father. Gradually it becomes clear that Simon is a deeply traumatised child, whose strange behaviours Joe is unable to cope with. Kerewin discovers that, in spite of the real familial love between them, Joe is physically abusing Simon. Horrified, she initially says nothing to Joe, but suggests they travel to her family's bach (holiday home) by the beach for a break. Early on in their stay she confronts Joe and asks him to go easier on Simon. Joe and Kerewin argue, and after Simon spits at Joe, she intervenes to stop Joe from beating him, using her aikido skills. Following the incident, Joe promises not to beat Simon without her permission. They spend the rest of their time at the beach fishing, talking and drinking.

After returning home from the holiday, Simon sees the aftermath of a violent death and seeks Kerewin out for support, but she is angry with him for stealing one of her prized possessions. Simon reacts by punching her; she instinctively hits him in the chest and in response he kicks in the side of her guitar, a gift from her estranged mother. Kerewin tells him to get out. Simon goes to the town and breaks a series of shop windows, and when he is returned home by the police Joe calls Kerewin, who gives Joe permission to beat the child (but tells him not to "overdo it"). Joe beats Simon severely, believing he has driven Kerewin away. Simon, who has concealed a shard of glass from a shop window, stabs his father. Both are hospitalised, with Simon falling into a coma. Joe is released quickly but sent to prison for three months for child abuse, and in the meantime Kerewin leaves town and demolishes her tower.

Simon eventually recovers, albeit with some loss of hearing and brain damage, and is sent to live in foster care against his wishes. He is unhappy and continually runs away, trying to get back to Joe and Kerewin. After Joe's release from prison, he travels aimlessly. He jumps off a cliff and nearly kills himself, but is rescued by a dying kaumātua (respected elder) who says he has been waiting for Joe. He asks Joe to take over guardianship of a sacred waka (canoe), containing the spirit of a god, which Joe accepts. In the meantime, Kerewin becomes seriously ill with stomach pains. Although she visits a doctor who says he is concerned it may be stomach cancer, she refuses to allow him to investigate further and insists he write her a prescription for sleeping pills. After several weeks in a mountain cabin, on the point of death, she is visited by a spirit of some kind and cured.

Kerewin returns to her community and takes custody of Simon. Joe also returns, bringing with him the sacred spirit. Without Kerewin's knowledge or permission, he contacts Kerewin's family, resulting in a joyous reconciliation. The final scene of the novel depicts the reunion of Kerewin, Simon and Joe, celebrating with family and friends back at the beach where Kerewin has rebuilt the old marae (communal meeting house) and rebuilt her home, not as a tower but in the shape of a shell with many spirals.

== Themes and characters ==
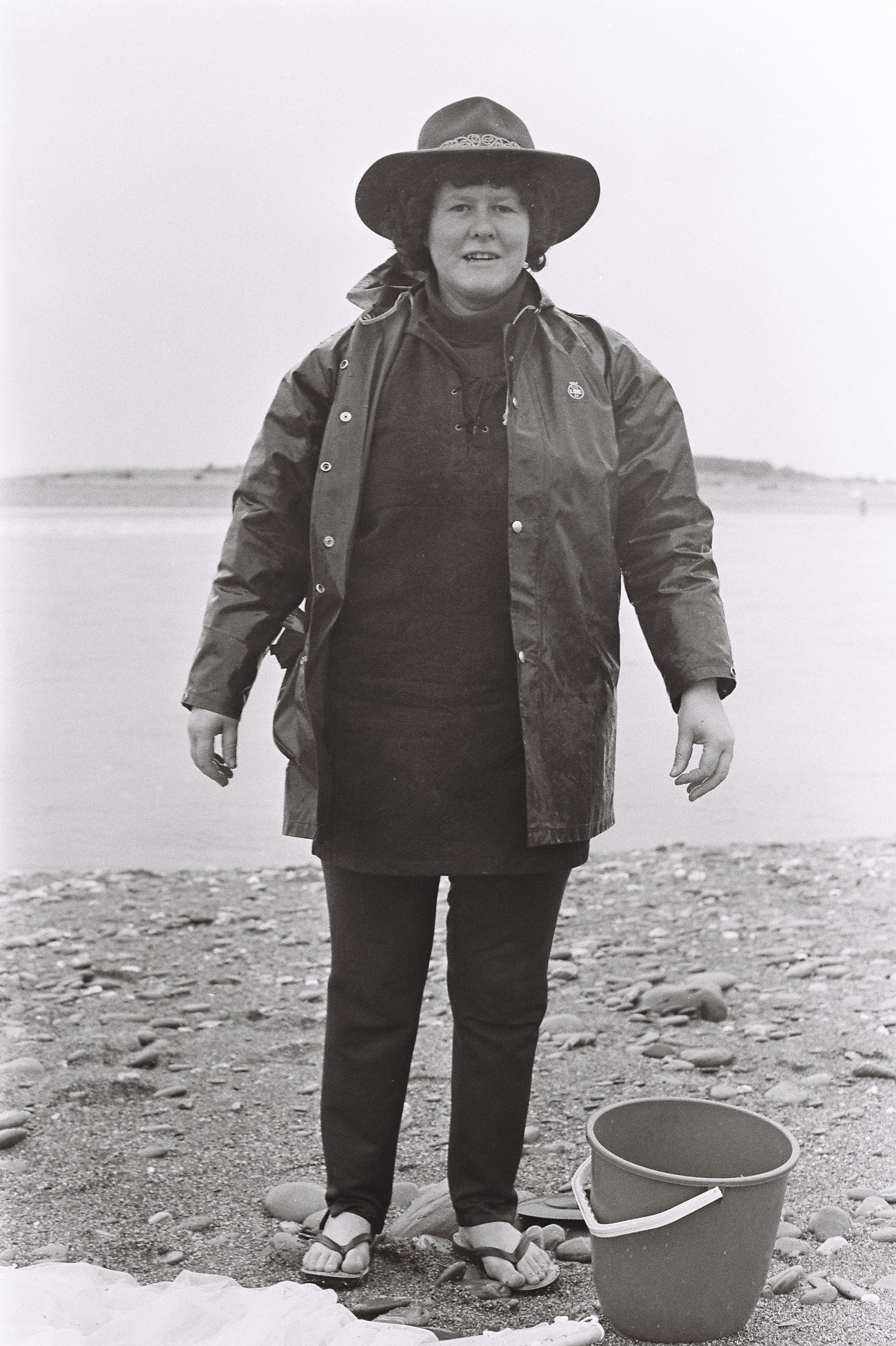
Author Keri Hulme with a catch of whitebait at Ōkārito; the character Kerewin Holmes has similarities to Hulme

The novel focuses on three main characters, all of whom are isolated in different ways. In the short prologue at the start of the novel, the then-unnamed characters are described as "nothing more than people by themselves", but together "the hearts and muscles and mind of something perilous and new, the instruments of change". The three characters are:

- Kerewin Holmes – Kerewin lives in an isolated tower by the sea, estranged from her family and community. She is part-Māori, part-Pākehā, and asexual. She is skilled, knowledgeable and creative, but although seeing herself as a painter finds herself unable to paint. At the outset of the novel she spends her days fishing and drinking. She is often preparing food or eating, which links the novel to traditional Māori storytelling themes of food and its preparation. She has been described as a "clear stand-in for the author". Hulme said that Holmes began as an alter-ego character but "escaped out of my control and developed a life of her own".
- Simon P. Gillayley – Simon is a mute child, aged six or seven, with an immense interest in details of the world around him. Simon has a deep attachment to both Joe and Kerewin, but he shows his love in odd ways. He exhibits a disregard for personal property. He is isolated from others by his inability to speak, and others mistake his muteness for stupidity. His life before meeting Joe is never described in detail, although it is hinted that he was abused before meeting Joe. He is Pākehā, with blonde hair and blue eyes.
- Joe Gillayley – Joe is Simon's foster father. His alcoholism clouds his judgement, particularly in his raising of Simon, whom he physically abuses. Joe seems to both love and respect Kerewin, but also to compete with her. He is deeply scarred and isolated by the death of his wife and infant child, and he is disconnected from his Māori heritage.

The relationship between these three troubled characters is characterised by violence and difficulty in communicating. Violence, pain and suffering appear frequently in the novel, most notably through Joe's beating of Simon, but also through the characters' spiritual pain and isolation. Both Kerewin and Joe are estranged from their Māori heritage and identity, and both have lost their families. All three characters experience near-death experiences over the course of the novel. Some critics have described Simon as a Christ-like figure in his suffering and his salvation of Joe and Kerewin, although Hulme herself has rejected this comparison, saying "none of his suffering is for anyone else".

Over the course of the novel the three characters bond and become "the bone people". In Māori, the term iwi, usually referring to a tribal group, literally means "bone". Thus, in the novel, Simon imagines Joe saying the phrase "E nga iwi o nga iwi", which the book's glossary explains: "It means, O the bones of the people (where "bones" stands for ancestors or relations), or, O the people of the bones (i.e. the beginning people, the people who make another people)." Each character represents aspects of New Zealand's racial culture. Through their love of Simon and acceptance of Māori myth into their lives, Joe and Kerewin are able to transform themselves. The Oxford Companion to New Zealand Literature describes the three as becoming "a new multicultural group, founded on Māori spirituality and traditional ritual, who offer transformative hope to a country stunted by the violence of its divided colonial legacy".

The relationship between Joe and Kerewin is not a sexual one, although Joe does consider Kerewin as a possible partner and the two form a close bond that is akin to a romantic relationship or a parental one with Simon. At the end of the book Joe and Simon take her last name, not for sentimental reasons but for what Kerewin describes as "good legal sense". Critic C.K. Stead has said he considers this to be the "imaginative strength" of the work: "that it creates a sexual union where no sex occurs, creates parental love where there are no physical parents, creates the stress and fusion of a family where there is no actual family".

The spiral form frequently appears as a symbol throughout the novel, and is linked to the koru as an "old symbol of rebirth" in Māori culture. An early review by New Zealand writer and academic Peter Simpson noted how particularly apt it was for the book to have been published by the Spiral collective, because "the spiral form is central to the novel's meaning and design; it is in effect the code of the work informing every aspect from innumerable local details to the overall structure". It represents the sense of community, cultural integration and open-endedness that gives the characters hope at the end of the novel.

== Style ==
The novel is divided into four sections of three parts each, loosely covering the four seasons of a year. Much of the narration is from the perspective of Kerewin, and predominantly in the third-person, but some sections are told from the perspective of Joe or Simon, including those sections which relate to Joe's violent beating of Simon. The prose is often in a stream of consciousness or poetic style denoting characters' inner thoughts. It also incorporates use of the Māori language, usually untranslated in the text, but with a glossary at the back of the book. The novel frequently features the dreams of the three characters, and in the final section the narrative shifts from realism to mysticism.

The Oxford Companion to New Zealand Literature observes that the novel requires active concentration from the reader, given the mixture of poetry and prose, New Zealand slang and Māori phrases, realistic and supernatural elements, and tonal shifts from ordinary and banal to lyrical and sacred. Judith Dale, in a review for Landfall, describes Hulme's writing as "highly idiosyncratic, often florid, with a wide lexical range"; the book "abounds with literary allusions, arcane references and a self-conscious use of language that depends on wide and esoteric reading". Merata Mita describes the writing as "reminiscent of musical patterns in jazz".

== Publication history ==
As a teenager in the mid-1960s, Hulme began writing short stories about a mute child called Simon Peter. She continued to write about this character and develop the material which would eventually form a novel into adulthood, while working a series of short seasonal jobs such as tobacco-picking and later working as a journalist and television producer. The novel's two other key characters, Kerewin Holmes and Joe Gillayley, were developed at a later stage.

When Hulme began submitting her draft novel to publishers, she was told to trim it down and rewrite it; she reworked the manuscript seven times, with some assistance from her mother on editing the early chapters. In 1973 she moved to Ōkārito, on the West Coast of the South Island, where the book was completed. At least four publishers rejected the novel; at least two did not refuse it outright but required it to be edited significantly. Hulme refused, however, to allow them to "go through [her] work with shears". In rejecting the manuscript, William Collins, Sons wrote: "Undoubtedly Miss Hulme can write but unfortunately we don't understand what she is writing about."

Hulme had almost given up on publication when she met Marian Evans, a founder of the Women's Gallery and a member of the women's publishing collective Spiral. She later recorded that she had reached the point of deciding to embalm the manuscript in resin and use it as a doorstop. In 1981, Hulme sent Evans a copy of the manuscript, which Evans passed onto Māori leaders Miriama Evans (no relation to Marian) and Irihapeti Ramsden. Both Miriama and Ramsden saw the book as a Māori novel, with Ramsden comparing Hulme's writing to her childhood experiences of listening to Māori elders share oral traditions and stories. They decided to publish the work as a Spiral collective, on a limited budget but with help from other supporters and institutions. It was typeset by the Victoria University of Wellington Students' Association, and proofread by members of Spiral (Marian later acknowledged that the proofreading "was uneven, dependent on the skills of various helpers"). The novel's publication was also supported by a couple of small grants from the New Zealand Literary Fund.

The first edition, a print-run of 2,000 copies published in February 1984, sold out in weeks. After the second edition sold out similarly quickly, Spiral collaborated with English publishing house Hodder & Stoughton to co-publish the third edition. A further 20,000 copies were sold of this edition. The first American edition was published by Louisiana State University Press in 1985. The novel has been translated into nine languages (Dutch, Norwegian, German, Swedish, Finnish, Slovak, French, Danish and Spanish). In 2010 it was one of six novels comprising Penguin Books' Ink series, a subset of 75 titles re-released in celebration of the publishing house's 75th anniversary, each with jacket art "specially designed by some of the world's best artists working in the world of tattoos and illustration". The cover features art by New Zealand tattoo artist Pepa Heller.

== Reception ==
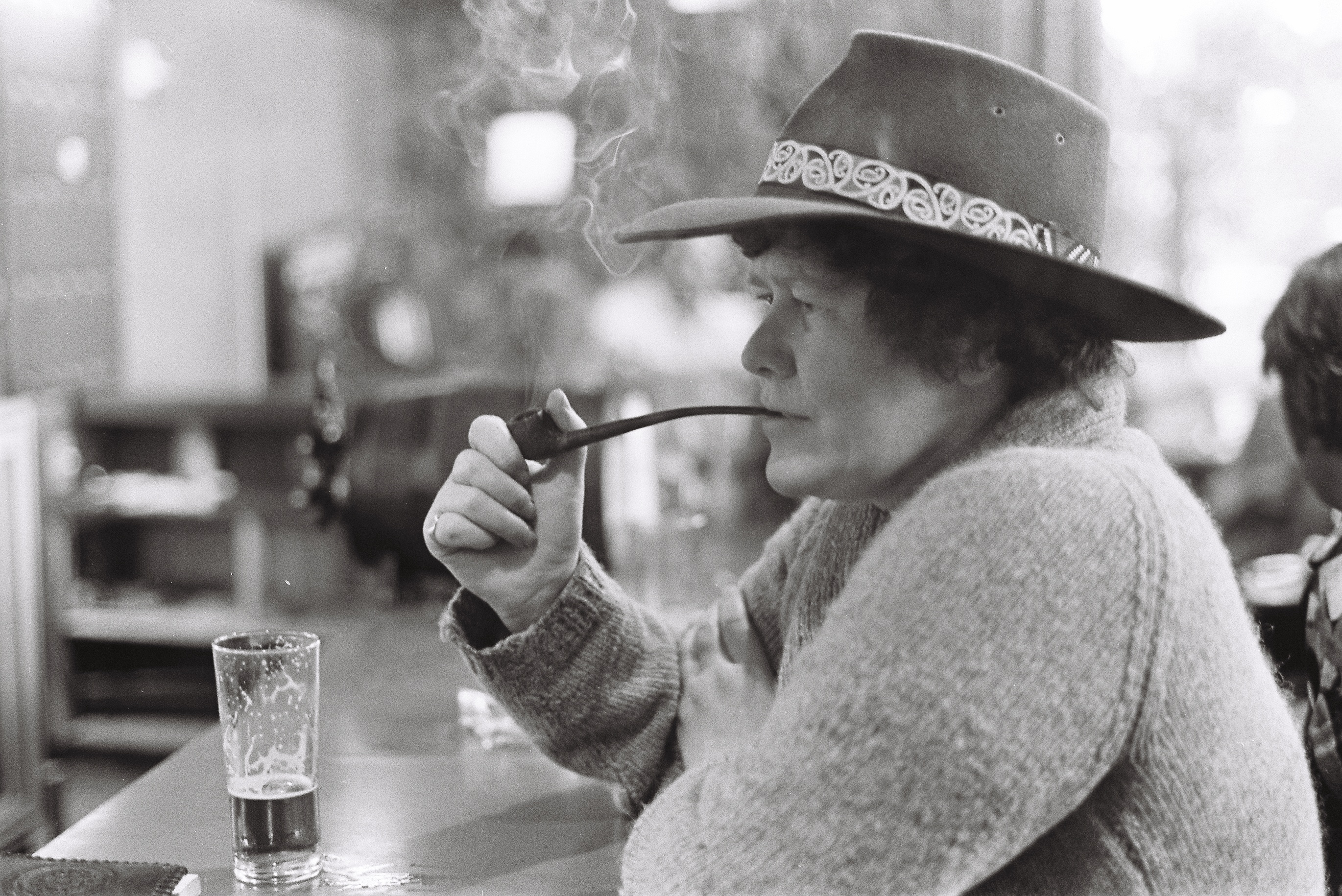
Author Keri Hulme in 1983

The novel polarised readers and reviewers, receiving both critical acclaim and strong criticism. The Oxford Companion to New Zealand Literature considers that the novel "must be acknowledged as one of contemporary New Zealand literature's most powerful rewritings of the ideology of nationalism and a prophetic vision of New Zealand's multicultural future." It was praised by authors such as Alice Walker, who said in a letter to Spiral that it "is just amazingly wondrously great", and fellow New Zealand author Witi Ihimaera, who said he "was totally amazed that a book that I knew had been put together by a small feminist publication company had made it to the top of the literary world". Publisher Fergus Barrowman said: "It was fantastic, unlike anything else. It completely enlivened and altered my sense of New Zealand literature."

On the other hand, some reviewers have criticised the book's style and Hulme's writing. Agnes-Mary Brooke, writing for The Press, called it "grandiose, inflated nonsense". Fleur Adcock said it was "hard to be sure whether this remarkable novel is a masterpiece or just a glorious mess"; in response, Judith Dale asked whether the novel's unsettled structure formed part of the appeal: "Mystery or muddle, mess or masterpiece, is it precisely the unresolved, unsettling, unsettled and dissolving strands of the bone people which make up its attraction for other readers as for me?" More recently, Sam Jordison, reviewing the book in 2009 for The Guardian, described Hulme's writing as a "morass of bad, barely comprehensible prose", and felt that by the end of the novel "the-all-too realistic story of abuse and trauma breaks down into absurd mysticism".

New Zealand academic and writer C. K. Stead suggested in a 1985 article that Hulme should not be identified as a Māori writer, on the basis that she was only one-eighth Māori. He praised the novel however for its "imaginative strength" and said it was at its core "a work of great simplicity and power"; years later he described the work as "New Zealand's finest novel". His views on Hulme's identity were controversial, with other critics at the time calling them racist and reactionary. Hulme said in response to Stead's comments on her racial identity that he was "wrong, on all counts". In 1991 Hulme and other authors withdrew stories from an anthology Stead was engaged to edit, with Hulme citing his "extensive history of insult and attack that surrounds [his] relations with Maori and Polynesian writers".

Stead and other critics have called attention to the way that the novel describes Simon being violently abused, yet also treats the perpetrator, Joe, as a sympathetic character. Stead criticised the novel for its portrayals of violence and child abuse; in his words, the book leaves "a bitter aftertaste, something black and negative deeply ingrained in its imaginative fabric". In response, other critics have said the child abuse in the novel is allegorical, and that the violence is condemned by characters in the novel including by Joe himself. Merata Mita observed that Joe's violence towards Simon reflects the colonial violence inflicted by the British on the Māori people. Hulme herself has said she wanted to draw attention to the problem of child abuse in New Zealand, which is often not spoken about.

The novel received praise from overseas publications. The Washington Post called it a novel of "sweeping power" and an "original, overwhelming, near-great work of literature, which does not merely shed light on a small but complex and sometimes misunderstood country, but also, more generally, enlarges our sense of life's possible dimensions". Peter Kemp in The Sunday Times concluded that "for all its often harrowing subject-matter, this first novel from a New Zealand writer radiates vitality ... New Zealand's people, its heritage and landscapes are conjured up with uncanny poetry and perceptiveness". Claudia Tate for The New York Times called the novel "provocative", and said it "summons power with words, as in a conjurer's spell".

== Awards ==
In 1984, the novel won the New Zealand Book Award for Fiction. The following year it won the Pegasus Prize for Literature, which that year had been earmarked for Māori fiction by Mobil who sponsored the Pegasus Prize and the Te Maori exhibition in New York in 1984. It subsequently became the first New Zealand novel and first debut novel to win the Booker Prize.

The judges of the 1985 Booker Prize were Norman St John-Stevas, Joanna Lumley, Marina Warner, Nina Bawden and Jack Walter Lambert. The judges were split on The Bone People as winner: Lumley and Bawden opposed it, with Lumley arguing that the book's subject matter of child abuse was "indefensible", "no matter how lyrically written". The other three were in favour; Warner considered it "a really extraordinary achievement, a very, very unusual piece of writing, the writing on every page springs surprises". St John-Stevas, who sat as chairman of the judging panel, said it was a "a highly poetic book, filled with striking imagery and insights".

Hulme was unable to attend the Booker Prize ceremony as she was in the United States at the time on a promotional tour following her receipt of the Pegasus Prize. She was called from the awards ceremony, and her response (broadcast live on television) was, "You're pulling my leg, aren't you? Bloody hell." Irihapeti Ramsden, Marian Evans and Miriama Evans of Spiral attended the ceremony itself on her behalf. They recited a karanga (Māori call) as they accepted the award, which led to Philip Purser of The Sunday Telegraph describing them as "a posse of keening harpies". The reaction to the win was generally one of surprise; it was described by Philip Howard for The Sunday Times as a "dark horse" and a "controversial choice", and by The Guardian as "the strangest novel ever to win the Booker".

When asked what the Booker Prize meant to her, Hulme said: "The difference will be having a large amount of money and being able to keep doing the things I like – reading, writing, painting, fishing and building." David Lange, prime minister at the time, sent her a congratulatory telegram, ending with: No reira, e te puawai o Aotearoa, e mihi aroha ki a koe ("And so, to you, a flower of Aotearoa, this loving greeting").

== Legacy ==
The novel's popularity has endured into the 21st century; in 2004, it remained in the New Zealand fiction bestseller list. In 2005, a public conference was held at the Stout Research Centre at Victoria University of Wellington to mark 20 years since the Booker Prize win. In 2006, the novel was voted New Zealand's favourite book in a public poll as part of the inaugural NZ Book Month. In 2018, it came third in two separate polls by The Spinoff of the favourite New Zealand books of readers and literary experts respectively. It is the favourite novel of New Zealand prime minister Jacinda Ardern. In 2022, it was included on the "Big Jubilee Read" list of 70 books by Commonwealth authors, selected to celebrate the Platinum Jubilee of Elizabeth II.

Hulme died in December 2021. Her New York Times obituary reported that the book had at that time sold over 1.2 million copies. In July 2022, her family announced that the original novel manuscript would be sold at auction, with the proceeds to be used to support Māori authors, in accordance with Hulme's final wishes. The estimated sale price was NZ$35,000 to $50,000; it sold for $55,000.

== Bibliography ==
- Abdelghany, Rehab Hosny (2013). "The (Handi)Craft of Fiction: Raranga and Whatu in "the bone people"". Journal of New Zealand Literature. 31 (2): 183–207. ISSN 0112-1227. JSTOR 23724112.
- Armstrong, Philip (2001). "Good-Eating: Ethics and Biculturalism in Reading the bone people". ARIEL. 32 (2): 37–96.
- Dale, Judith (1985). "the bone people: (Not) Having It Both Ways". Landfall. 39 (4): 413–427.
- Dann, Christine (1985). "Chapter 8: Creativity". Up From Under: Women and Liberation in New Zealand 1970–1985. Bridget Williams Books Limited. ISBN 978-1-9273-2727-2.
- Fee, Margery (1989). "Why C.K. Stead didn't like Keri Hulme's the bone people: Who can write as Other?". Australian and New Zealand Studies in Canada: 11–32. doi:10.14288/1.0074535.
- Fox, Stephen D. (2003). "Keri Hulme's The Bone People: The problem of beneficial child abuse". Journal of Evolutionary Psychology. 24: 40–55.
- Hulme, Keri (1984). the bone people (2001 ed.). London: Picador. ISBN 978-0-330-48541-8.
- Knudsen, Eva Rusk (2004). "4: The Void as Creative Metaphor". The Circle & the Spiral: A Study of Australian Aboriginal and New Zealand Māori Literature. Rodopi. ISBN 9789042010482.
- Melhop, Val (1999). "The Making of Ho(l)mes: A Symbolic Reading of the bone people". Journal of New Zealand Literature (17): 99–109. ISSN 0112-1227. JSTOR 20112311.
- Stead, C. K. (October 1985). "Keri Hulme's "The Bone People" and the Pegasus Award for Maori Literature". ARIEL. 16 (4): 103–104.
