= Irihapeti Ramsden =

New Zealand nurse and educator

Irihapeti Ramsden ONZM
- Born: Irihapeti Merenia Ramsden; 24 February 1946; Wellington, New Zealand
- Died: 5 April 2003 (aged 57); Wellington, New Zealand
- Occupation: Nurse
- Relatives: Eric Ramsden (father)

Academic background
- Education: Victoria University of Wellington
- Thesis: Cultural Safety and Nursing Education in Aotearoa and Te Waipounamu (2002)

Irihapeti Merenia Ramsden ONZM (24 February 1946 – 5 April 2003) was a New Zealand Māori nurse, anthropologist, and writer who worked to improve health outcomes for Māori people.

== Biography ==
Irihapeti Ramsden was the daughter of writer and historian Eric Ramsden and Merenia Manawatu, and was of Ngāi Tahu and Rangitāne iwi. She was born and raised in Wellington and trained as a nurse at Wellington Technical College. In 1963, she began working at Wellington Hospital.

In 1979, Ramsden enrolled at Victoria University of Wellington and studied for a degree in anthropology. In the 1980s, Ramsden developed Kawa Whakaruruhau or Cultural Safety in Nursing Education, an approach to health care which was both original and controversial. The approach required people and organisations in the health sector to consider Māori and other cultural identities that a patient brings with them as they access health services. These cultures include the culture of poverty, gender, sexual orientation or social class. Many of Ramsden’s recommendations were later legislated into nursing and midwifery education and adopted by other professions and movements in New Zealand and internationally; in 1992, cultural safety was officially incorporated into nursing training in New Zealand.

In 1984, Ramsden was one of the women who formed the Spiral Collective to publish Keri Hulme's novel, The Bone People, when mainstream publishers had rejected it. The book went on to win the 1984 Booker Prize.

In 2002, Ramsden completed her PhD at Victoria University of Wellington; her thesis was titled Cultural Safety and Nursing Education in Aotearoa and Te Waipounamu.

Ramsden died on 5 April 2003 at her Wellington home after a long illness with cancer. She was 57 years old. Tariana Turia, then Associate Maori Affairs Minister, and historian Michael King both issued statements of remembrance on her death. Ramsden had been invested as an Officer of the New Zealand Order of Merit two weeks before she died, the honour having been announced in the 2003 New Year Honours.
