= Eric Ramsden =

New Zealand journalist, writer, and art critic

George Eric Oakes Ramsden (1898–1962) was a New Zealand journalist, writer and art critic. He was born in Martinborough, Wairarapa, New Zealand on 1 August 1898 and died at Wellington on 21 May 1962.

== Background and family ==
Ramsden was the oldest child of English born Martinborough storekeeper and farmer Henry Oakes Ramsden and Sophia Jane Harris. He attended Martinborough primary school, but suffered from asthma and tuberculosis which made his attendance erratic. He also managed to get mentioned in the local paper when a lemonade bottle he was opening broke causing a cut to his eye. His father died on 21 July 1920.

He first married Evelyn Francis Graham in Sydney on 1 June 1926 and they had one child, a son. They divorced in 1948. On 18 May 1948 he married Henrietta Merenia Meteherangi Manawatu in 1948. Manawatu was of Ngāi Tahu and Rangitāne descent. They had two daughters and a son; one of the daughters was Irihapeti Ramsden, a leader in the field of Maori health. Their eldest daughter was adopted by Te Puea Herangi until her death in 1952. They divorced in June 1953.

He died at Wellington on 21 May 1962.

== Career ==
As a teenager Ramsden worked for the Bank of New South Wales at Wanganui and later as a shepherd on a farm near Castlepoint. He became a journalist for the Wairarapa Times-Age in 1919 when he was 20 years old. He moved to Auckland to work for the Auckland Star and then to Wellington where he worked for The New Zealand Times. In June 1924 he was employed by W H Morton Cameron of the Globe Encyclopedia Company of Chicago. By the mid-1920s he had moved to Sydney where he worked for the Sydney Morning Herald. By 1925 he was working for the Newcastle, New South Wales Sun newspaper. During 1926 he was writing in the Auckland Star and his articles, particularly of early New Zealand European history, were published by the paper from time to time up to 1935. Ramsden then moved back to Sydney in 1929 becoming the illustrations editor and special writer for the Sydney Morning Herald. In 1934 Ramsden switched to the Sydney-based Associated Newspapers Limited. Due to ill health Ramsden moved to Christchurch to work for the Press in 1942 where his journalistic focus was on history and Maori affairs. Moving back to Wellington in 1945, Ramsden joined the Evening Post becoming its diplomatic correspondent and art critic. He also wrote occasional article on topics of personal interest.

== Involvement with Maori ==
Ramsden had an early interest in Maori. In 1924 he published an article on the early Maori newspaper Te Karere o Nui Tireni.

In August 1927 the Sun sent Ramsden to Turangawaewae marae at Ngāruawāhia to interview Te Puea Herangi, a Tainui Princess. As a result of the meeting Ramsden became interested and involved in Maori and Maori-Pakeha relations. He published a feature article in the Sun on the Princess and her Model Village. When the Governor-General Sir Charles Fergusson visited Turangawaewae in April 1928 Ramsden covered the event for the newspaper. After these events Ramsden remained in contact with Herangi, visiting her and her family at Tahuna in January 1932. On this visit he met the native minister Sir Āpirana Ngata with whom he corresponded for many years.

During the 1950s Ramsden's Wellington home was used as a base by numerous Maori leaders for accommodation and meetings when they were in the capital on business with the Government. His children were encouraged to keep close contact with their Maori relatives. His involvement with Maori gained him recognition as a leading commentator on Maori Affairs. From 1949 he was consulted on Maori issues by the Prime Minister, Sidney Holland, and the minister of Maori Affairs, Ernest Corbett. He was recognised by Maori on marae and at major hui.

== Research and writing ==
After joining Associated Newspapers Ramsden took an interest in anthropology. He attended lectures on the subject at the University of Sydney and founded the Pacific Islands Club (now known as the Polynesian Society). He was the club's first secretary. Later he became President of the Anthropological Society of New South Wales. In 1935 he travelled with Charles Nordhoff to Tahiti and French Polynesia undertaking research. In January while in Hawaii he met up with Te Rangi Hīroa (Sir Peter Buck), who at that time was a professor of Yale University and the then leading expert on Polynesian culture.

After this journey Ramsden published his first book, Marsden and the missions in 1936 followed by James Busby: the prophet of Australian viticultureii in 1940. He was also a member of PEN during this time and continued to be after his return to New Zealand. Once back in New Zealand Ramsden wrote Busby of Waitangi in 1942, Strange stories from the South Seas in 1944, Sir Āpirana Ngata and Maori culture in 1948, and Rangiatea: the story of the Otaki church, its first pastor and its people in 1951. He did write one more book in 1954 as a memorial to Buck, A memoir -- Te Rangihiroa : memorial to Sir Peter Buck. He had intended to write two further books, biographies of Te Puea and Sir Peter Buck, but these were never completed.

His collected papers are stored at Archives New Zealand. These, including correspondence between Buck and Ngata, are considered one of the important repositories of twentieth century Maori history.
