= O'Neill Bay =

Bay in New Zealand

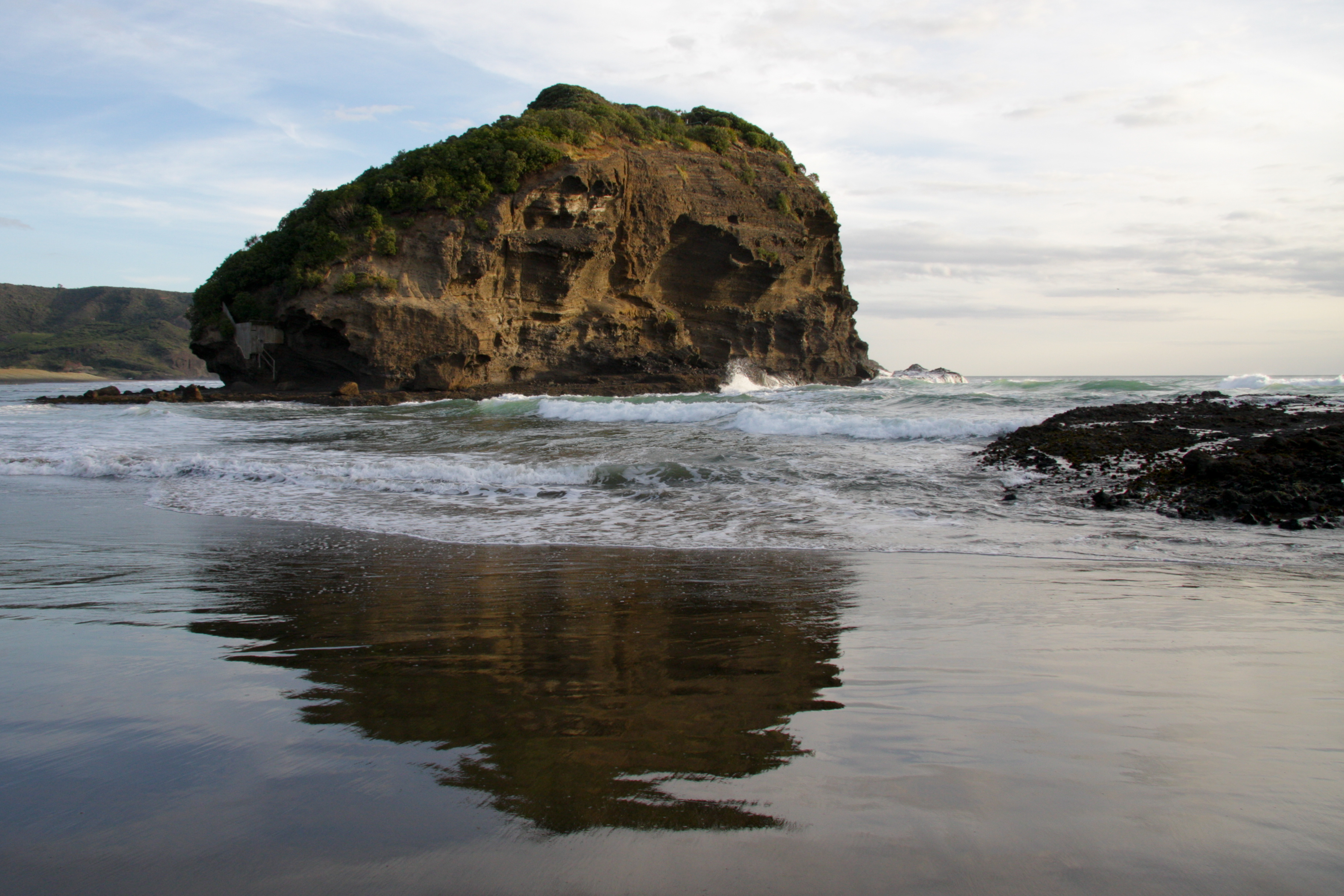
- Kauwahaia Island at O'Neill Bay

- Location within the Auckland Region
- Location: Auckland Region, New Zealand
- Coordinates: 36.884°S 174.435°E
- Ocean/sea sources: Tasman Sea
- Islands: Kauwahaia Island

O'Neill Bay is a bay on the Auckland Region of New Zealand's North Island. It is located north of Te Henga / Bethells Beach.

== Description ==
O'Neill Bay is directly north of Te Henga / Bethells Beach, between Erangi Point to the south and Raetahinga Point to the north. An island is found to the south of the bay, named Kauwahaia Island. The Te Henga Walkway follows the ridge around the bay.

== Geology ==
O'Neill Bay and the cliffs around Raetahinga Point are the remnants of a Miocene era volcanic crater complex. The 100 metre thick sequence is composed of at least 11 thin andesite flows, interspersed with breccia, scoria and lapilli tuffs.

== History ==
The bay is within the traditional rohe of the Te Kawerau ā Maki iwi. The bay's name, Te Awakauwahaia, or Kauwahia for short, refers to the ancestress Erangi. Erangi was a woman of high birth who lived at Te Ihumoana at Te Henga / Bethells Beach in approximately the 14th century. After falling in love with a man at Puketōtara to the north of Te Henga, Erangi decided to evade the guarded walking paths to the hill, by swimming to O'Neill Bay, and eventually to Te Waharoa Point, with her child on her back. Many of the traditional place names north of Te Henga commemorate her feat of endurance.

The bay is mentioned in a legend of Tikinui, of the Te Kawerau ā Maki people. The daughter of a chief from Piha, who fell in love with a warrior from Muriwai despite being betrothed to another chief, would come to the beach to meet her lover in secret. In order to hide their meetings, the warrior would bury himself in the sand, breathing through a reed, while the daughter sat on top of him, hiding him with her cloak. Eventually her father was suspicious of her actions, and discovered her lover by piercing the sand underneath her cloak with his spear. The Tikinui rock column at the north of the beach was where he was killed.

During the early colonial era of Auckland, the bay was named O'Neill Bay, after one of the earliest settlers in the area.
