= Carole Shepheard =

New Zealand artist

Carole Shepheard ONZM
- Born: Carole Marie Shepheard; 6 November 1945 (age 81); Taumarunui, New Zealand
- Education: Elam School of Fine Arts, PhD
- Known for: Printmaking
- Movement: Feminism
- Awards: Officer of the New Zealand Order of Merit (ONZM)

Carole Marie Shepheard ONZM (born 6 November 1945) is a New Zealand artist. She specialises in printmaking and her work is held in national and international collections including the Museum of New Zealand Te Papa Tongarewa and the Auckland Art Gallery Toi o Tāmaki.

== Education ==
Shepheard studied at the University of Auckland Elam School of Fine Art in 1964–1967 (Honours in Stage Design) and 1998–2004, receiving a Doctorate of Fine Arts in 2004.

== Career ==
A self-described feminist artist, Shepheard's work revolves around the re-interpretation of historical, domestic, and cultural objects. Through her prints she used symbols and images of the body in a consciously feminist way. Her use of materials draws on her feminist reflections on the role of women, specifically in the home. In her early years as an artist she concentrated on small-scale, often modular pieces, that utilised women's traditional arts, including stitching, quilting, batik, and weaving. From the mid–1970s she expanded to drawings, collages, etchings, and prints.

She was an early member of the Feminist Art Networkers. Formed in 1982, the network was made up of Auckland women artists and art historians and included Juliet Batten, Elizabeth Eastmond, Alexa Johnston, Claudia Pond Eyley, Priscilla Pitts, and Cheryll Sotheran.

Shepheard taught at the Elam School of Fine Arts for sixteen years, holding teaching, administrative and managerial positions. While at the school she established a Women in Leadership Programme, curated participation in international biennales and exhibitions, supported an artist in residence programme, and founded the Association of Women Artists and in 1991, the Artists Alliance. Shepheard retired from Elam in 2007.

In 1993, with Anne Gambrill, and support from the Auckland Zonta International Club, she organised the Zonta New Zealand Women's Print exhibition. The exhibited toured galleries throughout New Zealand to celebrate the centenary of women's suffrage in New Zealand.

In the 2002 New Year Honours, Shepheard was appointed an Officer of the New Zealand Order of Merit, for services to the arts.

Shepheard is the president of the Waikato Society of Arts and a director of the Te Puti Art Studio, where she also works as an artist. She established the Te Puti Art Studio in 2009 to teach and support local artists.

=== Exhibitions ===
At the Auckland Art Gallery Toi o Tāmaki she exhibited a solo show in 1991, Carole Shepheard: Essence and Shadow, and in 1993 was part of Unruly Practices, a series of solo projects by feminist artists living in Auckland, including works by Claudia Pond Eyley, Mary McIntyre, Christine Hellyar, Sylvia Siddell.

Shepheard created the Museum of Cultural Anxiety (MOCA) in an Auckland warehouse space. The project operated between 2002–2006 and provided the basis for her doctoral study. She showcased the outcome of her doctoral work in 2002 with her exhibition Off Site at the Te Tuhi gallery in Pakuranga, Auckland. A huge mixed-media exhibition, it was opened by then Prime Minister Helen Clark.
