= Janet Charman =

New Zealand poet

- Born: 1954 (age 71–72)
- Education: Auckland University (MA)
- Writing career
- Language: English
- Genre: Poetry
- Notable awards: Montana Award for Poetry

Janet Charman (born 1954) is a poet from New Zealand.

== Background ==
Born in 1954, Charman grew up in the Hutt Valley and Taranaki.

Charman initially trained as a nurse and worked in social welfare. After receiving an MA in English from the University of Auckland she worked as a tutor in the university's English department. In 1997 was named as a writer in residence and received a Literary Fellowship. She also received a fellowship from the Hong Kong Baptist University. Charman continues to teach writing classes and is based in Auckland.

== Works ==
Charman's poems are often set in the suburbs of New Zealand and draw on issues that relate specifically to women, including topics such as sexuality, victimisation, and motherhood. She is known for her stylistic choices such as using limited punctuation and capitalisation, including lowercase for the pronoun 'I'.

Collections of poetry published by Charman include:

- Drawing Together (1985, Spiral), with Marina Bachmann and Sue Fitchett
- 2 deaths in 1 night (1987, New Women's Press)
- red letter (1992, Auckland University Press)
- end of the dry (1995, Auckland University Press)
- Rapunzel Rapunzel (1999, Auckland University Press)
- Snowing Down South (2002, Auckland University Press)
- Cold Snack (Auckland University Press, 2007)
- The Pistils (Otago University Press, 2022)

She has also been publishing in several anthologies including The New Poets: initiatives in New Zealand poetry (1987, edited by Murray Edmond and Mary Paul) and Yellow Pencils: Contemporary Poetry by New Zealand Women (1988, edited by Lydia Wevers).

Poems by Charman have appeared in the Best New Zealand Poems series, including in 2005 and 2007.

== Awards ==
In 2008, her collection of poems, Cold Snack was awarded the Poetry Award at the Montana New Zealand Book Awards.
