= Women's Gallery =

New Zealand art gallery collective

The Women's Gallery was a collectively established and run art gallery in Wellington, New Zealand, showing only the work of women, that ran for four years between 1980 and 1984.

== History ==
In 1977, artist Joanna Paul developed a project called "A Season's Diaries" in Wellington, which connected a number of female artists including Heather McPherson, Allie Eagle, Gladys Gurney (also known as Saj Gurney), Anna Keir, Bridie Lonie and Marian Evans. It was this project that led Marian Evans, Anna Keir and Bridie Lonie to create the Women's Gallery.

The gallery first opened in January 1980 at 26 Harris Street. It was a functional gallery space whose goal was to "bring together women who were working in isolation and wanted a women's context". It was run on a collective and usually voluntary basis, with many women contributing. The first exhibition, a group show, opened on 21 January 1980. The exhibition featured the work of Paul, Eagle, McPherson, Lonie, Juliet Batten, Claudia Eyley, Keri Hulme, Nancy Petersen, Helen Rockel, Carole Stewart and Tiffany Thornley. Its aim was to promote images of women by women and to support and promote women in the arts.

Exhibitions were often arranged thematically, engaging in issues that impacted women's lives (for example, Women and Violence or Mothers). The gallery had a focus on education and promoting women, rather than on selling art. The show Mothers was particularly successful, and Allan Highet (then Minister of Internal Affairs) purchased 500 copies of the catalogue for distribution in schools and universities. According to curator and art historian Anne Kirker:

Mothers was undoubtedly the most significant project of this collectively-run enterprise. Accompanied by a comprehensive catalogue, the exhibition toured throughout New Zealand from 1981 and afterwards went to Sydney for the Women and Arts Festival (October 1982). In this country it was shown in community centres as well as galleries, in an effort to reach a wider audience. Many women who saw this show were deeply moved to recognise their own experience in art for perhaps the first time.

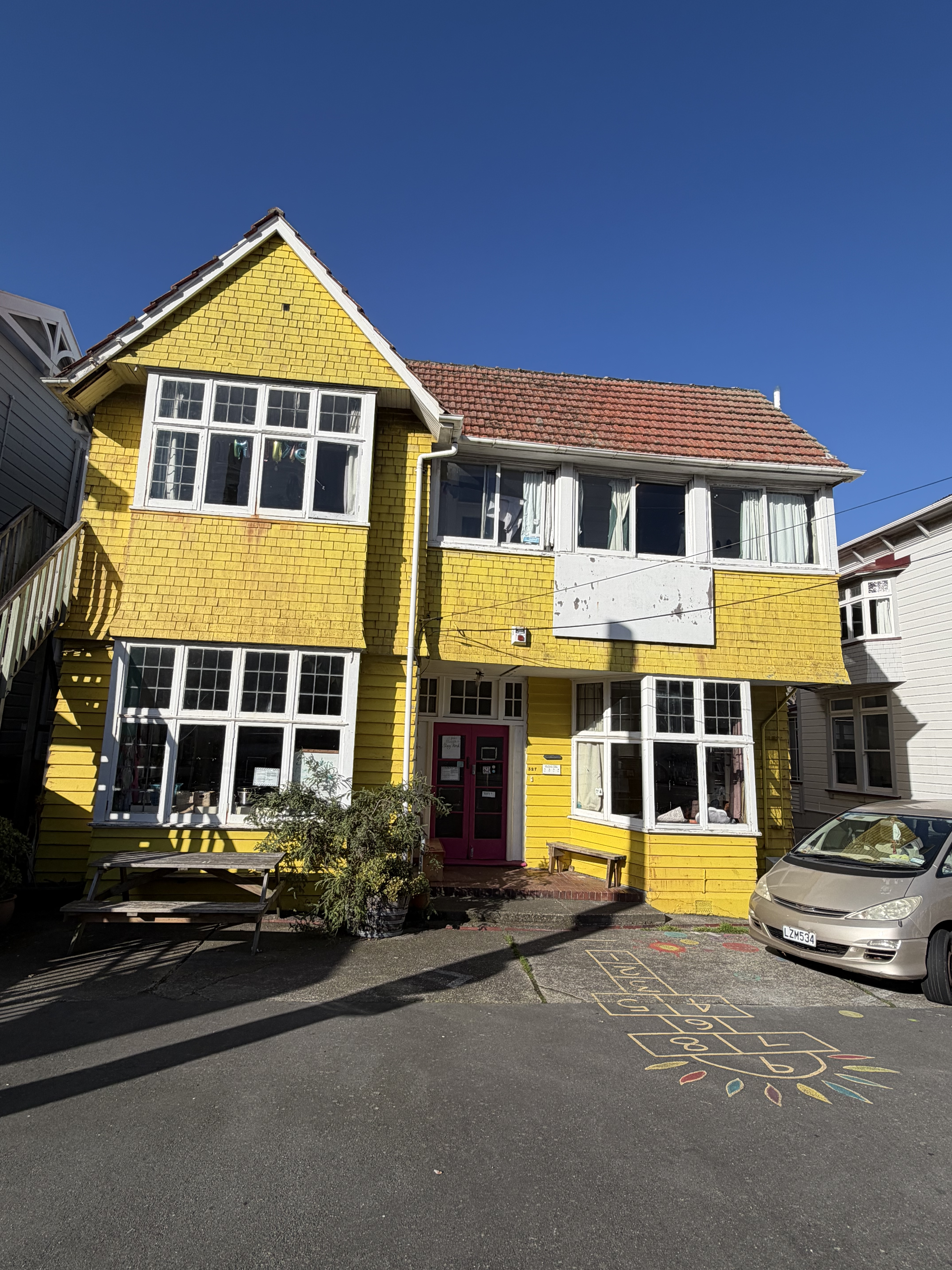
323 Willis Street (2026)

The gallery struggled financially from its inception, and in early 1981 had to cancel a planned national tour of five poets/musicians due to an inability to obtain funding. In around 1981 or 1982 the gallery moved into new premises at 323 Willis Street, where it remained until its closure in 1984. The decision to close was made at the annual meeting in January of that year, largely due to ongoing financial difficulties. In 1988, A Woman's Picture Book: 25 Women Artists of Aotearoa (New Zealand) was published by Spiral and the Government Printing Office. It was compiled and edited by Evans, Lonie and Tilly Lloyd. Most of the women artists featured in the book had exhibited pieces in the Women's Gallery and the book includes information about the gallery.

The gallery was associated with the publishers Kidsaurus 2 and Spiral. The Women's Gallery Incorporated charity continued to operate as a parent organisation and provide financial support for Spiral projects until 2005.

== Bibliography ==
- Baker, Kirsty (2016). Inhabiting the threshold: the Women's Gallery as liminal space in New Zealand's feminist art history (PDF) (MA). Victoria University of Wellington.
- Collard, Judith (May 2006). "Spiral Women: Locating Lesbian Activism in New Zealand Feminist Art, 1975–1992". Journal of the History of Sexuality. 15 (2). University of Texas Press: 292–320. doi:10.1353/sex.2007.0002. JSTOR 4629655. PMID 19235282. S2CID 35342439.
- Dann, Christine (1985). "Chapter 8: Creativity". Up From Under: Women and Liberation in New Zealand 1970–1985. Bridget Williams Books Limited. ISBN 978-1-9273-2727-2.
