= Cheryll Sotheran =

New Zealand curator

Dame Cheryll Sotheran DNZM
- Born: Cheryll Beatrice Sotheran; 11 October 1945; Stratford, New Zealand
- Died: 30 December 2017 (aged 72); Auckland, New Zealand
- Occupation: Museum professional

Dame Cheryll Beatrice Sotheran DNZM (11 October 1945 – 30 December 2017) was a New Zealand museum professional. She was the founding chief executive of the Museum of New Zealand Te Papa Tongarewa and was credited with the successful completion of the museum, considered the largest international museum project of the 1990s.

== Early life and education ==
Sotheran was born on 11 October 1945 into a large Roman Catholic family in Stratford, a farming town in New Zealand's Taranaki province. She was educated at St Mary's College in Auckland and graduated from secondary teachers' college in 1968. She went on to complete a master's degree in English at the University of Auckland in 1969, then undertook further study in the Art History department at that university.

== Career ==
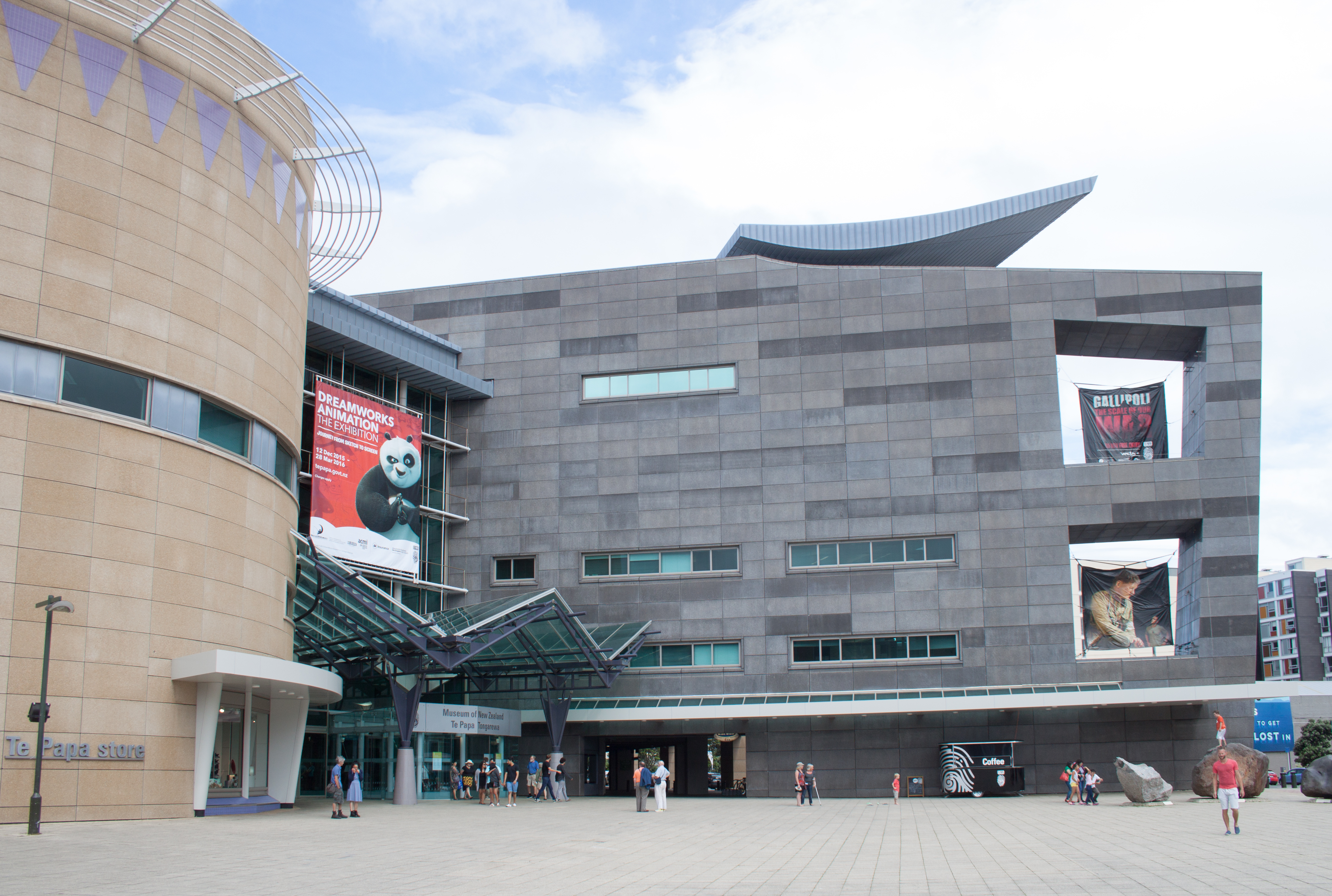
Exterior view of Te Papa Tongarewa in 2016

Sotheran lectured in Art History at Auckland University and while in the city, she was also a founding member of the Feminist Art Network, working with artists and curators who included Juliet Batten, Elizabeth Eastmond, Alexa Johnston, Claudia Pond Eyley, Priscilla Pitts and Carole Shephea~~rd~~~~.~~ As Sotheran put it, “We knew as women we had a choice of working against the flow or simply going with the flow”. Throughout the 1980s, Sotheran was also a regular writer and critic for the Auckland Star and Art New Zealand. In 1983 she was invited to write the lead article for Art New Zealand’s special issue on women artists in which she considered whether their work would have to first take a separatist position before becoming integrated with mainstream art. Sotheran pulled no punches critiquing male critics and their ‘trivializing’ of women’s art and outlined how women artist were pushing back even if [Lucy Lippard’s] dream of equality seemed "no closer, and the need to be distinctive in order to be effective still prevails." Writer Peter Ireland wrote of Sotheran’s art criticism that she had the ‘ability to sense a new direction and formulate her hunches crisply…. always at her best when she analysed the sometimes difficult work of an artist she esteemed.’ During this time Sotheran also became increasingly interested in art museums and exhibitions and in 1986 was appointed as the fifth Director of the Govett-Brewster Art Gallery in New Plymouth. In 1985, with Luit Bieringa, director of the National Art Gallery, she curated New Zealand’s first participation in the Art Gallery of New South Wales regular exhibition Perspecta 85 and the following year she curated Not a Dog Show: Tom Kreisler for the Govett-Brewster. Increasingly involved in arts management, many of the major exhibitions she presented at the Govett-Brewster were curated by independent curators, most notably Robert Leonard’s Pākehā Mythology (1986) and Wystan Curnow’s Putting the Land on the Map: Art and Cartography in New Zealand Art Since 1840 (1989). Alongside her administrative work Sotheran also formed close relationships with local Iwi forming ideas of community that would be critical to her thinking in the future. In 1989, she was appointed director of the Dunedin Public Art Gallery. Sotheran brought with her from the Govett-Brewster a sense of the contemporary that shaped both the exhibition programme and purchasing for the collection. She was also responsible for setting up the relocation of the gallery from Logan Park to a central city site in the Octagon. Dunedin art historian and lecturer Peter Stupples recalls Sotheran’s arrival as “life-changing for the gallery.’

== Te Papa Tongarewa ==
In 1992 Sotheran was appointed founding chief executive of the nascent Museum of New Zealand Te Papa Tongarewa. The new institution was created from the merger of New Zealand's National Museum and National Art Gallery in a new building on the Wellington waterfront. From the beginning of her tenure Sotheran saw Te Papa as a ‘forum’ a concept that had deep roots in both Pākehā and Māori traditions. She saw it as creating a place where people could be "active participants in the formation of their own identity.” To activate this kind of public collaboration with the museum, Sotheran looked to private sector and entertainment focussed companies such as McDonalds and Disneyland. “They have a lot to teach us" Sotheran once commented. She considered that exhibition formats could play a pivotal part in this approach and that they should be provocative, dramatic and attractive rather than play a set educational role. As Sotheran put it, “If it’s boring, we don’t want it.”

The construction of Te Papa was the biggest international museum project of the 1990s and included moving a hotel on wheels to enable the museum to be built on its waterfront site. Under Sotheran's direction the opening of Te Papa in February 1998 was completed on time and on budget. Working with Cliff Whiting Sotheran as CEO was able to progress her vision of a bi-cultural model for Te Papa by positioning herself as the ‘formal administrator’ and Cliff Whiting as kaihautū ‘the CEO before Māori and iwi’. A documentary by Anna Cottrell and Gaylene Preston, Getting to Our Place, records the process of developing the museum on this new museological principle.

Sotheran weathered several controversies during her tenure at Te Papa, including ongoing criticism of the display of the national art collection and significant public protest when Tania Kovats' Virgin in a Condom was exhibited at the museum in an exhibition of work by the Young British Artists in 1998. As historian Mark Stocker has noted, this reaction was in excess of anything seen in New Zealand museums before. He considered that by calling Te Papa ‘Our Place’ the museum had opened itself up to angry criticism of the way the Catholic faith was being treated by the institution. The result was that 'senior management was threatened with violence and received abusive and threatening phone calls; a police-monitored security system was installed in Sotheran's residence.’

Sotheran resigned from Te Papa for health reasons in 2002 and went on to become sector director of creative industries at New Zealand Trade and Enterprise. Here she was responsible for the strategic development of the creative industries across all sectors in the New Zealand economy. She brought to the job what she described as a “highly collaborative approach..." Never one to back off an unpopular idea she told Creative New Zealand that from her point-of-view there were no tried and true measurements for creative success and that NZT&E, rather than using difficult to define creative judgements and measurements, would test results on their economic outcomes.

== Honours and awards ==
1989

- Fulbright Scholarship to study developments in art administration.

1990

- New Zealand 1990 Commemoration Medal

1993

- New Zealand Suffrage Centennial Medal

1998

- The North and South New Zealander of the Year Award 1999.

1999

- Awarded the Dame Companion of the New Zealand Order of Merit, for services to museum administration in the New Year Honours.
- Distinguished alumni award from the University of Auckland.

2014

- Companion of the Auckland War Memorial Museum.

In 2018 the Dame Cheryll Sotheran Memorial Scholarship was founded for - a contribution to research and training for the next generation of museum professionals.

== Death ==
In 2013, Sotheran suffered a stroke. She battled health issues until her death in Auckland on 30 December 2017, from undisclosed causes, aged 72.
