= Helen Rockel =

New Zealand artist

- Born: Helen Margaret Rockel; 1949 (age 76–77); Whanganui, New Zealand
- Education: Ilam School of Fine Arts
- Known for: Painting

Helen Margaret Rockel (born 1949) is a New Zealand artist.

== Background ==
Rockel was born in 1949 in Whanganui, New Zealand. She attended the Ilam School of Fine Arts between 1968 and 1971, receiving an Honours in painting.

== Career ==
Known as a painter, her work is notable for its vivid realism and feminist references. Many of Rockel's paintings are portraits, often influenced by her travels through Turkey, Iraq, Iran, Pakistan, Nepal and India.

Rockel has exhibited with the Canterbury Society of Arts and The Group in 1973 and 1975. In 1975 she was part of the exhibition Six Women Artists, organised by Allie Eagle at the Robert McDougall Art Gallery, exhibiting with Stephanie Sheehan, Joanna Harris, Rhondda Bosworth, Joanne Hardy, and Jane Arbuckle.

Her works are held in collections at the Museum of New Zealand Te Papa Tongarewa and Christchurch Art Gallery Te Puna o Waiwhetu.
