= Anna Keir =

New Zealand artist

- Born: 1951 (age 74–75); Wellington, New Zealand
- Occupation: Artist

Anna Keir (born 1951) is a New Zealand artist. Her works are held in the collection of Auckland Art Gallery.

== Biography ==
Keir was born in Wellington in 1951, and attended Ilam School of Fine Arts.

Keir was one of the early members of the New Zealand Women’s Art Movement which originally evolved in Christchurch in the early 1970s. The main facilitators and organisers of the movement were Keir, Allie Eagle, Jane Zusters, Joanna Paul and Heather McPherson. Keir is credited as being the “organiser of the whole shebang”.

One of the key projects of the Women’s Art Movement was the establishment of the Women’s Gallery, a collectively established and run art gallery in Wellington, New Zealand, that ran for four years between 1980 and 1984. Keir was one of the key figures behind this project, credited with designing the gallery’s logo and illustrated posters.

After leaving the Gallery, Keir went to work for the Historic Places Trust in Wellington.

== Exhibitions ==
- This Joyous, Chaotic Place: He Waiata Tangi-ā-Tahu, Christchurch Art Gallery, 2018. This exhibition celebrated the life and work of poet, lesbian feminist and activist Heather McPherson.
- Mothers, Women’s Gallery, Wellington, 1981. Keir presented six drawings and a dolls’ house installation, and also coordinated the exhibition alongside Marian Evans. The show travelled to Sydney at the end of 1982 for the Women and Arts Festival.
- Three Women Artists: Allie Eagle/Jane Zusters/Anna Keir, 1978.
- A Seasons Diaries, Victoria University of Wellington, 1978.
