= Allie Eagle =

New Zealand artist (1949–2022)

- Born: January 9, 1949
- Died: May 25, 2022 (aged 73); Auckland, New Zealand
- Known for: feminist art

Allie Eagle (9 January 1949 – 25 May 2022) was a New Zealand artist whose work in the 1970s was key to the development of feminist art practice in New Zealand. Eagle was the subject of the 2004 documentary Allie Eagle and Me (2004), and identified as "a lesbian separatist and radical feminist." Eagle was actively involved in women's art collectives, notably Spiral.

== Early life and education ==
Eagle was born in Lower Hutt. Her birth name was Alison Mitchell but she took the name Eagle in the 1970s, linked to a series of watercolours titled I the eagle become.

Eagle completed a Diploma of Fine Arts at Ilam School of Art, University of Canterbury in 1968. She studied at Auckland Training College for a year and taught at Upper Hutt College before returning to Christchurch and becoming Exhibitions Officer at the Robert McDougall Art Gallery in 1974 (a job she later had to leave after falling from a ladder and cracking her pelvis).

== Career and work ==
Eagle was integrally involved in the women's art movement that emerged in New Zealand in the 1970s, initially most strongly expressed in Christchurch. In June 1975 Eagle organised Six Women Artists at the Robert McDougall Art Gallery, the first public exhibition in New Zealand focused solely "on the premise of declaring female identity". The exhibition included the work of Helen Rockel, Stephanie Sheehan, Joanna Margaret Paul and others. In her catalogue essay Eagle cited feminist art historians, artists and writers such as Judy Chicago and Linda Nochlin, arguing that women have been prevented from being seen as serious artists because of social misconceptions about their abilities and role in society.

In 1977 Eagle was involved as a facilitator in a collaborative project at the Canterbury Society of Arts, the Women's Art Environment. Designed to be more than a gallery displaying art, the intent was to create a space where women could meet and share their experiences. Eagle was also involved with the Women's Gallery in Wellington, established in 1980, showing in their opening exhibition and in the 1981 touring exhibition Mothers.

Art historian Anne Kirker wrote in 1986 that Eagle's "commitment as a facilitator in these early years was matched by an uncompromising approach as an artist". A 1978 exhibition at the Canterbury Society of Arts created some controversy and Eagle received hate mail. The exhibition was made up of many diverse parts, but a small number relating to the issue of abortion rights became influential in New Zealand feminist art history. This woman died I care is a large watercolour now in the collection of Auckland Art Gallery, and was based on a banned photograph of a woman who died from an illegal abortion (Eagle had earlier used the photograph on a placard used in a Christchurch abortion rights rally). The work was accompanied by stethoscope and the printed instructions "To view this woman's death place stethoscope on and listen to your own heartbeat". In the piece Empathy for a Rape Trial Victim men and boys were invited to lie on a stained mattress (implicitly taking the place of the victim), which was placed beneath a glass sheet on a metal frame; at crotch-level on the glass a metal cylinder evoking an erect penis was placed; a mixture of squashed eggs, spaghetti and jelly oozed out of its funnel.

In their introduction to Alter / Image, a 1993 exhibition reviewing two decades of feminist art-making in New Zealand, Tina Barton and Deborah Lawler-Dormer wrote of Eagle's works that "Their rawness is a direct appeal that is almost unparalleled in New Zealand art history". For Alter / Image Eagle recreated a work from the 1978 show titled Risk (a bowl full of red jelly embedded with razor blades) and showed the watercolours Oh yes, we will, we will (1978) and This woman died I care along with a recreation of the stethoscope and text work.

In 1978 Eagle moved to Te Henga, near Auckland, renting a house from another feminist artist, Juliet Batten. In 1980 she converted to Pentecostal Christianity. Since that time her work has been concerned with the land as subject and material. Eagle continued to practice as an artist in an atelier style from her studio in Te Henga. She died on 25 May 2022 at North Shore Hospital.

== Allie Eagle and Me ==
In 2004 the documentary Allie Eagle and Me was released. Directed by Briar March and with Eagle as an executive producer, the documentary looked at Eagle's place in the women's art movement of the 1970s, her journey from being a lesbian feminist to celibate Christianity, and her subsequent reconsideration of some of her positions in this period. In particular the artist stated she now has mixed views on her stance on abortion in the 1970s.
