= Keri Hulme =

New Zealand writer (1947–2021)

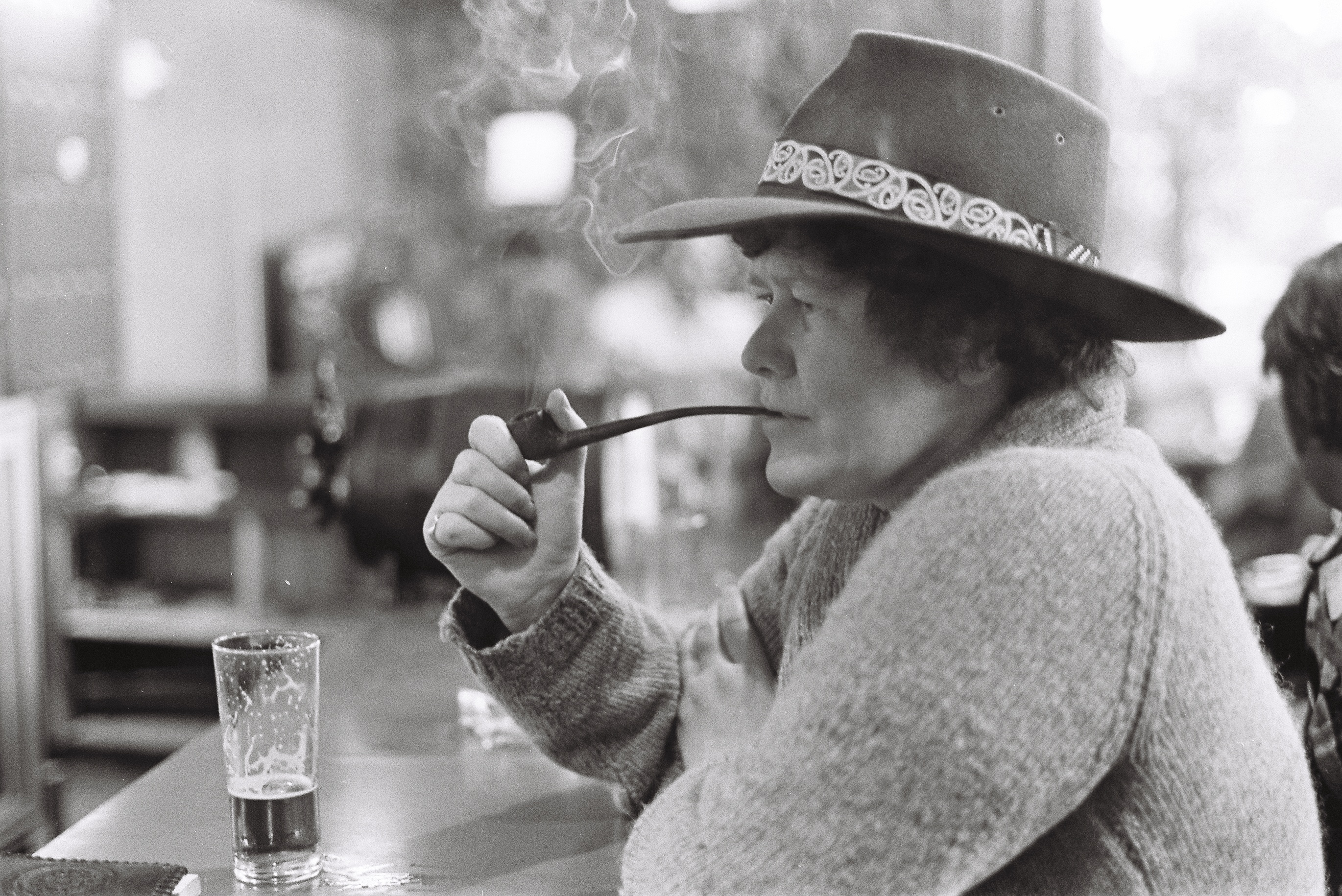
- Hulme, 1983
- Born: Kerry Ann Ruhi Hulme; 9 March 1947; Christchurch, New Zealand
- Died: 27 December 2021 (aged 74); Waimate, New Zealand
- Occupation: Author
- Writing career
- Pen name: Kai Tainui
- Notable work: the bone people (1984)

Keri Ann Ruhi Hulme (9 March 1947 – 27 December 2021) was a New Zealand novelist, poet and short-story writer. She also wrote under the pen name Kai Tainui. Her novel The Bone People won the Booker Prize in 1985; she was the first New Zealander to win the award, and also the first writer to win the prize for a debut novel. Hulme's writing explores themes of isolation, postcolonial and multicultural identity, and Māori, Celtic, and Norse mythology.

== Early life ==
Hulme was born on 9 March 1947 in Burwood Hospital, Christchurch, New Zealand. The daughter of John William Hulme, a carpenter, and Mary Ann Miller, a credit manager, she was the eldest of six children. Her father was a first-generation New Zealander whose parents were from Lancashire, England, and her mother came from Oamaru, of Orkney Scots and Māori descent (Kāi Tahu and Kāti Māmoe). "Our family comes from diverse people: Kāi Tahu, Kāti Māmoe (South Island Māori iwi); Orkney Islanders; Lancashire folk; Faroese and/or Norwegian migrants," Hulme stated.

Hulme grew up in Christchurch at 160 Leaver Terrace, New Brighton, where she attended North New Brighton Primary School and Aranui High School. She described herself as a "very definite and determined child who inherently hate[d] assumed authority". In 1958, when she was 11, her father died. Hulme remembered herself as being interested in writing from a young age. She rewrote Enid Blyton stories the way she thought they should have been written, wrote poetry from the age of 12, and composed short stories; her mother organised the side front porch into a study for her after her father's death. Some of her poems and short stories were published in Aranui High School's magazine. The family spent their holidays with her mother's family at Moeraki, on the Otago East Coast, and Hulme identified Moeraki as her turangawaewae-ngakau, "the standing-place of my heart".

After high school, Hulme worked as a tobacco picker in Motueka. She began studying for an honours law degree at the University of Canterbury in 1967, but left after four terms—feeling "estranged/out-of-place"—and returned to tobacco picking, although she continued to write.

== Career ==
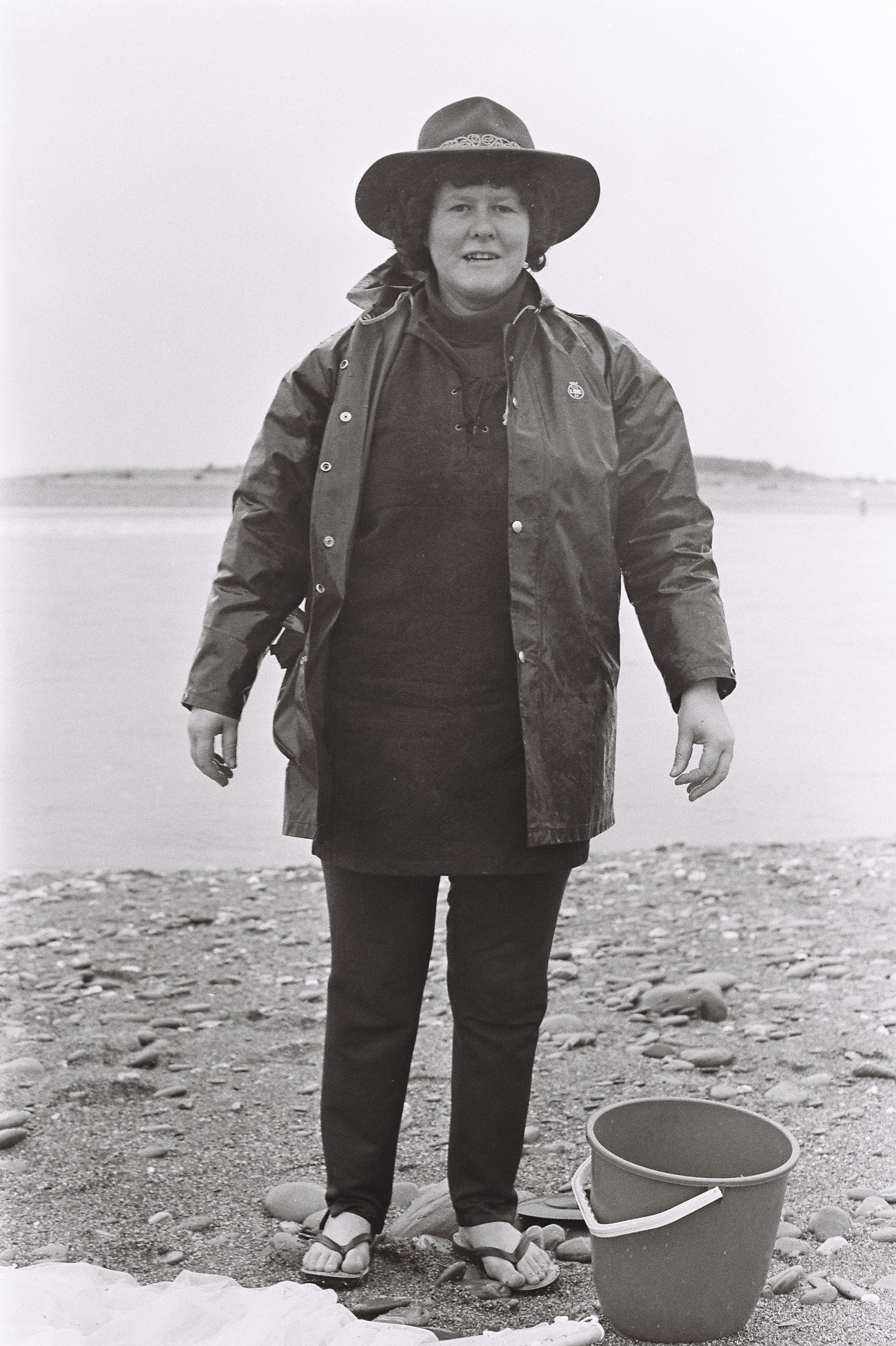
Hulme with a catch of whitebait in 1983

By 1972, Hulme had accumulated a large quantity of notes and drawings and decided to begin writing full-time, but, despite financial support from her family, she returned to work nine months later. She worked in a range of jobs, including in retail, as a fish-and-chips cook, a winder at a woollen mill, and as a mail deliverer in Greymouth, on the West Coast of the South Island. She was also a pharmacist's assistant at Grey Hospital, a proofreader and journalist at the Grey Evening Star, and an assistant television director on the shows Country Calendar, Dig This and Play School. She continued writing, and had her work published in journals and magazines; some appeared under the pseudonym Kai Tainui.

Hulme received Literary Fund grants in 1973, 1977, and 1979, and in 1979 she was a guest at the East-West Center in Hawaii as a visiting poet. Hulme held the 1977 Robert Burns Fellowship and became writer-in-residence at the University of Otago in 1978. During this time, she continued working on her novel, the bone people.

Hulme submitted the manuscript for the bone people to several publishers over a period of 12 years, until it was accepted for publication by the Spiral Collective, a feminist literary and arts collective in New Zealand. The book was published in February 1984 and won the 1984 New Zealand Book Award for Fiction and the Booker Prize in 1985. Hulme was the first New Zealander to win the Booker Prize and also the first writer to win the prize for their debut novel. The ceremony was broadcast on Channel 4. As Hulme was unable to attend, she asked three women from Spiral – Irihapeti Ramsden, Marian Evans and Miriama Evans – to accept the award on her behalf. Ramsden and Miriama Evans walked up to the podium wearing Māori korowai, arm in arm with Marian Evans in a tuxedo, and chanted a Māori karanga as they went.

In 1985, Hulme was writer-in-residence at the University of Canterbury and in 1990 she was awarded the 1990 Scholarship in Letters from the Queen Elizabeth Arts Council Literature Committee for two years. Also in 1990, she was awarded the New Zealand 1990 Commemoration Medal. In 1996 she became the patron of New Zealand Republic. Hulme also served on the Literary Fund Advisory Committee (1985–1989) and New Zealand's Indecent Publications Tribunal (1985–1990).

Around 1986 Hulme began working on a second novel, BAIT, about fishing and death. She also worked on a third novel, On the Shadow Side; these two works were referred to by Hulme as "twinned novels".

Common themes in Hulme's writing are identity and isolation. Inspiration for her characters and stories also often came to her in dreams; she first dreamt of a mute, long-haired boy when she was 18, and wrote a short story about him called Simon Peter’s Shell. The boy continued to appear in her dreams and eventually became the main character of the bone people.

== Personal life and death ==
In 1973, Hulme won a land ballot and became the owner of a plot in the remote coastal settlement of Ōkārito in south Westland, on the South Island of New Zealand. She built an octagonal house on the land and spent most of her adult life (almost 40 years) there. She vocally opposed plans to develop the settlement with additional housing or tourist facilities and believed it deserved special government protection. In late 2011, Hulme announced that she was leaving the area as local body rates (property taxes) meant she could no longer afford to live there. She identified as atheist, aromantic, and asexual.

Hulme's given name was recorded at birth as "Kerry", although her family used the spelling "Keri". She legally changed her name to "Keri" in 2001.

She died from dementia at a care home in Waimate on 27 December 2021, at the age of 74.

== Works ==
=== Novels ===
- The Bone People (Spiral Press, 1984)
- BAIT and On the Shadow Side (unfinished)

=== Poetry ===
- The silences between (Moeraki Conversations) (Auckland University Press, 1982)
- Lost Possessions (Victoria University Press, 1985)
- Strands (Auckland University Press, 1993)

=== Other works ===
- Te Kaihau: The Windeater (Victoria University Press, 1986), collection of short stories
- Te Whenua, Te Iwi/The Land and The People co-edited with Jock Philips (Allen & Unwin/Port Nicholson Press, 1987), includes Hulme's autobiographical piece "Okatiro and Moeraki"
- Homeplaces: Three Coasts of the South Island of New Zealand (Hodder & Stoughton, 1989), autobiography
- Hokitika Handmade (Hokitika Craft Gallery Co-operative, 1999), description and history of the co-operative and its members
- Ahua – the story of Moki (2000), libretto of an opera based on the story of the Ngāi Tahu ancestor Moki, commissioned by the Christchurch City Choir
- Stonefish (Huia Publishers, 2004), collection of short stories and poems

=== Adaptation into film ===
In 1983, Hulme's short story "Hooks and Feelers" was made into a short film of the same name starring Bridgette Allen. In 1995, Christine Parker wrote and directed, and Caterina de Nave produced, an adaptation of Hulme's 1991 short story "Hinekaro Goes On a Picnic and Blows Up Another Obelisk".

== Awards ==
Year	Award	Work	Notes
1975	Katherine Mansfield Memorial Award	Hooks and Feelers	
1977	Māori Trust Fund Prize		
1984	New Zealand Book of the Year (Fiction)	the bone people	
1984	Mobil Pegasus Award for Māori Literature	the bone people	
1985	Booker Prize	the bone people	
1987	Chianti Ruffino-Antico Fattore Prize	the bone people	

== See also ==
- New Zealand literature
