= Alter / Image =

Art exhibition in New Zealand

Alter / Image: Feminism and Representation in New Zealand Art 1973-1993 was an exhibition curated by Tina Barton and Deborah Lawler-Dormer to mark the centennial of women's suffrage in New Zealand. The exhibition showed at City Gallery Wellington from 1 August to 21 November 1993 and Auckland City Art Gallery from 17 December 1993 to 20 February 1994.

== Exhibition ==
A number of exhibitions focused on women artists in New Zealand were staged in 1993, including Alter / Image, Mediatrix : new works by seven women artists at Artspace in Auckland (curated by Priscilla Pitts and featuring Mary-Louise Browne, Denise Kum, Julia Morison, Marie Shannon, Deborah Smith, Aromea Tahiwi and Barbara Tuck); Unruly Practices (a series of solo projects by feminist artists living in Auckland - Carole Shepheard, Claudia Pond Eyley, Mary McIntyre, Christine Hellyar and Sylvia Siddell) at Auckland Art Gallery, White Camellias : a century of women's artmaking in Canterbury and Women on women : art in Dunedin since 1893 at the Dunedin Public Art Gallery, curated by Linda Tyler.

Alter / Image was also one of four inaugural exhibitions that marked the opening of City Gallery Wellington; the others were Rosemarie Trockel, Te Whare Puanga (recent weaving and tivaevae by Māori and Pacific Island women in Wellington) and He Tohu: The New Zealand Room, a site-specific project by Jacqueline Fraser.

Curators Tina Barton and Deborah Lawler-Dormer wrote in their introduction to the exhibition catalogue that for the exhibition they had 'isolated a number of subjects and strategies that we believe are common to feminist art practice. ... They include: the recovery of alternate histories and particular experiences; the recognition of the ideological basis of representation, the politics of space and the gender-specific nature of looking; the colonisation of the body; and the interactivity of gender, sexuality and identity.'

Artists featured in the exhibition were:

- Rhondda Bosworth
- Mary-Louise Browne
- Kirsty Cameron
- Margaret Dawson
- Allie Eagle
- Jacqueline Fahey
- Di Ffrench
- Alexis Hunter
- Nicola Jackson
- Robyn Kahukiwa
- Maureen Lander
- Vivian Lynn
- Lucy MacDonald
- Julia Morison
- Fiona Pardington
- Joanna Margaret Paul
- Jude Rae
- Pauline Rhodes
- Ruth Watson (artist)
- Christine Webster

The curators had sought to include Merylyn Tweedie in the exhibition but after initially agreeing the artist withdrew, on the basis that she did not want her work to be shown in an explicitly feminist context.

The exhibition mixed works from the recent past with new pieces. In their introduction Barton and Lawler-Dormer wrote:

Since the early 1970s, women artists have drawn on their experiences as women for their subject matter. It is difficult now to see how radical these initial efforts were. But for women then, it was an intensely political act to expose themselves and to describe the mundane details of their lives. It was a consciousness-raising exercise, drawing attention to the way in which women had been rendered powerless by their marginalisation and a crucial first step in a process that would acknowledge the ways in which representation itself is gendered.

Among the works representing earlier feminist art were Allie Eagle's 1978 watercolour This woman died, I care and a recreation of her 1978 work Risk, a bowl of red jelly embedded with razor blades; three paintings by Robyn Kahukiwa documenting the Māori and immigrant experience (Three kuia 1971, The migration 1973, Where are we now? 1974); and three paintings by Jacqueline Fahey examining the challenges and constraints of domestic life (Christine in the pantry 1972, Drinking couple: Fraser analysing my words 1977, Final domestic expose: I paint myself 1981). New works included site-specific installations by Pauline Rhodes, Lucy Macdonald and Maureen Lander.

The curators acknowledged that their selection did not attempt to address the way non-European women and women artists had been left out of feminist discourses. They wrote:

The 1970s and early 1980s witnessed many changes in the way women's art was viewed and the support it received. Now in the 1990s there has been a widespread acknowledgement by feminists that many of these changes excluded women of colour. The challenge for women of colour today is to find ways of working together to instigate change. In our local context, feminist dialogue often occurred without recognising the different concerns of Maori and Pacific Island women artists. Within their own communities, women's work flourished but outside the specific context of feminism. In reviewing feminist practice since 1973 we are conscious of the lack of visibility of Maori and Pacific Island women within the debates surrounding feminism, feminist theory and representation. We hope that this territory may be uncovered and exposed collectively in the near future.

Writing in Art New Zealand, critic Jane Sayles argued that the curators of the exhibition had followed current international critical discourse too closely, at the cost of addressing the specific nature of New Zealand women's art, citing 'the use of imported theory which effectively absents the local and in the process denies what I consider to be the vitally meaningful New Zealandness of the works'. However Sayles also noted that the scale of the exhibition, the publication and the accompanying film programme made it a significant endeavour in New Zealand culture.

== Film programme ==
The exhibition was accompanied by a programme of film and video works, featuring pieces by:

- Stephanie Beth
- Riwia Brown
- Barbara Cairns
- Margaret Henley
- Kirsty Cameron
- Anna Campion
- Jane Campion
- Nikola Caro
- Cushla Dillon
- Lynda Earle
- Annie Goldson
- Fiona Gray
- Jessica Hobbs
- Shirley Horrocks
- Alexis Hunter
- Kate JasonSmith
- Chris Kraus
- Deirdre MacCartin
- Alison Maclean
- Shereen Maloney
- Nicola Marshall
- Merata Mita
- Siobhan Oldham
- Christine Parker
- Joanna Margaret Paul
- Gaylene Preston
- Melanie Read
- Lisa Reihana
- Pat Robins
- Diana Rowan
- Rachel Shearer
- Belinda Smaill
- Sally Smith
- Bronwyn Sprague
- Julianne Sumich
- Bridget Sutherland
- May Trubuhovich
- Athina Tsoulis
- Vicky Yiannoutsos

== Publication ==
A substantial catalogue was produced to accompany the exhibition, edited by Barton and Lawler-Dormer and with texts by the curators, Priscilla Pitts, Cushla Parekowhai, Lita Barrie, Gloria Zelenka, Anna Miles, Bridget Sutherland, and Deborah Shepherd. A resource section featuring biographies, exhibitions histories, filmographies and bibliographies was also included. Two sections of page works by artists were included in the publication, featuring works by all 20 artists in the exhibition.
