= Christine Webster =

New Zealand visual artist and photographer

- Born: 1958 (age 67–68); Pukekohe, Auckland
- Education: Massey University, Glasgow School of Art
- Known for: Photography

Christine Webster (born 1958) is a New Zealand visual artist and photographer.

== Early life and education ==
Webster was born in 1958 in Pukekohe, Auckland. She currently lives in the United Kingdom. Webster has a Diploma in Photography from Massey University and an MFA from Glasgow School of Art. Webster has taught at the ASA School of Art, Auckland, Unitec Institute of Technology, and Elam School of Fine Art, and currently is a senior lecturer at the Cambridge School of Art.

== Career ==
Webster is a photographer and visual artist. Her work explores society's accepted boundaries and the human psyche, specifically relating to gender and identity. In the early eighties women photographers like Christine Webster took up a post modern position creating images as opposed to making a documentary record of the world around them. In doing this they introduced a more conceptual and theatrical approach that would previously been considered unthinkable. Webster started using her own body and that of friends to act out the characters in her work. A friend, and professional magician, Tim Woon appears as an over eager corporate suit, briefcase and alarm clock at the ready. In another image the briefcase opens to a magician's flash of fire. Later dancer and choreographer Douglas Wright would appear in many of Webster's photographs in many different guises. As Bridget Sullivan pointed out in the catalogue for the group show alter / image, by using a reference to ‘glossy up market advertising stills', Webster manages to' upset ideas of male control and gravity'.

== Working in series ==
Almost from the beginning of her career as an art photographer Webster tended to work in series presenting groups of photographs as a cohesive collection. These series have included:

=== New Myths (1980s) ===
These early works often featured Webster herself, both as subject and photographer. Anna Smith writing about this series described them as, “not so much daring or prurient, as jubilatory, flaming with life.”

=== Tiananmen Square (1989) ===
Webster created the series, responding to the 1989 student-led pro-democracy protests and killings in China.

=== Black Carnival (1991–1998) ===
While resident as the 1991 Frances Hodgkins Fellow in Dunedin Webster began visualising what would become one of her major series Black Carnival. When complete it would be a sequence of sixty images. Using models Webster challenged norms of the day by exploring ideas around feminism and gender roles, the shiny surfaces of the photographs incorporating the viewers into a personal conversation with the content via their mirrored image. The works were inspired by ancient wall paintings like those of the Villa of the Mysteries in Rome, Webster creating her own ‘frieze of human abandonment and decadence.' In 1993 the Dunedin Public Art Gallery commissioned a 49 sheet version of Black Carnival that is now in the gallery's collection and one of the largest photographic installations in the country. The series features a number of naked figures did not pass unnoticed. As writer Ewan McDonald commented, the exhibition contained content and ambiguities “ we often dare not admit to...” An example is the naked photograph of the cabaret artist Mika who stands straight on and stares directly into the camera. At nearly two and a half meters high the impact as noted by art writer Erin Harrington, ‘demands attention.' When Black Carnival (including the Mika portrait) toured to Hamilton a city councillor, Russ Rimmington, called the exhibition pornographic and called for its closure. “I've got a mind as broad as a Roman sewer, but this is just sleaze – it's worse than pornographic magazines like Playboy or Cleo. the exhibition went on with all works included.

=== Circus of Angels (1996) ===
A collaboration between Webster and choreographer and dancer Douglas Wright who is the model in all the photos. Webster had already worked with Wright previously on his dance Buried Venus.' In a prescient interview recorded before their meeting and collaboration Wright described an image that could only come from Webster's studio, ‘I feel there has to be the image of a woman, or else something that is neither man nor woman. We need something that is mysterious and layered and rich. It needs to read well from a distance.”

=== Other series ===
Other series include The Players (1991), Doll's House (2000), Quiet (2013) and Therapies (2014).

== Exhibitions ==
The following annotated list represents a selection of Webster's solo and group exhibitions in public art galleries and museums.

- Christine Webster: Large Colour Photographs Wellington City Art Gallery, 1982 and toured. Art writer Sheridan Keith reviewing the exhibition for Art New Zealand, mentioned how much she admired Webster's use of colour as an integral part of the work adding, "Hers is a romantic and unusual vision, concerned with the transitory elements of existence."
- Christine Webster : New Photographs Bowen galleries toured to Robert McDougall Gallery, 1984. Critic John Hurrell commented on the 'stimulating' and 'provocative' nature of the work noting their 'theatrical' quality.
- New Women Artists Govett-Brewster Art Gallery. Webster's photographs continue to be seen as an antidote to the documentary focus of most New Zealand photographers at the time. Art writer Priscilla Pitts sees it as, 'cutting right across the grain of the documentary genre...'
- Fresh Art Robert McDougall, 1985 (group) Curated by Brad Smith.
- Content / Context National Art Gallery, Wellington, 1986–1987 (group)
- New Myths Artis Gallery, 1987 and toured to Dunedin Public Art Gallery
- Sex and Sign, 1989 (group)
- Imposing Narratives: Beyond the Documentary in New Zealand Photography Wellington City Art Gallery, 1989. (group) Curated by Gregory Burke. In reviewing the exhibition critic Ian Wedde said of Webster's work, 'Christine Webster poses herself in sexual dramas that approach but then deflect the clichés of pornography and dominance.'
- The Players: a Photo series by Christine Webster Centre for Contemporary Art, Hamilton, 1991. As curator and art writer Anne Kirker noted, Webster, used her models to create 'subjective states of being' allowing them to present human conditions that were true of both sexes, a form of 'masquerade and disguise' exploring possibilities of sexuality.
- Christine Webster Possession & Mirth Hocken Library Gallery, Dunedin, 1992 (toured)
- Headlands: Thinking Through New Zealand Art, 1992 (group) Webster showed alongside other women artists including Margaret Dawson, Megan Jenkinson, Fiona Pardington and Marie Shannon all of whom, as curator Robert Leonard commented in the catalogue, 'play with the woman-as-object-paradigm in order to disperse the self in myriad disguises.'
- Black Carnival Dunedin Public Art Gallery, 1993 (toured)
- alter / image City Gallery Wellington, 1993 (group)
- Persona Cognita Museum of Modern Art at Heidi, Melbourne, 1994. Curated by Juliana Enberg.
- Open the Shutter: Auckland Photographers Now Auckland Museum, 1994. (group) Curated by Ron Browsen for PhotoForum celebrated PhotoForum's twenty-first anniversary.
- Currency: Contemporary Photographic Art Auckland War Memorial Museum, 1995. (group) Curated by Peter Turner.
- Circus of Angels Sarjeant Gallery, Whaganui, 1996
- Christine Webster Neue Mythem Museum Ludwig, Köln, 1988
- Blindfield Dunedin Public Art Gallery, 2007.
- Provocations Christchurch Art Gallery, 2010. This survey of Webster's work curated by Anne Kirker presented many of her photographic series. Before the exhibition opened the gallery removed a video work from the exhibition because of potential audience complaints.
- The Brink (group) Dunedin Public Art Gallery, 2012.

== Awards ==
- 1991 Frances Hodgkins Fellowship.
- 1988 Queen Elizabeth II Arts Council Grant
- 1989 Polaroid Small Projects Grant.

== Collections ==
Webster's work is held in the following collections:

- Bibliothèque nationale de France
- LA County Museum of Art
- George Eastman Museum
- Museum Ludwig
- Museum of Contemporary Art Australia
- Queensland Art Gallery
- Museum of New Zealand Te Papa Tongarewa,
- Auckland Art Gallery Toi o Tāmaki
