= Di ffrench =

- Born: November 9, 1946; Naarm Melbourne, Australia
- Died: May 25, 1999 (aged 52); Ōamaru, New Zealand
- Known for: photography, performance art, sculpture

Di ffrench (9 November 1946 – 25 May 1999) was a New Zealand artist working with the mediums of photography, performance art and sculpture.

== Life ==
Di ffrench was born in Melbourne, Australia, in 1946, and moved to New Zealand with her family in 1963. She attended high school in Auckland, followed by studies at the Auckland Technical Institute, and began exhibiting her work in the mid-1970s. She became a regular participant in national, individual and group exhibitions, and also worked as an art tutor at Otago Polytechnic's Ōamaru and Dunedin art schools.

In the 1980s she worked mainly in performance art in galleries. In 1990, ffrench was the Trustbank Canterbury Artist in Residence at the Christchurch Arts Centre. During the residency she worked on a specialised photography technique: she took a black and white photograph of an object and made this into a slide transparency, then projected this image onto a sculptural surface from a height and re-photographed the scene to create a new photograph.

In 1993, ffrench was commissioned by the Christchurch City Council to design a wall hanging to commemorate the centenary of women's suffrage in New Zealand. The hanging showed elements of women's lives between 1893 and 1993 and was embroidered by 100 members of the Canterbury Embroiderers' Guild, over a period of eight months. It was exhibited at the Robert McDougall Art Gallery and then installed in the Christchurch Town Hall. Also in 1993, ffrench worked on a land sculpture at Lookout Point, Ōamaru, which was shaped as a huge Chesterfield sofa and planted with wild yarrow and chamomile.

Enduring themes in ffrench's work were women's strength, both physical and mental, and aspects of passivity and aggression in society. In 2001, Robert McDougall Art Gallery displayed a retrospective exhibition titled, Di ffrench: Light and Illusion. Then, in 2009, a retrospective of ffrench's photographic work was staged at the Dunedin Public Art Gallery, and in 2012 another retrospective was held at the Temple Gallery in Dunedin. A third retrospective was held, also in Dunedin, at Gallery Fe29 in mid 2017.

== Select exhibitions ==
- Black and White Photographs and Cibachromes. 1991, McDougall Art Annex, Christchurch.
- alter/image: Feminism and Representation in New Zealand Art 1973-1993. 1993-1994, City Gallery Wellington, Auckland Art Gallery, curated by Tina Barton and Deborah Lawler-Dormer.
- And out Flew the Web. 1993, Sarjeant Gallery, Whanganui.
- Enduring Legacy. 2017, Fe29 Gallery, Dunedin.
- Di ffrench: Light and Illusion. 2000-2001, Robert McDougall Art Gallery & Annex, Christchurch.
- Slow Burn: Women and Photography | Ahi Tāmau: Māreikura Whakaahua. 1 March 2026 - 31 January 2027, Museum of New Zealand Te Papa Tongarewa, Te Whanganui-a-Tara Wellington.

== Collections ==
- Christchurch Art Gallery Te Puna o Waiwhetū.
- Museum of New Zealand Te Papa Tongarewa.
- Dunedin Public Art Gallery.
