= Jacqueline Fahey =

New Zealand writer and artist

Jacqueline Fahey ONZM
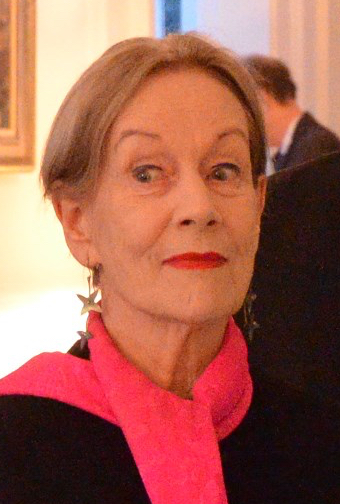
- Fahey in 2013
- Born: 1929 (age 96–97); Timaru, New Zealand
- Awards: Arts Foundation Icon Award

Jacqueline Mary Fahey ONZM (born 1929) is a New Zealand painter and writer.

== Biography ==
Of Irish Catholic ancestry, Fahey was born in Timaru in 1929. Fahey had strong female role models in her life: her mother was a pianist who attended the Melbourne Conservatoire of Music and worked as a professional pianist for 8 years before returning to New Zealand, and her grandmother taught at a Dominican Convent and was "very good at languages and loved history". "These two women were my role models, really," Fahey has commented. "They gave me the idea that women were supposed to excel even if it was primarily in the arts."

When she was eight, her family home, "Marchweil", burnt down and Fahey and her three sisters were sent to St Patrick's Dominican College, Teschemakers, Oamaru, a now-closed Catholic boarding school for girls, near Oamaru. She then studied at the Canterbury University College School of Art, graduating with a Diploma of Fine Arts in 1952. She was taught by Russell Clark, Bill Sutton, and Colin Lovell-Smith. At university she also met and befriended Rita Angus, Doris Lusk, and Juliet Peter. Though she wasn't influenced stylistically by these artists, she was inspired by their commitment to painting and to the seriousness with which they undertook their work. Fahey has commented, "It wasn't so much that they influenced the way I painted. What they did was allow me to be professional, to think of it as my life."

In 1951, Fahey moved to Wellington and in 1956 she married Fraser McDonald, a young psychiatrist who she met at a party at her flat in Wellington. During her married life, Fahey, McDonald, and their three daughters lived in houses on the grounds of psychiatric institutions in Australia and New Zealand, including the Carrington Hospital. Fraser died in 1994.

Fahey has written two memoirs about her life: Something for the Birds (2006) and Before I Forget (2012).

== Career ==
Fahey has been an active painter since the 1950s. When she was 26, she exhibited her first paintings with suburbia and marriage as their theme at Harry Seresin's Coffee Gallery on Lambton Quay in Wellington, where she was working as a waitress.

In 1964, Fahey organised an exhibition with artist Rita Angus at the Centre Gallery in Wellington. This exhibition included an equal number of female and male artists and was one of the first exhibitions in New Zealand to take an intentionally gender-balanced curatorial approach. Fahey has commented, "It was a huge social success, because, to my astonishment, Rita was very social. I mean, she had connections, and she got an ambassador to open it [the exhibition], and asked all the rich people, you know, the right people to ask to an opening, and it was very successful.

In 1980, Fahey was awarded a QEII Arts Council Award to travel to New York and study painting. Specifically, Fahey wanted to "find out what circumstances helped women artists to survive in a male-dominated profession in New York". In New York, Fahey stayed at the Chelsea Hotel, made contacts at A.I.R Gallery (the first all female artists cooperative gallery in the United States), and spent time with artists Sylvia Sleigh and Isabel Bishop.

Her work increased in prominence in the 1980s, through galleries such as the Women's Gallery, established in Wellington in 1980, which sought to provide exposure to women's art and question the often patriarchal structures of the art world and market.

During the 1980s and 1990s, Fahey taught painting at the Elam School of Fine Arts at the University of Auckland. At the time of her appointment as lecturer, over half the painting students were women, but there were no women lecturers. Fahey joined Robert Ellis (artist), Don Binney, and Dick Frizell on the painting staff and enjoyed the experience of teaching, learning alongside her students, and sharing ideas with her colleagues.

Fahey was appointed an Officer of the New Zealand Order of Merit, for services to art, in the 1997 New Year Honours.

In 2007, Fahey's paintings Christine in the Pantry (1972) and Sisters Communing (1974) were included in the major exhibition WACK! Art and the Feminist Revolution at the Museum of Contemporary Art in Los Angeles.

In 2013, she received an Arts Foundation Icon Award, the Foundation's highest honour.

== Art ==
Fahey is credited as being one of the first painters in New Zealand to paint from a female perspective and examine the domestic subjects of contemporary women's existence: children, the home, marriage, community life, and relationships. Fahey has said: "Art should come from what an artist knows about life, and if what a woman knows is not what a man knows, then her art is going to have to be different." Owing to their subject matter and approach, Fahey's paintings are closely associated with the wider societal women's liberation and feminist movements of the 1970s and 1980s.

During many of her years as a practicing artist, Fahey did not have a studio, but instead painted on a large trolley, surrounded by the activities and energy of her family and household and following the action as it unfolded. As such, Fahey's paintings depict the detail, disorder and minutiae of domestic life, but simultaneously disrupt it, by playing with perspective and space within and across the image's frame. Objects pile on top of each other, surfaces are intricately patterned, and figures merge with their surroundings. The oil painting Christine in the Pantry (1973), held in the collection of Aigantighe Art Gallery in Timaru, is an example of Fahey's manipulation of space, patterning, and depiction of everyday, prosaic objects. The women in Fahey's paintings often look directly out at the viewer, challenging or questioning the gaze directed at them. For example, in the painting Final Domestic Expose – I paint Myself (1981–1982), held in the collection of the Auckland Art Gallery Toi o Tāmaki, Fahey is shown calmly contemplating the viewer whilst surrounded by a maelstrom of children, food, washing, cosmetics, and other objects associated with family life.

Fahey often uses an impasto style of painting, where the paint is applied thickly and her brushstrokes are clearly evident to the viewer. For example, see the texture of the paint in "Fraser sees me, I see myself" from 1975, now in the collection of the Museum of New Zealand Te Papa Tongarewa. Here, Fahey does not disguise the materiality of the paint, but allows it to sit in thick layers on the canvas.

In her work, Fahey also combines paint with collaged elements, such as the labels of food packaging, photographs, and other ephemera. For example, see the combination of Tanqueray and Schweppes labels, and photographs, in the painting "Mother and daughter quarrelling" (1977) from the collection of the Christchurch Art Gallery Te Puna o Waiwhetū. In the opening essay in the catalogue for the exhibition "alter/image", staged in 1993, curators Christina Barton and Deborah Lawler-Dormer write that Fahey's "disruptions operate not only 'within' the world of the picture, but also 'at' the surface, where representational registers collect and clash."

Though Fahey's paintings depict domestic life, the artist has expressed her antipathy for housework, and has written, "Whatever domestic skills I acquired were hard won. I found it all time absorbing and boring...When war broke out household help went into war work and we four girls were sent off to boarding school. Consequently I was bereft of domestic skills when I married. Cooking? I lacked that essential ingredient, confidence. Household tasks seemed like servitude to me. I tried, I really did, but I quickly understood that without painting I felt no personhood."

Throughout her career Fahey has expressed a strong commitment to both the local environment and politics of Aotearoa New Zealand and to her figurative style. She never considered moving into abstraction, though she has acknowledged that there are abstract qualities in her work and would often turn her paintings upside down in order to reflect on the balance of colour and composition.

Fahey's paintings can be found in major public and private art collections across New Zealand, including Victoria University of Wellington's art collection, Museum of New Zealand Te Papa Tongarewa, Christchurch Art Gallery, Aigantighe Art Gallery in Timaru, the Hocken Collection at the University of Otago, and the University of Auckland's art collection.

== Selected solo exhibitions ==
- 1973 Victoria University of Wellington
- 1974 John Leech Galleries, Auckland
- 1978–79 Barry Lett Galleries, Auckland
- 1983 RKS Art, Auckland
- 1983 Galerie Legard, Wellington
- 1983 Auckland Art Gallery, Artist in Focus, 1983: Jacqueline Fahey Some Paintings
- 1988 Brooker Gallery, Wellington
- 2017 Where my eye leads, Te Uru Waitakere Contemporary Gallery, Auckland
- 2018 Jacqueline Fahey: Say Something!, Christchurch Art Gallery Te Puna o Waiwhetu
- 2019 Jacqueline Fahey's Suburbanites, New Zealand Portrait Gallery Te Pūkenga Whakaata, Wellington.

== Selected group exhibitions ==
- 1977 Young Contemporaries, Auckland City Art Gallery
- 1981 Mothers, The Women's Gallery touring exhibition
- 1984 Anxious images, Auckland City Art Gallery
- 1985 Perspecta Art Gallery of New South Wales, Sydney
- 1992 Home Made Home Wellington City Art Gallery
- 1993 Alter/Image: Feminism and Representation in New Zealand Art 1973–1993, City Gallery Wellington and Auckland Art Gallery
- 2007 WACK! Art and the Feminist Revolution, Museum of Contemporary Art, Los Angeles

== Publications ==
- Something for the Birds (Auckland: Auckland University Press, 2006) ISBN 978-1-86940-355-3
- Before I Forget (Auckland: Auckland University Press, 2012) ISBN 978-1-86940-581-6
