= Maureen Lander =

New Zealand weaver, multimedia installation artist and academic

Maureen Lander MNZM
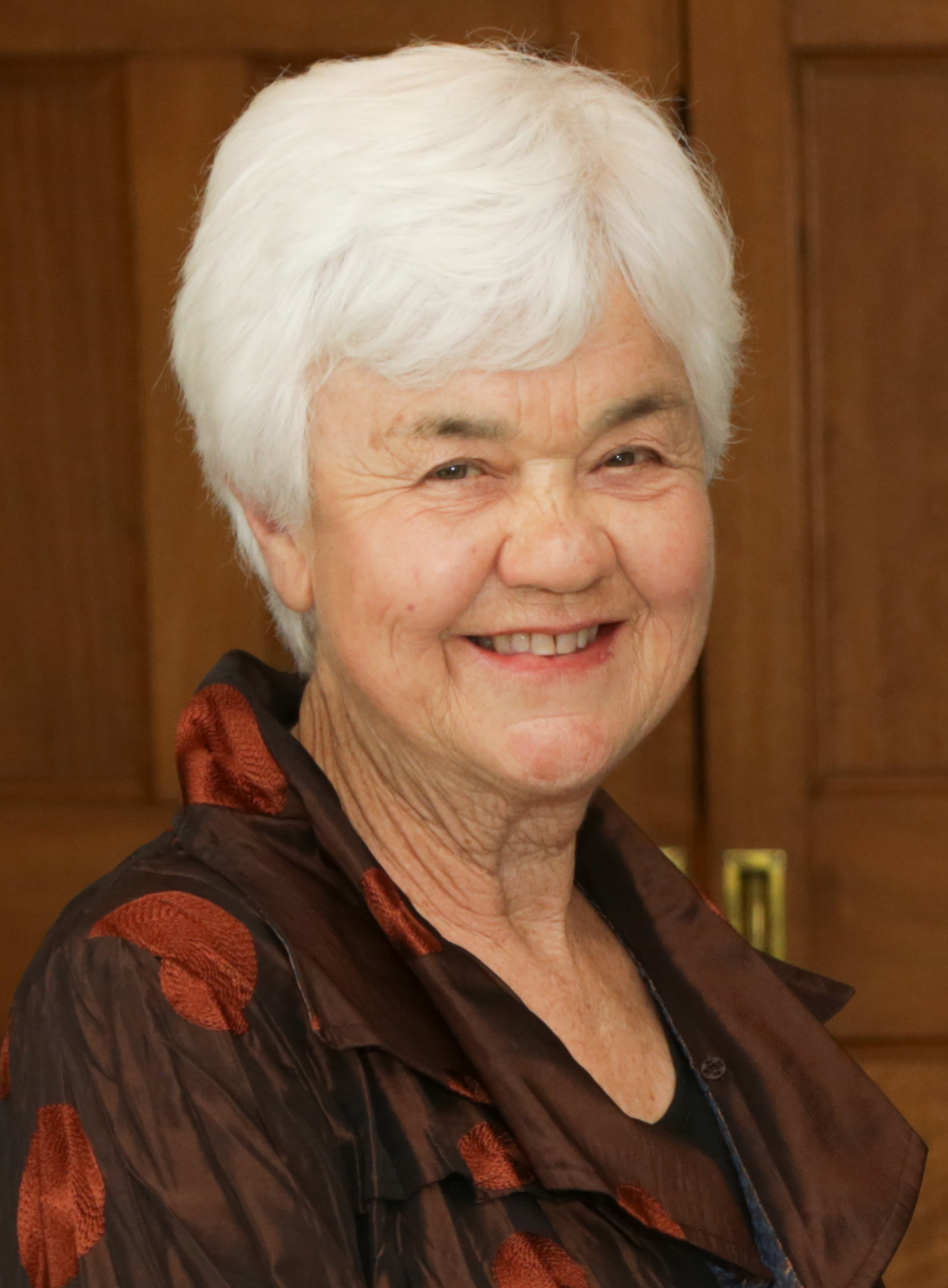
- Lander in 2020
- Born: 1942 (age 83–84); Rawene, New Zealand
- Education: Elam School of Fine Arts
- Known for: Arts
- Scientific career
- Thesis: In Sites : the predicament of place : personal perspectives and intercultural viewpoints on aspects of site related art (1993)

Maureen Robin Lander MNZM (born 1942 in Rawene) is a New Zealand weaver, multimedia installation artist and academic. Lander is of Ngāpuhi (Te Hikutu subtribe) and Pākehā (New Zealand European) descent and is a well-respected and significant artist who since 1986 has exhibited, photographed, written and taught Māori art. She is a registered Toi Iho artist. She continues to produce and exhibit work as well as attend residencies and symposia both nationally and internationally.

== Education ==
Lander began learning weaving with noted Māori weaver Diggeress Te Kanawa in 1984 and spent many years researching fibre arts. The title of her 1993 master's thesis was In Sites: the predicament of place: personal perspectives and intercultural viewpoints on aspects of site related art. In 2002 she was the first person of Māori descent to gain a Doctorate in Fine Arts at a New Zealand university.

- 1963 Wellington Teachers' College
- 1987 Bachelor of Fine Arts (Photography) Elam School of Fine Arts, University of Auckland
- 1989 Bachelor of Arts in Māori Studies, University of Auckland
- 1993 Masters of Fine Arts (Sculpture), First Class Honours, Elam School of Fine Arts, University of Auckland
- 2002 Doctor of Fine Arts, Elam School of Fine Arts, University of Auckland

== Career as an educator ==
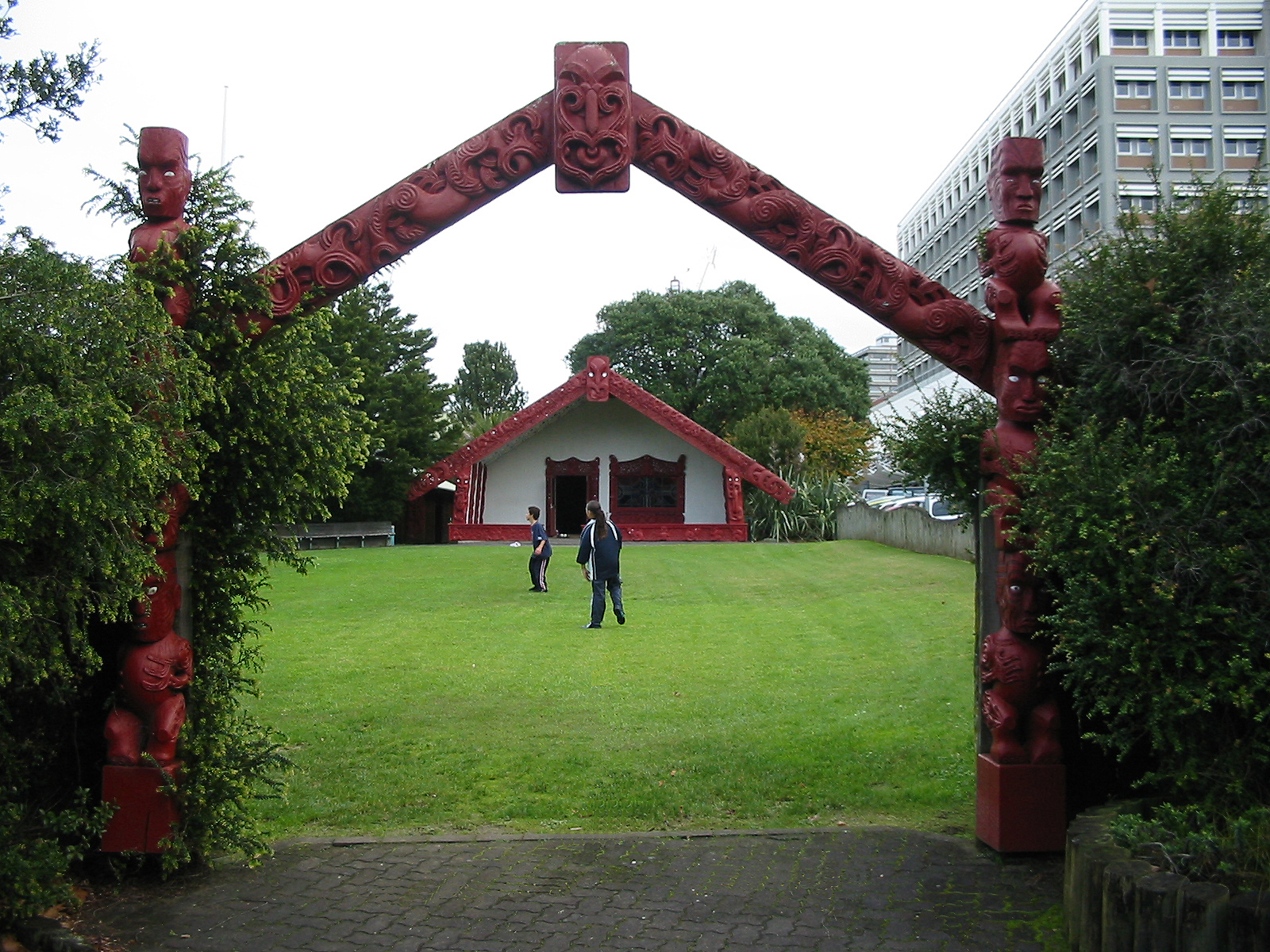
Waipapa Marae at Auckland University next to the Māori department and where some Māori studies teaching takes place.

Lander worked as a teacher before attending Elam School of Fine Arts. From 1986 she worked as a photographer for the University of Auckland's Department of Anthropology. She taught Māori fibre arts over many years, mainly in the Māori Studies Department at the University of Auckland where she was a Senior Lecturer in Māori Material Culture. In 2007 she retired from university lecturing.

== Work ==
Lander was first introduced to muka (flax fibre) by noted weaver Diggeress Te Kanawa in 1984, when she went to stay several times with the senior artist at Ohaki Maori village, near Waitomo and learned the basics of preparing materials and techniques such as whatu (finger twining). Her end of year installation at Elam, titled Te Kohanga Harakeke ('The Flax Nest') included a structure covered in milled flax in the shape of a massive inverted nest, which sheltered a young harakeke (flax) plant.

Lander's first public art exhibition was as part of the group exhibition Karanga Karanga at the Fisher Gallery (now Te Tuhi Centre for the Arts, Pakuranga, Auckland) in 1986. She describes her three decades working with muka as a 'journey of discovery'. In a recent artist statement Lander said:

I was seduced by the beauty and magic of muka. My first public installation in 1986 – E kore koe e ngaro he kakano i ruia mai i Rangiatea in the Karanga, Karanga exhibition – featured whenu (warp threads) and aho (weft threads) that I had carefully prepared to make my first korowai. Instead, I suspended them in an ethereal cloud-like formation over a swirl of flax seed.

In 1998 art historian Priscilla Pitts wrote that Lander's combination of 'conventional university art school' study and training with traditional Māori weavers was reflected in her work:

Though much of her work is a response to weaving arts, Lander seldom actually weaves – at least, in the works she exhibits in gallery spaces. Rather, she uses, often to astonishing effect, the materials used in traditional Maori weaving and dying. These include pingao and feathers, but most of all harakeke (New Zealand flax) in all its forms – its leaves, its handsome flower and seed heads, the seeds and muka (the fine silky fibre obtained from the leaves). With these she combines materials from the Western world.

Pitts gives Lander's 1994 work This is not a kete, made for the exhibition Art Now at the former Museum of New Zealand (now the Museum of New Zealand Te Papa Tongarewa) as an example of the way her work combines traditional Māori crafts and Western sculptural or installation practices. Lander's work plays on René Magritte's famous painting Ceci n'est pas une pipe with a woven kete (flax basket) placed on top of a plinth with the words 'This is not a kete' inscribed on it. More kete were arranged on the floor of the gallery and dramatically lit. Pitts writes

'Here, in the context of the art exhibition, 'practical' objects – simple woven flax bags – are elevated to the status of art objects. ... However, this particular art exhibition was located in what was also an ethnography and history museum, within which the collection, cataloguing, and display of things like kete divorces them from their cultural, spiritual and/or utilitarian contexts and transforms them into artefacts.

In 2006 Lander was one of fifteen New Zealand artists, most of Māori and Pacific Island descent, who were invited to take part in the Pasifika Styles exhibition by making site-specific works throughout the Museum of Archaeology and Anthropology, University of Cambridge that responded to objects in the museum's collection. For the exhibition Lander reworked two previous commissions, This is not a kete and pieces from Mrs Cook's kete, a 2002 collaboration with Christine Hellyar at the Pitt Rivers Museum at Oxford University. Lander also made new pieces, including the site-specific installations Airy-Theory Artefacts (woven objects suspended in front of a screened window) and Tane Raises His Eyebrows (a crescent-shaped weaving placed over a decorative wooden door lintel). She also made a piece titled Crown Grab Bag for the exhibition, a large woven crown placed on a royal purple silk pillow with gold tassels. In the publication accompanying the exhibition, Museum of Archaeology and Anthropology curator Anita Herle wrote

The work references the New Zealand Foreshore and Seabed Act of 2004, which empowered the New Zealand government, 'the Crown', to override tribal rights to pursue customary claims to the foreshore and seabed through the courts. Lander's crown is delicately woven from a variety of fibres, including plant materials that grow along the foreshore – the creation of the crown itself is thus a subtle but defiant act of re-appropriation. Shells and fishing hooks from the museum's collection are placed on the base of the case. Strands of pingao fibre, stitched into the fabric lining at the back of the case, form inverted U-shapes representing the raised eyebrows of Tane (god of the forest). According to Māori legend, following a dispute between Tane and Tangaroa (god of the sea) Tane's eyebrows were flung onto the sand dunes, which mark the liminal space between the forest and the sea. Here Lander connects contemporary political conflicts to legendary battles.

Responding to objects and taonga held in cultural institutions' collections remains a strong feature of Lander's work. In a 2015 exhibition at the National Library of New Zealand (a collaboration with Christine Hellyar and Jo Torr) Lander made a number of works relating to works in the library's art and archival collections. Her piece Hariata’s War Garb is inspired by Joseph Merrett's 1846 watercolour The Warrior Chieftains of New Zealand. The portrait depicts Hone Heke, the chief Kawiti, and Heke's wife Hariata. Hariata is shown wearing a woven sash unlike anything Lander had seen before. Researching her own family history, Lander found descriptions of Hariata written by her great-great grandfather James Johnston Fergusson. One document describes Hariata leading 700 men; another as being ‘young, tall, and rather goodlooking’, wearing ‘a tartan dress with red sash slung around her shoulders like a shepherd’s plaid’. Lander recreated the sash for the exhibition, along with a number of other pieces. In a review of the exhibition art historian Jill Trevelyan noted that Lander drew on her own experience learning weaving under Diggeress Te Kanawa to produce the works Rongo's samplers, a reimagining of the first works produced by a new practitioner.

In 2017 Lander began a tuakana/teina (mentor/mentee) relationship with Mata Aho Collective, a group of four wahine Māori (Māori women) artists. In 2021 their collaborative work Atapō was awarded the biennal Walters Art Prize.

In 2023 Maureen Lander, in collaboration with artist Denise Batchelor and composer Stìobhan Lothian, created the online artwork Hukatai ~ Sea Foam as part of the international art project World Weather Network. Lander and Batchelor came together to monitor the hukatai (sea foams) through walks on the shoreline of Te Hokianga Nui a Kupe, the Hokianga Harbour, in north-west New Zealand. These walks were documented through a series of lens-based observations which became a fibre installation as part of the 2023 Te Tuhi exhibition Huarere: Weather Eye, Weather Ear curated by Janine Randerson.

== Selected exhibitions ==
Lander began exhibiting her artwork in 1986. Having exhibited both nationally and internationally, Lander currently enjoys exhibiting with other artists in the small communities around the Hokianga where her ancestors lived.

- 2023 Aho Marama: Strings of Light, Christchurch Art Gallery
- 2021 Atapō, with Mata Aho Collective, Walters Art Prize, Auckland Art Gallery Toi o Tamaki
- 2021-2020 Toi Tu Toi Ora: Contemporary Maori Art, Auckland Art Gallery Toi o Tamaki, Auckland
- 2018 Hariata’s War Garb (part of The Ngāpuhi Festival), Northcote College, Auckland
- 2017 Flat-Pack Whakapapa, The Dowse Art Museum and touring throughout 2018; The Delicate Balance of Wobbling Stars, Corban Estate Arts Centre
- 2015 Te Wā Tōiri: Fluid Horizons, Auckland Art Gallery: an exhibition from the collections of the gallery including Lander's major installation work Hou Angiangi (2003). The Māori title of the exhibition was suggested by Lander.; Tell tails, National Library of New Zealand, Wellington, with Christine Hellyar and Jo Torr
- 2014 Flag It, The Depot, Devonport and No 1, Parnell St Gallery, Rawene
- 2013 Towards the Morning Sun Campbelltown Arts Centre, Sydney; whetu-whenu-whenua Lopdell House Gallery (off-site), Titirangi
- 2012 Kahu Ora/Living Cloaks Museum of New Zealand Te Papa Tongarewa
- 2011 An Ephemeral Practice Northart Gallery, Te Taumata series, Auckland Matariki Festival
- 2010 Site specific fibre installation, Arataki Visitor Centre, Waitakere Regional Park, Auckland; Where are we? Lopdell House Gallery, Titirangi
- 2009 Hotere Country Village Arts, Kohukohu, Hokianga; Kauwae 09 Mangere Arts Centre, Nathan Homestead, Manurewa and Tairawhiti Museum, Gisborne
- 2008 POST-Stitch Lopdell House Gallery, Titirangi
- 2007 Conversations Across Time: Whakawhiti Korero Canterbury Museum, Christchurch
- 2006–2008 Pasifika Styles Cambridge Museum of Archaeology and Anthropology, UK
- 2005 Palm Lines in collaboration with Samuel Wagan Watson and Anne Kirker Museum of Brisbane
- 2004–2005 Shade House in collaboration with Robert Sullivan and Briar Wood, Whangarei Art Museum, Lopdell House Gallery, Titirangi, and Pataka Art + Museum
- 2004–2007 The Eternal Thread: Te Aho Mutunga Kore Pataka Museum + Art, Porirua, then touring to venues in NZ and United States
- 2002 Mrs Cook’s Kete Pitt Rivers Museum, Oxford, UK, with Christine Hellyar
- 2001 Purangiaho Auckland City Art Gallery
- 1998 haze in collaboration with Kaylynn Two Trees and Toi Te Rito Maihi, New Gallery- Auckland Art Gallery
- 1997 Nga Uri o Rahiri Govett Brewster Art Gallery, New Plymouth
- 1995 Korurangi New Gallery, Auckland Art Gallery
- 1994 Art Now, Museum of New Zealand Te Papa Tongarewa
- 1993 Pū Manawa Museum of New Zealand Te Papa Tongarewa; 1993 Alter / Image, City Gallery Wellington

== Selected publications ==
- Lander, M.R. Horeke or Kohukohu? Charles Heaphy's "View of the Kahukahu, Hokianga River 1839", Turnbull Library Record, Vol XXII, No 1:33–40, 1989
- Lander, Maureen Robin (1992). "Fibre Fragments from the Raupa Site, Hauraki Plains". Records of the Auckland Institute and Museum. 29: 7–23. JSTOR 42906422. Wikidata Q58677421.
- Lander, M.R. & Wood, B. Glorified Scales Auckland: Maureen Lander, 2001
- Lander, M.R., Sullivan, R, & Wood, B. Shade House Whangarei: Whangarei Art Museum, 2004
- Lander, M.R. & Maihi, T. He Kete He Korero Auckland: Reed Publishing, 2005
- Lander, M. R. 'Te Ao Tawhito/Te Ao Hou. Entwined Threads of Tradition and Innovation' in Whatu Kakahu/Māori Cloaks (ed. Awhina Tamarapa), Wellington: Te Papa Press 2011, pp. 60–73 ISBN 9781877385568

== Honours and awards ==
- 2021, Walters Art Prize winner (with Mata Aho Collective)
- 2020 Appointed a Member of the New Zealand Order of Merit, for services to Māori art, in the 2020 Queen's Birthday Honours
- 2019 Ngā Tohu ā Tā Kingi Ihaka | Sir Kingi Ihaka Awards recognising lifetime contribution, Te Waka Toi Awards
- 2002 Inaugural Māori Academic Excellence Award (Fine Arts, Music & Performing Arts), ‘Te Tohu Toi Ururangi’ sponsored by Toi Maori.
- 1992 Graduate Scholarship, University of Auckland
- 1985 Senior Prize in Fine Arts, Elam School of Fine Arts, University of Auckland
- 1984 Annual Prize in Māori Studies, University of Auckland

== Residencies ==
- 2013 Campbelltown Arts Centre, Sydney.
- 2010 ARC Artist-in-Parks residency, Titirangi.
- 2010 Artist-in-Residence, Parramatta Artists’ Studios, West Sydney.
- 2009 Hancock Fellow at the Victorian Tapestry Workshop, Melbourne.
- 2006 Pasifika Styles at CUMAA.
- 2006 Kilmartin House Museum in Scotland
- 2002 Artist in Residence, Nelson Marlborough Institute of Technology, Nelson.
- 1996 The Performance Space Centre, Redfern, Sydney.

== Personal life ==
Lander is of Ngāpuhi, Te Hikutu, Irish, Scottish and English (Yorkshire) descent.

== Further information ==
- Dr Maureen Lander – Māori weavers making the most of the changing world, video interview by the Museum of New Zealand Te Papa Tongarewa
- Elenaor Wenman, Whakapapa and taonga celebrated at double exhibition opening, DominionPost, 18 July 2017
- Mata Aho Collective, An Art Matriarch: Why Maureen Lander is a Boss, Pantograph Punch, 7 August 2017
- Sonja van Kerkhoff, The Colonial Bonnet as War Garb, EyeContact, 18 July 2018
- Interview with Mata Aho Collective and Maureen Lander, Auckland Art Gallery, 2021
- Kerry Lander and Maureen Lander, The Maureen Lander Archive, Christchurch Art Gallery Bulletin, 24 November 2023
- Moya Lawson, String Games, Christchurch Art Gallery Bulletin, 24 November 2023
