= Find New Zealand Artists =

Database of New Zealand artists

Find New Zealand Artists (FNZA) is a database that was created in 2013 by Auckland Art Gallery Toi o Tāmaki and Christchurch Art Gallery Te Puna o Waiwhetu. It was compiled from the records held by 12 New Zealand art galleries and libraries and at the outset contained information on over 17,000 New Zealand artists.

The project began as a collaboration between Catherine Hammond of the AAG and Jenny Harper of the CAG and received an initial grant from Te Papa National Services.

As of March 2021, the web-based database holds records on more than 20,000 artists.
