= Megan Jenkinson =

New Zealand photographer

Megan Lillian Jenkinson
- Born: 1958 (age 66–67); Hamilton, New Zealand
- Known for: Photography

Megan Lillian Jenkinson (born 1958) is a New Zealand photographer.

== Background ==
Jenkinson was born in 1958 in Hamilton, New Zealand.

== Career ==
Jenkinson works primarily as a photographer and is an associate professor at the Elam School of Fine Arts.

In December 2005, Jenkinson traveled to the Antarctica as part of the Artists to Antarctica fellowship programme. Her photographs taken during this time we exhibited during the 2008 Photography Festival at Two Rooms Gallery and in 2007 at the Jonathan Smart Gallery in Christchurch.

In 2007, Jenkinson won the Jury Award at the Wallace Art Awards with her work Atmospheric Optics V. She has received the 1989 Montana Lindauer Art Award and the Graphics Prize at the 1999 Sharjah International Art Biennal.

Work by Jenkinson is held in the public collections of the Museum of New Zealand Te Papa Tongarewa; the Sarjeant Gallery, Govett-Brewster Art Gallery, Dunedin Public Art Gallery, Auckland Art Gallery Toi o Tāmaki, Aigantighe Art Gallery, Victoria and Albert Museum, Bibliothèque nationale de France, Centre Georges Pompidou, Museum of Fine Arts (Houston), Art Gallery of New South Wales, and National Gallery of Australia. She is represented in Auckland by Two Rooms and Christchurch by Jonathan Smart Gallery.

=== Exhibitions ===
Jenkinson has exhibited for over thirty years, both in New Zealand and internationally. Exhibitions include:

- 2016, The Coincident Present, Two Rooms, Auckland
- 2016, Other Space, Jonathan Smart Gallery, Christchurch
- 2014, Double Vision, Bartley + Company Art, Wellington (with Mary-Louise Browne)
- 2014, So Last Century, Jonathan Smart Gallery, Christchurch (group show)
- 2014, phyto-plasts, Two Rooms, Auckland
- 2011, Drift, Two Rooms, Auckland
- 2009, Second Silence, Jonathan Smart Gallery, Christchurch
- 2007, The Dark Continent, Jonathan Smart Gallery, Christchurch
- 2004, Afterword: The Colours, Colour Codes, and Cloud of Unknowning, Jonathan Smart Gallery, Christchurch
- 1999, Sharjah Biennale (group show)
- 1996, The Virtues (touring show)
- 1990, The Readymade Boomerang: Certain Relations in 20th Century Art (Sydney Biennale, group show)
- 1989, Esslingen Photo Triennale (group show)
- 1989, Photography Now, Victoria and Albert Museum (group show)
