= Fiona Pardington =

New Zealand photographer (born 1961)

Fiona Pardington ONZM
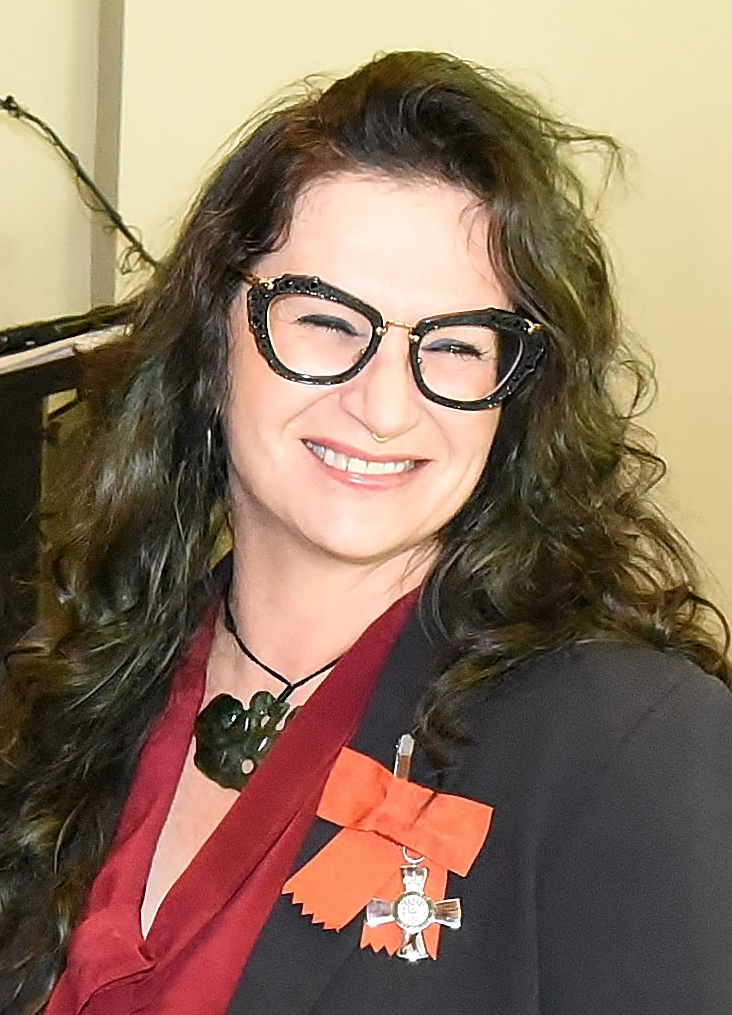
- Pardington in 2024
- Born: Fiona Dorothy Cameron; 1961 (age 64–65); Devonport, New Zealand
- Education: Elam School of Fine Arts (BFA, 1984; MFA, 2003; DocFA, 2013)
- Known for: Photography
- Awards: Chevalier Ordre des Arts et des Lettres (2016); Arts Foundation Laureate Award (2011); Visa Gold Art Award (1991, 1997)
- Website: fionapardington.blogspot.co.nz

Fiona Dorothy Pardington ONZM (née Cameron; born 1961) is a New Zealand artist, her principal medium being photography.

== Early life and education ==
Pardington was born Fiona Dorothy Cameron in 1961 in Devonport, and was brought up on Auckland's Hibiscus Coast, where she attended Orewa College. She descends from three Māori iwi, (Ngāi Tahu, Kāti Māmoe and Ngāti Kahungunu), and the Scottish Clan Cameron of Erracht. Pardington knew she wanted to become a photographer from the age of six when she and her brother Neil were given their first cameras. She studied photography at Elam School of Fine Arts, University of Auckland graduating with a Bachelor of Fine Arts in 1984.

In 2003, Pardington graduated from Elam School of Fine Arts with a Master of Fine Arts (First Class Honours) and in 2013 graduated with a Doctor of Fine Arts in photography with a doctoral thesis titled Towards a Kaupapa of Ancestral Power and Talk. She has throughout her career held the positions as a lecturer, tutor, assessor and moderator on photography, design and fine arts programmes at universities and polytechnics throughout New Zealand.

Pardington's brother Neil Pardington (11 months her junior) is also a well-known photographer and book designer.

== Career, themes and style ==
Early in her career, Pardington worked from a feminist viewpoint to explore themes of love and sex, the representation and perception of the body, and the construction of gender and identity. She specialised in 'pure' or analogue darkroom techniques, most notably hand printing and toning.

In the 1980s, borrowing from early, highly romanticized pictorialist photography, Pardington challenged the social construction of the eternal feminine by making theatrical photographs of the female nude.

In 1990, Pardington won the Moet et Chandon New Zealand Art Foundation Fellowship. She won the Visa Gold Art Award in 1991 for Soft Target, a work framed with beaten, studded copper and gold-painted wood, that is encrusted with contradictory religious images and texts.

Pardington was the recipient of the Frances Hodgkins Fellowship at the University of Otago in both 1996 and 1997. In 1997 Pardington won the Visa Gold Art Award for a second time with Taniwha, 1996, a close up of a bar of soap, a colonial relic with an appropriated Māori name.

In 2001, Pardington was the Auckland Unitec Institute of Technology Artist in Residence and began a body of work examining extant collections of cultural objects or taonga (treasures) in New Zealand's museums.

In 2005, the New Zealand Government gifted the Quai Branly Suite of Nine Hei tiki to the people of France. Pardington is one of two Māori artists represented by the Musee du Quai Branly.

In 2006, Pardington was the Ngāi Tahu artist in residence at the Otago Polytechnic, during which time she studied and photographed nests from the Otago Museum collection.

In 2010, Pardington completed a Laureate Artistic Creations Project with the Musée du Quai Branly, photographing more than fifty casts of Māori, Pacific and European heads, including casts of her Ngāi Tahu ancestors, held in the Musée Flaubert et d’Histoire de la Medecine in Rouen, Muséum National d'Histoire Naturelle in Paris and in the Auckland War Memorial Museum. The casts made in the Pacific region during Dumont d’Urville’s last exploratory voyage of 1837–40 by the phrenologist Pierre-Marie Alexandre Dumoutier (1791–1871) included three tattooed warriors: Tangatahara and Piuraki (who are Ngāi Tahu) and Matua Tawai (from Kororāreka). Originally exhibited in vitrines outside the Musée du Quai Branly in Paris, Ahua: A beautiful hesitation, was selected to be exhibited at the 17th Biennale of Sydney in May 2010, and was allocated a dedicated gallery space in the Museum of Contemporary Art Australia. The series is illustrated in The Pressure of Sunlight Falling, published by Otago University Press and was exhibited at the Govett-Brewster Art Gallery, New Plymouth and Dunedin Public Art Gallery in 2011.

Pardington's work Ake Ake Huia, holds the auction record for a single New Zealand photograph having sold in 2010 for NZ$30,385. Pardington's major work, the Quai Branly Suite of Nine Hei Tiki, holds the auction record for a New Zealand photographic work having sold in 2010 for NZ$64,278. This was one of only two complete sets made by the artist with the other set having been gifted to the people of France by the New Zealand government.

Pardington's still-life imagery made in 2012 and 2013 have a painterly quality that visually reference seventeenth-century painting traditions as well as the 16th-century vanitas traditions. The images are not only memento mori in the provision of poetic signs of time passing and things dying – from dandelion clocks to gecko skins – but of cultures meeting across seas.

In 2013, Pardington completed a three-month artist's residency at the Colin McCahon House in Titirangi, Auckland.

A major survey of Pardington's work, Fiona Pardington: A Beautiful Hesitation, featuring more than 100 photographs, was held at City Gallery Wellington in August – November 2015. The exhibition travelled to Auckland Art Gallery in 2016.

In February 2016, it was announced that Pardington had been selected by curator Fumio Nanjo for the first Honolulu Biennale, to be held in 2017.

Pardington will represent New Zealand at the 2026 Venice Biennale.

== Fellowships, residencies and awards ==
Pardington (left), after her investiture as an Officer of the New Zealand Order of Merit by the governor-general, Dame Cindy Kiro, at Government House, Wellington, on 16 September 2026

- 1991 Visa Gold Art Award
- 1991 Moet & Chandon Fellow, France
- 1996 Frances Hodgkins Fellow
- 1997 Visa Gold Art Award
- 2001 Auckland Unitec Artist in Residence
- 2006 Ngāi Tahu residency at Otago Polytechnic
- 2010 Laureate Artistic Creations Project with the Musee du Quai Branly, France
- 2011 Arts Foundation Laureate Award recipient
- 2013 Colin McCahon House Artists’ Residency
- 2016 Chevalier Ordre des Arts et des Lettres
- 2017 Appointed a Member of the New Zealand Order of Merit in the Queen's Birthday Honours, for services to photography.

In the 2025 King’s Birthday Honours, Pardington was promoted to Officer of the New Zealand Order of Merit, for services to photography.

== Notable exhibitions ==
Solo exhibitions

- 2024 Te Taha o te rangi, Starkwhite
- 2023 Tāku Huia Kaimanawa: Fiona Pardington, MTG Hawke's Bay
- 2022 Te Whitinga o Te Pō (The Shining Lady Of The Night), Dowse Art Museum
- 2021 Tarota, Starkwhite
- 2019 - 2020 TIKI: Orphans of Māoriland, Starkwhite; Christchurch Art Gallery Te Puna o Waiwhetū
- 2018 Fiona Pardington: Soft Paradise / Ka Rongo Te Pō, Ka Rongo Te Ao, Tauranga Art Gallery
- 2017 Nabokov’s Blues: The Charmed Circle, Starkwhite
- 2015–2016 Fiona Pardington: A Beautiful Hesitation, City Gallery Wellington, Auckland Art Gallery, Christchurch Art Gallery Te Puna o Waiwhetu
- 2014 lux et tenebris, Momentum Worldwide, Berlin
- 2014 Fiona Pardington: Supernatural – Nature, Morte and Ripiro Beach, Roslyn Oxley9 Gallery, Sydney, Australia
- 2014 Fiona Pardington: Three Works Puke Ariki, Lane Gallery; Govett-Brewster Art Gallery
- 2011 The Pressure of Sunlight Falling, Govett-Brewster Art Gallery and Dunedin Public Art Gallery
- 2001 One Night of Love, Waikato Museum of Art and History

Group exhibitions

- 2023 - 2024 Te Hau Whakatonu: A Series of Never-Ending Beginnings, Govett-Brewster Art Gallery
- 2017 On the Origin of Art, MONA – Museum of Old and New Art, Hobart, Tasmania
- 2016 Life inside an Image, Monash University Museum of Art, Melbourne
- 2016 Oceania, Gow Langsford Gallery, Auckland, AU
- 2016 Imprint, Art Gallery of New South Wales, Sydney, AU
- 2015 Whano Kē: Change and Constancy in Māori Art Today, Auckland Art Gallery Toi o Tāmaki
- 2015 Dead Ringer, Perth Institute of Contemporary Arts
- 2013 Among the Machines: Australian and New Zealand Artists, Dunedin Public Art Gallery
- 2012 Contact, Frankfurter Kunstverein, Germany
- 2012 Arsenale, Kyiv International Biennale of Contemporary Art, Ukraine
- 2011 Tender is the night, City Gallery Wellington
- 2010 17th Biennale of Sydney
- 2010 Unnerved: The New Zealand Project, Queensland Art Gallery and National Gallery of Victoria
- 2009 Photographer Unknown, Monash University Museum of Art
- 2009 Brought to Light, Christchurch Art Gallery Te Puna o Waiwhetu
- 2007 Photoquai, Musée du Quai Branly
- 2006 Mo Tatou: The Ngāi Tahu Whanui exhibition, Museum of New Zealand Te Papa Tongarewa
- 2003 Te Puāwai o Ngāi Tahu: Twelve contemporary Ngāi Tahu artists, Christchurch Art Gallery
- 1996 Cultural Safety, City Gallery Wellington and Frankfurter Kunstverein
- 1993 Alter / Image, City Gallery Wellington

== Publications ==
- Stuart McKenzie, Rising to the Blow, Épernay, France : Moet et Chandon, 1992. ISBN 978-0-473-01649-4
- Kyla Macfarlane, One Night of Lovee, Hamilton: Waikato Museum of Art & History, 2001. ISBN 978-0-908750-18-4
- Gina Irish, The Heart Derelict, Dunedin: Otago Polytechnic, 2006. ISBN 978-0-473-13745-8
- Fiona Pardington, Journey of the Sensualist, Whanganui: McNamara Gallery, 2008. ISBN 978-0-9582724-2-1
- Roger Boyce, Eros & Agape, Wellington: Suite Gallery, 2010.
- Andrew Paul Wood, Blood & Roses, Christchurch: Jonathan Smart Gallery, 2011. ISBN 978-0-9864582-0-0
- Andrew Paul Wood, Mushrooms: the champignons Barla, Christchurch: A.P. Wood Publishing, 2011. ISBN 978-0-473-19503-8
- Kriselle Baker and Elizabeth Rankin, Fiona Pardington: the pressure of sunlight falling, Dunedin: Otago University Press, 2011. ISBN 978-1-877578-09-0
- Aaron Lister et al., Fiona Pardington: A Beautiful Hesitation, Wellington: Victoria University Press, 2015. ISBN 978-1-77656-054-7

== Public collections ==
- Musée du Quai Branly
- National Gallery of Canada, Ottawa, Canada
- National Gallery of Art, Washington DC, USA
- Queensland Art Gallery/Gallery of Modern Art
- National Gallery of Victoria
- Te Papa
- Auckland Art Gallery
- Christchurch Art Gallery
- Govett-Brewster Art Gallery
- Dunedin Public Art Gallery
- University of Auckland Art Collection, Auckland, New Zealand
- Victoria University of Wellington Art Collection, Wellington, New Zealand
- Chartwell Collection, Auckland, New Zealand
