= Vivian Lynn =

New Zealand artist

- Lynn in 1971
- Born: Vivian Isabella Robertson; 30 November 1931; Wellington, New Zealand
- Died: 1 December 2018 (aged 87); Wellington, New Zealand
- Education: Ilam School of Fine Arts; Auckland Teachers' Training College
- Known for: Contemporary art
- Notable work: Works held in public collections at Auckland Art Gallery, Museum of New Zealand Te Papa Tongarewa, Christchurch Art Gallery
- Style: Print, drawing, painting, sculpture

Vivian Isabella Lynn (née Robertson; 30 November 1931 – 1 December 2018) was a New Zealand artist.

== Education ==
Lynn was born in Wellington in 1931 and attended Wellington Girls' College from 1945 to 1948. She completed a Diploma of Fine Arts at the School of Fine Arts at Canterbury University College majoring in painting in 1952, and a Diploma of Teaching at Auckland Teachers' Training College in 1954. At art school her lecturers included Rata Lovell-Smith, Bill Sutton and Russell Clark. According to Lynn, the curriculum was focused on the history of Western art, with little attention given to New Zealand or contemporary art, although she did meet artists such as Colin McCahon, Toss Woollaston, Doris Lusk and Rita Angus and see their work in The Group exhibitions.

== Support for the women's art movement ==
Lynn was one of the first New Zealand artists to address feminist issues in their work, beginning in 1968. She was an active supporter of the women's art movement in New Zealand and in 1983–84 was involved in setting up the Women's Art Archive.

Lynn was featured in a special issue of the New Zealand feminist magazine Broadsheet published in 1983, focused on feminist art. In an interview Lynn discussed how during World War II she had seen both her parents working in jobs, raising their children and sharing family chores. She continued:

There was value placed on women’s work because it was politically expedient for it to be so in the early 1940s ... so I had formative years where I was conditioned to expect equality. But social values changed after the War as women were required to be wives and mothers again, rather than members of the paid workforce. A profession and marriage were again presented as mutually exclusive.

== Work ==
Lynn worked across a wide range of media, including collages, drawings, paintings, prints, books, sculptures, photographs and installations.

In 1972, Lynn spent a year in the United States, where she developed her interest in printmaking; throughout the 1970s she worked with this medium, producing works such as Book of Forty Images (1973–1974) and Playground,, which explore 'the reasons behind women's social and political oppression'.

Between 1977 and 1979, Lynn produced a series of works on paper, now held in the Christchurch Art Gallery, in which she reworked drawings and life studies made at art school, in a comment on 'the sexual politics of the Western art historical tradition'.

Lynn is probably best known for her large installation works of the early 1980s. Guarden Gates (1982) (first shown at the Janne Land Gallery, now in the collection of the Museum of New Zealand Te Papa Tongarewa) is a sculptural installation of seven cyclone-wire mesh gates, woven through with human hair and ribbon. Each piece is titled to reflect cultural stages of a female life: Matrix; Daughter of the father; Sacrifice; Processual ground; Differentiation; Rebirth and Eyes of life, eyes of death. Lynn said, "In my hair pieces of 1982 I have come closer to the toxic object image I need. I want a toxic image that physically shocks – the conscious levels are split open – not the safe anchorage." Lynn's contribution to the 1982 Wellington sculpture festival F1 Sculpture Project Mantle, was an installation based around a rectangular construction made up of hair collected over several weeks from local hair salons. Another work using hair, Stain, which gives the illusion of a stream of human hair trickling down the cathedral's marble steps, was installed for the 'New Art in Dunedin' project in 1984.

Art historian Priscilla Pitts notes that 'Lynn frequently sought equivalents or proxies for the female body, and this led to a particularly inventive use of materials'. In Guarden Gates, in one work, she set up a frisson by including a small amount of processed animal tissue as a metaphor for the human body. In Lamella/Lamina (1983), a sculptural installation of 15 fragile columns, Lynn used architectural drawing paper processed to create texture, the work itself being installed at Anzart in Hobart in response to threatened rain forest on the Franklin River. The artist said that the columns were, amongst other things, 'a metaphor for vulnerability, sensitivity, and how one toughens up as one gets older ... Lamella/Lamina reflects the layering and interconnectedness, of nature and culture, of skin surface, mind and the political.'

Gates of the Goddess – a southern crossing attended by the Goddess (1986, first shown at the Govett-Brewster Art Gallery and now in the collection of the Auckland Art Gallery) consists of three large panels, two of which form a passageway for the viewer and the third being a focal point with the form of the goddess. The work brings together many of Lynn's concerns particularly healing the abject as in the 1982 work Mantle. By recovering destroyed and damaged tapa, drawing attention to the low status (craft) assigned to women's production and by analogy to reproduction Lynn creates a work of simple beauty.

Between the late 1980s and 2008, Lynn worked with her own DNA imagery in Drawing Connections and her interest in the mind and brain with Rorschach imagery titled Your Mental Set and Mind Field. In 1997 her large installation, showing nine images of her brain, titled Spin: versor versa was shown at City Gallery, Wellington.

A survey exhibition of Lynn’s work titled I, HERE, NOW: Vivian Lynn, curated by Christina Barton, was held at the Adam Art Gallery at Victoria University of Wellington in 2008–09.

Lynn's work is held in public collections throughout New Zealand, including Auckland Art Gallery, the Museum of New Zealand Te Papa Tongarewa and Christchurch Art Gallery.

Senior Curator at the Dowse Art Museum Melanie Oliver had this to say about her:

"Vivian's practice was wide-ranging and spanned many significant developments in art in Aotearoa New Zealand. She forged a unique pathway, posing questions around the nature/culture discourse, ecology, identity, a repressed feminine and dominant masculine culture."

Lynn was a teacher also and taught for many years at the Wellington Polytechnic School of Design (now Massey University).

== Death ==
Lynn died in Wellington following a long illness on 1 December 2018, the day after her 87th birthday.

== Exhibitions ==
Vivian Lynn's solo exhibitions include:

- 1971 Vivian Lynn prints and paintings, New Vision Gallery, Auckland
- 1978– Taupatauma, environmental project, Colombo Street, Wellington
- 1982 A survey 1972–80 and new work, City Art Gallery, Wellington (now City Gallery Wellington)
- 1983 Twist, National Art Gallery, Wellington (now Museum of New Zealand Te Papa Tongarewa)
- 1986 The Goddess gateway: a southern crossing attended by the goddess, Govett Brewster Art Gallery, New Plymouth
- 1986 Vivian Lynn – Caryatid, Installation project 2, City Art Gallery, Wellington
- 1993 Vivian Lynn: Guarden gates and related works, Museum of New Zealand Te Papa Tongarewa
- 1997 Spin: versor versari, City Gallery Wellington
- 1999 Mantles, maladies, mutations and Prussian blue, Manawatu Art Gallery, Palmerston North (now Te Manawa)
- 2008 I, HERE, NOW Vivian Lynn, Adam Art Gallery, Wellington

Group exhibitions in which Lynn has participated include:

- 1963 Contemporary New Zealand Painting 1963, Auckland City Art Gallery (now Auckland Art Gallery
- 1966 New Zealand Painting 1966, Auckland City Art Gallery
- '1966 Group of seven: painting, Dunedin Public Art Gallery
- 1980 Opening exhibition, City Art Gallery, Wellington
- 1980 Women in communication, National Art Gallery, Wellington
- 1981 Me by myself: the self portrait, National Art Gallery, Wellington
- 1983 Lamella-lamina, ANZART-in-Hobart, Hobart, Australia
- 1983 Lamella-Asherim, 4+1, Dowse Art Museum, Lower Hutt
- 1984 Aspects of recent New Zealand art: anxious images, Auckland City Art Gallery (and touring)
- 1986 Content/Context: a survey of recent New Zealand art, National Art Gallery and Shed 11, Wellington
- 1989 Community of women, National Art Gallery, Wellington
- 1991 Art and organised labour, Wellington City Art Gallery
- 1992 The sacred way: 22 Wellington artists explore the spiritual dimension, Wellington City Art Gallery
- 1993 Alter image: negotiating feminism and representation in recent New Zealand art 1973–1993, City Gallery Wellington
- 1996 Sharp and shiny: fetishism in New Zealand art, Govett-Brewster Art Gallery, New Plymouth
- 2008 We are unsuitable for framing, Museum of New Zealand Te Papa Tonagrewa
- 2009 Role, Play, Enjoy Public Art Gallery, Wellington
- 2018 Embodied Knowledge, The Dowse Art Museum
