= Rhondda Bosworth =

New Zealand artist and photographer

Rhondda Bosworth (born 1944) is a New Zealand photographer.

== Life ==
Bosworth was born in Takapuna, Auckland in 1944. She studied painting and photography at the University of Canterbury and the University of Auckland.

In 1975 she was part of the exhibition Six Women Artists, organised by Allie Eagle at the Robert McDougall Art Gallery in Christchurch, exhibiting with Stephanie Sheehan, Joanna Harris, Helen Rockel, Joanne Hardy, and Jane Arbuckle.

In 1989–1990, Bosworth's work was included in Imposing Narratives, a photographic exhibition which toured New Zealand.

In 2015, Bosworth's work was included in an exhibition on New Zealand women artists at the Adam Art Gallery in Wellington, Interior Histories: Fragments Of A World At 40.
