= Zanobi Machiavelli =

Italian painter

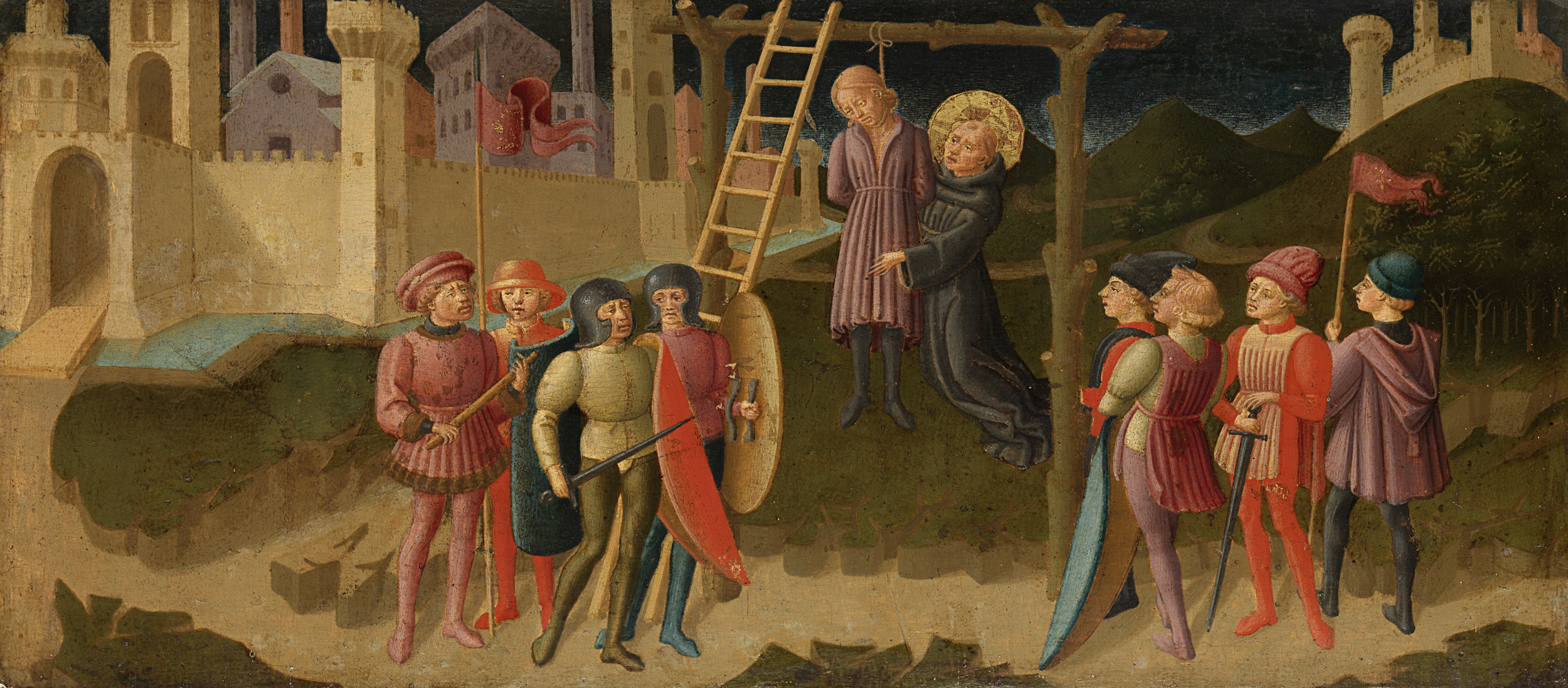
Saint Nicholas of Tolentino Saves a Hanged Man, by Zanobi Machiavelli, Rijksmuseum, 1470

Zanobi Machiavelli (1418–1479) was an Italian painter and illuminator.

Machiavelli specialized in religious themed pieces. Some of his works reside at the National Gallery, London, and the Dunedin Public Art Gallery. He died in Pisa in 1479.
