= Mary-Louise Browne =

New Zealand artist (born 1957)

Mary-Louise Browne (born 1957) is a New Zealand artist, best known for her public word ladders, and other works using text. Her works are held in the permanent collections of the Te Papa, Auckland Art Gallery and the Govett-Brewster Art Gallery.

== Education ==
Browne graduated from Elam School of Fine Arts in 1982 with an MFA First class honours.

== Career ==
Browne has exhibited widely in New Zealand and internationally, and is known for her public commissions including the award-winning Byword, a series of nine stone benches running the length of Lorne Street in Auckland. Browne has had a text-based conceptual practice and uses text in lieu of imagery to convey social and political commentaries.

Browne was the first director of Auckland artist-run gallery space Artspace, opened in reaction to the direction Auckland Art Gallery was taking with its move towards high-end imported historical shows of artists like Claude Monet. Browne was succeeded as director by Priscilla Pitts, an art historian.

== Notable works ==
- Body to Soul, a granite staircase inscribed with a word ladder transitioning from 'body' to 'soul'. This public commission was installed in 1996 on Norwood Path in Wellington Botanic Garden, with funding from Creative New Zealand and Wellington City Council.
- Meteorol, a word ladder staircase on display at the Brick Bay winery sculpture trail
- Byword, a set of 9 black granite seats on Lorne Street, Auckland Central, installed in 2007
- Font, a shallow fountain surrounded by text, installed in St Patrick's Square, Auckland CBD in 2009.
- Golden, a non-text-based work for Te Tuhi Billboards in 2010.

== Gallery ==
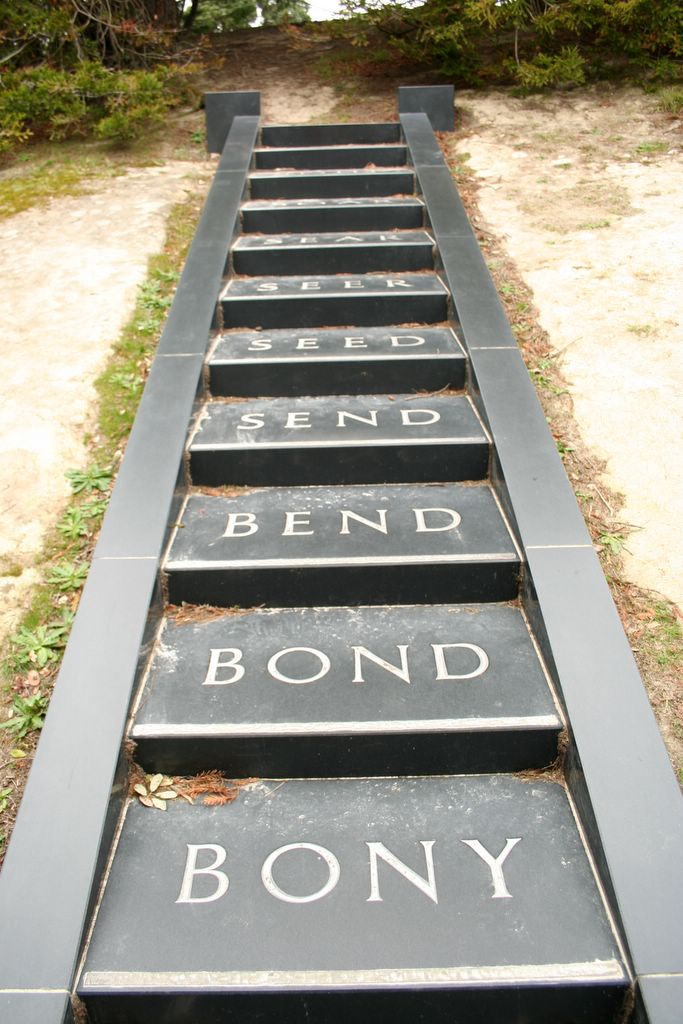
Body to Soul (1996) in the Wellington Botanic Garden

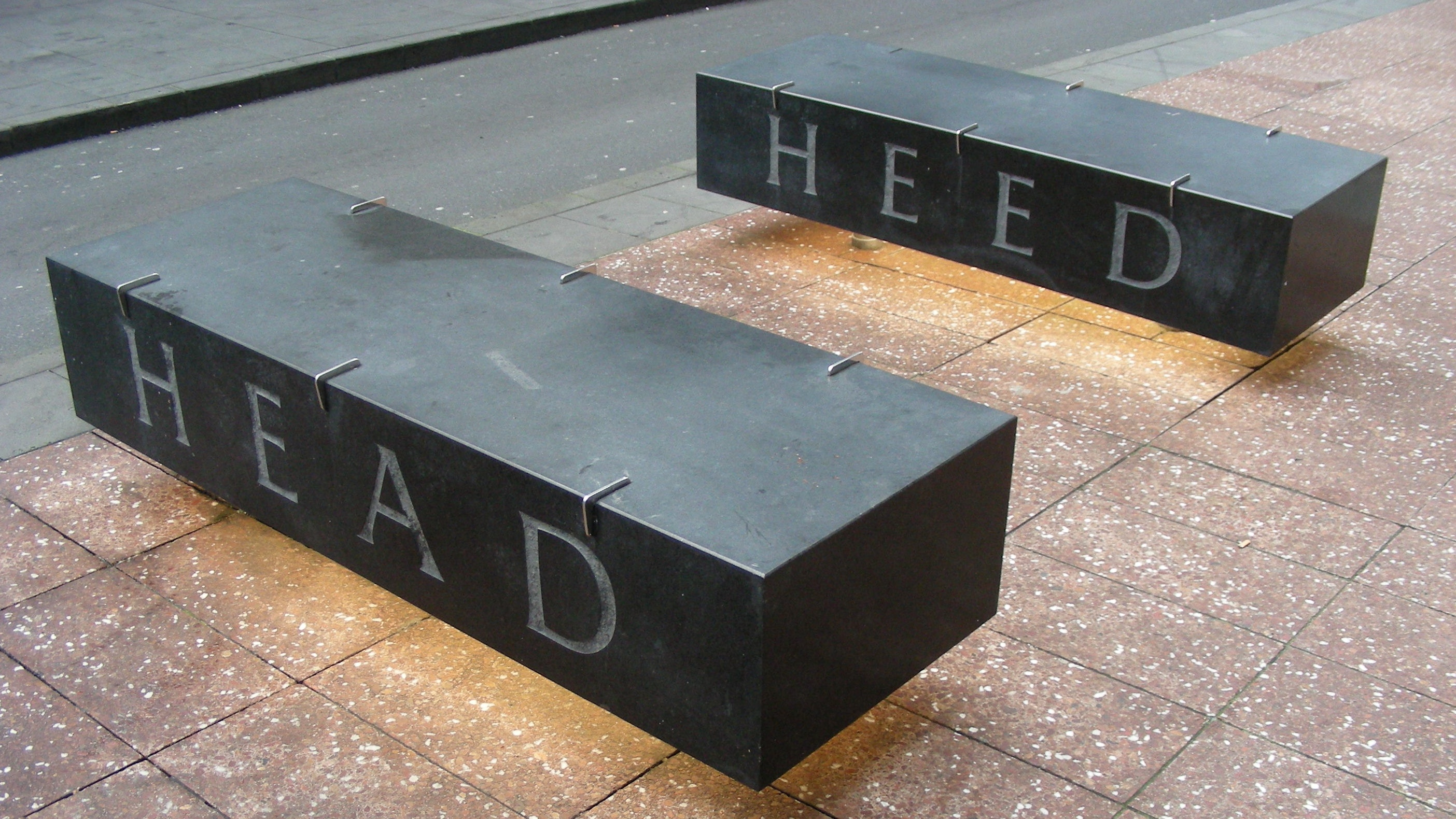
Byword (2007) on Lorne Street, Auckland

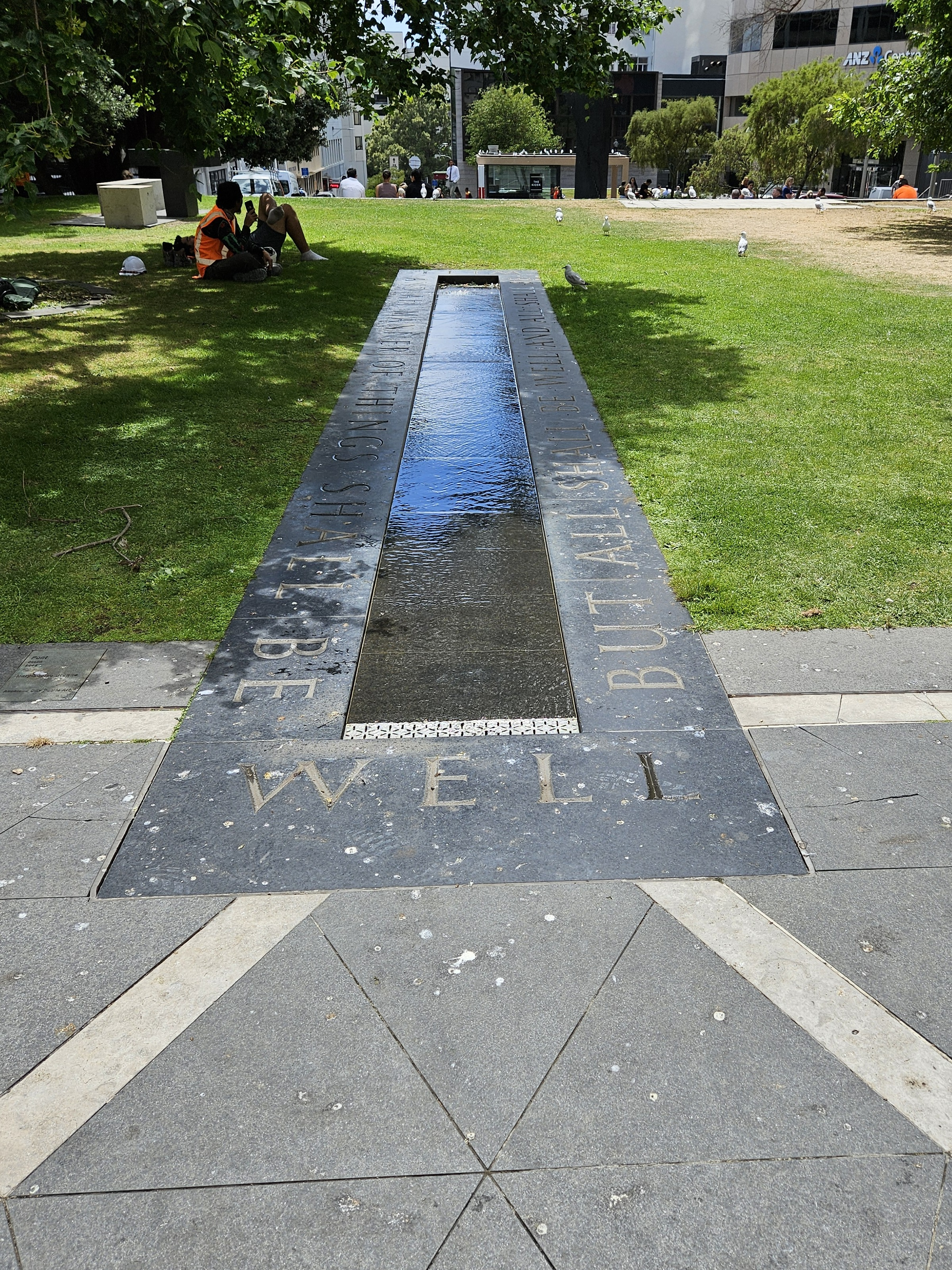
Font (2009) at St Patrick's Square, Auckland
