= Tina Barton =

New Zealand art historian and curator

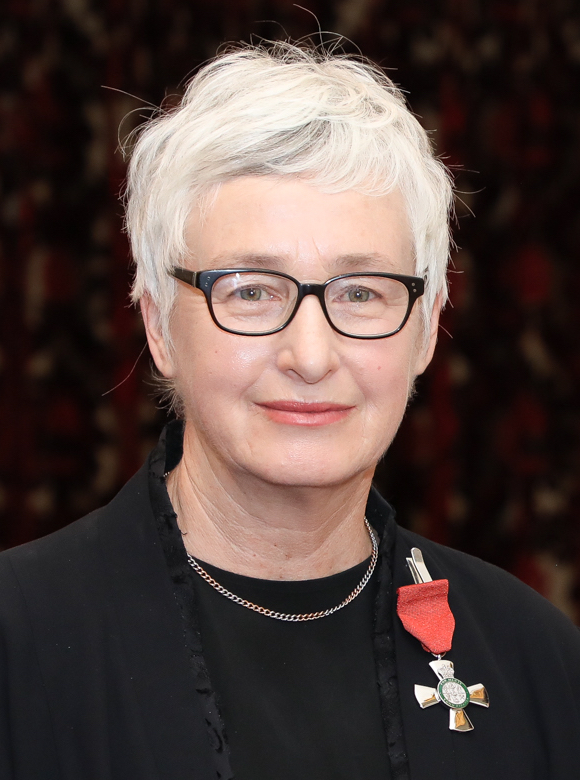
Barton in 2021

Christina Joy Barton MNZM (born 1958), known as Tina Barton, is a New Zealand art historian, curator, art writer and editor. She was director of the Adam Art Gallery between 2007 and 2023.

== Education ==
Barton completed a Masters of Art in art history at the University of Auckland in 1987. Her thesis topic was the history of post-object art in New Zealand between 1969 and 1979. She was awarded a Higher Doctorate for her published work in art history in 2022.

== Career ==
After completing her MA, Barton joined the Auckland Art Gallery as a research assistant. She worked as Assistant Curator at Auckland Art Gallery from 1988 to 1992, and as Curator of Contemporary New Zealand Art at the Museum of New Zealand Te Papa Tongarewa from 1992 to 1994. During her time at Te Papa Barton curated Art Now, a major survey exhibition of contemporary New Zealand art practice intended to become a biennial event, a hope which did not materialize. She also co-curated, with Deborah Lawlor-Dormer, Alter / Image: Feminism and representation in New Zealand art 1973–1993, an exhibition organised to mark the centennial of women's suffrage in New Zealand.

From 1995 to 2007, Barton lectured in the Art History department at Victoria University of Wellington. During this time she continued to curate exhibitions, including Guests and Foreigners, Rules and Meanings (Te Kore), a major installation by Joseph Kosuth at the then-recently opened Adam Art Gallery at Victoria University.

Barton was appointed director of the Adam Art Gallery in April 2007. Significant exhibitions she has curated for the gallery include:

- I, HERE, NOW: Vivian Lynn (2007)
- Anthony McCall: Drawing with Light (2010)
- Dark Sky (2012) (with Geoffrey Batchen)
- Beautiful Creatures: Jack Smith, Bill Henson, Jacqueline Fraser (2013)
- Simon Denny: The Personal Effects of Kim Dotcom

In 2014, Barton co-edited a major anthology of art critic Wystan Curnow's writing with curator Robert Leonard. The Critic's Part: Wystan Curnow Art Writings 1971–2013 was published by Victoria University Press and described by critic Jill Trevelyan as 'more than a collection of essays: it serves as an insight into the development of New Zealand art, illuminating a period of rapid change'. In the same year she was a juror for the 2014 Walters Prize.

In 2015, Barton curated Billy Apple®: The Artist Has to Live Like Everybody Else, a survey exhibition of Billy Apple's work for Auckland Art Gallery. Barton has worked consistently with Apple; previous exhibitions include The Expatriates: Frances Hodgkins and Barrie Bates in 2004 and Billy Apply: New York 1969–1973 in 2009, both at the Adam Art Gallery.

In the 2021 New Year Honours, Barton was appointed a Member of the New Zealand Order of Merit, for services to art history and curation.

== Publications ==
- Billy Apple® : a Life in Parts, Auckland: Auckland Art Gallery, 2015. ISBN 9780864633002
- Tina Barton and Robert Leonard, with Thomasin Sleigh, The critic's part : Wystan Curnow art writings 1971–2013, Wellington: Victoria University Press, 2014. ISBN 9780864739322
- Beautiful Creatures: Jack Smith, Bill Henson, Jacqueline Fraser, Wellington: Adam Art Gallery, 2013.
- I, here, now / Vivian Lynn, Wellington: Adam Art Gallery, 2010. ISBN 1877309176
- The expatriates: Frances Hodgkins and Barrie Bates , Wellington: Adam Art Gallery, 2004. ISBN 1877309044
- Ground/work: The art of Pauline Rhodes, Wellington: Adam Art Gallery & Victoria University Press, 2002. ISBN 0864734336
- Joseph Kosuth Guests and Foreigners, Rules and Meanings (Te Kore), Wellington: Adam Art Gallery, 2000. ISBN 9781877309007
- Art now : the first biennial review of contemporary art, Wellington: Museum of New Zealand Te Papa Tongarewa, 1994. ISBN 0909010196
- Tina Barton and Deborah Lawler-Dormer, Alter/image : feminism and representation in New Zealand art, 1973–1993, Wellington: Wellington City Art Gallery, 1993. ISBN 0908818149
- Surface tension : ten artists in the '90s, Auckland: Auckland Art Gallery, 1992. ISBN 9780864631886
- Louise Henderson : the cubist years, 1946–1958, Auckland: Auckland Art Gallery, 1991. ISBN 0864631952
- After McCahon : some configurations in recent art, Auckland: Auckland Art Gallery 1989. ISBN 0864631715

=== Articles ===
- 'Image/World : recent work by Andrew Beck', Art New Zealand, no. 156, Summer 2015/2016, pp. 68–71
- 'Round table : the state of art and discourse in New Zealand', Reading Room, Auckland: Auckland Art Gallery, 2009
- 'Not getting it', New Zealand Books, vol. 18, no. 3, Spring 2008, p. 7
- 'New horizons : New Zealand in Venice', Art New Zealand, no. 101, Summer 2001/2002, pp. 41–44,90–91
- 'Hammond's place', Art New Zealand, no. 97, Summer 2000/2001, pp. 66–69
- 'Joseph Kosuth in New Zealand', Art New Zealand, no. 96, Spring 2000, pp. 60–64
- 'Slipping through the net of art history', New Zealand Books, vol. 8, no. 4, October 1998, pp. 8–9
- 'Pushing the envelope : developments at the Govett-Brewster Art Gallery', Art New Zealand, no. 87, Winter 1998, pp. 56–59
- 'Vivian Lynn's Semi(r)otics', Art New Zealand, no. 79, Winter 1996, pp. 54–57
- 'Uncanny spaces : recent paintings by Caroline Williams', Art New Zealand, no. 75, Winter 1995, pp. 57–59
- 'Ten years on : reviewing the terrain for women in art in New Zealand', Art New Zealand, no. 68, Spring 1993, pp. 50–52
- 'David Tremlett at Artspace : a model for cultural exchange', Art New Zealand, no. 65, Summer 1992/1993, pp. 60–63
- 'Pleasures and dangers', Stamp, no. 29, March 1992, p. 30
- 'The last small world : Jim Allen's NZ environment No. 5', Midwest, no. 1,1992, pp. 29–31
- Christina Barton and Priscilla Pitts, 'Unearthing nature : land projects by 4 artists, 1969–1980', Antic, no. 5, June 1989, pp. 75–96

== Further information ==
- "Interview with Tina Barton". RNZ National. 14 September 2009.
