= Mary McIntyre (New Zealand artist) =

New Zealand artist (born 1928)

- Born: 1928 (age 97–98); Auckland, New Zealand
- Education: Elam School of Fine Art (summer school)
- Known for: Painting
- Notable work: An All New Zealand Enterprise 2; The Birth of Adonis, or Portrait of three prominent men, or The Kiwi cup of tea; Moa summer

Mary McIntyre (born 1928) is a New Zealand artist. Her works are included in major art collections in New Zealand and Australia.

== Background ==
McIntyre was born in Auckland, New Zealand. She began painting while living and working in Waikato, where her husband was a farmer. In 1966 she attended an Elam School of Fine Arts Summer School in Auckland and was tutored by Colin McCahon. After the summer school she returned to Waikato, later moving to Hamilton, and then Auckland. She also traveled to London and Italy where she was exposed to the Italian Renaissance masters. She is primarily self-taught and became a full-time artist in 1980.

== Career ==
McIntyre is known for her realist works in which she creates ambiguous, often surreal, narratives. Influenced by the style and composition of Northern Italian and Renaissance art, she became known in New Zealand as a realist figurative painter. Her landscapes take New Zealand as their subject, specifically the volcanoes of Auckland. She is also known for her portraits, frequently painting herself as the protagonist. Her works often challenge political correctness and contain barbed humour or shafts of discomfort.

Notable works include: An All New Zealand Enterprise 2 (c. 1983); The Birth of Adonis, or Portrait of three prominent men, or The Kiwi cup of tea (1981); Moa summer (c. 1993).

Her works are included in the collections of the Auckland Art Gallery Toi o Tāmaki, Museum of New Zealand Te Papa Tongarewa, Waikato Museum of Art and History, James Wallace Arts Trust, and the National Museum of Australia.

=== Exhibitions ===
McIntyre has exhibited prolifically since the 1960s, contributing to more than fifty group shows and over thirty solo exhibitions including:

- Sofia's Frieze (2017) at whitespace, Auckland, New Zealand
- The Art of Mary McIntyre (2016) at Waikato Museum Te Whare Taonga o Waikato
- Then and Now (2016) at whitespace, Auckland, New Zealand
- UNease (2011) at Pah Homstead
- Head 2 Head (2010 joint show with Martin Ball) at the New Zealand Portrait Gallery
