= Adam Art Gallery =

- Te Pātaka Toi
- Adam Art Gallery logo
- Established: 1999
- Location: Victoria University of Wellington, Gate 3, Kelburn Parade, Wellington, New Zealand
- Coordinates: 41.2886°S 174.7690°E
- Type: Art gallery
- Collections: Victoria University Art Collection
- Director: Abby Cunnane
- Owner: Victoria University of Wellington
- Website: www.adamartgallery.nz

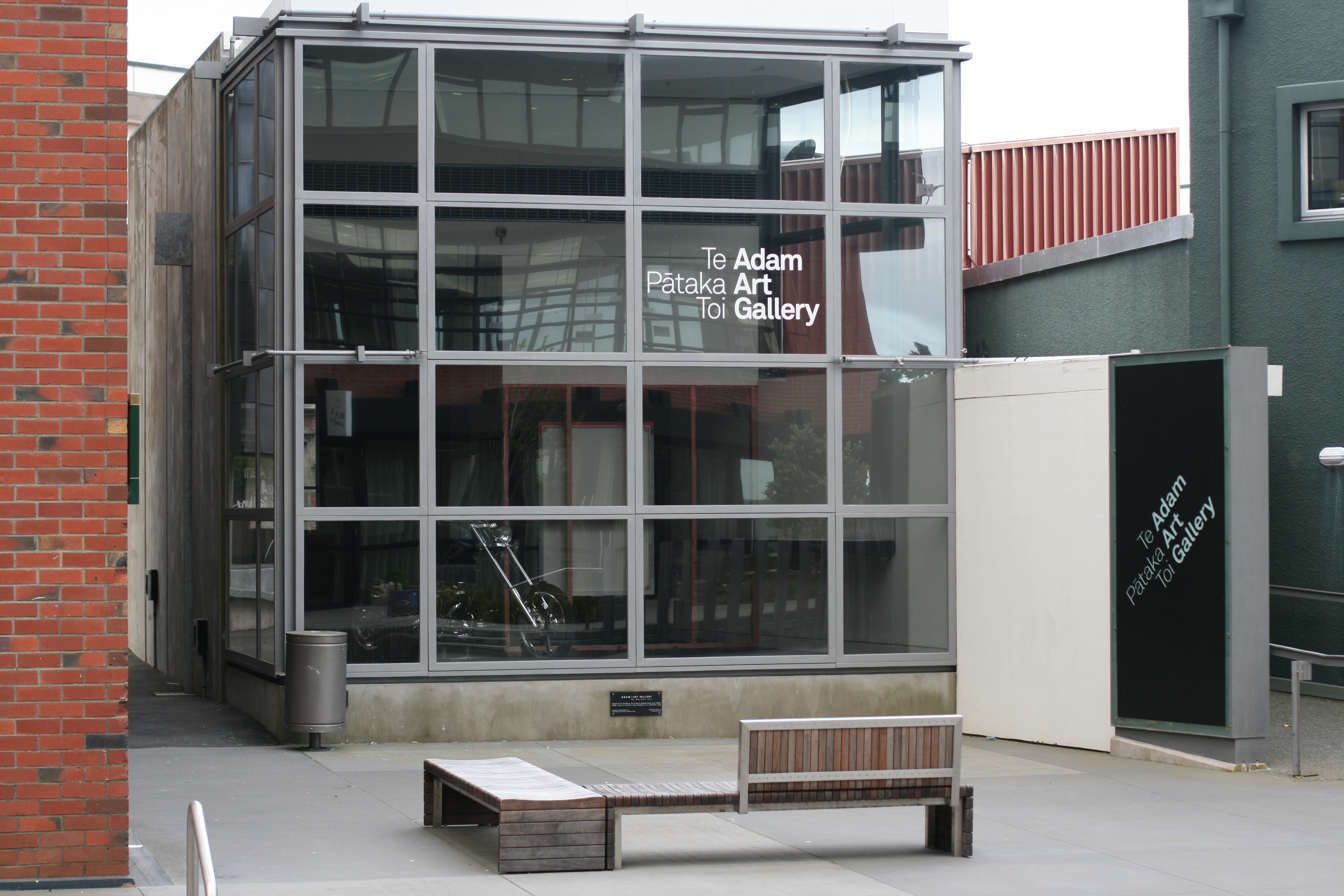
Frontage of the Adam Art Gallery. Its facade is made of glass. The Old Kirk building is located to the left of the gallery, and the Students' Union building to the right.

The Adam Art Gallery (in Māori: Te Pātaka Toi) is a purpose-built arts gallery located in the Kelburn Campus of Victoria University of Wellington in Wellington, New Zealand.

== History ==
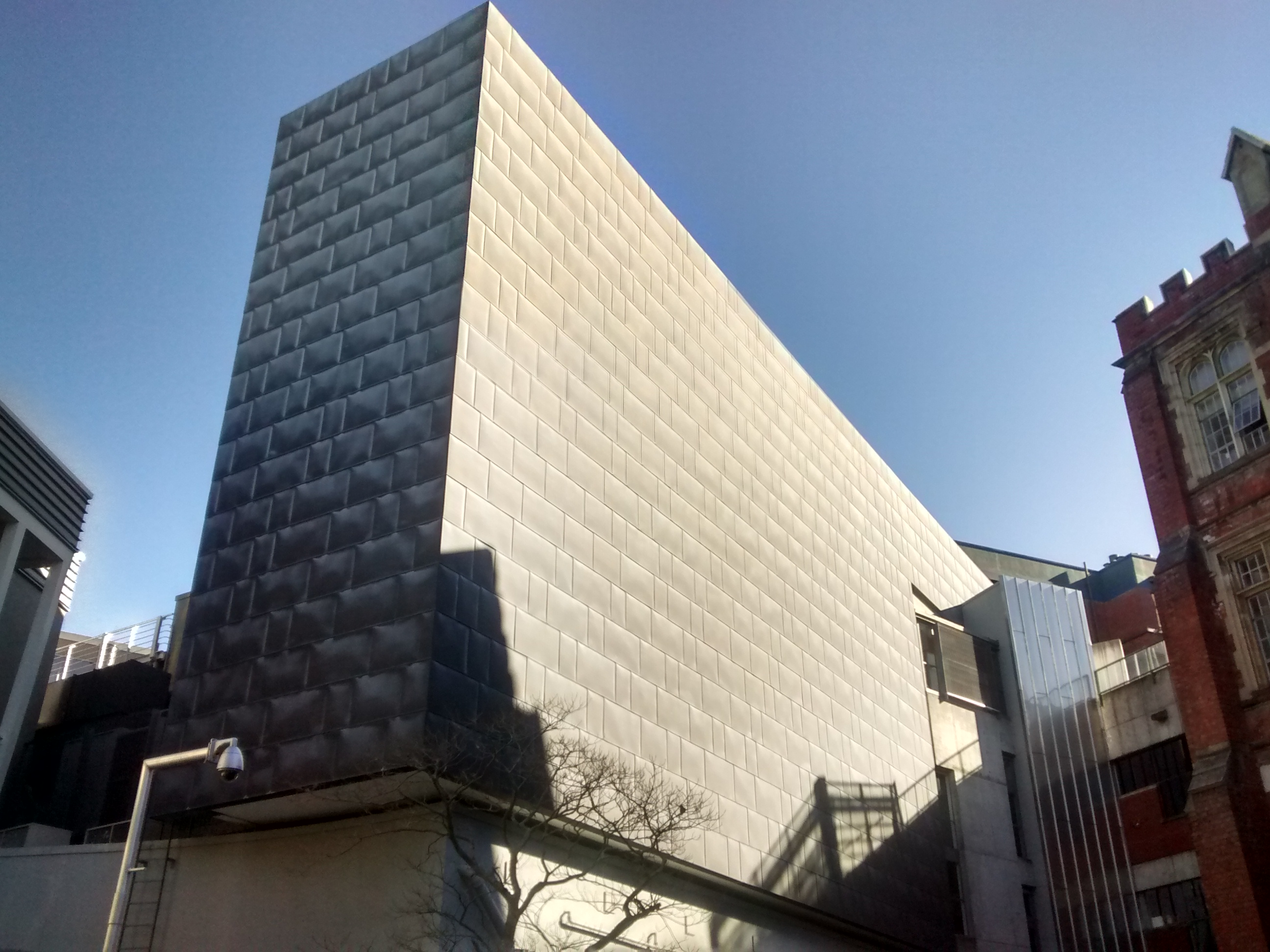
The back of the gallery

On 15 July 1997, Jenny Harper and Tina Barton started the proceedings to establish the gallery.

The building was formally opened 21 September 1999, by Sir Michael Hardie Boys, Governor General of New Zealand.

The gallery's benefactors include Victoria University of Wellington Foundation, as well as Denis and Verna Adam (who the gallery was subsequently named after following their donation of NZ$1 million in 1998.

The gallery was designed by Ian Athfield. It was built between the three university buildings the Old Kirk Building, the Hunter Building and the Student Union Building (on top of the existing "Culliford stair").

The stairs were built in the mid-1960s to link different buildings, but had to be abandoned for safety reasons. The building includes different gallery spaces that hold exhibitions, performances, lectures and talks.

== Exhibition ==
The gallery's first exhibition was Manufacturing Meaning, which included Colin McCahon's painting "Storm Warning". The painting had been controversially sold by Victoria University to fund the Adam's construction.

Selected exhibitions held at the gallery have included solo projects by Joseph Kosuth (USA), Joseph Grigely (USA), Fernanda Gomes (Brazil), Zhang Huan (PRC), Destiny Deacon (Australia), Gunther Uecker (Germany), João Maria Gusmão & Pedro Paiva (Portugal), Brett Graham (NZ), Mark Adams (NZ), Gavin Hipkins (NZ), Darcy Lange (NZ), Vivian Lynn (NZ), Pauline Rhodes (NZ) and Billy Apple (UK/US/NZ).

Peripheral Relations - the influence of Marcel Duchamp on New Zealand art exhibition curated by Marcus Moore.

Selected curated shows at the gallery have include Face to Face: Contemporary Art From Taiwan; Play: Recent Video from Australia and New Zealand; Concrete Horizons: Contemporary Art from China; Breaking Ice: Revisioning Antarctica; 40yearsvideoart.de, and The Subject Now.

The Adam Art Gallery's admission is complimentary.

== Building awards ==
In 1999 the architectural firm Athfield Architects won two awards for the building, the NZIA Resene Branch Architecture Award: Community & Cultural, and the NZIA Resene Colour Architecture Award: Community & Cultural. In 2000 it received a regional award, the NZIA Resene Central Regional Architecture Award: Community & Cultural. In 2025 it won the Enduring Architecture Award at the Wellington Architecture Awards (NZIA).
