= Priscilla Pitts =

New Zealand writer and curator

Priscilla Pitts is a New Zealand writer and art curator.

== Biography ==
Pitts was educated at the University of Auckland, gaining an MA in English and Art History.

In the 1980s, Pitts co-founded the magazine Antic, which focused on literature and visual arts. She was also a frequent contributor to the journal Art New Zealand.

From 1993 to 1998, Pitts was director of the Govett-Brewster Art Gallery in New Plymouth. She then moved to Dunedin and from 1998 to 2007 she was director of the Dunedin Public Art Gallery and Otago Settlers Museum. Between 2007 and 2014, Pitts had a managerial role at the New Zealand Historic Places Trust. Since that time she has worked as a freelance writer and curator, working from Lower Hutt.

In 2017 she co-wrote a book on the history of the Frances Hodgkins Fellowship.

=== Publications ===
- Contemporary New Zealand Sculpture (1998), David Bateman
- Undreamed of…50 Years of the Frances Hodgkins Fellowship (2017, with Andrea Hotere), Otago University Press
