= Dunedin Public Art Gallery =

Art gallery in Dunedin New Zealand

Coordinates: 45.87451°S 170.50281°E

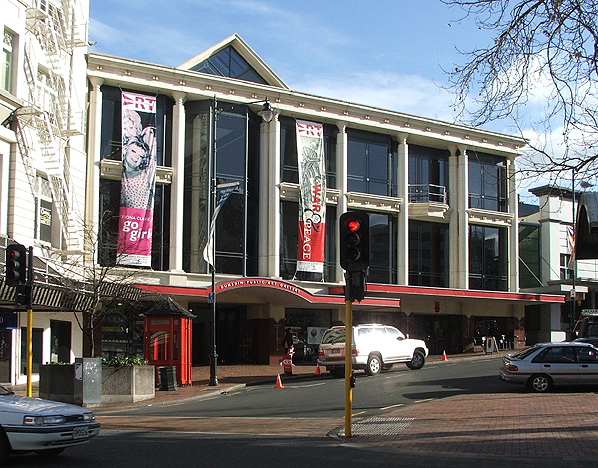
Dunedin Public Art Gallery

The Dunedin Public Art Gallery holds the main public art collection of the city of Dunedin, New Zealand. Located in The Octagon in the heart of the city, it is close to the city's public library, Dunedin Town Hall, and other facilities such as the Regent Theatre.

== History ==
The gallery was founded by W. M. Hodgkins in 1884 and was the first public art gallery in New Zealand. It originally occupied what is now the maritime gallery in the Otago Museum, was re-located to the Municipal Chambers in the Octagon from 1888–90, and then to an annex to the Otago Museum. It moved to a new purpose-designed building in Queen's Gardens in 1907, to which a structure housing the Otago Settlers Museum was added the following year. In 1927 it was moved to a building constructed for the 1925–26 New Zealand and South Seas International Exhibition in Logan Park, Dunedin North designed by Edmund Anscombe. The building was bought and donated to the city by Sir Percy and Lady Sargood, as a memorial to their son who was killed at Gallipoli. The gallery was relocated to its present site, the refitted D.I.C. building, in 1996.

In its long existence the gallery has played host to numerous overseas exhibitions, including Masterpieces of the Guggenheim a 1990s modern art show, and the touring Tate Gallery exhibition The Pre-Raphaelite Dream, more recently.

== Collection ==
The gallery has a strong collection of historic and contemporary works, by New Zealand and overseas artists. It has one of the most numerous collections of works by Frances Hodgkins, who was born in the city. It has the most extensive collection of Old Master paintings in New Zealand and the most significant holdings of paintings by post-1800 overseas artists.

The collections include works by Jacopo del Casentino (also known as Landini), Zanobi Machiavelli, Benvenuto Tisi (called Garofalo), Ridolfo Ghirlandaio, Carlo Maratta, Luca Giordano, Salvator Rosa, Claude Lorrain, Hans Rottenhammer, Pieter de Grebber, Marcus Gheeraerts the Younger, William Dobson, Cornelis Janssens van Ceulen (Cornelius Johnson), Jan van Goyen, Allan Ramsay, Thomas Gainsborough, Joshua Reynolds, George Romney, Henry Raeburn, John Hoppner and William Turner; John Constable, Théodore Rousseau, Giovanni Fattori, Silvestro Lega, James Tissot, Johan Jongkind, Claude Monet, Edward Burne-Jones, George Frederic Watts, Sir Stanley Spencer, Walter Sickert, Laurence Lowry and André Derain.

The gallery's British watercolours, the gift of F.H.D. Smythe, include over 1300 works and the group is outstanding in New Zealand. The gallery has significant holdings of overseas Old Master and modern prints and drawings, including a notable collection of Japanese woodblock prints. Its New Zealand holdings are distinguished by such works as George O'Brien's Lawyer's Head from Forbury Head, Sunrise, Petrus Van der Velden's A Waterfall in the Otira Gorge, G.P. Nerli's Portrait of a Girl, C.F. Goldie's All 'e Same t'e Pakeha, Alfred Henry O'Keeffe's The Defence Minister's Telegram, Rita Angus's 1937 Self-Portrait, Colin McCahon's The 5 Wounds of Christ and Ralph Hotere's Rosemary.

Unlike New Zealand's other major public galleries the Dunedin Public Art Gallery branched out into the decorative arts in the 1920s, developing on the model of the Victoria and Albert Museum in London, or the American 'Art Museums'. It thus has extensive and, in New Zealand, unparalleled holdings of ceramics, glassware, metalwork, furniture and textiles, mostly of overseas origin. The William De Morgan Dragon Charger is an example.

Its current director is Cam McCracken.

== Directors ==
1958 - 1964 Annette Pearse

1965 - 1971 Charlton Edgar

1971 - 1980 Les Lloyd

1980 – 1989 Frank Dickinson

1990 – 1993 Cheryll Sotheran

1994 - 1997 John McCormack

1998 - 2007 Priscilla Pitts

2008 - 2012 Elizabeth Caldwell

2012 - Cam McCracken

== Gallery ==
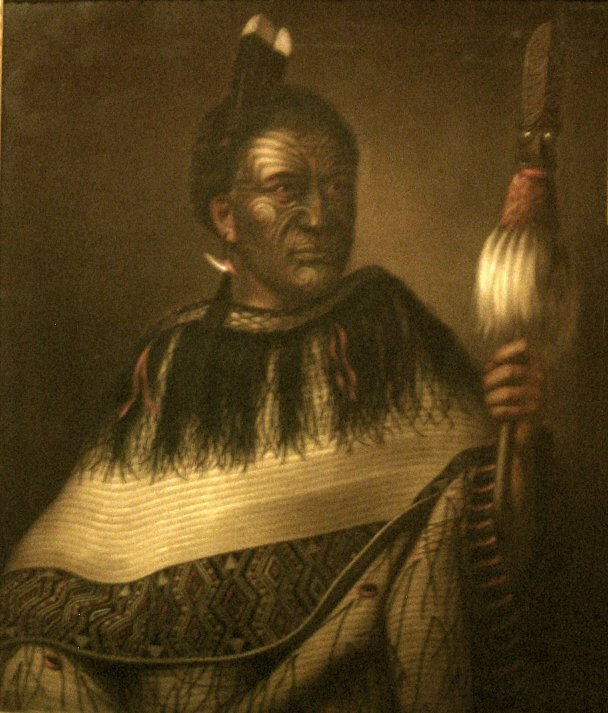
Chief Ngairo Rakaihikuroa in Wairarapa, New Zealand by Gottfried Lindauer

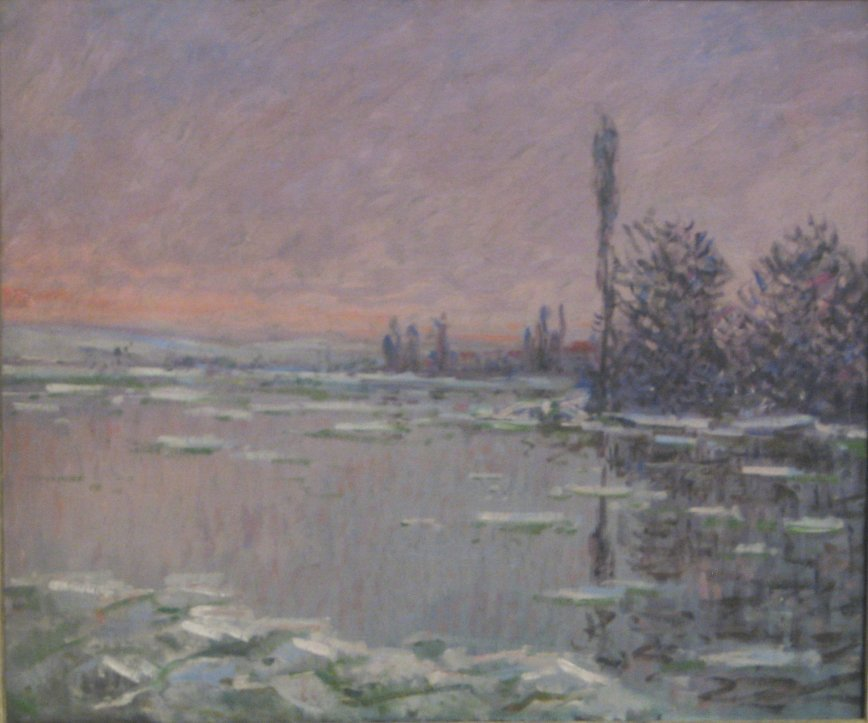
La Débâcle by Claude Monet

== See also ==
- Hocken Collections
- Otago Museum
- Otago Settlers Museum
