= Christchurch Art Gallery =

Art gallery in Christchurch, New Zealand

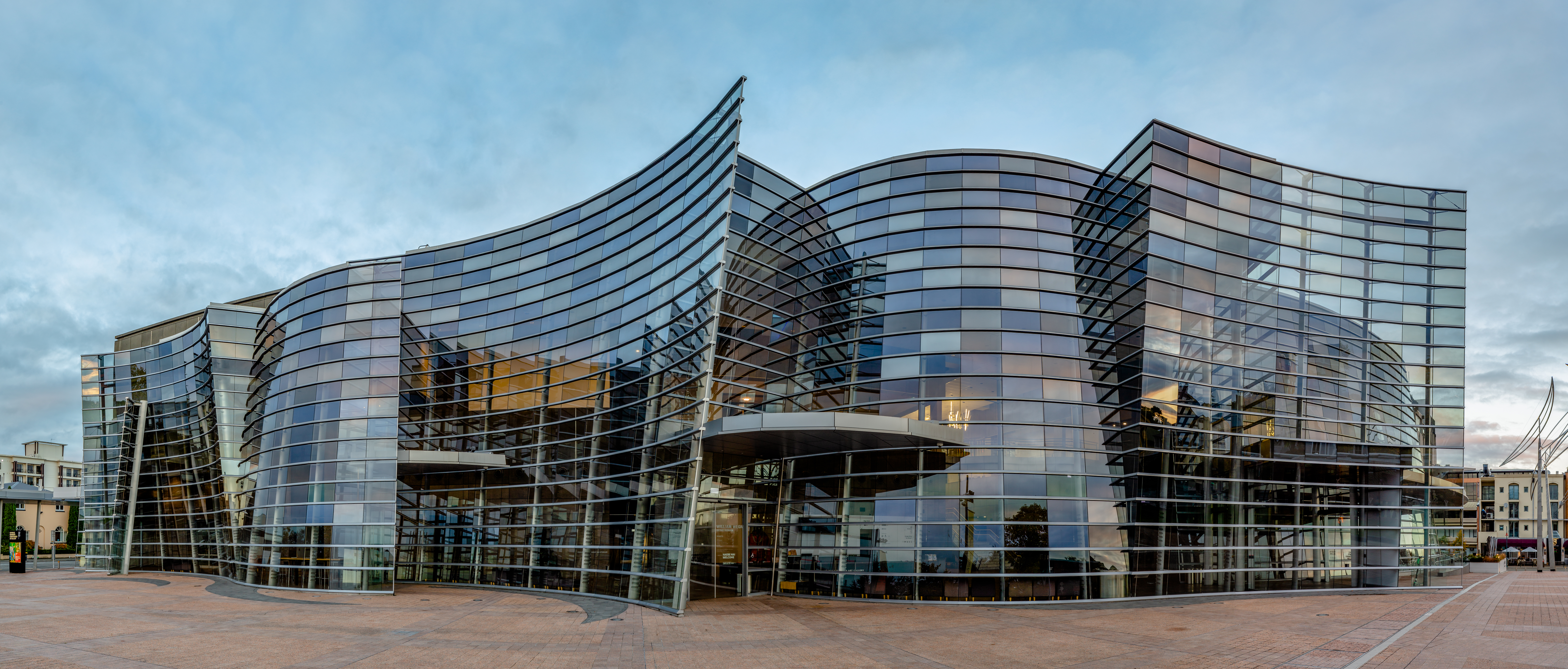
- Gallery exterior
- Interactive map of the Christchurch Art Gallery area

General information
- Coordinates: 43°31′50″S 172°37′52″E
- Inaugurated: 10 May 2003
- Owner: Christchurch City Council

Design and construction
- Architecture firm: Buchan Group

The Christchurch Art Gallery (Māori: Te Puna o Waiwhetū) is the public art gallery of the city of Christchurch, New Zealand. It has its own substantial art collection and also presents a programme of New Zealand and international exhibitions. It is funded by Christchurch City Council. The gallery opened on 10 May 2003, replacing the city's previous public art gallery, the Robert McDougall Art Gallery, which had opened in 1932.

== History ==
The previous public art gallery, the Robert McDougall Art Gallery, opened on 16 June 1932 and closed on 16 June 2002. It was located in the Christchurch Botanic Gardens, adjacent to Canterbury Museum, where the building still stands unused, as of 2019.

Christchurch City Council committed funds to buying land for a new gallery in 1995 and purchased the Christchurch Art Gallery site in 1996. A competition to design the new gallery was launched in 1998.

In 2022, writer, researcher and lecturer with Tahitian heritage, Karen Stevenson, gifted 77 works by 32 artists from her private collection to Christchurch Art Gallery. Artists includes Fatu Feu'u, Mahiriki Tangaroa, Michel Tuffery and Niki Hastings-McFall. Majority of the artworks are Pacific art.

== The building ==
The gallery's building was designed by the Buchan Group. The gallery's forecourt has a large sculpture, Reason for Voyaging, which was the result of a collaboration between the sculptor Graham Bennett and the architect David Cole.

The building was used as Civil Defence headquarters for Christchurch following the 2010 Canterbury earthquake, and again after the February 2011 Christchurch earthquake. The gallery was designed to deal with seismic events. The gallery's foundation, a concrete raft slab that sits on the surface of the ground, evenly distributes earthquake forces. However, it sustained some damage during the earthquake. The gallery building was used as a Civil Defence headquarters for seven months after the 2011 Christchurch earthquake, and did not reopen until 19 December 2015 due to the need for extensive refurbishments and improvements.

== Directors ==
Although the Robert McDougall Art Gallery opened in 1932, the first paid director, William Baverstock, was appointed in 1960 (he had previously served as honorary curator from 1949).

- 1960–1969: William Baverstock (1893–1975)
- 1969–1979: Brian Muir (1943–1989)
- 1979–1981: T. L. Rodney Wilson (1945–2013)
- 1981–1995: John Coley
- 1995–2006: Tony Preston
- 2006–2018: Jenny Harper (b. 1950)
- 2018–present: Blair Jackson

== Gallery ==
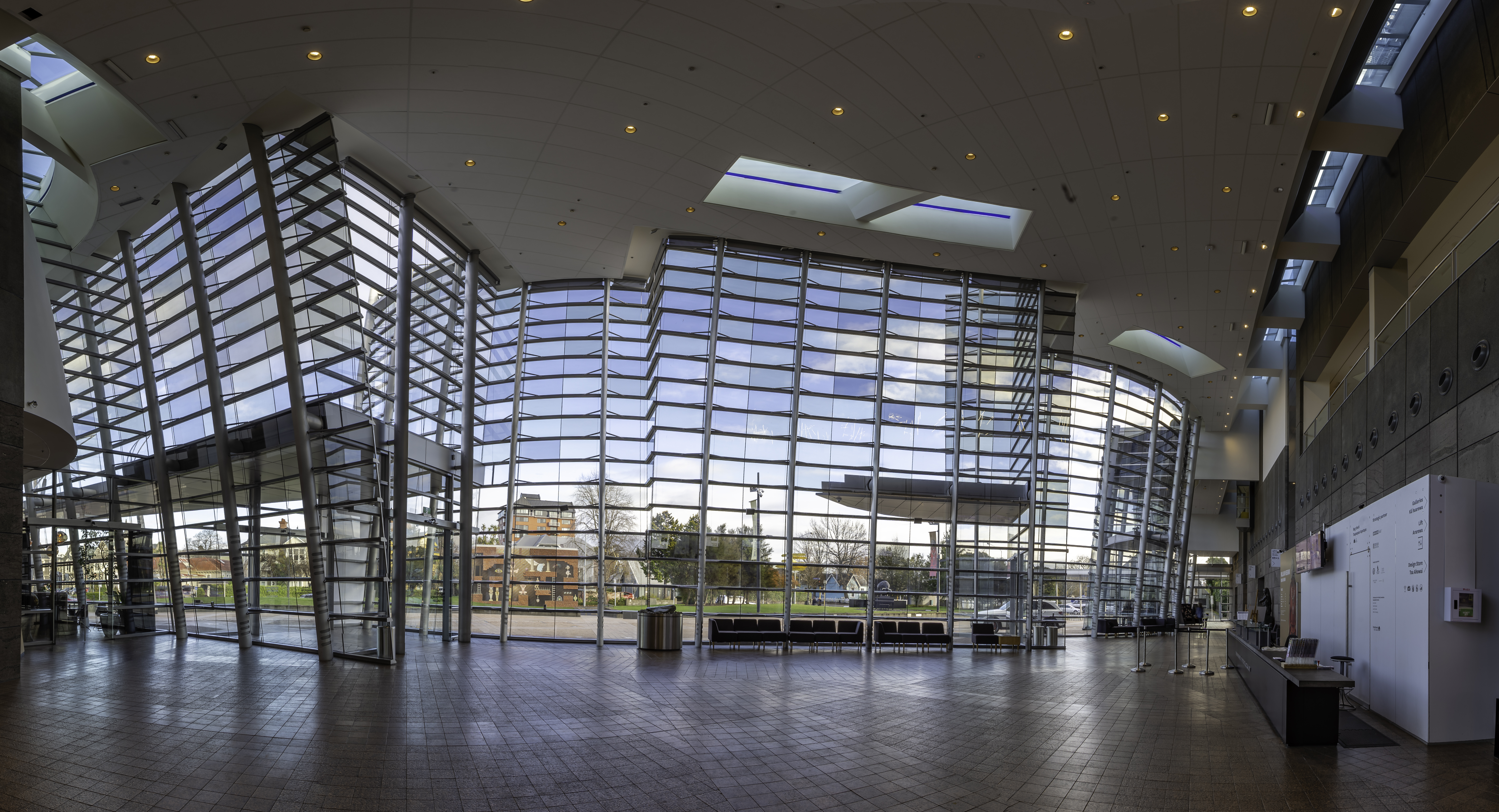
Interior of Christchurch Art Gallery

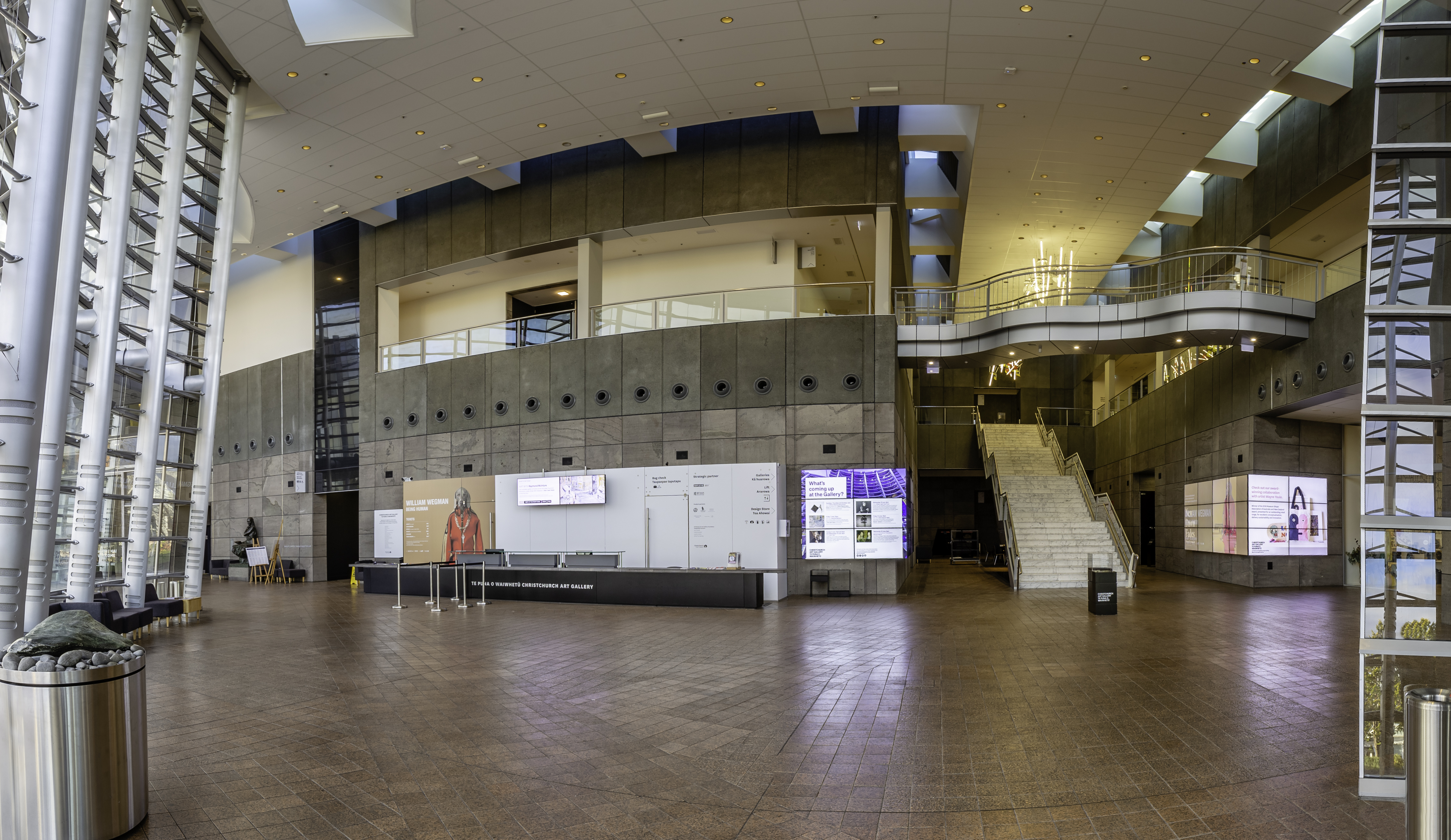
Gallery's foyer

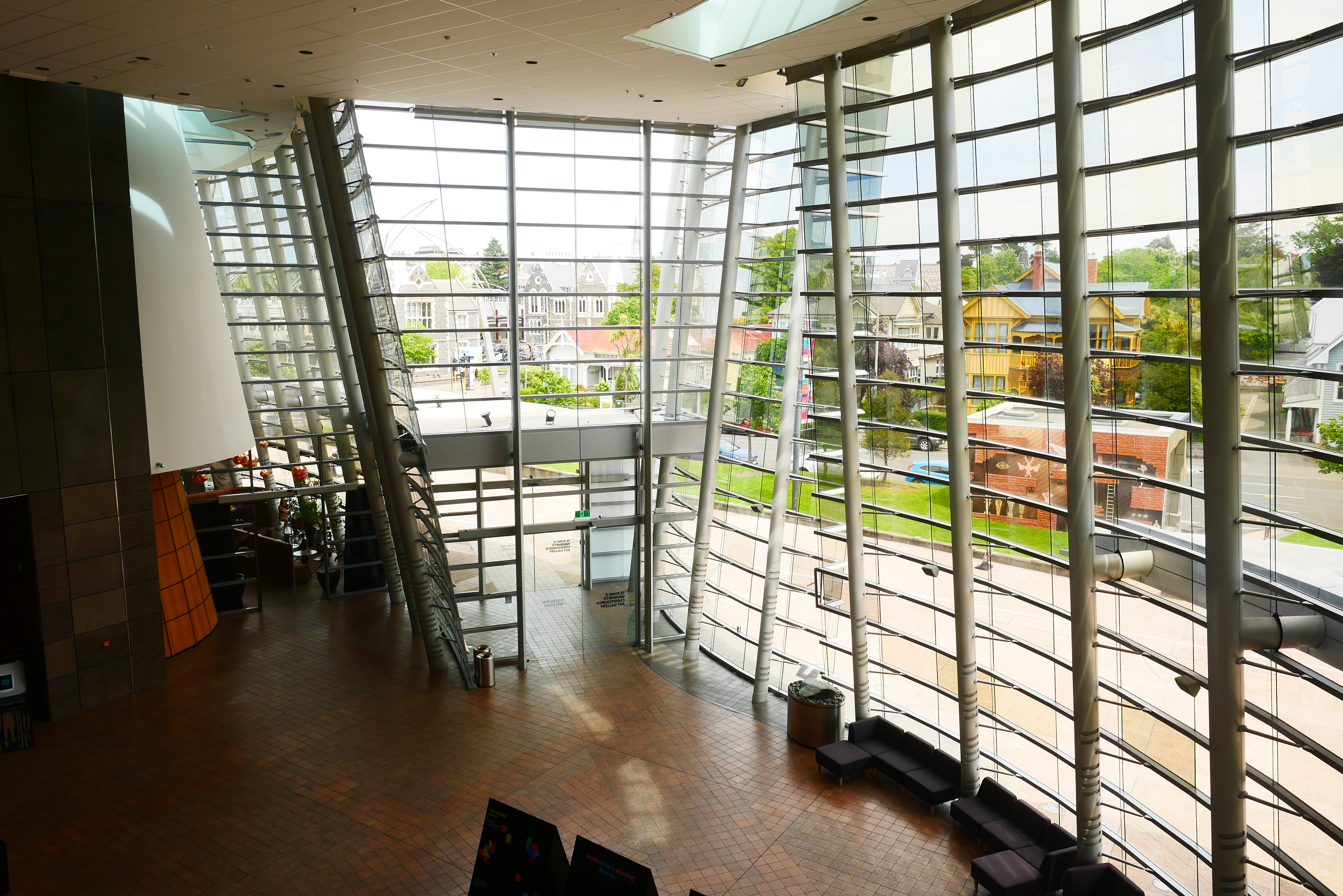
View of foyer from upstairs

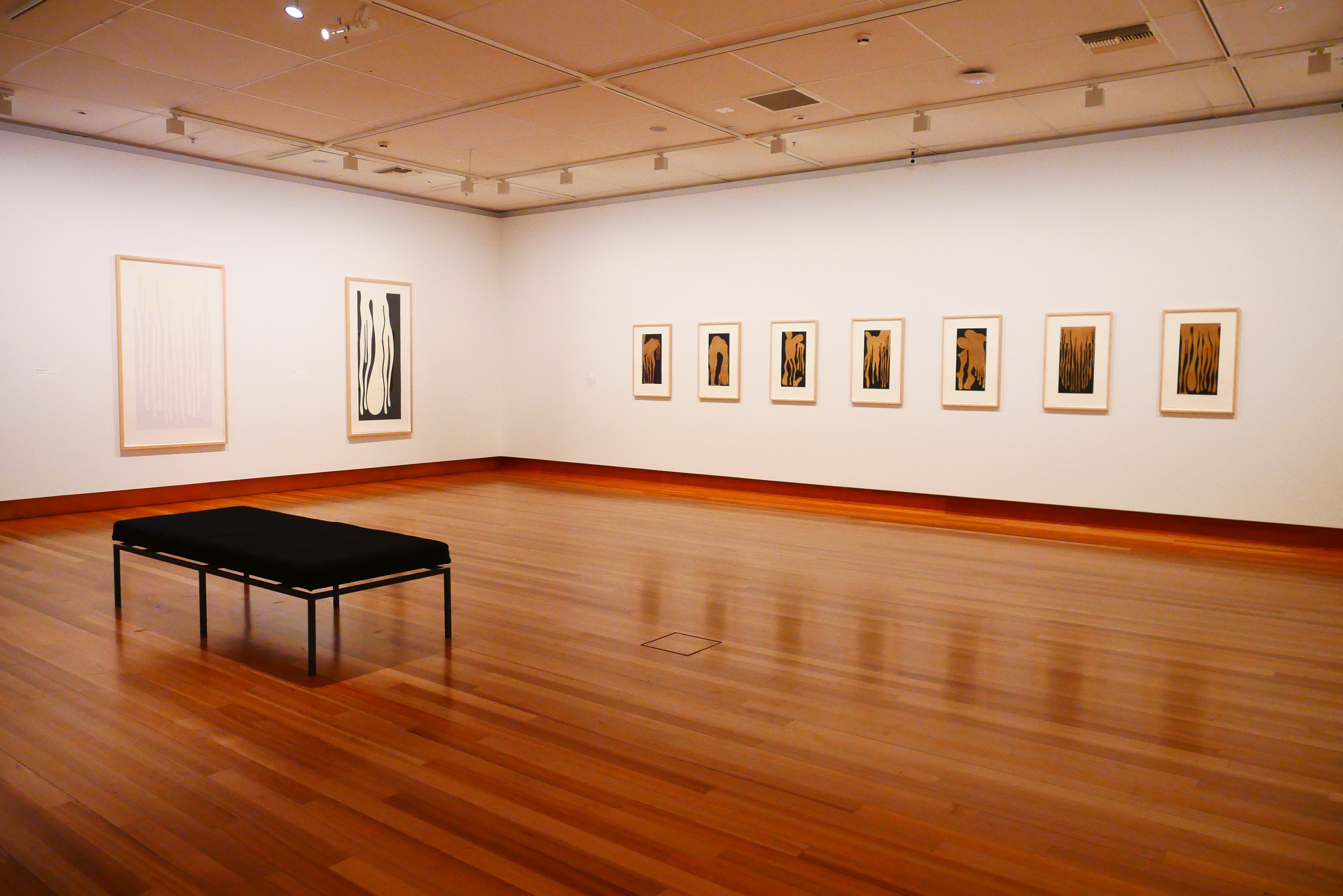
Gallery space

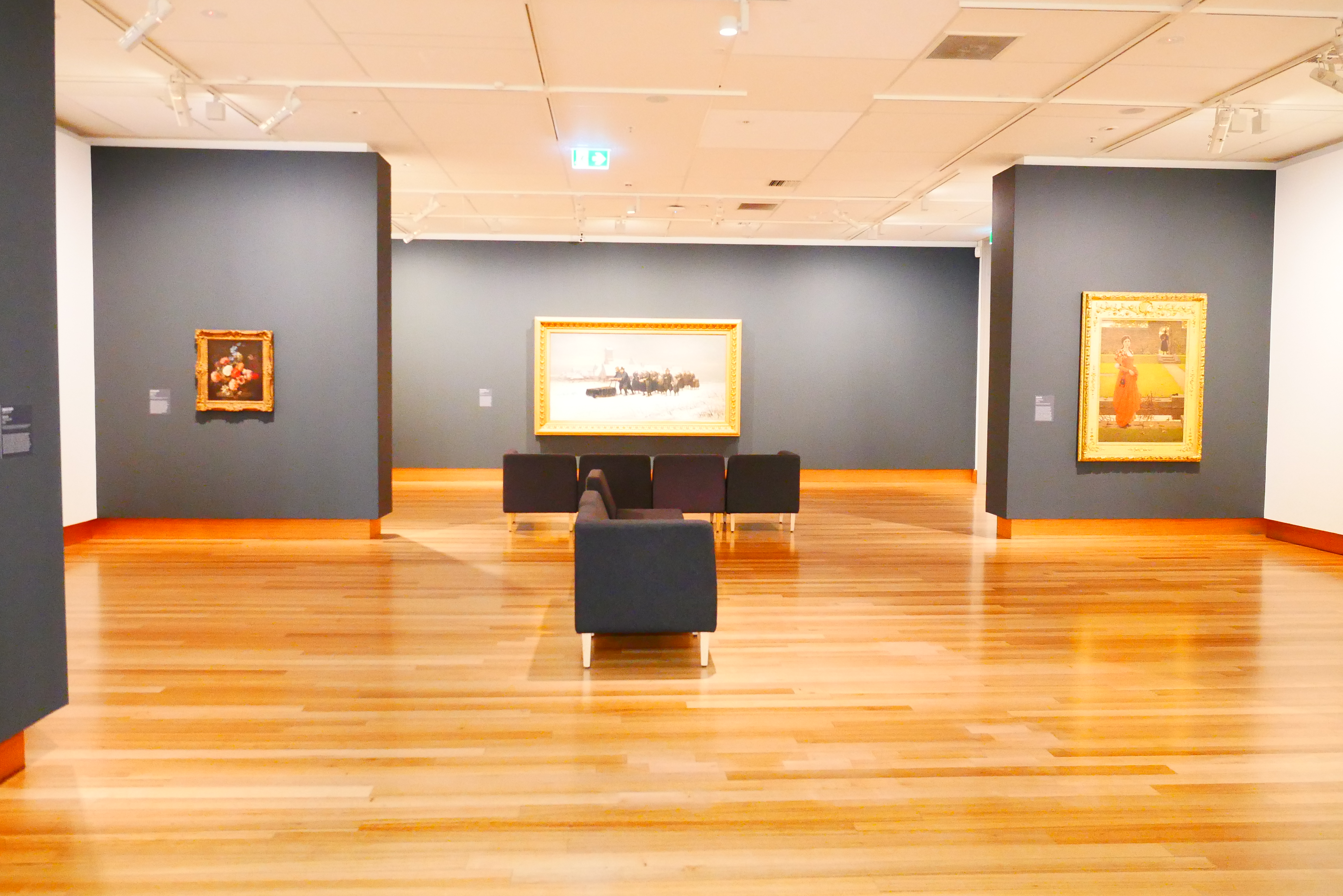
Gallery space

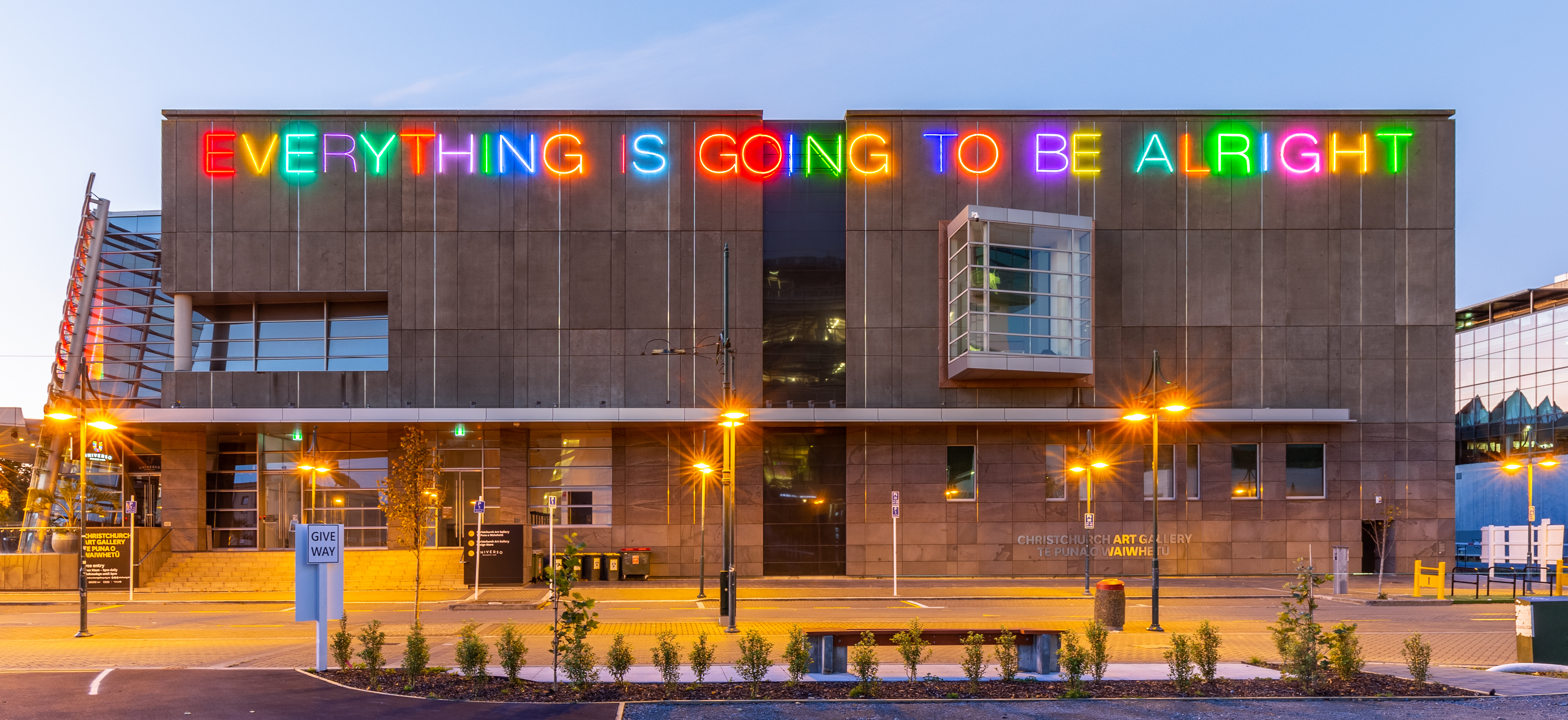
Side view of gallery with Martin Creed's Everything Is Going To Be Alright artwork, 2020

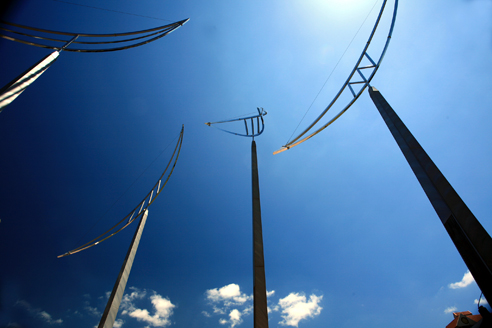
Reasons for voyaging, a sculpture on the gallery's forecourt

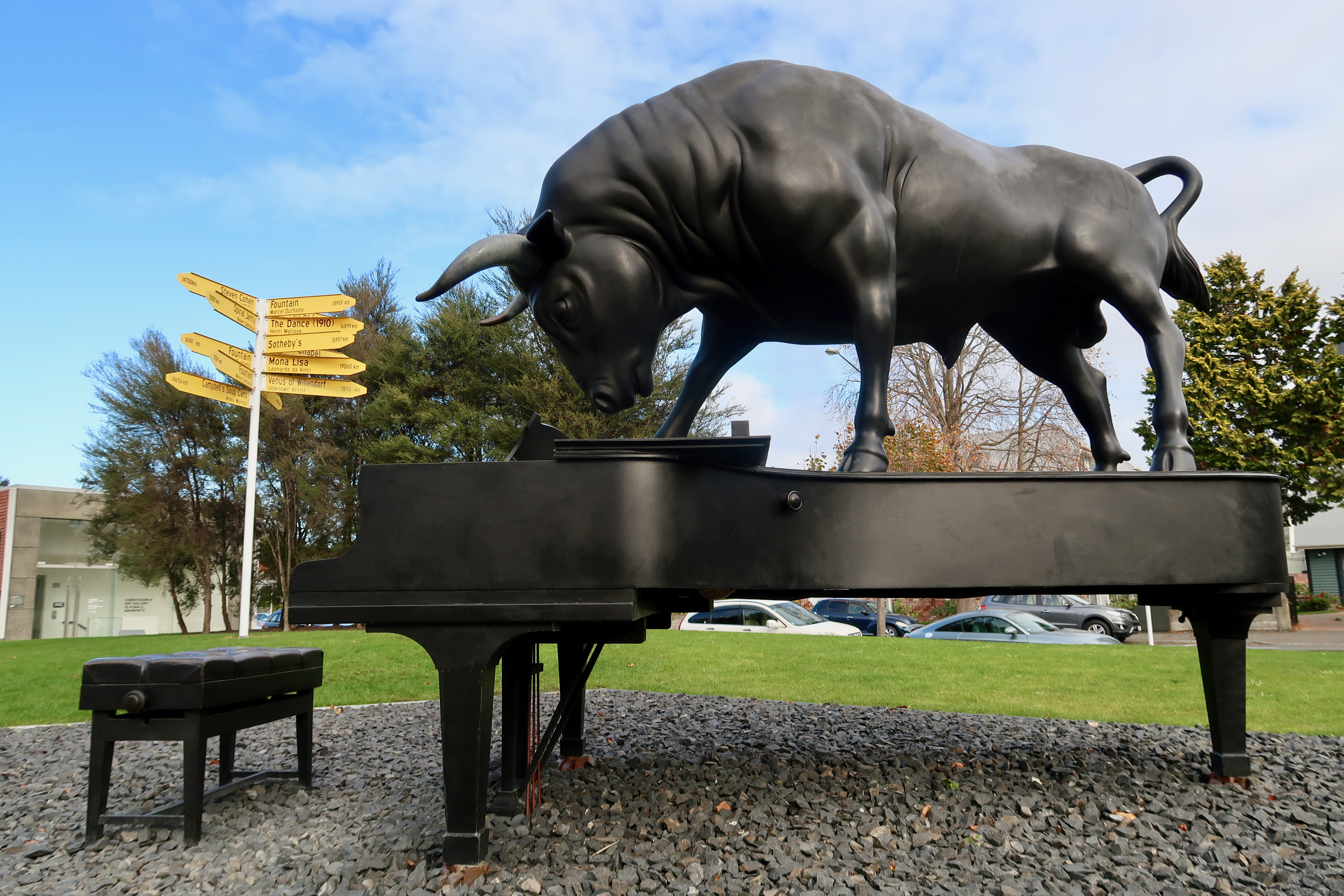
Michael Parekōwhai's 2011 sculpture Chapman's Homer
