= Ron Jones (gynaecologist) =

New Zealand obstetrician and gynaecologist (1939–2025)

Ron Jones CNZM
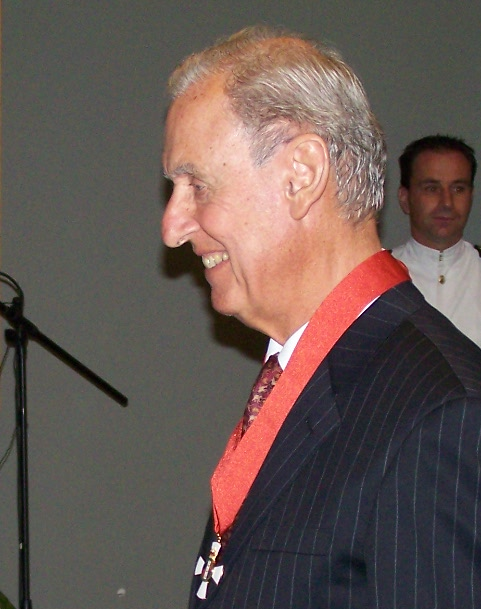
- Jones in 2009
- Born: Ronald William Jones; 3 October 1939; Christchurch, New Zealand
- Died: 31 March 2025 (aged 85); Auckland, New Zealand
- Education: University of Otago
- Occupations: Obstetrician and gynaecologist
- Employers: National Women's Hospital; University of Auckland
- Known for: Whistleblower in the "unfortunate experiment"
- Spouse: Barbara Ann Hampton (died 1990)
- Children: 4

Ronald William Jones CNZM (3 October 1939 – 31 March 2025) was a New Zealand obstetrician and gynaecologist. He was a professor at the University of Auckland, and was responsible in the 1980s for exposing the unethical treatment of women with carcinoma in situ of the cervix (now called CIN3 or cervical intrepithelial neoplasia) at National Women's Hospital in Auckland.

== Early life and family ==
Jones was born in the Christchurch suburb of Riccarton on 3 October 1939, the son of Ivy Maude Jones (née House) and Sidney Edwin Jones, and grew up in Christchurch. From 1951 to 1957, he was educated at St Andrew's College, where he was a prefect in his final year, and commenced his medical degree in 1960 at the University of Otago.

In December 1963, Jones' engagement to Barbara Ann Hampton was announced. The couple subsequently married and had four children.

== Career ==
After graduating MB ChB from Otago, Jones trained in surgery, obstetrics and gynaecology in England, where he lectured at the University of Southampton. In 1973, he returned to Auckland, becoming a junior obstetrician and gynaecologist at National Women's Hospital (NWH). There he became concerned about the management of women with carcinoma in situ (CIS) of the cervix by Associate Professor Herb Green who believed that CIS was a benign condition not requiring treatment. Jones adhered to the accepted medical view that CIS was pre-cancerous and should be treated. Jones and his colleagues pathologist Dr Jock McLean and specialist Dr Bill McIndoe followed up the data on the women under Green's care. In 1984 they published a paper entitled The invasive potential of carcinoma in situ of the cervix on the women's outcomes finding patients who had developed invasive cervical cancer and in some cases died. The paper was ignored by the medical fraternity until it was picked up by Sandra Coney and Phillida Bunkle who published an article in Metro magazine in 1987 bringing the issue of Green's 'experiment' to public attention. This resulted in a committee of inquiry, known as the Cartwright Inquiry, in 1987 into the practices at NWH led by Silvia Cartwright which found that patients had not given their consent and that the failure to treat them was unethical.

The 1984 paper and inquiry caused divisions in the medical establishment with Jones finding himself ostracised by some of his colleagues who supported Green's management of the women. The arguments for and against continued for many years with Linda Bryder publishing a book in 2009 supporting the view that there was no 'experiment' and that the Cartwright Inquiry's conclusions were erroneous. Jones and colleagues, including epidemiologists David Skegg and Charlotte Paul, analysed about 45 years of patient records and published two papers showing that CIS was a precursor for cancer and that limiting treatment resulted in invasive cancer.

In 2009, Jones earned the degree of Doctor of Medicine from the University of Otago; his thesis was titled Aspects of the natural history of lower genital tract intraepithelial neoplasia.

Jones published his own account Doctors in Denial in 2017 detailing the effect on his career of being a medical whistle-blower in order to expose unethical practices and ensure women received the necessary treatment. At the book's launch the Royal Australian and New Zealand College of Obstetricians and Gynaecologists made the first public apology to all the women who had been part of Green's study. Royalties from Doctors in Denial were donated to research into gynaecological cancer and the care of patients.

Jones was a clinical professor at the University of Auckland. He held positions on international organisations as president of the International Society for the Study of Vulvo-Vaginal Disease and as chairman of the International Federation of Cervical Pathology and Colposcopy.

In 2015, Jones delivered a lecture on Dr Doris Gordon to mark the formation of a new Doris Gordon Memorial Trust by the Royal Australian and New Zealand College of Obstetricians and Gynaecologists and National Council of Women.

== Later life and death ==
Jones' wife, Barbara, died of breast cancer in 1990. He died in Auckland on 31 March 2025, at the age of 85.

== Honours and awards ==
Jones was appointed a Companion of the New Zealand Order of Merit in the 2009 New Year Honours, for services to women's health. In 2022, the American Association for the Advancement of Science (AAAS) awarded Jones a Scientific Freedom and Responsibility Award "for his work defending patients' rights and scientific integrity and for maintaining the spotlight on these principles". Jones is the only New Zealander to have received this award.

Jones was a fellow of the Royal College of Surgeons of Edinburgh, the Royal College of Obstetricians and Gynaecologists, and the Royal Australian and New Zealand College of Obstetricians and Gynaecologists.
