= Cartwright Inquiry =

Commission of inquiry into medical malpractice in New Zealand

The Cartwright Inquiry was a committee of inquiry held in New Zealand from 1987 to 1988 that was commissioned by the Minister of Health, Michael Bassett, to investigate whether, as alleged in an article in Metro magazine, there had been a failure to treat patients adequately with cervical carcinoma in situ (CIS) at National Women’s Hospital (NWH) by Herbert Green, a specialist obstetrician and gynaecologist and associate professor at the Postgraduate School of Obstetrics and Gynaecology, University of Auckland. The inquiry was headed by District Court Judge Silvia Cartwright, later High Court Justice, Dame and Governor-General of New Zealand. The Report of the Cervical Cancer Inquiry was released on 5 August 1988.

== Background ==
A 1984 medical paper published in Obstetrics and Gynecology by colposcopist Bill McIndoe, pathologist Jock McLean and gynaecologist Ron Jones, who were all employed at NWH and colleagues of Green, as well as statistician Peter Mullins, described an audit of 948 women who had been diagnosed with cervical carcinoma in situ (CIS) at New Zealand's National Women's Hospital from 1955 to 1976. The authors retrospectively divided the women with CIS into two groups: those with normal cytology follow-up at two years after initial management (817) and those who continued to have abnormal cytology (positive smears) (131). Among those who continued to have abnormal cytology, a much higher proportion developed invasive cervical or vaginal vault cancer (22% versus 1.5% over five to 28 years). The authors concluded that CIS of the cervix had significant invasive potential.

Using that paper, the medical experience of one of Green's patients as a case study (under the pseudonym 'Ruth') and interviews with staff, a freelance journalist, Sandra Coney, and an academic, Phillida Bunkle, published an exposé, 'An "unfortunate experiment" at National Women’s Hospital', in Metro Magazine in June 1987. The article alleged that Green was carrying out research on his patients without their knowledge or consent and that since the mid-1960s, he had been withholding conventional treatment from some patients with CIS. Coney and Bunkle took the title of their article from a 1986 letter in the New Zealand Medical Journal by Professor David Skegg, a University of Otago cancer epidemiologist and expert in population screening in which he referred to "the unfortunate experiment at National Women's Hospital" in his reply to Green about the study. The authors claimed that no one could give them an assurance that the study had been stopped. Publication led to such enormous public outrage and concern that within ten days, the Minister of Health, Michael Bassett, established an inquiry.

== Green's study ==
In June 1966, Green received permission from the NWH's Senior Medical Staff (SMS) and the Hospital Medical Committee (HMC) to undertake a study of following women with CIS (now, together with severe dysplasia, termed Cervical Intraepithelial Neoplasia 3, CIN3) without treatment. Green's proposal stated that all patients with a diagnosis of CIS under the age of 35, with positive smears and no colposcopic evidence of invasive cancer and without a ring or cone biopsy, would be followed. The Minutes recorded that Green stated that 'his aim was to attempt to prove that carcinoma-in-situ is not a pre-malignant disease'. He also said that if at any stage concern was felt for the safety of a patient, a cone biopsy would be performed.

Green published the evolving results of his study in the natural history of CIS in a series of papers from 1966 to 1975. In 1969, he wrote about his methods more clearly than in his proposal: "In 1965 [sic] the SMS of NWH initiated a project under the supervision of the author, for patients up to 35 years of age whose only abnormal finding was positive cervical cytology.... a histological diagnosis was to be established by punch biopsy of the most colposcopically significant area. Provided the biopsy did not remove the entire significant area, or reveal invasive carcinoma, there was to be no further treatment. As of the end of 1967, 33 such patients were studied." Green reported that none of the patients had been subsequently diagnosed with invasive cancer, as of June 1968.

In 1970, Green published further results and described his study: "The only way to settle finally the problem of what happens to in situ cancer is to follow indefinitely patients with diagnosed but untreated lesions. This is being attempted." Again, he recorded no patients developing invasive cancer. A further paper from 1970 provided mathematical estimates of the invasive potential of CIS by using "follow-up observations on 75 patients who were untreated or incompletely treated". No patients were reported to have developed invasive cancer.

In the last paper, in 1974, Green again described his study: "This series of 750 cases of in situ cervical cancer, and the following of 96 of them with positive cytology for at least two years, represents the nearest approach yet to the classical method of deciding such an issue as the change of one disease state to another – the randomised controlled trial. It has not been randomised and it is not well controlled, but it has at least been prospective." This time, Green reported that 10 cases had apparently progressed to invasion but that only 2 had "no clinical or histologic doubt." [Only one of the patients was under age 35.] He concluded that the present series "offers little proof of the progression hypothesis."

Green published nothing else. A later and separate re-evaluation of the invasive potential of CIS, based on a review of NWH patients' files, was published by McIndoe et al, with very different findings.

== Inquiry ==
District Court Judge Silvia Cartwright was appointed by warrant dated 10 June 1987 as a Committee of Inquiry to inquire into the treatment of cervical cancer at the National Women's Hospital and other matters.

=== Terms of reference ===
The terms of reference for the inquiry were to investigate (as alleged in the Metro article):

1. Whether there was a failure adequately to treat cervical carcinoma in situ at the NWH, and if so, the reasons for that failure and the period for which that failure existed;
2. Whether a research programme into the natural history of CIS of the genital tract was conducted at NWH and, if so:
  1. Whether it was approved before being instituted or while it was underway;
  2. Whether patients were aware at any stage that they were participants in a research programme;
  3. Whether any expressions of concern about the programme were considered and investigated at the time and if so, by whom.
3. Whether there was a need to contact women involved with a view to providing further advice or treatment to them;
4. Whether the National Women's Hospital's procedures for approval of research and/or treatment and its surveillance were adequate, in particular whether they ensure that the rights of patients are protected;
5. What steps, if any, need to be taken to improve the protection of patients in respect of whom research and/or treatment is conducted;
6. Whether the patients at the National Women's Hospital were properly informed of the treatment and options available to them, and, if not, the steps needed to see that they are;
7. The training given to medical students and medical practitioners regarding the proper detection and treatment of cervical cancer and pre-cancerous conditions of the genital tract, and whether steps should be taken to improve this training or to inform previous trainees;
8. To inquire into the relationship between the academic and clinical units at the Hospital
9. Any other matter which is relevant.

=== Procedure of the inquiry ===
The first preliminary hearing was held on 18 June 1987. Three medical advisers were appointed to assist and advise Judge Cartwright, Professor E V MacKay, Professor of Obstetrics and Gynaecology at the University of Queensland, Dr Charlotte Paul, Epidemiologist, University of Otago Medical School and Dr Linda Holloway, Pathologist, University of Otago Wellington School of Medicine. Counsel assisting the inquiry were Lowell Goddard QC and Philippa Cunningham.

Public hearings commenced on 3 August 1987 and ran for seven months. Evidence was heard from 59 witnesses, including from medical experts brought from around New Zealand, as well as from Australia, United States, Japan, UK, and Norway. Twelve patients or former patients, including ‘Ruth’, and two relatives of patients gave evidence in the absence of the public and the media. Judge Cartwright heard evidence privately from a further 70 patients. The medical advisers carried out a review and analysis of patient files. Overall 1200 patient files were reviewed.

=== Report findings in respect of Green's study ===
In respect of Term of Reference One (TR1), the Report defined ‘adequate treatment’ of CIS since the 1950s as being that based on generally accepted treatment [at NWH this was cone biopsy] together with evidence of eradication of the disease, and concluded that, by that standard, there had been a failure to adequately treat a number of women with CIS at NWH, For a minority of women, their management resulted in persisting disease, the development of invasive cancer, and in some cases, death. The reasons for the failure were the implementation of the ‘1966 trial’, failure to recognise the dangers for patients, failure to evaluate the risks to patients if Green’s hypothesis was wrong, failure to note the rising incidence of invasive cancer, to stop the trial and treat the patients as soon as cogent evidence of risk began to emerge, and failure on behalf of some colleagues and the NWH administration to impinge on Green’s clinical freedom and act decisively to stop the trial in the interests of patient safety.

In respect of TR2, the Report found that the 1966 trial was a research study into the natural history of CIS. The 1966 trial was approved by the NWH Hospital Medical Committee on 20 June 1966.The great majority of patients did not know, except intuitively, that they were participants in the trial. ‘Had patients been informed of their inclusion in the trial, informed of the types of treatment available to them, informed of the risks of procedures that were not conventional, definitive treatment for CIS, and given the opportunity to decide whether or not to be part of the trial, then the trial could not be so severely criticised’.

Green's published work showed evidence of scientific fraud, according to Judge Cartwright. "An analysis of Dr Green's papers point to misinterpretation or misunderstanding of some data on his part, and on occasions, manipulation of his own data." "The inference to be drawn from Dr Green’s proposal and published papers is that CIS will progress to invasive cancer in only a very small proportion of cases if at all. This inference is incorrect and reliance on it has been dangerous to patients."

The New Zealand Medical Council accepted that the 1978 protocols laid down by the Hospital Medical Committee spelled the end of the 'trial'. The International Federation of Gynecology and Obstetrics published statistics from the late 1970s which showed that the hospital ranked among the best institutions in the world in regard to five-year survival rates for patients with carcinoma of the cervix.

For the most comprehensive analysis of the Cartwright Report and its relevance to modern screening programmes, see the 2019 encyclopaedic guide to screening published by Oxford University Press which draws on the Inquiry as a case study.

=== The medical review ===
A review of case notes by the medical advisors of women with CIS diagnosed from 1955 to 1976 identified women who might require further treatment or advice. The review also examined outcomes within 10 years of diagnosis of cervical CIS. This identified 1965 to 1974 as the time period with "a marked and statistically significant elevation in risk of developing invasion within 1-10 years", compared to time periods before and after, and within one year – the latter "suggesting that management during those years did not result in adequate exclusion of invasive cancer." This implies that new patients were not referred to Green after 1974, though existing patients remained under his care.

=== Other related findings ===
Other unethical practices exposed at the inquiry were Green's 'baby smears' study, approved by the Hospital Medical Committee in 1963, in which Green proposed to take some two to three thousand cervical smears from newborn baby girls in an attempt to prove that abnormal cells, which might be the forerunner of CIS, might be present at birth in female babies. When news of the neonatal study broke during the inquiry, there was a public furore, as no provision for parental knowledge or consent had been made. Judge Cartwright heard evidence, also, of disrespectful teaching practices, such as the insertion and removal of intrauterine devices on patients under general anaesthetic for other purposes, and vaginal examinations performed by undergraduates on anaesthetised women, in both cases without their prior knowledge or consent. The Report condemned such practices.

=== Report recommendations, resulting legal reforms and other changes ===
Recommendations in the Report of the Cervical Cancer Inquiry 1988 contributed to sweeping changes in law and practice around health and disability services’ consumers' rights in the 1990s and beyond.

An independent patient advocate was to be appointed at National Women’s Hospital, whose duty was to protect the patient and ensure that she received full information and the opportunity to consent to all procedures in which she might participate. In 1989 Lynda Williams was appointed to the position, becoming New Zealand’s first patient advocate. The recommendation for patient advocacy has since been applied generally with a free nationwide health and disability advocacy service,

The Cartwright Report recommended that the Human Rights Commission Act 1977 be amended to provide for a statement of patients' rights, and the appointment of a Health Commissioner. The Code of Health and Disability Services Consumers’ Rights, stating ten rights of health and disability services consumers and correlative duties owed to them by providers, was passed into law in regulations in 1996. The first Health and Disability Commissioner was appointed in 1994. The complaints regime became operational in July 1996.

The Cartwright Report recommended setting in place a system of regional ethics committees, focused on the protection of patients, independent of hospitals, of which half the members would be lay people. New Zealand now has a national system of ethics committees, to which research involving health and disability services consumers must be submitted for ethical approval before it can proceed.

The judge recommended the urgent implementation of a nationally organised population-based cervical screening programme, which became operational nationally in 1991.

== Legal consequences ==
Attempts to bring Green before medical disciplinary authorities failed because he was deemed, at 74, to be not mentally or physically fit enough to be charged. In 1990 the Medical Council of New Zealand found Professor Denis Bonham (Green's head of department and head of the Postgraduate School) guilty of disgraceful conduct, confirming the factual findings of the inquiry. In July 1990 two members of a working party charged, in 1975, with investigating complaints about Green’s trial and which recommended continuation, Dr Bruce Faris and Dr Richard Seddon, were each found guilty of ‘conduct unbecoming a medical practitioner’ on charges brought by the Preliminary Proceedings Committee of the Medical Council of New Zealand, despite an earlier attempt to persuade a court to stay the charges failing. Valerie Smith, a friend of Green’s, and his colleague, Dr Bruce Faris filed judicial review proceedings in the High Court, seeking to challenge Judge Cartwright’s findings in the Report. Mr Justice Barber struck out the proceedings by consent. Valerie Smith said "She now realised after listening to the Solicitor General’s submissions that she was wrong in thinking Judge Cartwright had relied on a Metro magazine article in her findings" and realised that Cartwright had not misinterpreted the McIndoe paper. Eventually 19 women who took legal action received compensation in an out-of-court settlement which stated that no fault or liability was admitted by the doctors or the institutions involved.

== Perspectives on the inquiry ==
=== Feminist perspectives ===
The inquiry was widely celebrated as one of the most important leaps forward in women's rights in New Zealand. In her book, Coney says "There was a danger that this significant event would go down as something to do with doctors and lawyers and that the women who initiated it and saw it through would be, like so many of their foremothers, written out of history."

The events surrounding the Committee of Inquiry have international importance as an example of a feminist challenge to patriarchal medical structures.

=== Medical perspectives ===
Coney and Bunkle created the popular groundswell of opinion that led to the inquiry. The inquiry hastened the introduction of cervical screening which was already being considered by the Health Department and Cancer Society prior to the inquiry, following recommendations by a working party chaired by Skegg.

=== Patient perspectives ===
The reforms initiated changes in ethics committees recommended by the inquiry and introduced the role of the Health and Disability Commissioner six years after the inquiry.

== Interpretations of Green's study since the inquiry ==
=== Defence of Green's practices ===
There have been many articles over time in the lay and academic press over the last thirty years, with some believed to take a 'revisionist' view of the Unfortunate Experiment. In 2009 University of Auckland Professor of History, Professor Linda Bryder, published an account of Green's study, arguing against almost every aspect of the Report, and defending Green's claims to the inquiry that there was no experiment and that his ‘treatment’ was not ‘unfortunate,’ but was a cautious approach reflective of medical uncertainties relating to the significance of positive smears and concerns about over-treatment. Bryder’s account has been both praised and criticised. The University of Auckland received complaints about Bryder’s interpretation. By contrast to these criticisms, historian of medicine Ilana Lowy who has written extensively on the history of cancer, including cervical cancer, in Britain and Europe, in a review in the book, wrote of Bryder’s ‘careful display of the complexities of the management of uncertainty in treatment of cervical malignancies’, and Cambridge Professor Emeritus of Haemotology Robin Carrell praised the book as ‘an outstanding example of the beneficial function of the medical historian.’

Similarly, Raffle et al support Green’s practices in a new look at the Cartwright Inquiry itself (chapter 8). Case study 8.5 within an international textbook on screening emphasises that Green's vulnerability to attack for his conservative approach stemmed from the worldwide uncertainty of evidence about cervical screening in the 1960s and the lack of agreed policy and quality standards for delivering a programme. The authors conclude that 'the practice that led subsequently to condemnation of Herbert Green was the fact that for several years during the late 1960s he conducted minimal excision by punch or wedge biopsy, with careful follow-up, for symptomless lesions detected through cytology and histology, including for some patients whose lesions were reported as showing evidence of microinvasion. This was at a time when there was ample scientific reason for concern about the damage caused by hysterectomy or cone biopsy and uncertainty about whether immediate use of these procedures was automatically the best thing to do for symptomless lesions, particularly in young women who might want children. Green's practice, although motivated by a desire to avoid unnecessary and damaging interventions in symptomless women, was easy for others to condemn due to the lack of any relevant policy, research, or ethical framework for cervical screening at that time.' In a paper in the Journal of Clinical Epidemiology in 2020 Iain Chalmers, champion of evidence-based medicine and co-founder of the international Cochrane organisation noted that "the Cartwright Inquiry provides no trustworthy evidence of harm from the adoption of the conservative management introduced by Green" "it is now clear that the treatment and monitoring methods introduced by Herb Green have benefited numerous women through avoidance of major surgery and preservation of fertility."

=== Doctors in Denial ===
Dr Ron Jones, whistle blower and an author of the 1984 McIndoe et al paper, published an insider’s account in 2017, having been on the staff of NWH as an obstetrician and gynaecologist from 1973. He notes a systematic failure by medical staff (except the whistle blowers) to address the central issue of patient safety, and records belated acknowledgement by senior medical staff that they turned a blind eye. See Doctors in Denial: The Forgotten Women in the 'Unfortunate Experiment.' Doctors in Denial was reviewed by bioethicist Carl Elliott in the Boston Review in November 2017 and by Linda Bryder in the Journal of New Zealand & Pacific Studies in 2019.

At the 2017 launch of the book, the New Zealand Committee of the Royal Australian and New Zealand College of Obstetricians and Gynaecologists apologised to Clare Matheson, who was ‘Ruth’ in the Metro article, on behalf of the women involved in the experiment. This was followed in August 2018, some 30 years later, by a written admission and apology to Matheson by the Auckland District Health Board. Matheson died less than a month later.

== Re-examination of patient data from NWH ==
The New Zealand Cancer Society funded a re-examination of all the patient data, led by Australian epidemiologist Dr Margaret McCredie. This had two aims: (1) to re-examine the invasive potential of CIS of the cervix, collecting new data on invasive cancers and deaths and using censoring techniques; (2) to describe the outcomes for the women who had treatment withheld or delayed, including women with microinvasive cancer.

In 2008, Natural history of cervical neoplasia and risk of invasive cancer in women with cervical intraepithelial neoplasia 3: a retrospective cohort study was published in Lancet Oncology. The 1229 women whose treatment was reviewed by the judicial inquiry in 1987–88 were included. Outcomes for 1063 (86% of 1229) women diagnosed with CIN3 at the hospital in 1955–76 were identified, after exclusions. In 143 women managed only by punch or wedge biopsy, cumulative incidence of invasive cancer of the cervix or vaginal vault was 31·3% at 30 years, and 50·3% in the subset of 92 such women who had persistent disease within 24 months. However, cancer risk at 30 years was only 0·7% in 593 women whose initial treatment was deemed adequate or probably adequate, and whose treatment for recurrent disease was conventional.

In 2010, Consequences in women of participating in a study of the natural history of cervical intraepithelial neoplasia 3 was published. Among women diagnosed in 1965–1974, those initially managed by punch or wedge biopsy alone had a cancer risk ten times higher than women initially treated with curative intent. The authors concluded that "during the ‘clinical study’ (1965–1974), women underwent numerous interventions that were aimed to observe rather than treat their condition, and their risk of cancer was substantially increased".

In 2018, Outcomes for women without conventional treatment for stage 1A (microinvasive) carcinoma of the cervix was published. The authors concluded that "Women with microinvasive carcinoma were included in a natural history study of CIN3; they underwent numerous procedures designed to observe rather than treat their condition, and had a substantial risk of invasive cancer.

== Numbers harmed ==
McIndoe et al in 1984 showed that 29 women diagnosed with CIS, and with evidence of ongoing disease, developed invasive cervical cancer and there were 8 deaths. The Medical Review showed a dramatic rise in the number of invasive cancers diagnosed within 10 years in patients with an initial diagnosis of CIS during the time period that Green was recruiting patients for his study (1965-1974, 7.7%) compared to before (1955–64, 1.7%) or after (1975-76, 1.7%). It was estimated that an additional 30 women developed invasive cancer in the middle period.

The subsequent re-examination of data from the same women has reaffirmed these findings: unnecessary multiple biopsies intended for diagnosis and not treatment; a total of 35 women with CIS/CIN3 developing invasive cancer who were initially managed by limited biopsy alone; eight deaths from cervical or vaginal vault cancer among these women, and a further six deaths among women first diagnosed with microinvasion who received non-curative treatment.

Hence the most conservative estimate of harm is 35 invasive cancers and 14 deaths. This is an underestimate because it does not include the many women who received a ring or cone biopsy or hysterectomy and yet had no treatment for persistent or recurrent disease, including those who were first diagnosed before 1965. The number harmed also does not include invasive cancers and deaths among women with CIS of the vulva.

== Bibliography ==
- Bryder, Linda (2009). A history of the 'unfortunate experiment' at National Women's Hospital. Auckland, N.Z.: Auckland University Press. ISBN 9781869404352.
- CPAC. "History and background". Cervical cancer control in Canada. Canadian Partnership Against Cancer.
- Cartwright, Silvia (5 August 1988). The Report of the Committee of Inquiry into Allegations Concerning the Treatment of Cervical Cancer at National Women's Hospital and into Other Related Matters. Auckland: Government Printing Office. ISBN 978-0-473-00664-8.
- Carrell, Robin (12 July 2012). "Trial by Media". Notes and Records of the Royal Society. 66 (3): 301–306. doi:10.1098/rsnr.2012.0028.
- "Cartwright Inquiry: The facts about the Cartwright Inquiry". 7 December 2011. Archived from the original on 7 July 2015.
- "Cartwright Inquiry". Women's Health Action Trust. Archived from the original on 27 May 2008. Time-line of events and additional links
- Cochrane, Archie L (1972). Effectiveness and Efficiency: Random Reflections on Health Services. London: Nuffield Provincial Hospitals Trust. ISBN 9781853153945.
- Coney, Sandra; Bunkle, Phillida (June 1987). "An Unfortunate Experiment at National Women's" (PDF). Metro. Auckland. pp. 47–65. Archived from the original (PDF) on 16 January 2020.
- Coney, Sandra (1988). The unfortunate experiment: The full story behind the inquiry into cervical cancer treatment. Auckland, N.Z.: Penguin Books. ISBN 9780140116717.
- Coney, Sandra, ed. (1993). Unfinished business: what happened to the Cartwright Report? : writings on the aftermath of 'the unfortunate experiment' at National Women's Hospital. Auckland, N.Z.: Women's Health Action Trust. ISBN 978-0-473-02018-7.
- Heslop, Barbara (6 August 2004). "All About Research – Looking back at the 1987 Cervical Cancer Inquiry" (PDF). New Zealand Medical Journal. 117 (1199): 16pp.
- McIndoe, WA; McLean, MR; Jones, RW; Mullins, PR (October 1984). "The invasive potential of carcinoma in situ of the cervix". Obstetrics and gynecology. 64 (4): 451–8. PMID 6483293.
- Raffle, Angela; Mackie, Anne; Gray, JA Muir (2019). Screening: Evidence and Practice. Oxford University Press. pp. 197 to 201.
- "Women's Health Action". 2014.
  - "Cartwright Inquiry". Archived from the original on 20 August 2016., at WHA (2014)
    - "Cartwright Inquiry". Archived from the original on 27 May 2008., at WHA (2014)
