= Green v Matheson =

- Court: Court of Appeal of New Zealand
- Full case name: George Herbert Green v Veronica Clare Matheson
- Decided: 27 October 1989
- Citation: [1989] NZCA 195; [1989] 3 NZLR 564; [1990] NZAR 49
- Transcript: Court of Appeal judgment

Court membership
- Judges sitting: Cooke P, Somers J, Casey J, Hardie Boys, Wylie J

Keywords
- negligence

Green v Matheson [1989] NZCA 195; [1989] 3 NZLR 564; [1990] NZAR 49 is a cited case in New Zealand regarding compensation for medical misadventure.

== Background ==
Matheson was a victim of the "unfortunate experiment" at the National Women's Hospital, which was investigated by the Cartwright Inquiry. Doctor Green was her gynaecologist. Barred by the Accident Compensation Act to sue for negligence, she sued instead for trespass to her person.

== Held ==
The Court of Appeal sitting as a bench of 5, ruled that her claim came under the term of medical misadventure, which was barred under the Act
