= Herb Green =

New Zealand obstetrician and gynecologist

Dr George Herbert "Herb" Green
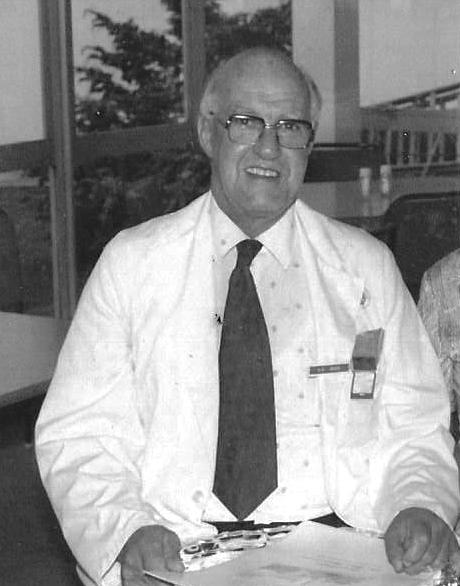
- Green in 1975
- Born: George Herbert Green; 16 November 1916; Balclutha, New Zealand
- Died: 4 March 2001 (aged 84); Auckland, New Zealand
- Occupation: Gynecologist
- Years active: 1946–1982
- Notable work: Introduction to Obstetrics

George Herbert Green (16 November 1916–4 March 2001), B.A., BSc, M.B., Ch.B., (D.Obs. R.C.O.G.), M.R.C.O.G.(Lond.), was a New Zealand obstetrician and gynaecologist who led the National Women's Hospital Cervical Cancer Unit as Professor through the 1960s and 1970s and became notorious for conducting an alleged unethical experiment that was the subject of the Cartwright Inquiry.

== Biography ==
Green was born in the rural South Otago town of Balclutha, New Zealand. He attended South Otago High School, where he studied University papers before even leaving high school. He later said that one of his teachers died of cervical cancer, and this sparked his lifelong interest in the disease.

=== University ===
Green attended the University of Otago and earned a B.A. in 1938, BSc (including pure and applied mathematics) in 1940, before studying Medicine. He graduated with M.B., Ch.B. in 1946, the same year as Sir Brian Barratt-Boyes. While at University he gained a Blue in Rugby, and also represented Southland in cricket. He was described as "a powerfully built man who towered over his colleagues".

=== Post-graduate study ===
Green worked at the National Women's Hospital as a House Officer and Registrar from 1948 to 1950. In 1948 he passed the RCOG Diploma in Obstetrics, scoring third highest in the exam. As a registrar he was reported to show an aptitude for statistics and analysis. He gained RCOG Membership in 1950.

In 1951 he went to work and study in the U.K., where he worked at the Queen Elizabeth Hospital in Gateshead, Tyne & Wear.

=== Work ===
In 1955 Green returned to New Zealand, as Consultant Obstetrician at Wanganui Hospital. In 1956, while attending a training course at the National Women's Hospital, he was recruited back to work there as a Consultant. He shifted back there in 1956, joining the 'D' team which was primarily responsible for treating reproductive tract cancers. Whilst becoming the senior consultant in D team it is an exaggeration to say that he saw "nearly every woman who came to the hospital with invasive cancer and many of those with the earlier or precursor stages", as was claimed around the time of the Inquiry.

He was concerned about risks of surgery leading to infertility, and Cartwright refers to him being "increasingly concerned at the number of young women undergoing hysterectomy for the disease (CIS) which he regarded as unnecessarily radical". Journalist Sandra Coney (1987) states that "He wanted to save women from mutilating surgery and to do so he had to prove what at first he had suspected and eventually came to believe: that CIS was a harmless disease which hardly, if ever, progressed to invasive cancer.".

Outside of his cervical cancer work he was an early proponent of the Pap smear, although not necessarily of population-based screening programmes. He was also anti-abortion, and opposed sterilisation without women's consent.

Green retired in 1982, although still actively engaged in academic debate to criticism from Skegg in 1985, but by the time of the Cartwright Inquiry in 1987, he was quite frail, ending up in hospital with pneumonia after several days of questioning.

=== Death ===
Green died in St John's Hospital, Auckland on 4 March 2001.

== "The unfortunate experiment" ==
Green was the doctor at the centre of the Cartwright Inquiry, a commission set up to examine claims that he had been experimenting on patients without their consent between 1966 and 1987 (supposedly continuing after his retirement in 1982). The inquiry argued that he had conducted a study between 1966 and 1987 in which the cases of women with major cervical abnormalities were followed without definitive treatment, in an attempt to prove his "personal belief" that these abnormalities were "not a forerunner of invasive cancer." A subsequent history by Linda Bryder found that Green's views, far from emanating from a personal belief, arose from his wide reading of the international literature which was questioning aggressive approaches to abnormal cells of the cervix or what was then called Carcinoma in situ. According to Judith Macdonald, a researcher at the University of Waikato, Green was strongly opposed to abortion, and that this influenced his views on management of abnormal cells of the cervix. This suggestion was refuted by Green and other witnesses at the Inquiry, and was explored in Bryder's history.

After Green retired, a paper was published in 1984 summarizing the fate of women diagnosed with carcinoma in situ at National Women's Hospital between 1955 and 1976. This paper came to the attention of Phillida Bunkle and Sandra Coney, who published an article entitled "An Unfortunate Experiment" in Metro Magazine in June 1987. (The full phrase "an unfortunate experiment at National Women's Hospital" first appeared the year before in the New Zealand Medical Journal, in a letter from Professor David Skegg.) From that time forward, media articles used the term "unfortunate experiment" extensively.

Defenders of Green argue that there was no experimentation, with or without patients' knowledge; that the allegation by Coney, Bunkle and others that he divided patients into two groups, one of which was treated, and one of which was not, was false (his patients were treated on a case-by-case basis); that he did not withhold treatment from patients; that his methods of treatment were not substandard, and have in fact come to be regarded as the international standard.

A 2010 study compared patients diagnosed with cervical carcinoma in situ during Green's study period with those diagnosed beforehand and afterwards (the three periods being 1955–64, 1965-74 - the 'study period', and 1975–76). This study claimed that his patients were at substantially greater risk of cancer and were subjected to numerous extra tests that were intended to observe rather than treat their conditions. The authors failed to recognise that these patients had been treated by one of the twenty or so consultants at the hospital and not exclusively by Green. The study concluded that eight of the eleven deaths among the women followed up occurred in the group who received punch or wedge biopsy as their initial management, but admitted that 'the numbers of deaths were too small to make reliable comparisons'. This publication along with the publication in 2009 of a history of the Cartwright Inquiry sparked an extensive debate in the New Zealand Medical Journal in 2010, including 39 letters to the editor and three editorials, one by the author of the history, Professor Linda Bryder, who argued that the 2010 retrospective study did not, as alleged, settle the debates about what happened at National Women's Hospital, and nor did it 'prove' that 'treatment of curative intent' had been withheld at the hospital. Iain Chalmers reached a similar conclusion and pointed out the debt owed to Green by all those women who have avoided needless surgery and kept their fertility. Other academics, such as Anne Else and Phillida Bunkle, dispute Bryder's claims and support the outcomes of the Cartwright Inquiry. David Skegg states that Chalmers' comments are one sided and misrepresent the Cartwright Inquiry's purpose. The Cartwright Inquiry, according to Skegg, was not a trial of Dr Green, as Chalmers interpreted it, but an inquiry into the treatment of CIS at National Women's Hospital during the period. Both Bryder (according to Bunkle) and Chalmers (according to Skegg) have seen this inquiry as an attack on the legacy of Green instead of a world-leading report that changed the way patient rights were handled at a national level in New Zealand. By contrast, Robin Carrell, distinguished professor of haematology at Cambridge University, described the inquiry as a 'trial by media'. For the most comprehensive analysis of the Cartwright Inquiry, including its findings and aftermath, see the 2019 encyclopaedic guide to screening published by Oxford University Press which draws on the Cartwright Inquiry as a case study.

Green graduated from Otago Medical School in 1945 and retired in the early 1980s, before the publication of the article in Metro. His specialities were gynaecology and obstetrics, and he wrote a textbook on the subject that underwent several revisions.

In 2017, the New Zealand Committee of the Royal Australian and New Zealand College of Obstetricians and Gynaecologists apologised to the women involved in the experiment. In 2020 the Journal of Clinical Epidemiology commissioned a series of articles relating to Green's practice in the 1960s and 1970s and to the subsequent Cartwright Inquiry, three of which are referenced here and the remainder can be found in the same June 2020 JCE issue, with correspondence published in the JCE November 2020. The full collection of articles and correspondence is indexed here https://www.jclinepi.com/content/cervical_screening_and_overdiagnosis .

== Publications ==
=== Books ===
- Introduction to Obstetrics, George Herbert Green, publisher N.M. Peryer, Christchurch, First Edition 1962

=== Journals ===
- Screening for cervical cancer. Green GH. NZ Med J. 1985; 98; 698.
- Rising cervical cancer mortality in young New Zealand women. Green GH. NZ Med J. 1979 Feb 14;89(629):89-91.
- Cervical cancer and cytology screening in New Zealand. Green GH. Br J Obstet Gynaecol. 1978 Dec;85(12):881-6.
- Cytology and cervical cancer in New Zealand. Green GH. Ir Med J. 1977 Aug 26;70(12):361-3.
- Radiation-induced immune changes in patients with cancer of the cervix. Yamagata S, Green GH. Br J Obstet Gynaecol. 1976 May;83(5):400-8.
- The progression of pre-invasive lesions of the cervix to invasion. Green GH. NZ Med J 1974; 80; 279-287.
- Herpesvirus-type-2 antibodies and carcinoma of the cervix. Rawls WE, Iwamoto K, Adam E, Melnick JL, Green GH. Lancet. 1970 Nov 28;2(7683):1142-3.
- Duration of symptoms and survival rates for invasive cervical cancer. Green GH. Aust N Z J Obstet Gynaecol. 1970 Nov;10(4):238-43.
- The foetus began to cry ... abortion. 3. Green GH. N Z Nurs J. 1970 Sep;63(9):11-2.
- The foetus began to cry ... abortion. 2. Green GH. N Z Nurs J. 1970 Aug;63(8):6-7.
- The foetus began to cry ... abortion. 1. Green GH. N Z Nurs J. 1970 Jul;63(7):11-2.
- Cervical carcinoma in situ: An atypical viewpoint. Green GH. Aust N Z J Obstet Gynaecol. 1970 Feb;10(1):41-8.
- The natural history of cervical carcinoma in situ. Green GH, Donovan JW. J Obstet Gynaecol Br Commonw. 1970 Jan;77(1):1-9.
- A royal obstetric tragedy and the epitaph. Green GH. N Z Nurs J. 1969 Jul;62(7):7-11.
- A royal obstetric tragedy and the epitaph. Green GH. N Z Med J. 1969 May;69(444):301-5.
- Invasive potentiality of cervical carcinoma in situ. Green GH. Int J Obstet Gynecol 1969; 7; 157-171.
- Vaginal carcinoma in situ following hysterectomy. McIndoe WA, Green GH. Acta Cytol. 1969 Mar;13(3):158-62.
- Is cervical carcinoma in situ a significant lesion? Green GH. Int Surg 1967;47; 511-517.
- Maori maternal mortality in New Zealand. Green GH. N Z Med J. 1967 May;66(417):295-9.
- Pregnancy following cervical carcinoma in situ. A review of 60 cases. Green GH. J Obstet Gynaecol Br Commonw. 1966 Dec;73(6):897-902.
- Cervical cone biopsy with octapressin. Green GH. Aust N Z J Obstet Gynaecol. 1966 Aug;6(3):259-65.
- Percutaneous arterial infusion for pelvic malignancy. Campbell BL, Green GH. Aust N Z J Obstet Gynaecol. 1966 May;6(2):185-9.
- The significance of cervical carcinoma in situ. Green GH. Am J Obstet Gynecol. 1966 Apr 1;94(7):1009-22.
- The significance of cervical carcinoma in situ. Green GH. Aust N Z J Obstet Gynaecol. 1966 Feb;6(1):42-4.
- Trends in maternal mortality. Green GH. N Z Med J. 1966 Feb;65(402):80-6.
- The place of foetal transfusion in haemolytic disease. A report of 22 Transfusions in 16 patients. Green GH, Liley AW, Liggins GC Aust N Z J Obstet Gynaecol. 1965 May;5:53-9.
- "Break-Through" Bleeding and cervical cancer. Green GH Br Med J. 1965 Apr 10;1(5440):997.
- Cervical cytology and carcinoma in situ. Green GH J Obstet Gynaecol Br Commonw. 1965 Feb;72:13-22.
- Uterine rupture following intranasal oxytocin. Green GH N Z Med J. 1965 Feb;64:79-80.
- Cervical Carcinoma in situ: True cancer or non-invasive lesion? Green GH Aust N Z J Obstet Gynaecol. 1964 Dec;4:165-73.
- Ovarian twin pregnancy. Report of a case. Green GH, West SR. Obstet Gynecol. 1963 Jan;21:126-8.
- Carcinoma in situ of the uterine cervix: consecutive management in 84 of 190 cases. Green GH. Aust NZ J Obstet Gynaecol 1962; 2; 49-57.
- Solid malignant teratoma of the ovary. Green GH. Am J Obstet Gynecol. 1960 May;79:999-1001.
- Placenta praevia. A review of 242 cases and the principles of management. Green GH. J Obstet Gynaecol Br Emp. 1959 Aug;66:640-8.
- Tubal ligation. Green GH. N Z Med J. 1958 Oct;57(321):470-7.
- Foetal renal hypoplasia and the origin of amniotic fluid. Green GH. J Obstet Gynaecol Br Emp. 1955 Aug;62(4):592-6.

== Notes ==
- Bryder, L. (2010) Guest editorial: A response to criticisms of the History of the 'Unfortunate Experiment' at National Women's Hospital, New Zealand Medical Journal, 123, (1319), 14–21, 2010. https://www.nzma.org.nz/journal/read-the-journal/all-issues/2010-2019/2010/vol-123-no-1319/editorial-bryder
- Heslop, Barbara (6 August 2004). "'All about research'—looking back at the 1987 Cervical Cancer Inquiry". New Zealand Medical Journal. 117 (1199). Archived from the original on 9 July 2011.
  - Response, and rejoinder:Auckland Women’s Health Council (24 September 2004). "Looking back at the 1987 Cervical Cancer Inquiry". New Zealand Medical Journal. 117 (1202). Archived from the original on 8 July 2009.
- Cartwright inquiry, Women's Health Action Trust
