= Rosemary Du Plessis =

New Zealand sociologist

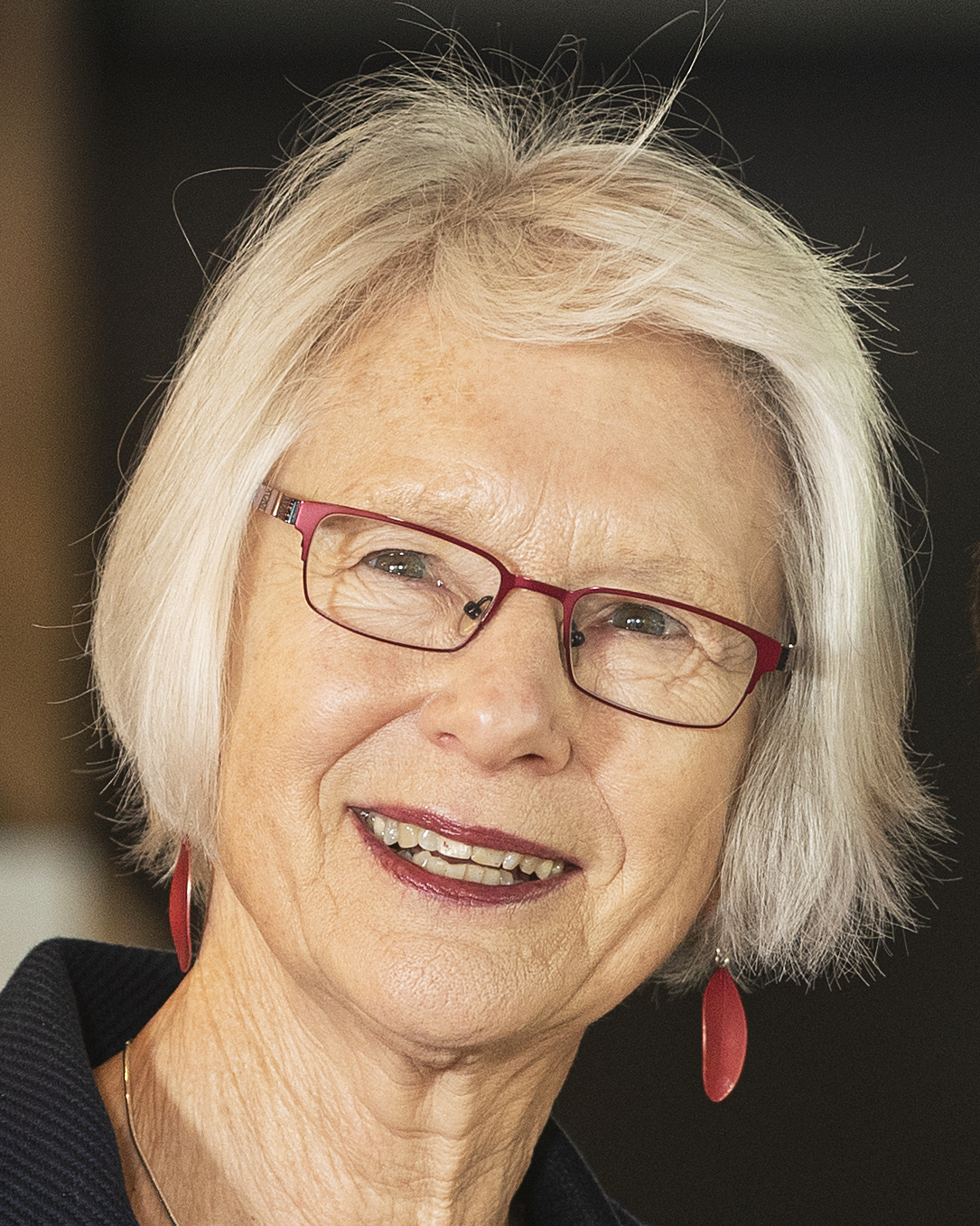
- Awards: Officer of the New Zealand Order of Merit

Academic background
- Education: University of Canterbury

Rosemary Ann Du Plessis ONZM is a New Zealand academic sociologist, and is an adjunct associate professor at the University of Canterbury. In 2020 she was appointed an Officer of the New Zealand Order of Merit for services to women and education.

== Academic career ==
Du Plessis completed a Masters degree in sociology at the University of Canterbury, which she began in 1973. Du Plessis has worked at the University of Canterbury since 1974, and as of 2024 is an adjunct associate professor in the Sociology, Anthropology and Human Services Department of the Faculty of Arts. Du Plessis's gender studies courses were some of the first in New Zealand, and she co-established the University of Canterbury's Feminist Studies programme.

Du Plessis has research interests in gender, family and paid and unpaid work, and ethical implications of new technologies. She led a multidisciplinary study into genetic testing and biobanking, and an oral history project recording women's stories about the Canterbury earthquakes.

Du Plessis was the theme editor for Social Connections at Te Ara: The Encyclopedia of New Zealand for two years. She spent five years as the Commissioner for Social and Human Sciences at the New Zealand National Commission for UNESCO, and has served on the Council of the Royal Society Te Apārangi, as well as chairing its Social Science Advisory Committee. Du Plessis has held national roles on committees or boards for the National Council of Women of New Zealand, the National Advisory Committee on the Employment of Women, the Ministry of Women's Affairs Advisory Committee, the Women's Studies Association and the New Horizons for Women Trust.

In 2019 Du Plessis was invited to launch Past Caring? Women, Work and Emotion, a social history book by Barbara Brookes, Angela Wanhalla and Jane McCabe, in Dunedin.

== Honours and awards ==
In the 2020 Queen's Birthday Honours, Du Plessis was appointed an Officer of the New Zealand Order of Merit for services to women and education, with the citation noting that she was a "pioneer of gender studies" and "contributed to the advancement of women’s rights and education for the past 45 years". Du Plessis was the research coordinator for an oral history of women's stories about the Canterbury earthquakes, which won the Mary Fran Myers award for research into gender issues in disasters and emergency management in 2014.

== Selected works ==
=== Edited books ===
- Du Plessis, Rosemary; Bunkle, Phillida, eds. (1992). Feminist voices : women's studies texts for Aotearoa/New Zealand. Oxford University Press. ISBN 019558239X.
- Du Plessis, Rosemary; Alice, Lynne, eds. (1998). Feminist thought in Aotearoa/New Zealand : differences and connections. Oxford University Press. ISBN 0195583566.

=== Journal articles ===
- du Plessis, Rosemary Ann; Mohini Vidwans (2023). "Gender, careers, and kids: a qualitative study of the partners of international employees". Kotuitui: New Zealand Journal Of Social Sciences Online: 1–19. doi:10.1080/1177083x.2023.2252873. Wikidata Q122890768.
- du Plessis, Rosemary Ann; Fairbairn, Peggy (2009). "The ethics of knowledge production – Pacific challenges". International Social Science Journal. 60 (195): 109–114. doi:10.1111/j.1468-2451.2009.01704.x. Wikidata Q127790931.
- Tony Stanley; du Plessis, Rosemary Ann; Terry Austrin (2010). "Making Networks Work: Social Work Action and Children 'At Risk'". Qualitative Social Work (in German). 10 (1): 49–65. doi:10.1177/1473325010379629. Wikidata Q127790932.
- Hindmarsh, Richard; du Plessis, Rosemary Ann (2008). "The new civic geography of life sciences governance: transitions and trajectories in Australia and New Zealand". New Genetics and Society. 27 (3): 175–180. doi:10.1080/14636770802326851. Wikidata Q57702610.
- Hindmarsh, Richard; du Plessis, Rosemary Ann (2008). "GMO regulation and civic participation at the "edge of the world": the case of Australia and New Zealand". New Genetics and Society. 27 (3): 181–199. doi:10.1080/14636770802326869. Wikidata Q57702606.
- Leechin Heng; Quinlivan, Kathleen Anne; du Plessis, Rosemary Ann (10 September 2018), ‘Working the Space’ towards the Vision of Inclusion from One Initial Teacher (ITE) Education Programme in Aotearoa, New Zealand, pp. 47–58, doi:10.1163/9789004391000_008, Wikidata Q111097383
