= Linda Bryder =

New Zealand medical historian (born 1956)

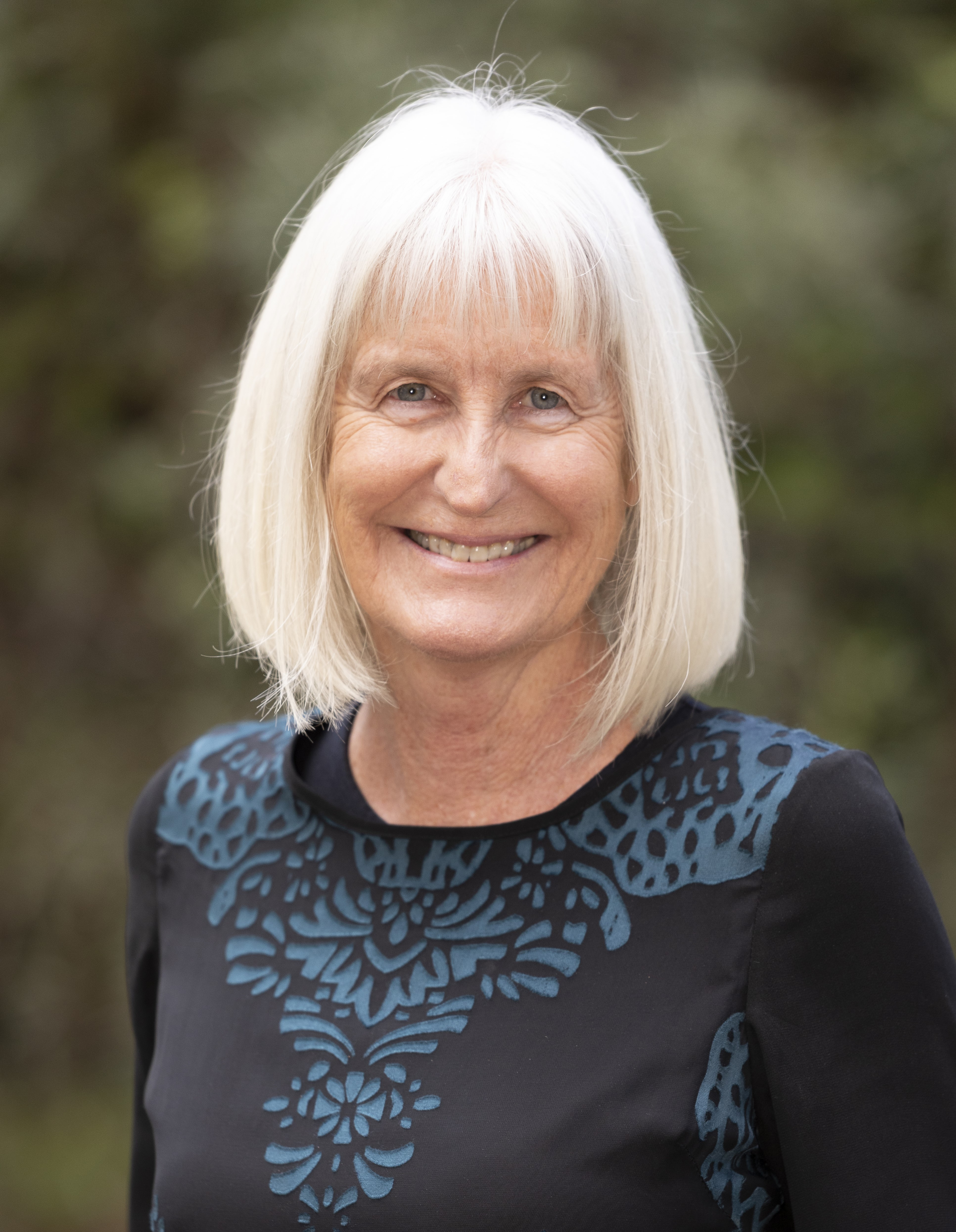
- Bryder in 2021
- Born: 14 January 1956 (age 70)
- Education: University of Oxford, Faculty of Modern History
- Scientific career
- Fields: Medical history
- Workplaces: University of Auckland
- Thesis: The problem of tuberculosis in England and Wales, 1900–1950 (1985)

Linda Bryder (born 1956) is a New Zealand medical history academic. In 2008, she was appointed professor at the University of Auckland.

== Academic career ==
After completing a MA(Hons) at the University of Auckland, and a 1985 DPhil thesis on the social history of tuberculosis in Britain, at the University of Oxford, Bryder returned to Auckland, where she continued her research into the social history of medicine.

Bryder's highest profile work has been in relation to the Cartwright Inquiry into the 'unfortunate experiment'. Her 2009 book A History of the 'Unfortunate Experiment' at National Women's Hospital did not support one of the inquiry's central findings (that there had been a prospective study) and attracted a great deal of attention in academia and in the popular press. In 2010, Bryder wrote an editorial in the New Zealand Medical Journal, by invitation, responding to criticisms of her book. In 2018, she published a letter in the New Zealand Medical Journal drawing on new relevant international research. In 2019 and 2020, studies were published in Britain validating her original findings.

Bryder has over 100 academic publications. These include a history of National Women's Hospital and a history of the Royal New Zealand Plunket Society, and her 2024 book The Best Country to Give Birth? which investigates the midwifery movement in New Zealand.

In 2009, Bryder was elected a Fellow of the Royal Society of New Zealand.

== Selected works ==
- Bryder, Linda (1987). "The first world war: healthy or hungry?." History Workshop Journal, vol. 24, no. 1, pp. 141–157. Oxford University Press.
- Bryder, Linda (1988). Below the magic mountain: a social history of tuberculosis in twentieth-century Britain. Oxford University Press.
- Bryder, Linda (ed.) (1991). A Healthy Country: Essays on the Social History of Medicine in New Zealand. Bridget Williams Books.
- Bryder, Linda (2003). A voice for mothers : the Plunket Society and infant welfare, 1907–2000. Auckland University Press. ISBN 1-86940-290-1. OCLC 53216096.
- Rice, Geoffrey, and Linda Bryder (2005). Black November: the 1918 influenza pandemic in New Zealand. University of Canterbury,.
- Bryder, Linda (2008). "Debates about Cervical Screening: An Historical Overview", Journal of Epidemiology and Community Health, 62 (4), 284–287. DOI:10.1136/jech.2006.059246.
- Bryder, Linda (2009). A History of the 'Unfortunate Experiment' at National Women's Hospital. Auckland University Press.
- Bryder, Linda (2014). The Rise and Fall of National Women’s Hospital: A History. Auckland University Press.
