= Lianne Parkin =

New Zealand public health professor

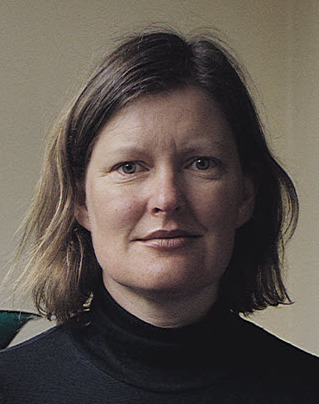
- Parkin in 2003
- Awards: Ig Nobel Prize

Academic background
- Education: University of Otago
- Thesis: Risk factors for venous thromboembolism (2008)
- Doctoral advisor: Charlotte Paul, David Skegg

Lianne Parkin is a New Zealand academic, and is a full professor at the University of Otago, specialising in public health and the safety of medicines.

== Academic career ==
Parkin completed a medical degree and a postgraduate diploma in obstetrics at the University of Otago, and practised as a GP in New Zealand and Australia. PhD titled Risk factors for venous thromboembolism at the University of Otago, supervised by Charlotte Paul and David Skegg. Parkin then joined the faculty of the university, rising to associate professor in 2019, and full professor in 2023.

Parkin has researched the association between blood clots and flying, finding that long-distance flights did increase the risk of pulmonary embolism but that dying from the condition was still rare. She and her research group have also investigated the link between the cholesterol-lowering drugs statins and the muscle disease rhabdomyolysis, and noted an increased risk of the kidney condition interstitial nephritis from the use of proton-pump inhibitors. Parkin has received grant funding to investigate how type 2 diabetics in New Zealand use metformin.

During the COVID-19 pandemic, Parkin studied the proportion of people scanning QR codes at public venues to enable contact tracing. She also looked at the proportion of students at the university reporting their Covid infections, finding that although more than 94% of surveyed student flats had cases during the study period, more than a third of infected students did not report their positive test result.

== Honours and awards ==
In 2010, Parkin and collaborators Patricia Priest and Sheila Williams won an Ig Nobel Prize for demonstrating that, on icy footpaths in wintertime, people slip and fall less often if they wear socks on the outside of their shoes. The Ig Nobel Prizes are given to "honour achievements that first make people laugh, and then make them think". The advice to wear socks over shoes on icy streets is given by Dunedin City Council, where the study was conducted, although Parkin's study noted that some people are too self-conscious to wear them even after experiencing the benefits.

== Selected works ==
- Parkin, Lianne; Sharples, Katrina Jane; Rohini K Hernandez; Jick, Susan S. (2011). "Risk of venous thromboembolism in users of oral contraceptives containing drospirenone or levonorgestrel: nested case-control study based on UK General Practice Research Database". The BMJ. 342 d2139. doi:10.1136/bmj.d2139. PMC 3081041. PMID 21511804. Wikidata Q34836664.
- Mei-Ling Blank; Parkin, Lianne; Paul, Charlotte E.; Herbison, Peter Graham (2014). "A nationwide nested case-control study indicates an increased risk of acute interstitial nephritis with proton pump inhibitor use". Kidney International. 86 (4): 837–844. doi:10.1038/ki.2014.74. PMC 4184187. PMID 24646856. Wikidata Q34285084.
- Parkin, Lianne; Skegg, David Christopher Graham; M Wilson; Herbison, Peter Graham; Paul, Charlotte E. (2000). "Oral contraceptives and fatal pulmonary embolism". The Lancet. 355 (9221): 2133–2134. doi:10.1016/s0140-6736(00)02382-5. PMID 10902629. Wikidata Q50662585.
- Parkin, Lianne; Siân Sweetland; Angela Balkwill; Jane Green; Reeves, Gillian; Beral, Valerie; Million Women Study Collaborators (2012). "Body mass index, surgery, and risk of venous thromboembolism in middle-aged women: a cohort study". Circulation. 125 (15): 1897–1904. doi:10.1161/circulationaha.111.063354. PMID 22394567. Wikidata Q50501295.
- Parkin, Lianne; Skegg, David Christopher Graham; Herbison, Peter Graham; Paul, Charlotte E. (2003). "Psychotropic drugs and fatal pulmonary embolism". Pharmacoepidemiology and Drug Safety. 12 (8): 647–652. doi:10.1002/pds.841. PMID 14762980. Wikidata Q44755829.
