= Garth Carnaby =

New Zealand physicist (b. 1950)

Garth Carnaby CNZM
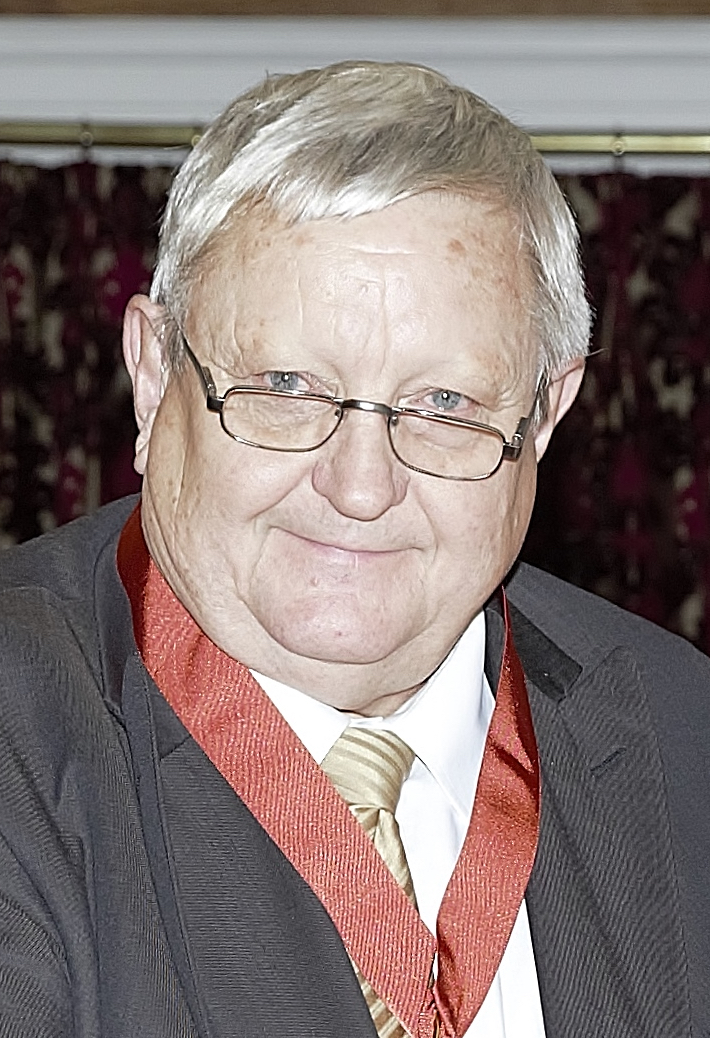
- Carnaby in 2018
- Born: Garth Alan Carnaby; 1950 (age 75–76)
- Other name: Garth Alan Carnaby
- Education: University of Leeds
- Scientific career
- Thesis: The structure and mechanical properties of wool carpet yarns (1976)

Garth Alan Carnaby CNZM (born 1950) is a New Zealand fibre physicist and science and public administrator.

== Biography ==
Carnaby completed a PhD at the Department of Textile Industries at University of Leeds in 1976. The title of his doctoral thesis was The structure and mechanical properties of wool carpet yarns. He then returned to New Zealand, where he rose to become managing director of the Wool Research Organisation of New Zealand.

In 1989 Carnaby received a DSc by thesis (Publications and papers on wool and the wool industry) from the University of New South Wales, followed by an honorary DSc from Lincoln University in 2010.

Carnaby served as president of the Royal Society of New Zealand from 2009 to 2012, preceded by Neville Jordan and followed by David Skegg.

Carnaby has also served as chair of the board of the Canterbury Development Corporation and chair for Marsden Fund Council (2005–2009). He has served as 'Entrepreneur in Residence' and chair of the Research and Commercialisation Committee at Lincoln University.

== Honours ==
In 1992, Carnaby was elected as a Fellow of the Royal Society of New Zealand.

In the 2006 Queen's Birthday Honours, Carnaby was appointed a Member of the New Zealand Order of Merit, for services to the wool industry. He was promoted to Companion of the same order in the 2018 New Year Honours, for services to science and governance.

== Selected works ==
- Carnaby, Garth A., and Ning Pan. "Theory of the compression hysteresis of fibrous assemblies." Textile Research Journal 59.5 (1989): 275–284.
- Postle, Ron, Garth Alan Carnaby, and Stuart De Jong. "The mechanics of wool structures." (1988).
- Lee, Dae Hoon, and Garth A. Carnaby. "Compressional Energy of the Random Fiber Assembly: Part I: Theory." Textile research journal 62.4 (1992): 185–191.
- Pan, N., and Garth A. Carnaby. "Theory of the shear deformation of fibrous assemblies." Textile Research Journal 59.5 (1989): 285–292.

Professional and academic associations
Preceded by Neville Jordan	President of the Royal Society of New Zealand; 2009–2012	Succeeded by David Skegg
