= Charlotte Paul =

New Zealand doctor, epidemiologist and emeritus professor

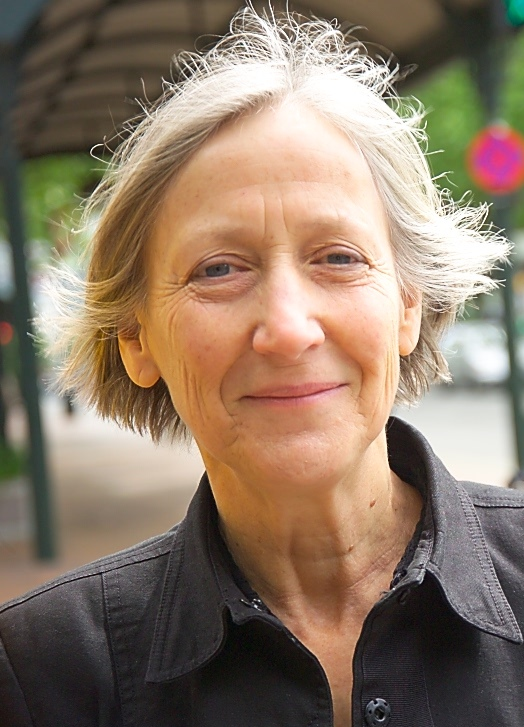
- Paul in 2007

Academic background
- Education: University of Otago
- Thesis: The role of steroid contraception in the aetiology of breast cancer : a thesis submitted for the degree of Doctor of Philosophy at the University of Otago, Dunedin, New Zealand (1992)

Academic work
- Doctoral students: Ann Richardson, Lianne Parkin

Charlotte Entrican Paul (born 1948) is a New Zealand doctor, epidemiologist and emeritus professor at the University of Otago.

== Early life and education ==
Paul was born in 1948, the second daughter of publishers Janet and Blackwood Paul and sister of the artist Joanna Paul. She completed her PhD at the University of Otago in 1992.

== Academic career ==
Paul became an associate professor in the Department of Preventive and Social Medicine at the University of Otago in 1993. She is an emeritus professor in the same department. Her fields of research have included HIV/Aids, women's cancers, screening, contraception and epidemiology. She directed the Aids Epidemiology Group for 20 years, monitoring HIV/Aids in New Zealand.

Notable doctoral students of Paul's include Ann Richardson and Lianne Parkin.

== Views and positions ==
In the 2020s Paul became concerned about the use of puberty blockers to delay the normally-timed puberty of children. She wrote articles for the New Zealand weekly magazine The Listener, and the monthly magazine North and South. She was also quoted in a Radio New Zealand story questioning New Zealand's guidelines on puberty blockers, with Paul stating, "The New Zealand Guidelines for Gender Affirming Care do not refer to the fact that this is an unapproved indication, or to the Medical Council guidelines and the need to ensure that patients know that this is an unapproved indication", and the story stating, "New Zealand was out of step with many other countries, which were moving to a more cautious approach, she said." In early 2023, the New Zealand Ministry of Health removed a line stating that puberty blockers "are a safe and fully reversible medicine" from its website.

In mid-November 2025, Paul welcomed the New Zealand Government's decision to suspend the issuing of puberty blockers in light of the Cass review, saying that New Zealand clinicians should "give a pause for thought" and accused some of abandoning "normal standards of consent for children."

== Personal life ==
Paul is married to Kevin Cunningham.

== Selected works ==
- Paul, Charlotte (12 October 2011). "Keep the ethical safeguards in medical research". New Zealand Herald.
- Paul, Charlotte (December 2019) 'Epidemics expose public health failures' Newsroom.
- Paul, Charlotte (17 May 2020) 'Covid-19 and the common good'. The Spinoff
