= Edwina Palmer =

English academic (born 1955)

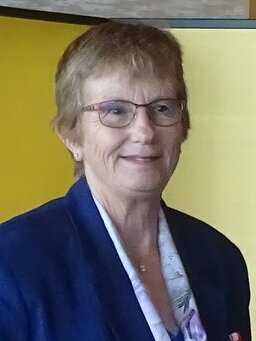
- Palmer in 2018
- Born: 1955 (age 70–71); Chelmsford, United Kingdom
- Spouse: Geoffrey Rice
- Awards: Order of the Rising Sun, Gold Rays with Rosette

Academic background
- Education: School of Oriental and African Studies, University of London

Academic work
- Discipline: Japanese Studies, Geography
- Institutions: University of Canterbury, Victoria University of Wellington

Edwina Palmer is a former associate professor of Japanese Studies at Victoria University of Wellington, New Zealand.

Palmer was born in Chelmsford, United Kingdom in 1955. She studied at the School of Oriental and African Studies, University of London, graduating with a PhD in geography and a BA (Hons) in Japanese language and literature. She lectured at the University of Canterbury, Christchurch, New Zealand from 1984 to 2010, before joining Victoria University in Wellington.

Palmer has written many articles on Japanese culture, focusing on humor and hidden meaning in traditional Japanese texts. She has also worked on the eighth-century document Harima no Kuni Fudoki, analyzing the stories it contains from the perspective of archaeology and orality, humor and hidden meaning. Some of her work is prepared jointly with her husband, the historian Geoffrey Rice.

== Awards ==
In 2012, Palmer won the 6th Inoue Yasushi Award for her article, A Poem to Carp About: Poem 16–3828 of the Man'yōshū Collection. The article examined what was previously thought to be a nonsense poem and the satirical social message of the poem was found to be hidden in double entendre and puns. She is the first New Zealander to have received the award.

In 2018, Palmer was awarded the Order of the Rising Sun, Gold Rays with Rosette by the Government of Japan, for her "contributions towards promoting the understanding and appreciation of the Japanese language and culture in New Zealand and overseas; as well as Japan-related research literature".
