= Janet Paul =

New Zealand publisher, painter and art historian

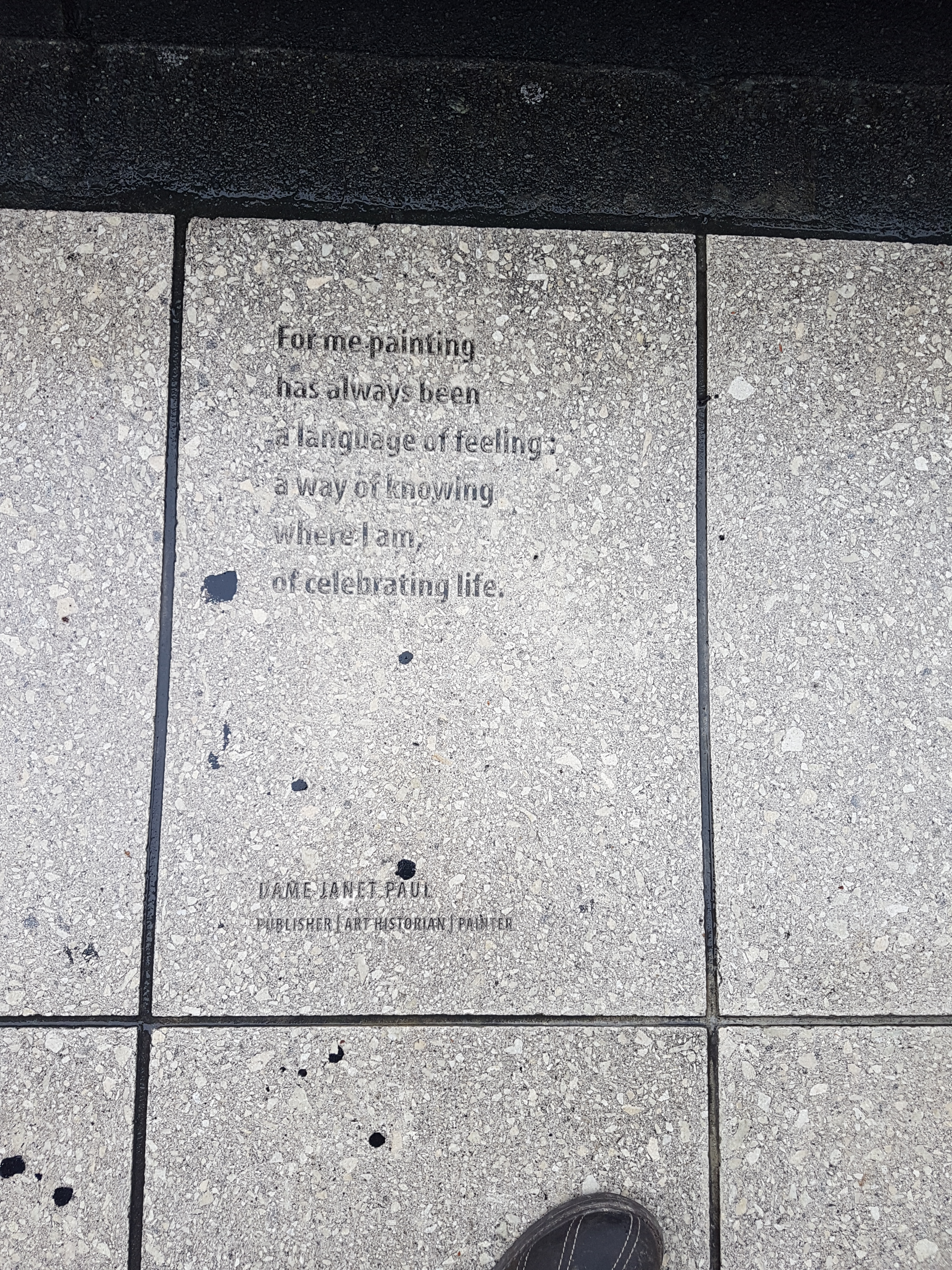
Tinakore Village artist plaque

Dame Janet Elaine Paul DNZM (née Wilkinson; 9 November 1919 – 28 July 2004) was a New Zealand publisher, painter and art historian, based in Wellington.

She was married to Blackwood Paul and they had a bookselling and publishing business together. Their publishing house, Blackwood and Janet Paul, specialised in New Zealand literature and society, publishing important works such as The Maori People in the Nineteen Sixties (1968), which included essays by eminent Māori scholars Bruce Biggs and Pei Te Hurinui Jones, and Hone Tuwhare's first collection of poetry No Ordinary Sun (1964). After her husband's death, she was courted by Denis Glover, one of the poets they published. From 1971 to 1980, she was art librarian at the Alexander Turnbull Library in Wellington.

Janet and Blackwood Paul had four daughters. Their eldest daughter, Joanna Margaret Paul, became a well-known New Zealand artist, poet, publisher and film-maker, while their second daughter, Charlotte Paul, is a doctor, epidemiologist and emeritus professor at the University of Otago. Their third daughter, Mary Paul is retired scholar of New Zealand literature, particularly the work of Robin Hyde. Their youngest daughter, Jane Paul, was also an artist and worked at the National Film Archive and then Ngā Taonga Sound & Vision.

In the 1997 Queen's Birthday Honours, Paul was appointed a Dame Companion of the New Zealand Order of Merit, for services to publishing, writing and painting.
