= Neville Jordan =

New Zealand electrical engineer and businessperson (b. 1943)

Sir Neville Jordan KNZM CRSNZ
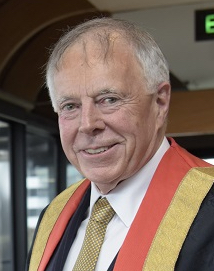
- Jordan in 2017

Chancellor of Victoria University of Wellington
- In office 2015–2018
- Preceded by: Ian McKinnon
- Succeeded by: Neil Paviour-Smith

Personal details
- Born: 15 May 1943 (age 83) Petone, New Zealand
- Education: University of Canterbury

Military service
- Branch/service: Royal New Zealand Naval Volunteer Reserve
- Years of service: ? - 1995
- Rank: Lieutenant

Sir Neville Jordan KNZM CRSNZ (born 15 May 1943) is a New Zealand electrical engineer and businessman.

== Biography ==
Born in Petone on 15 May 1943, Jordan was the third child of Hercules Jordan, a welder, and only child of Lydia Marie Jordan (née Ashman), a laundry worker. After completing the engineering intermediate year at Victoria University of Wellington, Jordan studied electrical engineering at the University of Canterbury from 1964 to 1966, graduation with a Bachelor of Engineering in 1967. He was a New Zealand universities judo representative. After graduating, he worked for companies including IBM and Philips.

In 1975, Jordan founded MAS Technology, a microwave technology company whose IPO was on the NASDAQ main board.

In 1995, he founded the Jordan Foundation, which provides scholarships for higher learning and support for the arts. In 1998, he founded venture capital business Endeavour Capital, which has invested in more than 35 New Zealand start-ups.

Jordan was president of the Royal Society of New Zealand between 2006 and 2009; preceded by Jim Watson and followed by Garth Carnaby.

From 2015 to 2018, Jordan was chancellor of Victoria University of Wellington, having been a member of the university council since 2013.

== Honours and awards ==
In the 1999 Queen's Birthday Honours, Jordan was appointed a Companion of the New Zealand Order of Merit, for services to telecommunications and export. He was conferred an honorary DEng degree by the University of Canterbury. In 2012, he was recognised as Wellingtonian of the year. In the 2015 New Year Honours, he was promoted to Knight Companion of the New Zealand Order of Merit, for services to business, science and the community. He is a Companion of Royal Society Te Apārangi.

In 2006, Jordan was inducted into the New Zealand Business Hall of Fame.

Jordan is retired officer of the Royal New Zealand Naval Volunteer Reserve and an honorary Captain of the Royal New Zealand Navy.
