= Sandra Coney =

NZ politician, writer, feminist, historian, and women's health campaigner

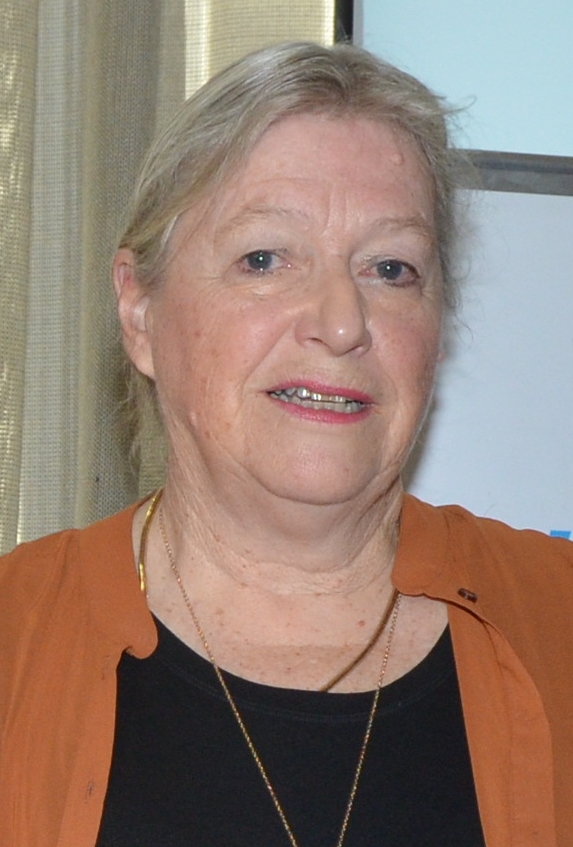
Coney in 2017

Sandra Lorraine Coney QSO (née Pearce, born 22 October 1944) is a New Zealand local-body politician, writer, feminist, historian, and women's health campaigner.

== Early life and family ==
Coney was born in Auckland on 22 October 1944, the daughter of Doris Margaret Pearce (née Morgan) and Tom Pearce. Her father chaired the Auckland Regional Council from 1965 to 1976 and was a New Zealand Rugby Football Union administrator. Coney was educated at Auckland Girls' Grammar School, and went on to study at the University of Auckland, where she completed a Bachelor of Arts degree.

== Activist career ==
She is best known for her co-authorship (with Phillida Bunkle) of a Metro magazine article that alleged that women had been experimented on, without their consent, at National Women's Hospital in Auckland. The article, titled 'The Unfortunate Experiment', led to the controversial Cartwright Inquiry, which confirmed the article's allegations. The article and the subsequent inquiry are seen as a turning point in healthcare ethics in New Zealand.

Coney has been involved in other women's health causes, and in 1984 co-founded with Bunkle Women's Health Action to co-ordinate claims by women who had been injured by the Dalkon Shield IUD. Coney was the co-founder of the feminist magazine Broadsheet, which she co-edited for 14 years. She is the author or editor of 14 books, including the major Suffrage Centennial publication Standing in the Sunshine (1993), which was also a television series. She wrote a regular column of political and social comment for the Sunday-Times for 16 years from 1986.

She is also involved in the local politics of the Piha area such as the unsuccessful campaign against the Piha cafe. She has also written a history of Piha, and is currently researching Anzac soldiers from the Piha area.

== Political career ==
Auckland Council
Years	Ward	Affiliation
2010–2013	Waitakere	Best for the West

Between 2001 and 2010, Coney represented Waitakere City on the Auckland Regional Council (ARC), and served as Chair of the Parks and Heritage Committee between 2004 and 2010.

In October 2010, she was elected as a representative of the Waitākere Ward on the Auckland Council on the Best for the West ticket. She was also elected as an independent representative on the Waitematā District Health Board.

In the 2013 Auckland local elections, Coney stood down as a councillor, endorsing fellow Future West candidate Christine Rose for the position. She was re-elected to the Waitemata District Health Board, and was elected to a new role as chair of the Waitakere Ranges Local Board, having received the most votes of any of the board's members.

At the 2016 Auckland elections, Coney stood for Future West and was re-elected to the Waitākere Ranges Local Board, the Waitemata District Health Board and the Portage Licensing Trust.

== Writing career ==
Coney is the author of more than 30 books on topics including history, feminism, and women's health care.

== Honours ==
In 1990, Coney received the New Zealand 1990 Commemoration Medal, and in 1993 she was awarded the New Zealand Suffrage Centennial Medal. In the 2010 Queen's Birthday Honours, Coney was appointed a Companion of the Queen's Service Order, for services to women's health.

== Selected bibliography ==
- 2009: Piha: guardians of the iron sands: the first 75 years of the Piha Surf Life Saving Club. Piha Surf Life Saving, ISBN 978-0-473-14906-2
- 1998: Stroppy sheilas and gutsy girls: New Zealand women of dash and daring. Tandem Press, ISBN 1-877178-29-2
- 1997: Piha: a history in images. Keyhole Press, ISBN 0-473-04883-3
- 1996: Feeling fabulous at 40, 50 and beyond. Tandem Press, ISBN 0-908884-83-4
- 1995: I do: 125 years of weddings in New Zealand. Moa Beckett (NZ), ISBN 1-86958-171-7
- 1993: Standing in the sunshine: a history of New Zealand women since they won the vote. Viking, ISBN 0-670-84628-7
- 1993: Unfinished business: what happened to the Cartwright Report? Women's Health Action, Auckland. ISBN 0-473-02018-1
- 1991: The Menopause Industry: How the Medical Establishment Exploits Women. Penguin ISBN 0-89793-161-0 (U.S. Edition 1994)
- 1990: Hysterectomy. Heinemann Reed (NZ), ISBN 0-7900-0089-X
- 1990: Out of the Frying Pan: Inflammatory Writing 1972–89 Penguin ISBN 0-14-012859-X
- 1988: The Unfortunate Experiment: The full story behind the inquiry into cervical cancer treatment. Penguin. ISBN 0-14-011671-0
- 1986: Every girl: a social history of women and the YWCA in Auckland 1885–1985. Auckland YWCA ISBN 0-908636-27-X
