= Joanna Paul =

New Zealand visual artist, poet and film-maker (1945–2003)

- Born: Joanna Margaret Paul; 14 December 1945; Hamilton, New Zealand
- Died: 29 May 2003 (aged 57); Rotorua, New Zealand
- Education: Elam School of Fine Arts
- Known for: Painting, poetry, film
- Relatives: Blackwood Paul (father); Janet Paul (mother)

Joanna Margaret Paul (14 December 1945 – 29 May 2003) was a New Zealand visual artist, poet and film-maker.

== Early life and education ==
Paul was one of four daughters of pioneering New Zealand publisher Blackwood Paul and artist and writer Janet Paul.

Paul attended Samuel Marsden Collegiate School from 1959 until 1962, then the University of Waikato in 1963, studying history, French and English. In 1964, she travelled to London with her family for a year, studying at the Sir John Cass School. On returning to New Zealand, she completed a Bachelor of Arts degree at the University of Auckland in 1968; in 1967 she enrolled at Elam School of Fine Arts, studying under teachers such as Colin McCahon, Greer Twiss and Tom Hutchins, and alongside fellow students Christine Hellyar, Marte Szirmay and Leon Narbey. She graduated with a Diploma of Fine Arts in 1969.

== Career and family ==
After graduating from Elam Paul moved to Dunedin, where in 1971 she married fellow artist Jeffrey Harris. In 1973 Paul and Harris spent a year in Wellington, where their first daughter was born; in 1976 a second daughter was born, who died of a heart defect at the age of eight months. A son was born in 1978 and a fourth child in 1982. Art historian Jill Trevelyan notes that 'Although Paul faced practical difficulties in reconciling the roles of mother and artist, she refused to see them as mutually exclusive. ... Paul was able to turn her domestic situation to her own advantage in her art, as her many tender and exquisite studies of her children attest.' Paul's first solo exhibition was held in 1968. In 1975 she was included in the exhibition Six Women Artists in Christchurch. In the publication accompanying the exhibition she stated:

As a woman painting is not a job, not even a vocation. It is a part of life, subject to the strains, and joys, of domestic life. ... Painting for me as a woman is an ordinary act – about the great meaning in ordinary things.

In 1977, she developed a project called A Season's Diaries in Wellington, which connected a number of female artists including Heather McPherson, Allie Eagle, Gladys Gurney (also known as Saj Gurney), Anna Keir, Bridie Lonie and Marian Evans. It was this project that led Marian Evans, Anna Keir and Bridie Lonie to create the Women's Gallery, which ran from 1980 till 1984, and which featured work by Paul in a number of its exhibitions.

In 1983 Paul received the Frances Hodgkins Fellowship at the University of Otago. The following year, after the end of her marriage, she moved briefly to Wellington and then settled in Whanganui, where she lived for the rest of her life, not discounting time spent working in various New Zealand cities, including a year in Wellington when she held the Rita Angus Residency in 1993.

The first major survey of Paul's work was shown at the Sarjeant Art Gallery in 1989.

In 2003 Paul collapsed while bathing in a thermal pool in the Polynesian Spas in Rotorua. She died in hospital two days later. Jill Trevelyan writes 'An inventory of her studio revealed some 5000 artworks, many of which had never been exhibited, drawings, photographs and films. She also left a body of work as a poet and prose writer, including a wealth of published material.'

Paul's obituary in the New Zealand journal Art New Zealand noted that 'she worked for love-not for money, neither for status nor fame. And so, during her public life as an artist – just on 34 years – Paul existed on the margins of the art world: where she lived, how she practised, and what she believed in.' The obituary also commented on the range of her work and interests: 'painting and drawing, photography, film-making, poetry, publishing, architectural history and critical writing, as well as related commitment to the women's movement, human rights, building preservation, environmental protection and a fierce opposition to laissez-faire genetic engineering.' Photographic historian Peter Ireland, writing on an exhibition of Paul's photographs in 2013, noted

Apart from a few dedicated collectors her work was never much sought after, and for several reasons. It was usually small, often on paper and domestically related. She worked across a range of mediums – painting, drawing, photography, film, poetry, publishing – and in the market’s view that’s not versatility but a perceived lack of focus. And she was her own worst enemy in terms of promotion. Although she exhibited regularly she shied away from any promotional endeavour, and, typically perversely, seemed to actively discourage it.

== Legacy ==
A tribute exhibition, Beauty, Even, was organised by the City Gallery Wellington the following year and toured to other North Island locations. A survey focused on her drawings was organised by the Mahara Gallery on the Kapiti Coast in 2006 and also toured.

The Hocken Collections at the University of Otago staged an exhibition of Paul's work paired with poet Cilla McQueen, Picture/Poem: imagery of Cilla McQueen & Joanna Paul in 2015. The exhibitions focused on works produced in the 1970s and 1980s when the two were resident in Dunedin; most of the works by Paul were drawn from the Hocken's collections.

In early 2015, three of Paul's films featured in a two person exhibition with contemporary artist Ziggy Lever commissioned by Ramp Gallery Hamilton. Curated by Paula Booker and titled 'Thinking Feeling' the moving image exhibition considered the affective dimension of Paul's detailed and often dream-like non-narrative film works. The exhibition occasioned an eponymous catalogue by Ramp Press and also travelled to The Physics Room Contemporary Art Space, Christchurch.

In 2015 Solomon Nagler and Mark Williams curated Six Artists respond to the work of Joanna Margaret Paul, a collection of short films responding to Paul's poems, by artists Nova Paul, Rachel Shearer, Sonya Lacey, Miranda Parkes, Shannon Te Ao and the collective Popular Productions. This programme of work was screened at the Artists' Moving Image Programme of the BFI London Film Festival 2015, where curator Mark Williams also gave presentation about Paul's practice.

Paul's work was included in Fragments of a World: Artists Working in Film and Photography 1973–1987, curated in 2015 by Dr Sandy Callister for the Adam Art Gallery. The exhibition brought together the work of artists (Paul, Alexis Hunter, Jane Campion, Rhonnda Bosworth, Minerva Betts, Popular Productions and Janet Bayly) who early in their careers explored photography and film, from a feminist perspective. The exhibition travelled to Michael Lett Gallery in Auckland in 2016.

In December 2016 film maker and curator Peter Todd, presented a screening of her films Through a Different Lens / Film Work by Joanna Margaret Paul at the Close-Up Film Centre in London. The programme, which had previously screened in New Zealand, would later screen at The Cinema Museum London and in Australia and Europe. Todd wrote an accompanying essay and writer and academic Eleanor Woodhouse would review the programme in her essay The Transcendent and Domestic in Joanna Margaret Paul’s Films. In 2019 New Zealand born artist Kate Davis, Peter Todd, and academic and writer Sarah Neely would present Margaret Tait & Joanna Margaret Paul: People and Places at the Glasgow Film Festival.

A major retrospective exhibition celebrating her career and legacy Joanna Margaret Paul: Imagined in the Context of a Room, was held at Dunedin Public Art Gallery between 7 August - 14 November 2021, Christchurch Art Gallery held Te Puna o Waiwhetū from 4 December 2021 – 13 March 2022 developed by Dunedin Public Art Gallery with project partner Sarjeant Art Gallery Te Whare o Rehua Whanganui. The accompanying illustrated publication features new essays by the exhibition’s curators Lauren Gutsell, Lucy Hammonds and Greg Donson, who were joined in this project by writers Pascal Harris, Emma Bugden, Andrea Bell and Joanna Osborne.

In August 2024, a small book of Paul's artwork and poetry was published, accompanied by an exhibition of her work. The book, Spring in the Parapara was curated by the artist's long-time friend, Bernadette Hall.

== Exhibitions ==
- 1989 Joanna Margaret Paul: Chronicle/Chronology, Sarjeant Gallery
- 1995 The Figured Landscape, City Gallery Wellington
- 2004–2005 Beauty, Even, City Gallery Wellington, Sarjeant Gallery and Rotorua Museum of Art and History
- 2006 Joanna Margaret Paul: Drawing, Mahara Gallery and Whangarei Art Museum
- 2013 Joanna Margaret Paul: Photographs 1976–1985, Robert Heald Gallery, Wellington
- 2015 Picture/Poem: imagery of Cilla McQueen & Joanna Paul, Hocken Library, University of Otago, Dunedin
- 2015 Thinking Feeling: Time-based works by Ziggy Lever and Joanna Margaret Paul, curated by Paula Booker, The Physics Room and RAMP Gallery, Hamilton, New Zealand
- 2015 Lunch Poems: Kate Newby and Joanna Margaret Paul, Hopkinson Mossman, Auckland
- 2017 Not Nostalgia, Bowerbank Ninow, Auckland.
- 2021 Imagined in the Context of a Room, Dunedin Public Art Gallery

== Publications ==
Paul published a number of small chapbooks, in addition to pieces of critical and observational writing in various New Zealand publications.

- Rilke's Life of Mary, 1970
- Unwrapping the Body, Bothwell: Dunedin, 1970
- The Lone Goose, John McIndoe: Dunedin, 1979
- With Mary Paul, Gestures of Prayer, Bothwell: Dunedin, 1981
- As I Sat ..., 1985–1986
- Ago, 1985–1986
- Rose, handprinted by Brendan O'Brien, Rita Angus Cottage, Wellington, 2000
- The Cherry Now, Ferbank Studio: Wellington, 2001
- Forbidden Apple, 2003
