= Ann Richardson (oncologist) =

New Zealand oncologist

Ann Richardson QSO
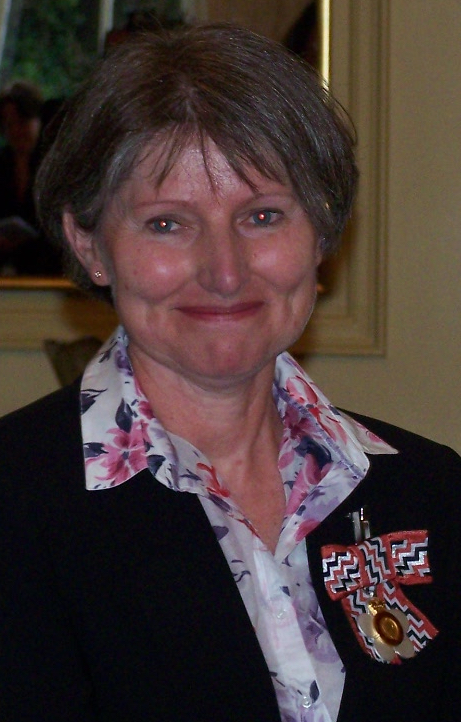
- Richardson in 2008
- Education: University of Otago
- Scientific career
- Fields: Oncology
- Workplaces: University of Canterbury
- Thesis: Evaluation of a pilot breast cancer screening programme (1996)
- Doctoral advisor: J. Mark Elwood; Charlotte Paul
- Website: University of Canterbury profile

Ann Kathleen Richardson QSO is a New Zealand oncologist. She is professor of cancer epidemiology at the University of Canterbury.

== Academic career ==
Richardson did a Bachelor of Medicine and Bachelor of Surgery, a Postgraduate Diploma in Obstetrics and a PhD, all at the University of Otago. She is a Fellow of the New Zealand College of Public Health Medicine. She is on the council of the Health Research Council of New Zealand and a trustee of the Genesis Oncology Trust.

In the 2008 Queen's Birthday Honours, Richardson was appointed a Companion of the Queen's Service Order, for services to public health.

== Selected publications ==
- Cox, B.; Richardson, A.; Graham, P.; Gislefoss, R.E.; Jellum, E.; Rollag, H. (2010). "Breast cancer, cytomegalovirus and Epstein-Barr virus: a nested case-control study". British Journal of Cancer. 102 (11): 1665–1669. doi:10.1038/sj.bjc.6605675. PMC 2883146. PMID 20407437.
