= Geoffrey Rice =

New Zealand historian (born 1946)

Geoffrey Rice ONZM
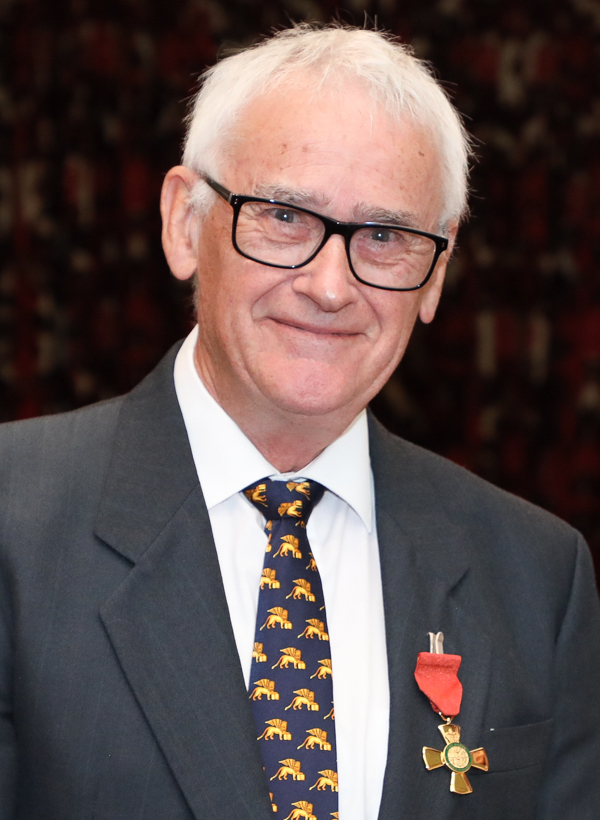
- Rice in 2021
- Born: Geoffrey Wayne Rice; 1946 (age 79–80); Taumarunui, New Zealand
- Known for: Study of Christchurch history and the 1918 Influenza Pandemic
- Title: Emeritus Professor
- Spouse: Edwina Palmer

Academic background
- Education: University of Canterbury
- Thesis: An aspect of European diplomacy in the mid-eighteenth century: the diplomatic career of the fourth Earl of Rochford at Turin, Madrid, and Paris, 1749–1768 (1973)

Academic work
- Discipline: History
- Sub-discipline: Biography and urban history
- Institutions: University of Canterbury

Geoffrey Wayne Rice ONZM (born 1946) is a New Zealand historian. He is an emeritus professor of history at the University of Canterbury, Christchurch. He joined the staff in 1973, and served as head of the School of History from 2006 to 2011, before retiring in 2012.

Rice graduated MA in 1970 and was subsequently the first person to be awarded a history PhD by the University of Canterbury in 1974. He served as the foundation secretary of the New Zealand Historical Association from 1978 to 1981, and was secretary of the Canterbury Historical Association from 1982 to 2007. He has been secretary of the Canterbury History Foundation since 2012. Rice has also been a member of the Royal Society of New Zealand, and is a fellow of the Royal Historical Society, London. He was general editor for the 2nd edition of the Oxford History of New Zealand. Since 1986 he has organised and judged the J. M. Sherrard Award in New Zealand Local and Regional History.

Rice is best known for his detailed studies of the 1918 influenza pandemic and its effect on New Zealand and Japan. His wife, Edwina Palmer, is a Japanologist and some of their work on Japan is published jointly. Rice is known for his studies of the local history of Christchurch. His book Black November (1988; second edition 2005) was the first country-level study of the 1918 influenza pandemic based on individual death records. This book assisted the New Zealand Ministry of Health in preparing its current Influenza Pandemic Plan, and Rice has been invited to give educational presentations on the flu to Ministry of Health staff. Data from his research has been used in several recent epidemiological studies. A condensed and updated version of Black November was published in 2017 as Black Flu 1918: the story of New Zealand’s worst public health disaster.

Rice is also known for his books on Christchurch's history and that of its neighbouring port, Lyttelton. Rice has also written books and articles on the Fourth Earl of Rochford and Heaton Rhodes, as well as some of the Christchurch heritage lost during the 2011 Christchurch earthquake and its aftershocks. His precinct history of Victoria Square, a public space in Christchurch, was published in 2014.

In November 2019 Rice unveiled the 1918 Influenza Pandemic Memorial Plaque at Pukeahu Park alongside the Prime Minister of New Zealand, Jacinda Ardern.

In the 2021 New Year Honours, Rice was appointed an Officer of the New Zealand Order of Merit, for services to historical research and tertiary education.

== Books ==
- Acland: More Than A Surgeon: the Life of Sir Hugh Acland (1874–1956). (Christchurch, Hawthorne Press with The Cotter Medical History Trust, 2026).189pp. ISBN 978-0-473-75688-8
- All Fall Down: Christchurch's Lost Chimneys, (Christchurch:Canterbury University Press, 2011), ISBN 978-1-927145-10-4
- Ambulances and First Aid: St John in Christchurch 1885–1987, (The Order of St John Christchurch, 1994) ISBN 0-473-02517-5
- Black November: The 1918 influenza pandemic in New Zealand, (with assistance from Linda Bryder), (Canterbury University Press, 2005, 2nd edition), ISBN 1-877257-35-4
- Christchurch Changing: An illustrated history, (Canterbury University Press, 1st Ed. 1999, 2nd Ed. 2008) ISBN 978-0-908812-53-0
- Christchurch Crimes 1850 – 75: Scandal and skullduggery in port and town, (Canterbury University Press, 2012) ISBN 978-1-927145-39-5
- Christchurch Crimes and Scandals 1876 – 99, (Canterbury University Press, 2013) ISBN 978-1-927145-51-7
- Christchurch in the Nineties: A Chronology, (Canterbury University Press, 2002) ISBN 0-473-08238-1
- Coward: Christchurch’s Controversial Coroner: the Life of John William Smith Coward (1815-–88). (Christchurch: Hawthorne Press with The Cotter Medical History Trust, 2023). 337 pp. ISBN 978-0-473-68157-9
- Cricketing Colonists: The Brittan Brothers in Early Canterbury, (with assistance from Frances Ryman), (Christchurch: Canterbury University Press, 2015) ISBN 978-1-927145-68-5
- Doctors Divided: Medical Societies in Christchurch, 1865–97 (Christchurch: Hawthorne Press with The Cotter Medical History Trust, 2021), viii + 174 pp. ISBN 978-0-473-60370-0
- Frankish: the Rise and Fall of a Prominent Christchurch Physician: the Life of John David Frankish MD (1842–1913) (Christchurch: Hawthorne Press with the Cotter Medical History Trust, 2022). 232 pp. ISBN 978-0-473-65918-9
- From Sherry to Ginger Kisses and Zoom: The Centennial History of the Canterbury Historical Association, 1922–2022 .(Christchurch: Hawthorne Press, 2022). 154 pp.
- Gifting History: a narrative account of the Canterbury History Foundation’s first 25 years, with introduction by John Cookson (Christchurch, Hawthorne Press, 2024). 68 pp. ISBN 978-0-473-72913-4
- Heaton Rhodes of Otahuna, (Canterbury University Press, 2nd Ed. 2008) ISBN 978-1-877257-65-0
- The Life of the Fourth Earl of Rochford: Eighteenth-century Anglo-Dutch Courtier, Diplomat and Statesman, (Edwin Mellen Press, 2010) ISBN 978-0-7734-1300-9
- The Life of Leslie Averill MD: First into Le Quesnoy: Battles, Babies and Boardrooms with Colin Averill (Christchurch: Dorincourt Press, 2018) ISBN 978-0-473-45269-8
- Lyttelton: Port and Town: an illustrated history, (Canterbury University Press, 2004) ISBN 1-877257-24-9
- Nedwill: That 'Peppery' Irish Surgeon: New Zealand’s Outstanding Public Health Pioneer (Christchurch: Hawthorne Press with The Cotter Medical History Trust, 2022), 356 pp. ISBN 978-0-473-62932-8
- Quackery in Christchurch, 1850–1900: Alternative Remedies and Marginal Practices. (Christchurch: Hawthorne Press with The Cotter Medical History Trust, 2023), 139 pp. ISBN 978-0-473-69370-1
- Rhodes on Cashmere: a history of the Rhodes Memorial Convalescent Home, (Hawthorne Press, 2005) ISBN 0-473-10261-7
- A Scientific Welsh Eye Surgeon: the short life of Llewellyn Powell MD (1843–79), Christchurch’s First Public Health Medical Officer (Christchurch: Hawthorne Press and Cotter Medical History Trust, 2020) ISBN 978-0-473-54361-7
- That Terrible Time: Eye-witness accounts of the 1918 influenza pandemic in New Zealand, (Hawthorne Press, 2018) ISBN 978-0-473-44749-6
- Turnbull: Christchurch’s Radical Doctor: the Life of James Somerville Turnbull MD (1829–1900) (Christchurch: Hawthorne Press with The Cotter Medical History Trust, 2024). 363 pp.
- Victoria Square: Cradle of Christchurch. (Canterbury University Press, 2014). ISBN 978-1-927145-58-6

== Booklets ==
- Why did Wellington suffer nearly double the death-rate of Christchurch in the 1918 influenza pandemic? The 2018 Jim Gardner Memorial Lecture; (Christchurch, Canterbury History Foundation, 2018), 32 pp. ISSN 1176-0443.
- Christchurch’s Sensational Styche Case of 1900: a notable New Zealand Appeals precedent (Christchurch, Hawthorne Press, 2020), 31 pp. ISBN 978-0-473-54544-4
- Wellington’s Mysterious ‘Baron’ Mollwo: the Thalio-Histrionic Elocutionary Lecturer (Christchurch, Hawthorne Press, 2020), 33 pp. ISBN 978-0-473-54525-3
- Surgery in Nineteenth Century Christchurch, New Zealand, 1850–1900 (Christchurch, Hawthorne Press & Cotter Medical History Trust, 2020), 38 pp. ISBN 978-0-473-54453-9
- Chemists and Druggists in Early Christchurch and Lyttelton, 1850s to 1880s (Christchurch, Hawthorne Press & Cotter Medical History Trust, 2020), 22 pp. ISBN 978-0-473-54460-7
- The Christchurch Trials and Tribulations of Dr Adam Mickle, 1890–91 (Christchurch, Hawthorne Press, 2020), 15 pp. ISBN 978-0-473-54646-5
- Christchurch’s Curious Coccyx Case of 1899: Dr Arthur De Renzi’s surgery on Mrs Sarah Walmsley (Christchurch, Hawthorne Press, 2020), 25 pp. ISBN 978-0-473-55186-5
- The Notorious Dr Russell of Tristram House: an American Creole abortionist in Christchurch, New Zealand, 1880–1915 (Christchurch, Hawthorne Press, 2020), 67 pp. ISBN 978-0-473-55046-2
- Gastro-enteritis or Typhoid? The Christchurch Hospital Inquiry of 1880 (Christchurch, Hawthorne Press & The Cotter Medical History Trust, 2021), 31 pp. ISBN 978-0-473-57211-2
- The Unfortunate Dr Campbell of Lyttelton and Christchurch: the Life of Donald Campbell, LM, LRCS, LRCP (1844–81) and his Tragic End (Christchurch: Hawthorne Press & The Cotter Medical History Trust, 2021), 63 pp. ISBN 978-0-473-57321-8
- Clean and Decent in Christchurch, New Zealand: Personal and Public Hygiene, 1850–1900 (Christchurch: Hawthorne Press & The Cotter Medical History Trust, 2021), 77 pp. ISBN 978-0-473-57806-0
- Breweries in Early Christchurch, New Zealand, 1853–1923 (Christchurch, Hawthorne Press, 2021).16 pp. ISBN 978-0-473-59321-6
- A Fatal Herniotomy and the Medical Libel Case of 1886: Dr Nedwill’s pursuit of Dr McBean Stewart (Christchurch: Hawthorne Press & The Cotter Medical History Trust, 2021), 62 pp. ISBN 978-0-473-59377-3
- When Doctors Differ: The 1895 Christchurch Hospital Inquiry and the 1896 ousting of Dr John Murray-Aynsley (Christchurch, Hawthorne Press & The Cotter Medical History Trust, 2022). 81 pp. ISBN 978-0-473-61856-8
- The Lost Angel of Canterbury College: A Personal Reminiscence (Christchurch, Hawthorne Press, 2023), 55 pp. ISBN 978-0-473-69906-2
- Illness and Loss: the Sad History of Christchurch General Practitioner Samuel Alexander Patrick MD (1836–1894). (Christchurch, Hawthorne Press with The Cotter Medical History Trust, 2025). 71pp. ISBN 978-0-473-74071-9
- Bold and Offensive: the Repeated Misdeeds of an Alcoholic Prostitute in Nineteenth-Century Christchurch, New Zealand: Mary Ann Robinson (Christchurch, Hawthorne Press, 2025). 21pp. ISBN 978-0-473-77170-6
