= Graham Liggins =

New Zealand physician (1926–2010)

Sir Graham Liggins CBE FRS FRSNZ
- Portrait by Bruce Jarvis
- Born: Graham Collingwood Liggins; 24 June 1926; Thames, New Zealand
- Died: 24 August 2010 (aged 84)
- Known for: Obstetrics

Sir Graham Collingwood "Mont" Liggins CBE FRS FRSNZ (24 June 1926 – 24 August 2010) was a New Zealand medical scientist. A specialist in obstetrical research, he is best known for his pioneering use of hormone injections (antenatal steroids) in 1972 to accelerate the lung growth of premature babies. This made it possible for many preterm babies with lung problems to survive.

== Early life and education ==
Liggins was born in 1926 in Thames; his father was a doctor. He attended Thames High School and Auckland Grammar School. He graduated with his medical degree from the University of Otago in 1949 and a Diploma in Obstetrics from the RCOG in London the following year. In 1969 he graduated with a PhD at the University of Auckland. His doctoral thesis was titled The Role of the foetal adrenal glands in the mechanism of initiation of parturition in the ewe.

== Career ==
Liggins worked as an obstetrician at National Women's Hospital in Auckland from the late 1950s where he carried out research into the reduction of death rates of premature babies.

In 1971 he took up a chair as professor of obstetrics and gynaecological endocrinology at the University of Auckland. In 1972, following a trial of pre-natal corticosteroids, he published his study which established that hormone treatment could improve lung development and prevent respiratory distress syndrome in premature babies.

== Honours and awards ==
Liggins was awarded the Polar Medal for Antarctic research in 1980. In the 1983 Queen's Birthday Honours, Liggins was appointed a Commander of the Order of the British Empire for services to medical research. He was made a Knight Bachelor, also for services to medical research, in the 1991 Queen's Birthday Honours.

== Death and legacy ==
Liggins died on 24 August 2010, aged 84, following a long illness. The Liggins Institute at the University of Auckland Faculty of Medical and Health Sciences was named in his honour and opened by the Queen in 2002. It was founded by Peter Gluckman who described Liggins as New Zealand's greatest ever medical scientist saying he "showed the importance of serendipity in clinical science, and the importance of moving rapidly to application."

== Selected publications ==
- Falke, K.J.; Busch, T.; Hoffmann, O.; Liggins, G.C.; Liggins, J.; Mohnhaupt, R.; Roberts, J.D.; Stanek, K.; Zapol, W.M. (2008). "Breathing pattern, CO2 elimination and the absence of exhaled NO in freely diving Weddell seals". Respiratory Physiology & Neurobiology. 162 (1): 85–92. doi:10.1016/j.resp.2008.04.007.
- Harding, Jane E.; Pang, Jia-Min; Knight, David B.; Liggins, Graham C. (2001). "Do antenatal corticosteroids help in the setting of preterm rupture of membranes?". American Journal of Obstetrics and Gynecology. 184 (2): 131–139. doi:10.1067/mob.2001.108331.
- Liggins, G.C. (1994). "Mechanisms of the Onset of Labour: The New Zealand Perspective". Australian and New Zealand Journal of Obstetrics and Gynaecology. 34 (3): 338–342. doi:10.1111/j.1479-828X.1994.tb01085.x. ISSN 0004-8666.
- Liggins, GC (1994). "The role of cortisol in preparing the fetus for birth". Reproduction, Fertility and Development. 6 (2): 141. doi:10.1071/RD9940141. ISSN 1031-3613.
- Liggins, G. C. (1990). "Obstetric and paediatric collaboration to reduce morbidity after preterm birth". BJOG: An International Journal of Obstetrics & Gynaecology. 97 (1): 1–3. doi:10.1111/j.1471-0528.1990.tb01708.x. ISSN 1470-0328.
- Liggins, G.C. (1989). "Can the benefits of antepartum corticosteroid treatment be improved?". European Journal of Obstetrics & Gynecology and Reproductive Biology. 33 (1): 25–30. doi:10.1016/0028-2243(89)90074-9.
- Schellenberg, Jean-Claude; Liggins, Graham C. (1987). "New approaches to hormonal acceleration of fetal lung maturation". Journal of Perinatal Medicine. 15 (5): 447–452. doi:10.1515/jpme.1987.15.5.447. ISSN 0300-5577.
- Liggins, G. C.; Howie, R. N. (1 October 1972). "A CONTROLLED TRIAL OF ANTEPARTUM GLUCOCORTICOID TREATMENT FOR PREVENTION OF THE RESPIRATORY DISTRESS SYNDROME IN PREMATURE INFANTS". Pediatrics. 50 (4): 515–525. doi:10.1542/peds.50.4.515. ISSN 0031-4005.
