= Sonya Lacey =

New Zealand artist (born 1976)

Sonya Lacey (born December 1976) is a New Zealand artist based in Wellington. She works with a range of mediums including performance, video and installation. Her works are in the collection of the Auckland Art Gallery Toi o Tāmaki.

== Early life ==
Lacey was born in 1976 in Hastings, New Zealand.

== Education ==
Lacey graduated from the Elam School of Fine Arts in Auckland with a MFA in 2007.

== Career ==
Lacey's artistic works demonstrate an interest in forms of communication. Her work has been curated into programmes at institutions including the Singapore Centre for Contemporary Art, the London International Film Festival, and the Govett Brewster Art Gallery. Together with Sarah Rose, Lacey established the collaborative research project lightreading.

Notable solo exhibitions:

- Making things clear at The Physics Room, Christchurch, 2010.
- Dilutions and Infinitesimals at The Physics Room, Christchurch, 2016. For this show, Lacey produced works using an original typeface, alongside a video installation, with an imagined narrative drawing the two parts of the exhibition together.
- Dilutions: Three short films by Sonya Lacey at the Centre for Contemporary Arts, Glasgow, 2016. This exhibition presented three of Lacey's short films – Infinitesimals (2016), By Sea (2015), and Newspaper for Vignelli (2010).
- Smooth but coarser than yellow at Robert Heald Gallery, Wellington, 2017.
- Speed Reading at NTU CCA, Singapore, 2017.
- Newspaper for Vignelli at Dunedin Public Art Gallery, Dunedin, 2019. This exhibition reflected Lacey's interest in different printing histories across time, and looked to the work of Italian designer Massimo Vignelli and his proposed redesign of The European Journal (c.1978) for inspiration.

== Awards and residencies ==
- Awarded residency at the Banff Centre, Canada in 2012.
- Awarded residency at the Centre for Contemporary Art Singapore in 2017. During this residency, Lacey developed a project titled One divides into two, which derives its title from a Maoist slogan from the 1960s. This project expanded Lacey's investigations into non-western print histories.
