= Blackwood Paul =

David Blackwood Paul (1908–1965) was a New Zealand bookseller and publisher. He was born in Auckland, New Zealand, in 1908. He was married to Janet Paul and they had a publishing business together specialising in New Zealand poetry. Their publishing firm was sold to Longman in 1967, and continued publishing as Longman Paul until 1972. Janet and Blackwood Paul had four daughters, one of whom, Joanna Margaret Paul, became a well-known New Zealand artist, poet, publisher and film-maker.
