= New Genetics and Society =

- Discipline: Genetics; Sociology of science
- Language: English
- Edited by: Richard Tutton; Adam Hedgecoe

Publication details
- History: 1999–present
- Publisher: Routledge
- Frequency: Triannual
- Impact factor: 1.571 (2017)

Standard abbreviations
- ISO 4: New Genet. Soc.

Indexing
- CODEN: NGSOFI
- ISSN: 1463-6778 (print); 1469-9915 (web)
- OCLC no.: 920397691

Links
- Journal homepage; Online access; Online archive

New Genetics and Society is a triannual peer-reviewed scientific journal covering sociological perspectives on contemporary genetics and related biological sciences. It was established in 1999 by Peter Glasner and Harry Rothman, with its first issue appearing in April of that year. It is published by Routledge and the editors-in-chief are Richard Tutton (Lancaster University) and Adam Hedgecoe (University of Cardiff). According to the Journal Citation Reports, the journal has a 2017 impact factor of 1.571.
