= Royal Australian and New Zealand College of Obstetricians and Gynaecologists =

Professional organization in Australia and New Zealand

- Abbreviation: RANZCOG
- Formation: 1998
- Merger of: The Royal Australian College of Obstetricians and Gynaecologists (RACOG) & The Royal New Zealand College of Obstetricians and Gynaecologists (RNZCOG)
- Type: Non-profit organization
- Purpose: Obstetrics and Gynaecology
- Headquarters: Melbourne, Australia
- Location: Australia
- Region served: Australia & New Zealand
- Official language: English
- President: Dr Gillian Gibson
- Website: https://ranzcog.edu.au

The Royal Australian and New Zealand College of Obstetricians and Gynaecologists (RANZCOG) is a not-for-profit organisation dedicated to the establishment of high standards of practice in obstetrics and gynaecology and women's health. The College has a strong focus on women's health advocacy and trains and accredits doctors throughout Australia and New Zealand in the specialties of obstetrics and gynaecology. Its head office is in Melbourne, Australia. It was founded in 1998, with the amalgamation of the Australian and New Zealand organisations.

== History ==
=== New Zealand ===
In 1926 Dr Doris Gordon proposed setting up the New Zealand Obstetrical Society. This was achieved in 1927 with Gordon as its secretary. The aim of the Society was to improve maternity care in New Zealand and to advocate for better training in obstetrics by establishing a Chair of Obstetrics at the University of Otago and later a Postgraduate Chair in Obstetrics in Auckland. The Obstetrical Society became the New Zealand Obstetrical and Gynaecological Society (NZOGS) in 1935. In 1982 a Royal New Zealand College of Obstetrics and Gynaecology was formed which then amalgamated with the Australian organisation in 1998 to create RANZCOG.

== Membership ==
As of 2018, the College had 2,211 Fellows in Australia and New Zealand; 277 subspecialists, and 2,549 Associate Members (including previous Diplomates).

There are six categories of membership:

- Fellows
- Subspecialists
- Certificants, Associate Procedural and Advanced Procedural Members (including previous Diplomates)
- Honorary Fellows – 37 honorary fellowships have been awarded
- Associate Members – Open to medical practitioners with specialist qualifications in obstetrics and gynaecology not awarded by RANZCOG
- Educational Affiliates – Open to medical practitioners in women's health who are not eligible for Associate Membership

The College is a non-government body, and is also independent of universities.

== Fellowship Training Program ==
The RANZCOG training program is a six-year structured post-graduate program which leads to certification as a Fellow of RANZCOG (FRANZCOG). FRANZCOG status is the only post-graduate qualification which leads to recognition as a specialist obstetrician & gynaecologist in Australia and New Zealand.

The FRANZCOG specialist training program comprises the Core Training Program (first four years), and the Advanced Training Program (a further two years).

Fellows of the College work in the public and private health system, in hospitals and clinics; they teach and undertake research, in universities and in clinical settings; they work collaboratively with other healthcare organisations and government bodies to ensure that women and their families have access to quality care; and many Fellows do extensive pro bono work for the College and the community.

== Certificate and Associate Training Programs ==
The college offers training in Women’s Health for general practitioners at three levels:

- Certificate of Women’s Health
- RANZCOG Associate Training Program (Procedural) - Formerly Diploma of the RANZCOG (DRANZCOG)
- RANZCOG Associate Training Program (Adv. Procedural) - formerly Advanced Diploma of the RANZCOG (DRANZCOG Advanced)

== Subspecialties ==
There are five subspecialties:

- Gynaecological oncology
- Maternal–fetal medicine
- Reproductive endocrinology and infertility
- Ultrasound
- Urogynaecology
