= David Skegg =

New Zealand epidemiologist (b. 1947)

Sir David Skegg KNZM OBE FRSNZ
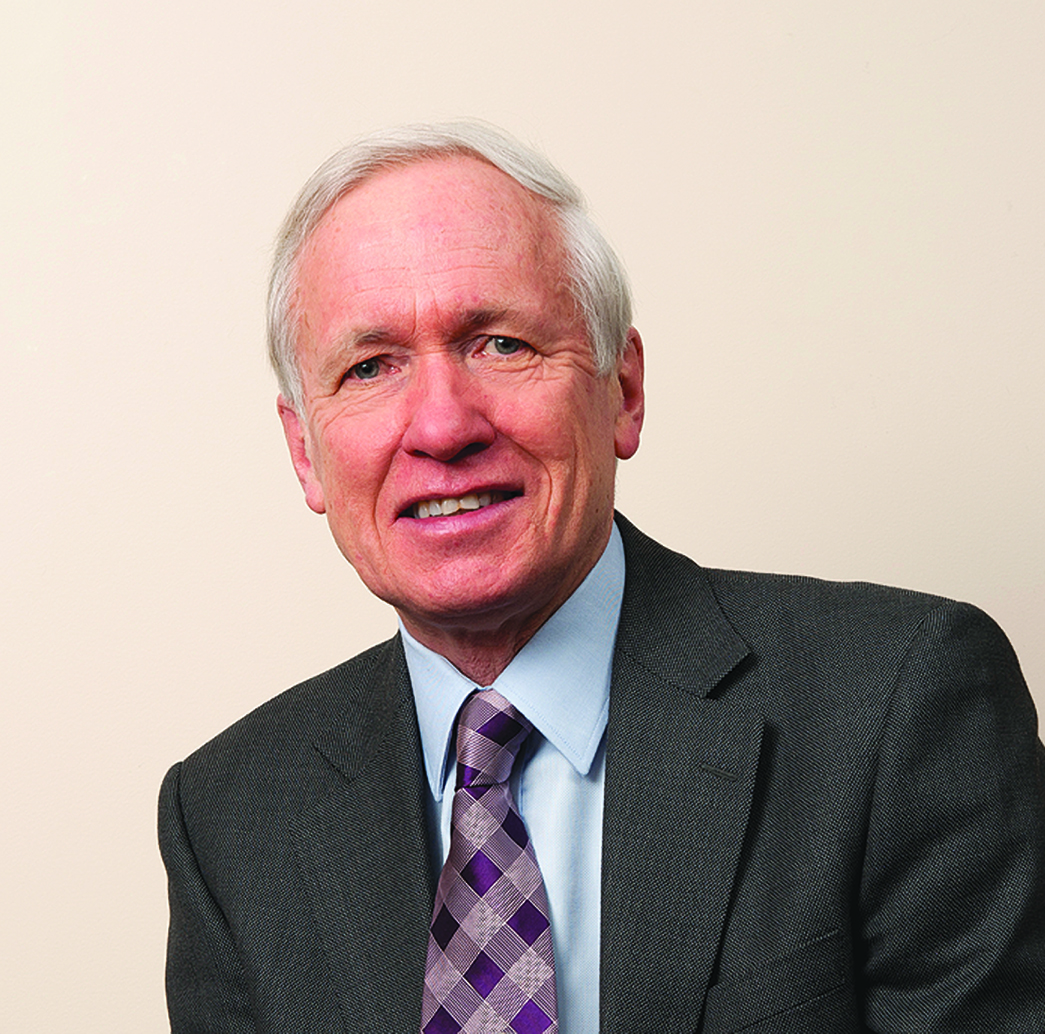
- Skegg in 2010
- Born: David Christopher Graham Skegg; 16 December 1947 (age 78); Auckland, New Zealand
- Education: University of Otago; University of Oxford; Balliol College
- Scientific career
- Fields: Epidemiology
- Workplaces: University of Otago
- Doctoral students: Lianne Parkin

Sir David Christopher Graham Skegg KNZM OBE FRSNZ (born 16 December 1947) is a New Zealand epidemiologist and university administrator. He is an emeritus professor in the Department of Preventive and Social Medicine at the University of Otago. He was the vice-chancellor of the university from 2004 to 2011 and president of the Royal Society of New Zealand from 2012 to 2015. His primary research interest is cancer epidemiology.

== Biography ==
Skegg was born in Auckland and attended King's College, Auckland. He entered the medical course at the University of Otago, travelling on exchange to Harvard University. He later received a (postgraduate) Rhodes Scholarship to the University of Oxford, joining Balliol College and working with noted epidemiologist Sir Richard Doll.

Returning to Otago, Skegg took up the departmental chair in Preventive and Social Medicine in 1980. He was the vice-chancellor of the university from 2004 to 2011. He was president of the Royal Society of New Zealand from July 2012 to 2015.

Skegg has acted as a consultant to the World Health Organization and to the New Zealand Government. He chaired the Health Research Council, the Science Board, and the Public Health Commission. In the 1991 New Year Honours, he was appointed an Officer of the Order of the British Empire, for services to medicine, and in the 2009 New Year Honours, he was appointed a Distinguished Companion of the New Zealand Order of Merit, also for services to medicine. Later in 2009, he accepted re-designation as a Knight Companion following the restoration of titular honours by the New Zealand Government. He has contributed to the study of cervical, breast and prostate cancer, as well as contraceptives and reproductive health.

During the COVID-19 pandemic in New Zealand, Skegg was an adviser to the International Science Council and the Epidemic Response Committee of the New Zealand Parliament. He also chaired the Strategic Covid-19 Public Health Advisory Group, which advised the New Zealand Government on its response to the pandemic. In that capacity, he has advocated an elimination approach to containing the pandemic until an effective vaccination programme could be rolled out. Under his leadership, the Committee advocated a phased approach towards reopening the country's borders, easing managed isolation requirements for certain travellers, and introducing pre-departure and rapid testing for travellers exiting and entering the country.

Notable doctoral students of Skegg's include Lianne Parkin.

Professional and academic associations
Preceded by Garth Carnaby	President of the Royal Society of New Zealand; 2012–2015	Succeeded by Richard Bedford
