= Phillida Bunkle =

New Zealand politician

The Honourable Phillida Bunkle
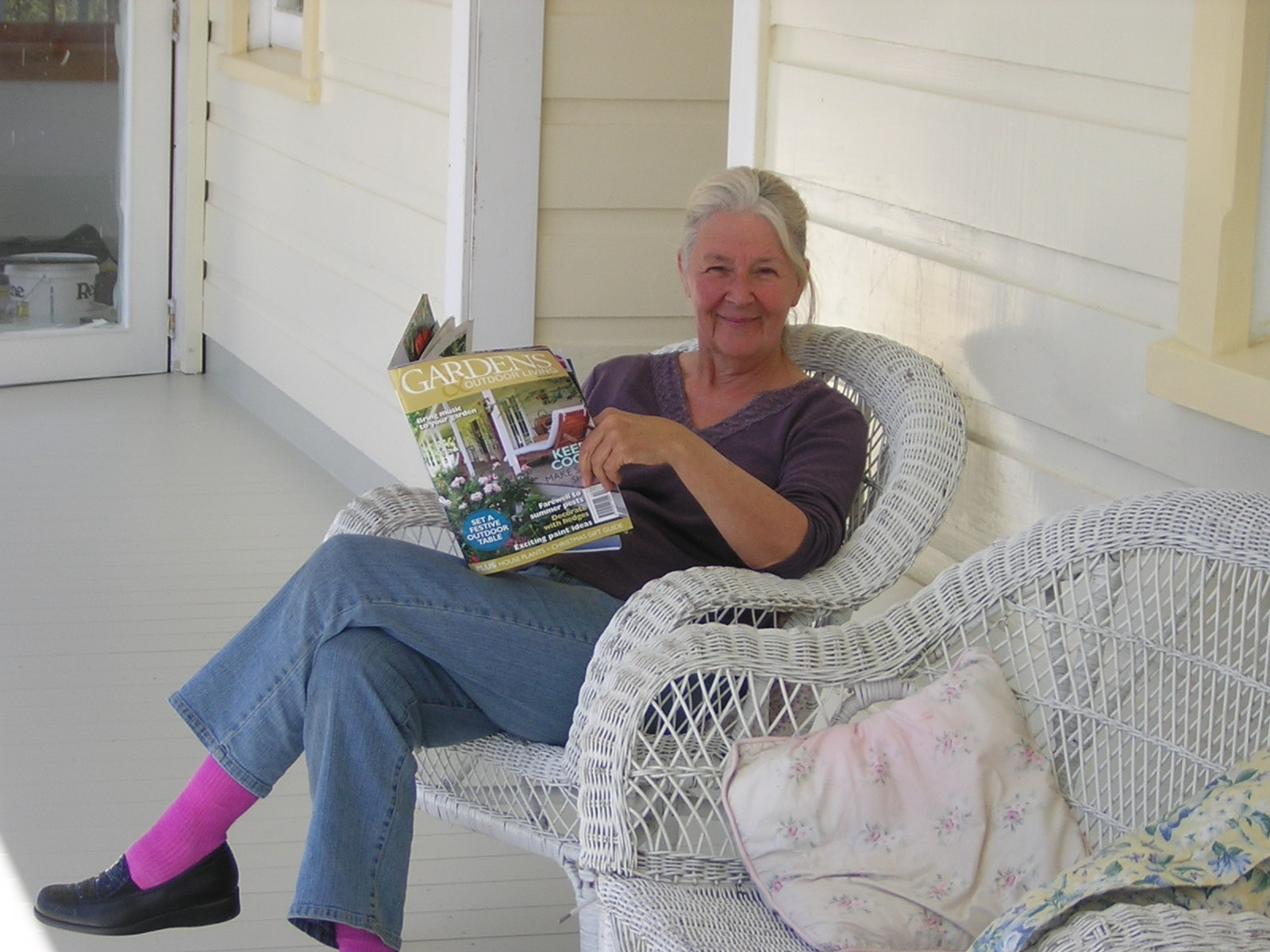

Member of the New Zealand Parliament for Alliance list
- In office 12 December 1996 – 11 June 2002

Personal details
- Born: 1944 (age 81–82) Sussex, England
- Party: Alliance
- Other political affiliations: Green (1992–97)
- Spouse: Jock Phillips (div. 1993)
- Education: Keele University; Smith College; Victoria University

Phillida Bunkle (born 1944) is a former New Zealand politician. She represented the Alliance in Parliament from 1996 to 2002, when she retired. Bunkle was for many years a lecturer at Victoria University.

== Early life ==
Bunkle was born in Sussex, England, and was educated at Keele University, England, receiving a BA with First Class Honours; Smith College, Massachusetts, USA, receiving a MA; and St Anne's College, Oxford. She attended Harvard University, USA as a Kennedy Scholar and was the recipient of a Fulbright Award.

== Life before politics ==
Bunkle lectured in history at Victoria University of Wellington. In 1975, she founded the Women's Studies programme (later department), the first of its kind at a New Zealand university. She taught at the university until her election to Parliament in 1996.

She was married for many years to Jock Phillips, a university colleague and noted historian. The couple divorced in 1993, before Bunkle was elected to Parliament.

Her position at the forefront of the women’s health movement was established when Bunkle researched and published, with Sandra Coney, An Unfortunate Experiment at National Women's Hospital, a piece which documented that women with cervical cancer had unwittingly been used as experimental research subjects at New Zealand's leading women's hospital. The original article has been reprinted numerous times. For their work Coney and Bunkle were awarded the National Humanist's Society Supreme Human Rights Award, the Supreme Media Women’s Award and the Governor General's Special Award for Excellence in Journalism.

== Political career ==
New Zealand Parliament
Years	Term	Electorate	List	Party
1996–1999	45th	List	9	Alliance
1999–2002	46th	List	5	Alliance

Bunkle joined the Green Party (then a participatory member of the Alliance) in 1992, and unsuccessfully stood as an Alliance candidate in the 1993 election in Onslow, placing third. In 1995 she ran as the Alliance candidate for mayor of Wellington, placing a distant sixth. In the 1996 election, she was elected to Parliament as a list MP, sitting as a member of the Alliance. When the Green Party left the Alliance, Bunkle opted not to follow them. After the 1999 election, in which Bunkle was re-elected, she became a Minister outside of Cabinet in the new Labour-Alliance coalition government, serving as Minister of Customs and Minister of Consumer Affairs.

Bunkle took a strong anti-gambling stance, being patron of Compulsive Gambling Society Incorporated and introducing a Bill to restrict gambling.

She resigned these roles after a controversy surrounding her claims for a residential allowance, although she was later cleared of any deliberate wrongdoing. When the Alliance began to collapse in 2002, Bunkle sided with Jim Anderton's faction, but decided not to seek re-election.

In 2020, Bunkle wrote an essay for Newsroom about her time in politics, in which she alleged that bullying, factional power-play and misuse of funding had been commonplace in the Alliance, and that this was an example of an abusive culture throughout Parliament that persists to the present.

== Life after Parliament ==
After leaving parliament at the 2002 general election, Bunkle worked overseas, including in China as a women's studies teacher and in Britain where she completed an MSc in integrated health.

In 2003 Bunkle was appointed as a member of the Alcohol Advisory Council of New Zealand. She served two months before resigning her membership, citing her relocation to the United Kingdom as her reason for her resignation.

In 2007 she was charged with theft after allegedly shoplifting a bottle of wine and two packets of coffee from a supermarket in Paraparaumu. She pleaded guilty and was given diversion.

== Selected works ==
- Phillida Bunkle, Women in higher education; presented on behalf of the Interuniversity Committee for Sex Equality in Education (SEE) (Wellington: New Zealand Parliament, Select Committee on Women's Rights, 1974).
- Phillida Bunkle; Stephen I Levine; and Christopher J Wainwright, Learning about sexism in New Zealand (Wellington: Learmonth Publications, 1976).
- Phillida Bunkle and Beryl Hughes, eds. Women in New Zealand Society (Auckland: George Allen & Unwin, 1980).

Phillida Bunkle, “The Origins of the Women's Movement in New Zealand: The Women's Christian Temperance Union, 1885–1895,” 52–76.

- Phillida Bunkle, "Calling the shots? The international politics of depo-provera" 165–177 in Test-tube women: what future for motherhood? Rita Arditti; Renate Klein; and, Shelley Minden, eds. (London/Boston: Pandora Press, 1984).
- Phillida Bunkle, New Zealand women 1985–1995: markets and inequality; an assessment of the impact of market policies on the position of women (Wellington: Victoria Univ. of Wellington, 1996).
- Robin Hyde; Phillida Bunkle; Linda Hardy; and, Jacqueline Matthews, Nor the years condemn (Auckland: New Women's Press, 1986).
- Phillida Bunkle and Sandra Coney, Submission from Fertility Action to the Committee for Inquiry into the Treatment of Cervical Cancer at National Women's Hospital (Wellington: Fertility Action, 1987).
- Sandra Coney and Phillida Bunkle An unfortunate experiment at National Women's (Auckland metro, June 1987).
- Phillida Bunkle, Second opinion: the politics of women's health in New Zealand (Auckland: Oxford Univ. Press, 1988).
- Phillida Bunkle, Across the counter: the lives of the working poor in New Zealand 1990: report of the Second New Zealand Sweating Commission (Wellington: The Second New Zealand Sweating Commission, 1990).
- Phillida Bunkle, "Economy: restructuring and growth," in New Zealand in crisis, eds. David Novitz and W E Willmott (Wellington: GP Publications, 1992).
- Rosemary Du Plessis and Phillida Bunkle, Feminist voices: women's studies texts for Aotearoa/New Zealand (Auckland: Oxford University Press, 1992).
- Amanda Craig and Phillida Bunkle, Neither freedom nor choice: report (Palmerston North, N.Z.: The People's Select Committee, 1992).
- Rosemarie Smith; Phillida Bunkle; and, Jenny Matthews. 1993 Suffrage Centennial local history project: research guide (Wellington: Victoria University of Wellington, Faculty of Arts, Women's Studies, 1993).

== Bibliography ==
- Bunkle, Phillida; Lepper, John (March 2004). "What Do We Know About Gambling In New Zealand?". Social Policy Journal of New Zealand (21).

Political offices
Preceded by John Luxton	Minister of Customs; 1999–2001	Succeeded by Jim Anderton
