= National Women's Hospital =

Former public hospital in Auckland, New Zealand

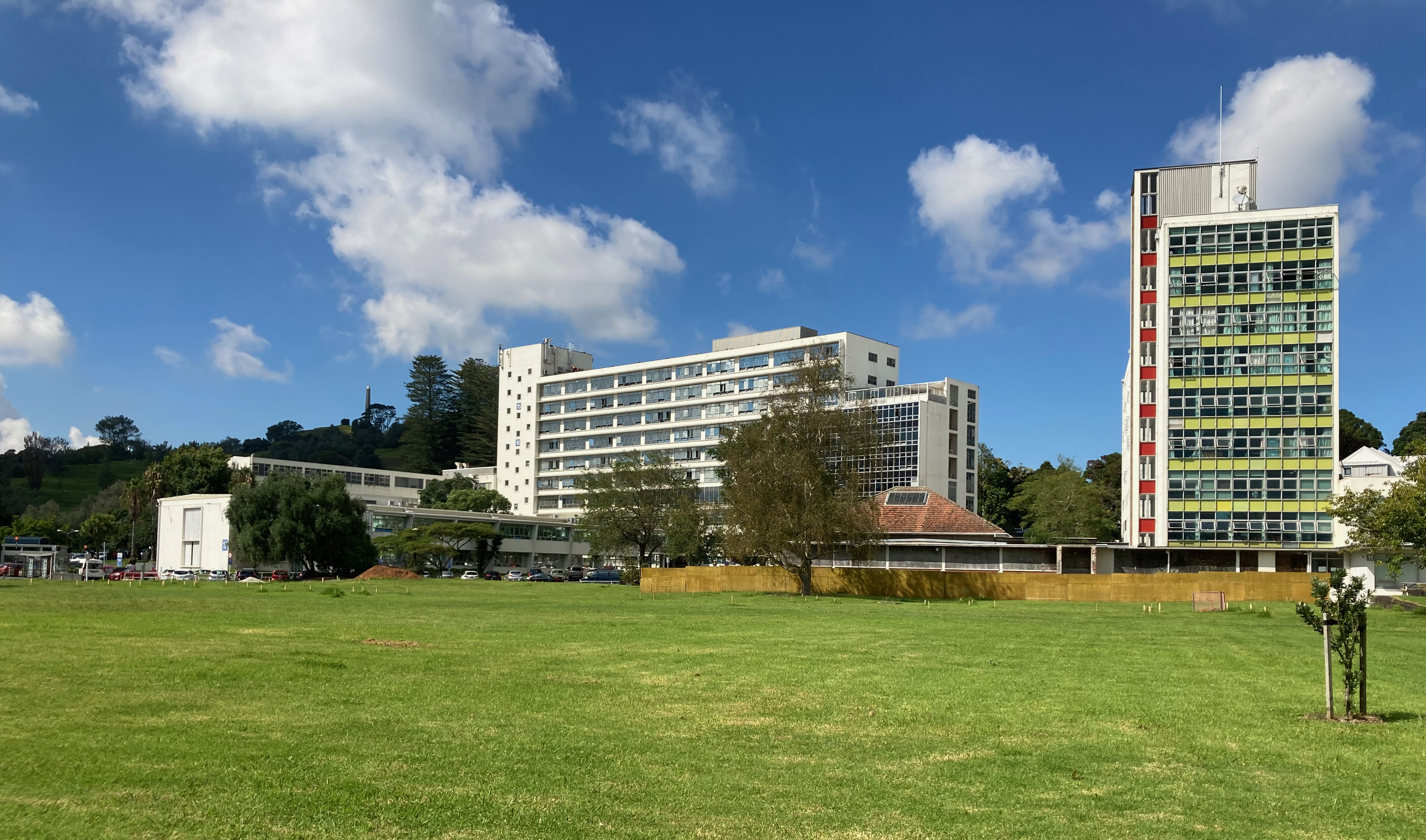
- National Women's buildings in 2023 - hospital building (left) nurse's home (right)

Geography
- Location: Greenlane, Auckland, New Zealand
- Coordinates: 36.895194°S 174.779436°E

Organisation
- Type: Specialist

Services
- Speciality: Obstetrics and gynaecology

History
- Opened: 1964
- Closed: 2004

Links
- Website: www.adhb.health.nz
- Lists: Hospitals in New Zealand

National Women's Hospital, founded in 1955, was a public hospital specialising in obstetrics and gynaecology in Auckland, New Zealand. Initially located in Cornwall Hospital it moved to a purpose built building adjacent to Green Lane Hospital (now Greenlane Clinical Centre) and Cornwall Park from 1964. In 2004 its services moved to Auckland City Hospital.

== History ==
In the 1940s a group of prominent doctors campaigned to establish an obstetrical and gynaecological hospital in Auckland which could also offer post-graduate teaching in these specialties. These doctors included Doris Gordon, Douglas Robb, John Stallworthy and Robert Macintosh. Up until that time St Helens Hospital had provided maternity services since 1906. More maternity beds were required and fundraising took place for new facilities and an academic chair in Obstetrics and Gynaecology. The Obstetrical and Gynaecological Hospital opened at Cornwall Hospital in 1946 and the first baby was born there on 9 June 1946. The hospital was renamed National Women's Hospital in 1955.

Although the government had approved the construction of an obstetric hospital in 1943 it was subject to post-war delays and construction of a new building and a nurse's home adjacent to Green Lane Hospital did not commence until 1958. The government financed two thirds of the cost recognising that the hospital would provide a national service.

The hospital was opened in 1964 in two separate ceremonies. On 2 February the hospital was blessed by the Bishop of Auckland, the Rt. Rev. E.A. Gowing, followed by an official opening on 14 February by the Governor General Sir Bernard Fergusson. The opening was to have been performed by Queen Elizabeth The Queen Mother but she was unable to attend due to illness.

The building was 12 storeys high with 162 obstetric beds, 74 gynaecological beds, and isolation block, facilities to care for 54 premature babies and a research unit.

A research centre for the Auckland University Post-graduate School of Obstetrics and Gynaecology at National Women's opened in 1990.

In 1990 all the services provided at St Helens were moved to National Women's where obstetric and gynaecological services were separated.

The hospital closed in 2004 when all services were moved to Auckland City Hospital. The buildings are now part of the Greenlane Clinical Centre.

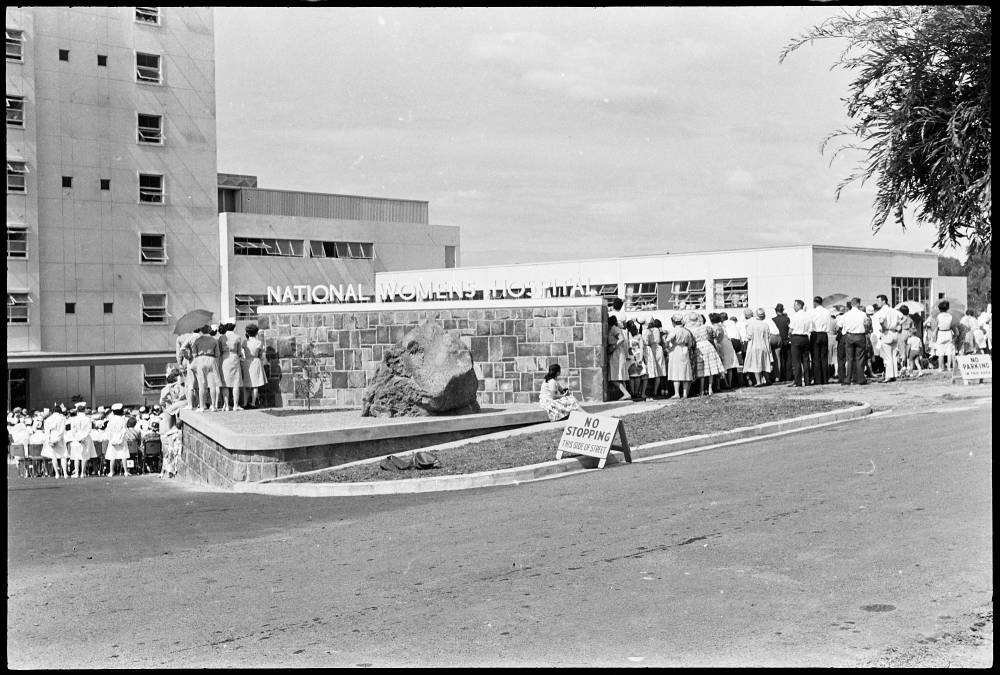
Opening of the National Women's Hospital, 1964

== Cartwright Inquiry ==
From 1987 to 1988 an inquiry was carried out by judge Silvia Cartwright into the management and treatment of women with cervical cancer at the hospital.

== Achievements ==
William Liley carried out the first pre-birth blood transfusion of Rh negative blood to Rh positive babies with Rh negative mothers. The first In vitro fertilisation (IVF) treatment in New Zealand was carried out at National Women's in 1983.

The Liggins Institute at the University of Auckland is named after medical scientist Graham Liggins.

== Notable staff ==
- Herb Green
- Graham Liggins
- William Liley
- Ron Jones
