= List of New Zealand women photographers =

This is a list of women photographers who were born in New Zealand or whose works are closely associated with that country:

== B ==
- Bobbie Barwell (born Mildred Annie Hickman; 1895–1985), photographer in Ashburton
- Janet Bayly (born 1955), photographer, curator and gallery director
- Rhondda Bosworth (born 1944), photographer and artist
- Alice Brusewitz (1858–1927), commercial photographer
- Jessie Buckland (1878–1939), photographer and studio owner

== C ==
- Norah Carter (1881–1966), studios in Christchurch and Gisborne
- Gillian Chaplin (born 1948), photographic artist and curator
- Fiona Clark (born 1954), photographer
- Emily Florence Cazneau (c. 1861–1892), Wellington photographer
- Harriet Sophia Cobb (1855–1929), Hawkes Bay photographer and studio owner
- Norah Carter (1881–1966), New Zealand photographer, photographic studio owner and painter

== D ==
- Judy Darragh (born 1957), sculptor, assemblage artist, photographer, painter
- Eileen Olive Deste (1908–1986), British-born New Zealand photographer

== F ==
- Nellie Ferner (1869–1930), artist, photographer, community leader
- Rosaline Margaret Frank (1864–1954), early female photographer
- Marti Friedlander (1928–2016), Jewish immigrant, social activist, photographed children and Maori women

== G ==
- Eunice Harriett Garlick (1883–1951), landscapes and Maori studies
- Elizabeth Greenwood (1873–1961), Wellington photographer

== H ==
- Gil Hanley (born 1934), photographer
- Amy Merania Harper (1900–1998), studio in Auckland, portraitist
- Louisa M. Herrmann (1864-1955), studio in Cuba Street, Wellington, photographer
- Alexis Hunter (1948–2014), contemporary painter, photographer, based in London
- Alyson Hunter (born 1948), photographer and print maker based in London

== J ==
- Megan Jenkinson (born 1958), photographer

== K ==
- Thelma Rene Kent (1899–1946), early female photographer
- Marion Kirker (1879–1971), New Zealand photographer

== L ==
- Eliza Elizabeth Leaf (c. 1818 – 1908), New Zealand photographer

== M ==
- Ruth McDowall (born 1984), photographer, photojournalist, educator, working in central Nigeria
- May and Mina Moore (1881–1931, 1882–1957), photographer
- Margaret Moth (1951–2010), photojournalist with CNN

== N ==
- Robina Nicol (1861–1942), photographer
- Anne Noble (born 1954), series related to religion and family members

== P ==
- Fiona Pardington (born 1961), artistic photographer, educator
- Elizabeth Pulman (1836–1900), New Zealand's first female photographer, studio in Auckland

== S ==
- Marie Shannon (born 1960), photographer and educator
- Ann Shelton (born 1967), photojournalist, fine arts photographer, educator

== T ==
- Roberta Thornley (born 1985), portraits from Rwanda
- Yvonne Todd (born 1973), contemporary photographer
- Mabel Tustin (1884–1967), photographer and studio owner

== U ==
- Jane Ussher (born 1953), portraitist, images of Antarctica

== W ==
- Felicia Walmsley (1895–1971), photographer and doctor
- Christine Webster (born 1958), visual artist and photographer
- Ans Westra (1936–2023), Dutch-born New Zealand studio and documentary photographer, Māori images
- Margaret Matilda White (1868–1910), Irish-born New Zealand photographer

== Y ==
- Adele Younghusband (1878–1969), painter, photographer

== See also ==
- List of women photographers
