= List of Argentine women photographers =

This is a list of women photographers who were born in the South American country of Argentina or whose works are closely associated with that country.

== A ==
- Luciana Abait (born 1971), installation artist and art photographer based in the US state of California.
- Nora Aslan (born 1937), art photographer and visual artist

== B ==
- Delfina Blaquier (born 1980), photographer, fashion entrepreneur and former high jumper

== D ==
- Alicia D'Amico (1933–2001), leading professional photographer, interest in feminist issues

== F ==
- Sara Facio (1932–2024), portrait photographer

== H ==
- Annemarie Heinrich (1912–2005), German-born Argentine portrait and nude photographer
- Gaby Herbstein (born 1969), published photographer

== L ==
- Adriana Lestido (born 1955), black-and-white photographer, documenting woman's place in society

== M ==
- Matilde Marín (born 1948), artist working with photography, engraving and video

== P ==
- Ana Portnoy (1950–2020), portrait photographer in Spain
- Constanza Portnoy (born 1980s), photographer and photojournalist

== R ==
- Romina Ressia (born 1981), fashion and fine art photographer

== S ==
- Grete Stern (1904–1999), German-born fine art photographer

== T ==
- Susana Thénon (1935–1991), poet, translator, artistic photographer

== V ==
- Luciana Val (born 1971), fashion photographer together with Franco Musso
- Agustina Vivero (born 1991), photoblogger

== Z ==
- Helen Zout (born 1957), known for work relating to the disappearances from 1974 to 1983

== See also ==
- Argentine art
- List of Argentine women artists
- List of women photographers
