= Portnoy =

The name Portnoy, sometimes spelled Portnoi, is a Jewish surname of Russian origin. The Russian word 'портной' translates as 'tailor'. The name may refer to:

== People ==
- Ana Portnoy (1950–2020), Argentine photographer
- Constanza Portnoy (born 1980s), Argentinian photojournalist
- Daniel A. Portnoy (born 1956), American microbiologist
- Dave Portnoy (born 1977), American businessman, founder of Barstool Sports
- Edan Portnoy or Edan (born 1978), American rapper, DJ, and producer
- Eddy Portnoy, American expert on Jewish popular culture
- Elinor Portnoy, Israeli-born glass artist
- Elliott Portnoy (born 1965), American attorney
- Estee Portnoy, American businesswoman
- Ethel Portnoy (1927–2004), American-born Dutch writer
- Gary Portnoy (born 1956), American singer/songwriter
- Israel Portnoy (born 1990), English-born Israeli musician
- Jerry Portnoy (born 1943), American harmonica musician
- Mendy Portnoy (born 1992), English-born Israeli musician
- Michael Portnoy (born 1971), American performance artist
- Mike Portnoy (born 1967), American drummer and songwriter
- Steven Portnoy (born 1971), American journalist
- Suzanne Portnoy (born 1961), American erotic author
- Vladimir Portnoi (born 1931), Soviet gymnast

== Fictional characters ==
- Alexander Portnoy, the protagonist of Philip Roth's 1969 novel Portnoy's Complaint.
- Jeff Portnoy, a fictional comedic actor played by Jack Black in the 2008 film Tropic Thunder.
- Frankie Portnoy, a fictional thief in Aden Polydoros' 2021 novel The City Beautiful.
- Portnoy, an anthropomorsized groundhog in the cartoon Bloom County .

== Musical groups ==
- The Portnoy Brothers, British-Israeli folk rock duo formed in 2012
