= Lists of women photographers =

The following are lists of women photographers:

== Main list ==
- List of women photographers

== By country ==
- List of American women photographers
- List of Argentine women photographers
- List of Australian women photographers
- List of Austrian women photographers
- List of British women photographers
- List of Canadian women photographers
- List of Chinese women photographers
- List of Danish women photographers
- List of Dutch women photographers
- List of French women photographers
- List of German women photographers
- List of Japanese women photographers
- List of Mexican women photographers
- List of New Zealand women photographers
- List of Nigerian women photographers
- List of Norwegian women photographers
- List of Spanish women photographers
- List of Swedish women photographers
