= Partnoy =

Partnoy is a surname. Notable people with the surname include:

- Alicia Partnoy (born 1955), human rights activist, poet, professor, and translator
- Frank Partnoy (born 1967), American legal scholar
- Raquel Partnoy (born 1932), Argentine painter, poet, and essayist

== See also ==
- Portnoy
