= Kirker =

Kirker is a surname. Notable people with the surname include:

- Harold Kirker (1921–2018), American historian
- James Kirker (1793–1852), Irish-born American privateer, soldier, mercenary, merchant, and scalp hunter
- Marion Kirker (1879–1971), New Zealand photographer
- Thomas Kirker (1760–1837), American politician
- William Kirker (1866–1942), New Zealand cricketer
- William C. Kirker, namesake of Kirkersville, Ohio

== Given name ==
- Kirker Butler, American television writer
