= Robin Hyde =

New Zealand poet and novelist

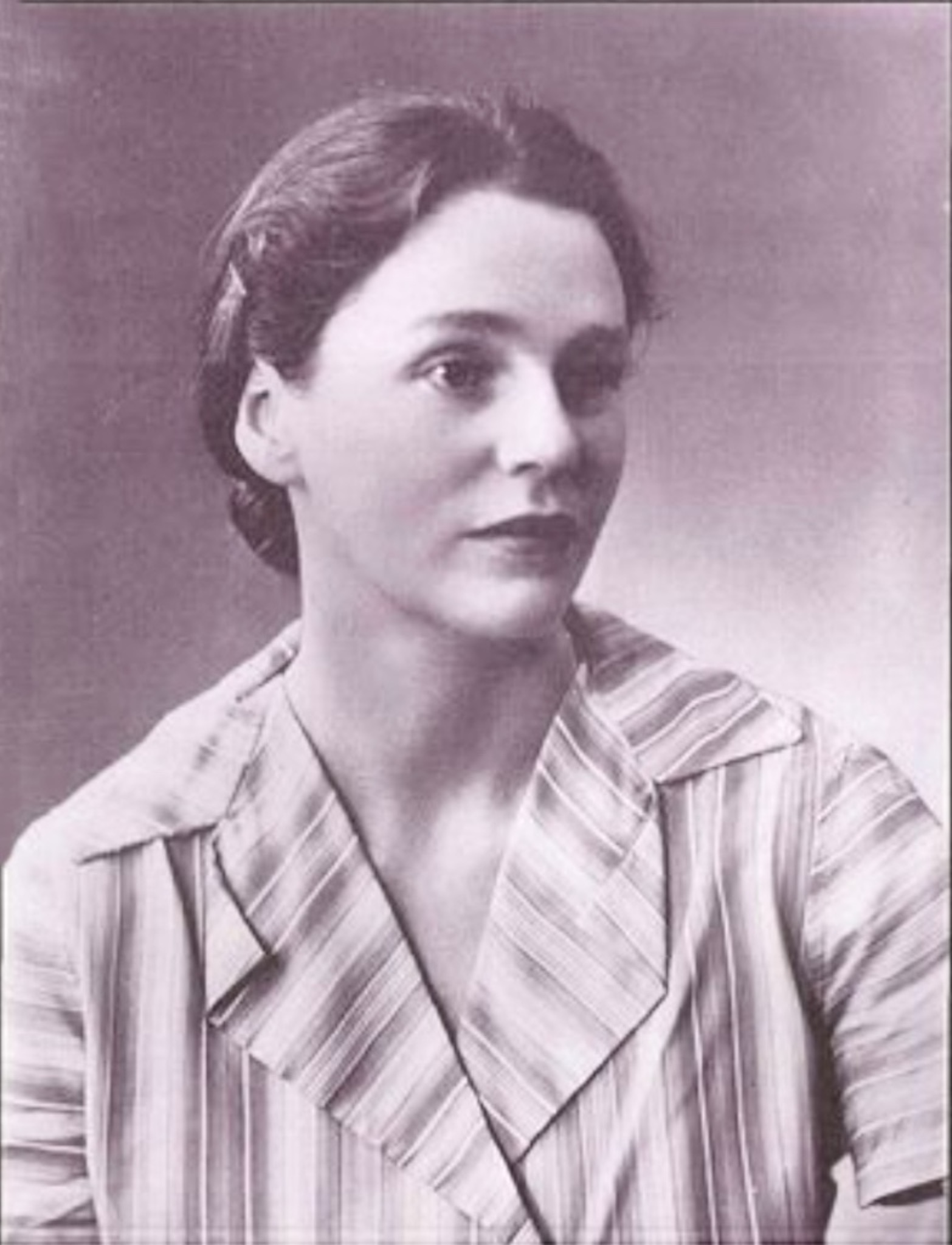
- Born: Iris Guiver Wilkinson; 19 January 1906; Cape Town, Cape Colony
- Died: 23 August 1939 (aged 33); Kensington, London, England
- Resting place: Kensington New Cemetery
- Citizenship: British subject
- Education: Wellington Girls' College, Victoria University of Wellington
- Occupation: Author
- Writing career
- Language: English

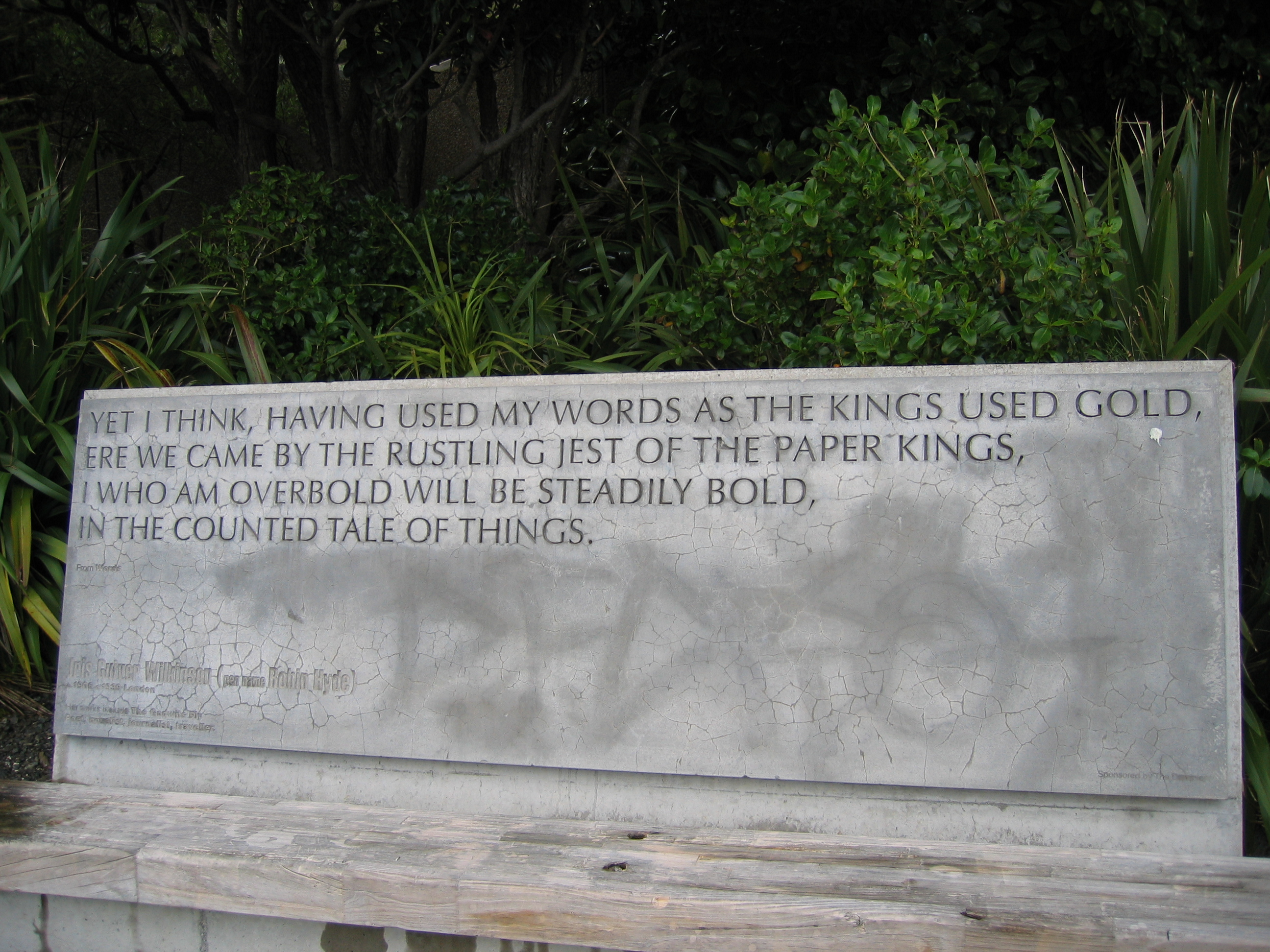
Sculpture of Robin Hyde's words installed on the Wellington waterfront

Robin Hyde, the pseudonym used by Iris Guiver Wilkinson (19 January 1906 – 23 August 1939), was a South African-born New Zealand poet, journalist and novelist.

== Early life ==
Wilkinson was born in Cape Town to an English father and an Australian mother, and was taken to Wellington before her first birthday. She had her secondary education at Wellington Girls' College, where she wrote poetry and short stories for the school magazine. After school she briefly attended Victoria University of Wellington. When she was 18, Hyde suffered a knee injury which required a hospital operation. Lameness and pain haunted her for the rest of her life. In 1925 she became a journalist for Wellington's Dominion newspaper, mostly writing for the women's pages. She continued to support herself through journalism throughout her life.

== Later life ==
While working at the Dominion, she had a brief love affair with Harry Sweetman, who left her to travel to England. In 1926, in Rotorua for a holiday and treatment for her tubercular knee, Hyde had an affair with Frederick de Mulford Hyde. When Hyde became pregnant, Frederick paid for her to have the child in Sydney, Australia. Their son, Christopher Robin Hyde, was stillborn. She was to adopt the name 'Robin Hyde' as a 'nom de guerre', to preserve his memory. On her return to New Zealand in December 1926, she discovered that Frederick had married. Traumatised by the loss of her child, Hyde was hospitalised at Queen Mary Hospital in Hanmer Springs and then cared for at the family home in Wellington, though only her mother knew of the pregnancy.

After a period of recovery, she began to write again, publishing poetry in several New Zealand newspapers in 1927. She was also engaged to write columns for the Christchurch Sun, and the Mirror. However, she became frustrated at the lack of creative input, as the papers merely wanted a social column. Social columns or women's pages were the main outlet available to women journalists during the period. These experiences contributed to her treatise on journalism in New Zealand, Journalese, published in 1934.

In 1930, while working for the Wanganui Chronicle, Hyde had an affair with the Marton-based journalist Harry Lawson Smith. Their son, Derek Arden Challis, was born in Picton that October. Lawson Smith was married, and his only relationship with Hyde and their son was to provide sporadic maintenance payments. In time Hyde's mother learned of Derek's existence, but her father was never told.

In 1929 Hyde published her first book of poetry, The Desolate Star. Between 1935 and 1938 she published five novels: Passport to Hell (1936), Check To Your King (1936), Wednesday's Children (1937), Nor the Years Condemn (1938), and The Godwits Fly (1938). A manuscript of her unpublished autobiography was given to Auckland Libraries by Dr Gilbert Tothill.

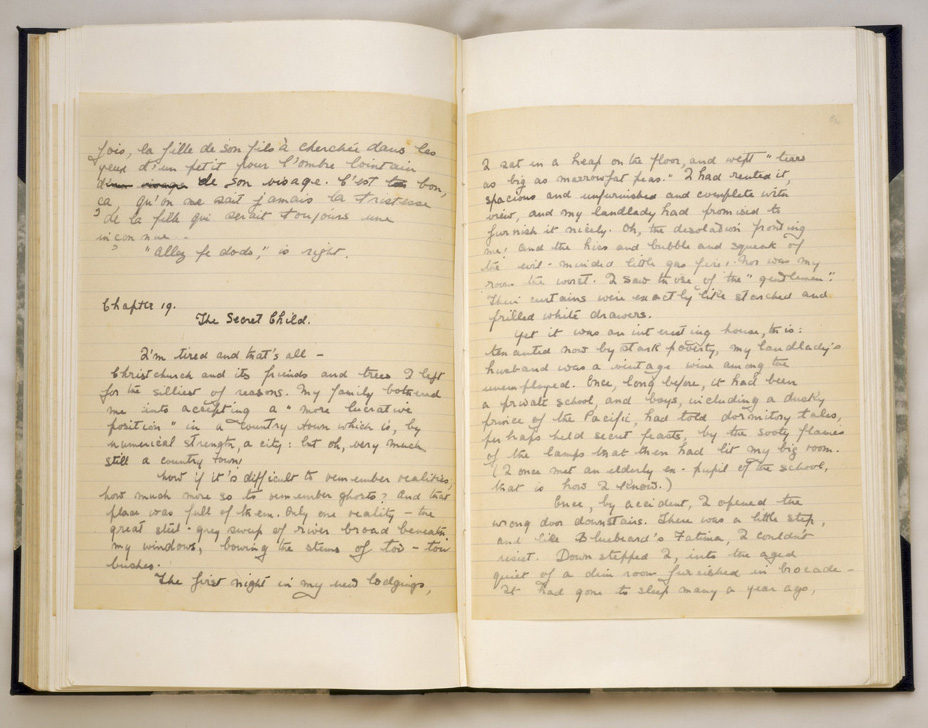
Manuscript of Robin Hyde's unpublished autobiography

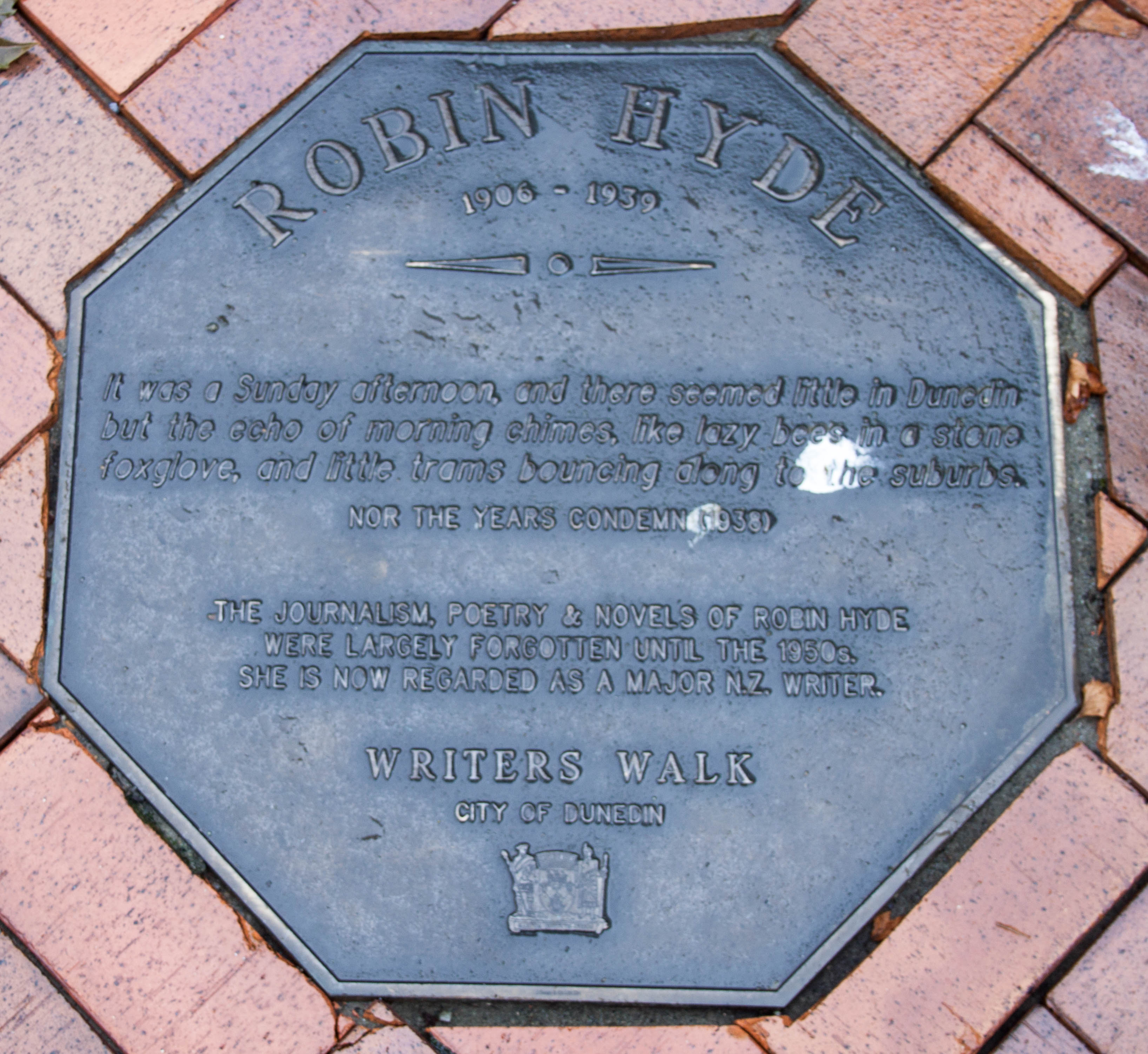
Memorial plaque dedicated to Robin Hyde in Dunedin, on the Writers' Walk on the Octagon

In July 1933 Hyde was committed to the Auckland Mental Hospital and was housed at the Penman House. Hyde was encouraged to write by her psychiatrist as it was believed to help heal her mind.

== Final years and death ==
In early 1938 she left New Zealand and travelled to Hong Kong, arriving in early February. At the time, much of eastern China was under Japanese occupation, after the 1931 Japanese invasion of Manchuria. Hyde was meant to travel to Kobe then Vladivostok to take the Trans-Siberian Railway to Europe. When the connection was delayed she made her way to Japanese-occupied Shanghai, where she met fellow New Zealander Rewi Alley. Various peregrinations through China followed, including Canton and Hankou, the latter of which was the centre of Chinese resistance to Japanese occupation. She moved north to visit the battlefront and was in Xuzhou when Japanese forces took the city on 19 May.

Hyde attempted to flee the area by walking along the railway lines and was eventually escorted by Japanese officials to the port city of Qingdao where she was handed over to British authorities. Shortly after she resumed her journey to England via sea, arriving in Southampton on 18 September 1938. She died by her own hand with an overdose of Benzedrine at 1 Pembridge Square, Kensington, a boarding house where she had been living. She was survived by a son, Derek Challis, and was buried in the Kensington New Cemetery, at Gunnersbury.

Many of Hyde's literary notes and personal papers were archived by the Alexander Turnbull Library and the Special Collections at the University of Auckland. In 2020, these archival papers were inscribed on the UNESCO Memory of the World Aotearoa New Zealand Ngā Mahara o te Ao register.
