= Carrington Hospital =

Psychiatric hospital in Auckland, New Zealand

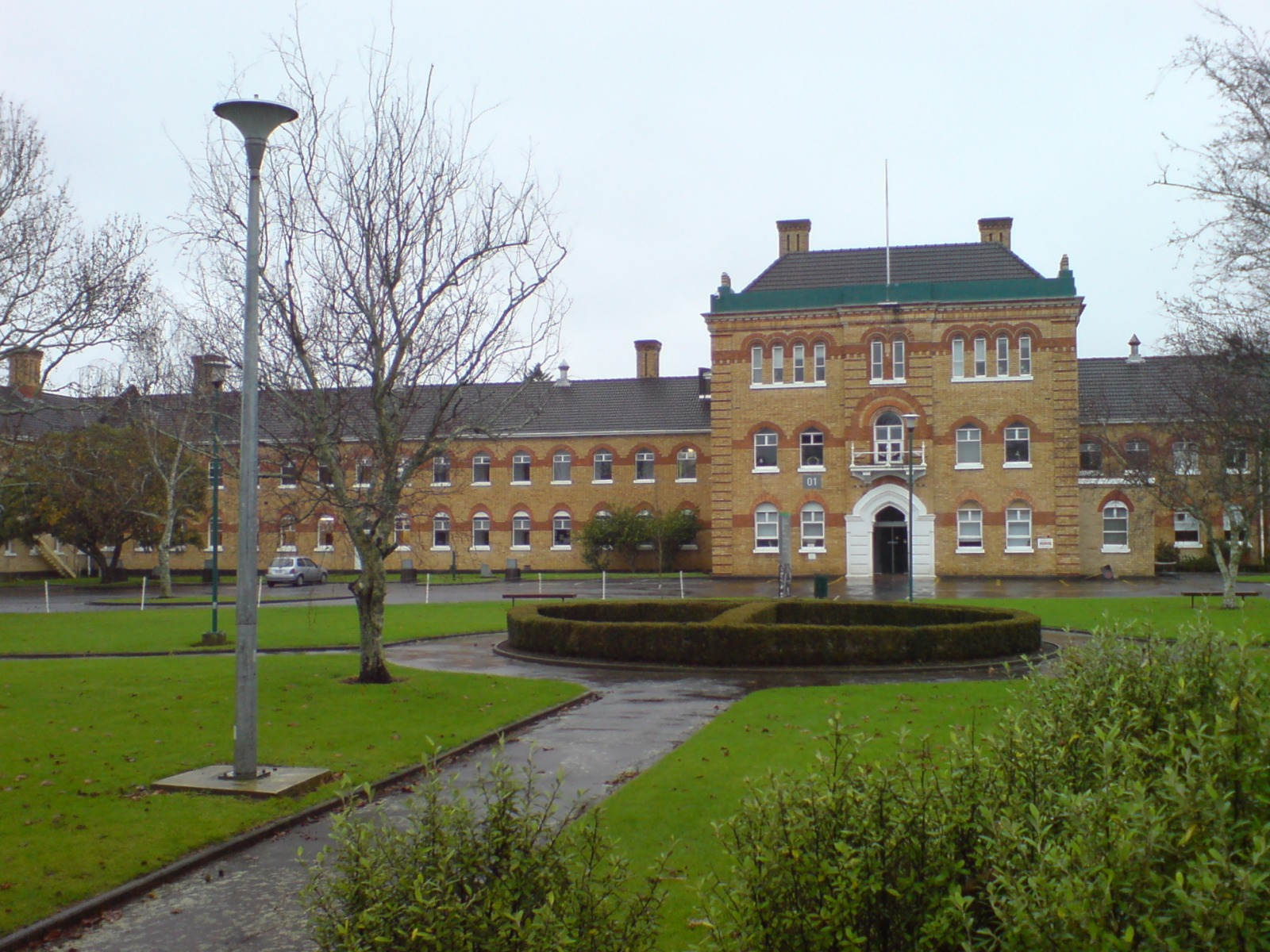
- Carrington Hospital in July 2007
- Former names
Historical names
Lunatic Asylum at the Whau, Auckland Lunatic Asylum, Avondale Lunatic Asylum, Avondale Hospital, Auckland Mental Health Hospital, Oakley Hospital, and Carrington Psychiatric Hospital

General information
- Type: Hospital
- Architectural style: Victorian
- Location: Carrington, 1/1-44/1 Carrington Road, Point Chevalier, Auckland
- Coordinates: 36.874975°S 174.706332°E

Design and construction
- Architect: James Wrigley
- Main contractor: Henry White

Heritage New Zealand – Category 1
- Designated: 3 March 1986
- Reference no.: 96

Carrington Hospital is a former lunatic asylum and psychiatric hospital listed as a Category I building, located in Point Chevalier, Auckland.

Serving as the main asylum for Auckland for over a century the asylum was closed down with the land and building sold to Carrington Technical Institute (later Unitec). Most of the former site was sold to the Crown in 2018–2021 to be used for a large residential development.

== Etymology ==
Originally known as the Whau Lunatic Asylum the asylum has undergone many name changes over its lifetime. Some of the names include: the Auckland Lunatic Asylum, Avondale Lunatic Asylum, Auckland Mental Hospital and Oakley Hospital.

== History ==
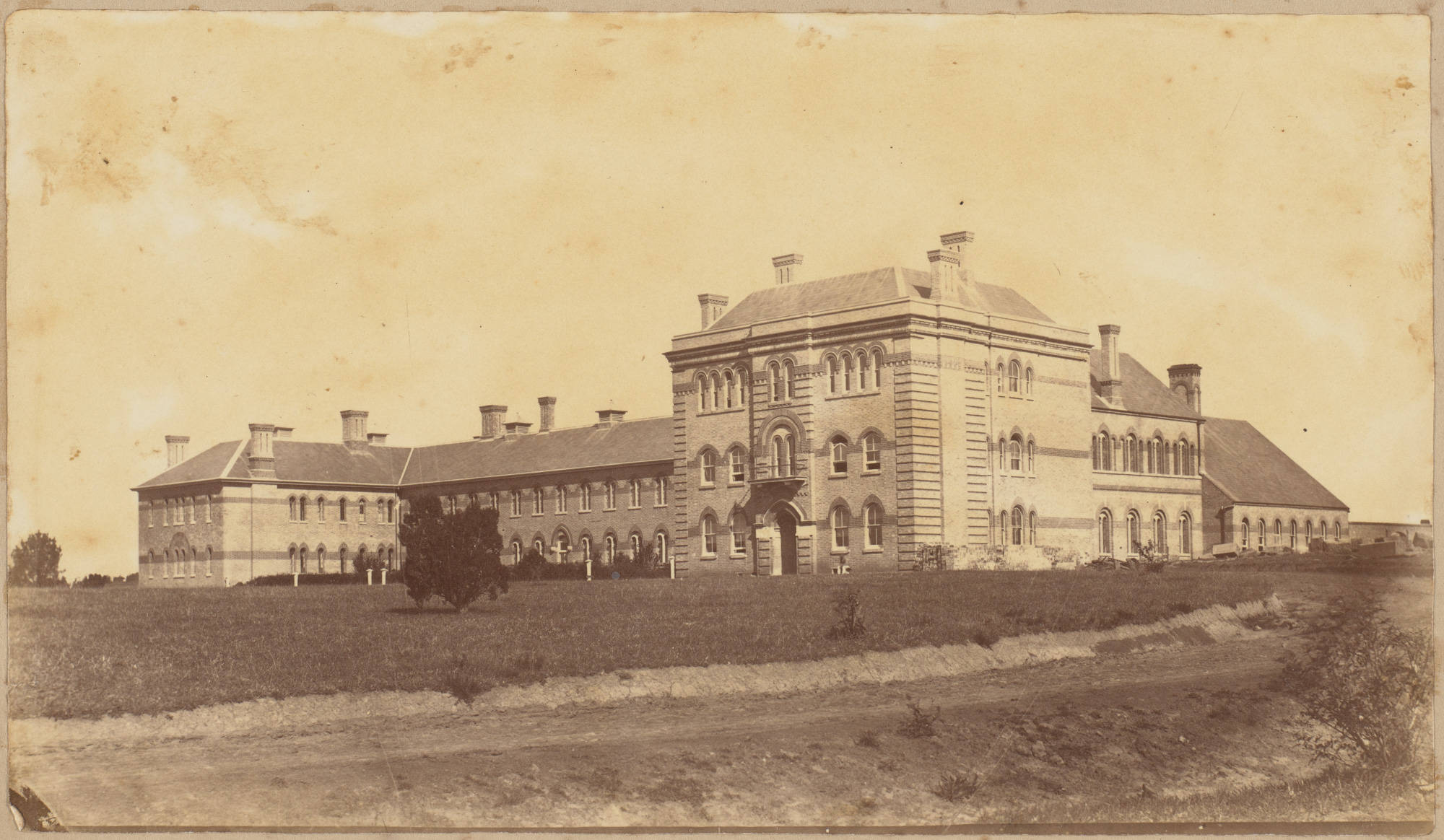
The Auckland Lunatic Asylum in the 1870s

=== Background ===
The 1846 Lunatics Act allowed for lunatics to be institutionalised at either the city gaol or at Grafton Hospital, which had a purpose built structure for lunatics. The Grafton Hospital building was not fit for purpose and struggled to keep up with the growing population. Concern about the poor conditions for lunatics led to a public meeting on 14 January 1851, with John Frederick Churton and Frederick Thatcher being the leading supporters of a dedicated asylum for the Auckland Province. A decision was made to construct a purpose built lunatic asylum, similar to those in Britain, as some lunatics were incarcerated due to the overcrowded and squalid conditions of the asylum at Grafton. The Carrington site was selected as it was believed to be beneficial to the health of the inmates: being far enough from urban and industrial areas and having good land for agriculture, with the Oakley Creek providing a good water supply. Ellerslie and Three Kings were also proposed as suitable locations for an asylum.

=== Construction of the new asylum ===
In September 1863, architectural plans by a Mr Barrett from England (Note: No English architect by the name of 'Barrett' has been identified; however, the New South Wales Colonial Architect James Barnet may be the architect as he designed the similar Callan Park Lunatic Asylum and the plans came from the Alice Cameron, a ship that travelled between Sydney and Auckland.) were submitted to the Auckland architect James Wrigley who adapted them for considerations to the site in question. Henry White was the builder. John Thomas of Oakley Creek was awarded a brick contract for the building materials, but being unable to complete the contract, it fell on Dr. Pollen to supply the rest of the bricks. Some of the bricks were produced on-site while others were produced at Dr Pollen's Avondale brickyard. Over 500,000 bricks were used to build the asylum. Pollen supplied 500,000 and George Boyd supplied 50,000 red bricks. Issues in securing the brick supply lead to the delay in completion of the building. The building was complete in March 1867 and has an Italianate and Venetian Gothic influence. Upon completion it was the largest brick building in New Zealand was considered an object of pride by Aucklanders. The asylum was at times opened to the public for plays, music, and dancing. Public tours were also offered at times.

=== Later history ===
In 1877 Frederick William Adolphus Skae reviewed the asylum as part of a national report on the state of lunatic asylums. The report was largely critical of the Whau Lunatic Asylum, noting that the facility was over-capacity, being designed for 50 inmates but housing 165; that only 3–4 acres of 26 was properly cultivated; that most inmates were unemployed; that recreation was limited due to the overcrowding; and that restraint was overused. Skae noted poor drainage leading to the prevalence of typhoid; the poor drainage would cause another outbreak in 1890 that led to the death of a patient and a coronial inquest. Concerns about overcrowding and squalid conditions led to the construction of the Kingseat Mental Hospital as a replacement; however, Kingseat ultimately served as a secondary hospital and Carrington remained. Institutionalisation was high in New Zealand reaching 2% of the population in the 1950s and 1960s. Some people remained at the asylum despite not presenting a harm to the public and being labelled as 'incurable imbeciles', this was due to a lack of residence to return to. It was believed that these imbeciles were to end up arrested under the Vagrancy Act and ultimately sent back to the asylum.

After the building was gutted by an 1877 fire, Philip Herapath supervised the reconstruction. In 1879, a new wing to the asylum was under construction and stone for it was mined from nearby Oakley Creek. An estimated two-thousand tons of stone was made available in this exercise through detonation of 16 barrels of gunpowder under a 20-foot deep bed of lava, which created a miniature "earthquake" felt in the surrounding area. The Crown purchased three allotments at a price of £4,200 to establish a farm for the asylum. It was to provide both food and work for the patients. A piggery was built in the 1880s and a milking shed, hay store, and farm manager's home were constructed c.1882. The purpose of the farm was due to a British philosophy that fresh air and labour were appropriate treatments for mental maladies. Farms enabled asylums to be self-sufficient and provided a source of employment to patients. These purchases enlarged the farm to 139 acres (56 ha) and enabled the asylum to be self-sufficient, with excess produce sold to help fund the asylum. In 1889 a news article reported the asylum had an orchard, dairy, and piggery with 50–60 Berkshire crosses. In 1929 had 73 head of cattle, 279 pigs, and 14 horses. In 1924 farm produce sales had earnt the hospital £13,195.

The champion Ayrshire Balmoral

An auxiliary building was constructed in 1884 to house a growing patient population. This building burnt to the ground in 1894 and was replaced with a new building. In the 1920s this new building was known as Oakleigh Hall and was used as a 'parole villa'. The building is now known as Building 048 as part of the Unitec campus. Other buildings constructed in the 1880s include a boiler room, drying room, and workshop buildings. Later constructions include accommodation for the medical superintendent in 1909, two auxiliary hospital buildings in 1913 and 1915, and the Penman House in 1930.

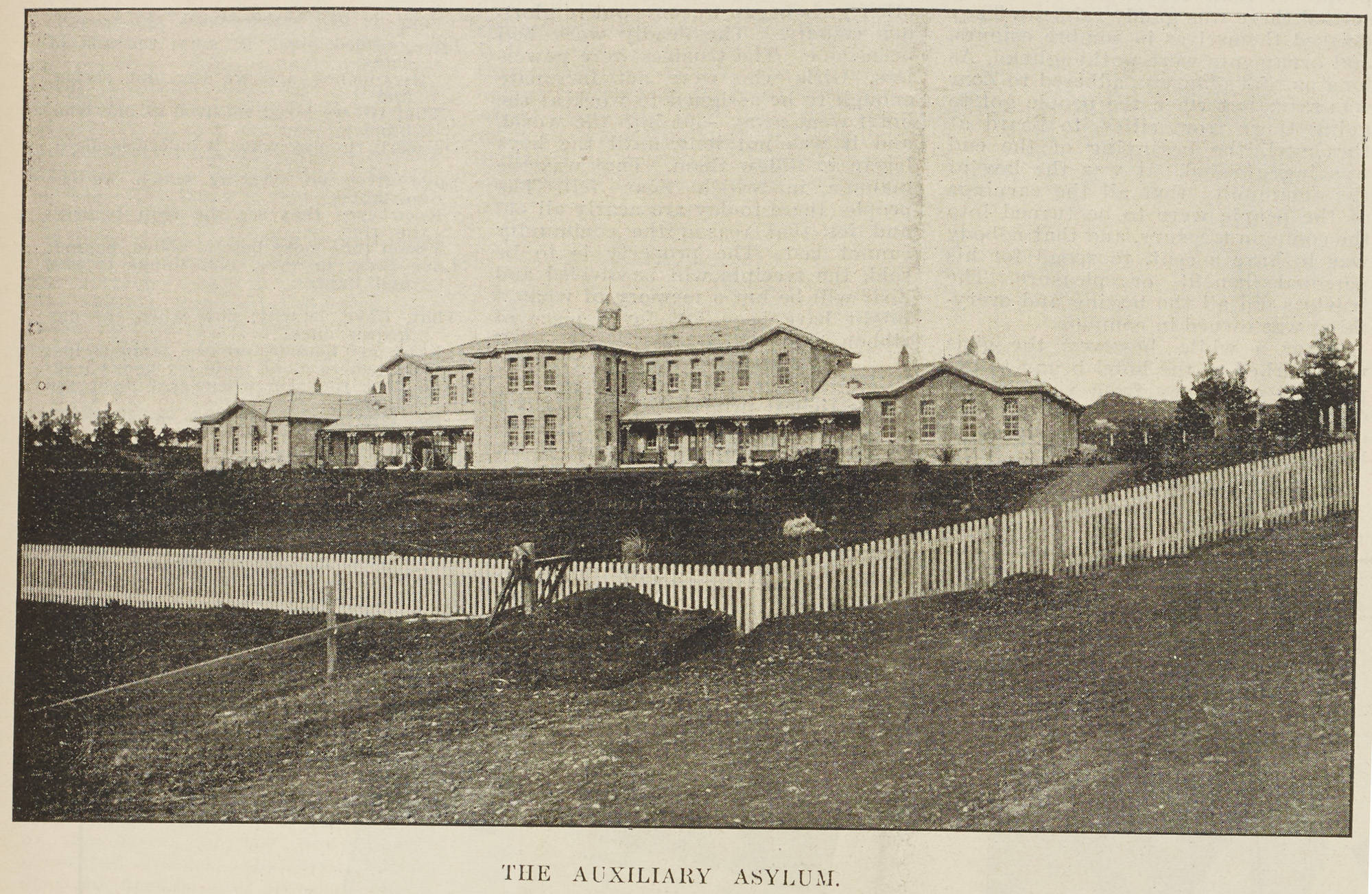
Oakleigh Hall in 1898

From 1869 to 1879, Thomas Aickin served as medical superintendent, succeeding Robert Ellis Fisher. In 1886 John Cremonini was appointed Medical Superintendent. Cremonini attempted to modernise the asylum but several of his measures were unpopular and most of the staff resigned in protest. In 1889 Cremonini resigned. T. R. King, Medical Superintendent, resigned in 1891 because of ill-health, and was succeeded by Gray Hassell, who had been an administrator at the Wellington Hospital and Wellington Asylum.

Under Robert Martin Beattie an attempt was made to employ professional standards for mental health nurses starting in the 20th-century. Beattie expressed his wishes that a formal register like for regular hospital nursing could be established. Unlike hospital nursing there was a greater proportion of male nurses, partly on account of the inability for female nurses to overpower male patients. In 1925 Theo Gray was superintendent. Gray had previously worked at the hospital and would go on to serve as Inspector-General of Mental Hospitals in 1927. Gray was a proponent of the villa system, registration of nurses, and occupational therapy. Gray rejected modern approaches such as psychotherapy and drugs; however, he did support eugenics.

Initially the hospital met its water requirements with cisterns and a well, but in 1897 a reservoir and pumping station were constructed. In 1900 excess supply was being sent to Western Springs, 4 years later a larger pumping station was constructed. In 1910 the Mount Albert Road Board took over the pumping station in exchange for providing water at a fixed rate to the asylum.

In December 1900, there were 494 patients—306 males and 188 females. The staff included 31 males and 21 females. The average net cost per patient was, in 1898, £19 13s, and, in 1899, £20 8s. The average number of patients sent out cured in 1898 was 51%, and in 1899, 38%; average deaths, 1898, 7.5; in 1899, 8.8. The officials of the institution at the time were Robert Martin Beattie, medical superintendent; William Webster, assistant medical officer; Edward Newport, head attendant; Sophia Campbell, matron; and J. D. Muir, farm manager. Religious service was held on Sunday by ministers of the denominations of which patients were members. In 1927 the population had grown to over 1,100, with many auxiliary buildings constructed to help house this population. The hospital had an annual picnic to Henderson and in 1927 446 patients attended.

In 1940 Margaret Inman arrived and established the first occupational therapy school in New Zealand at Carrington. By 1950 around 30 to 40 women had received training from Inman. Following the Second World War more experimental treatments were introduced including electroconvulsive shock therapy (1946), leucotomy (1950), and insulin coma therapy (1952).

In 1971 a commission of inquiry into Carrington Hospital was opened. A presentation on behalf of the New Zealand Medical Association concluded that the hospital needed to halve and to stop admitting addicts, alcoholics, criminals, and geriatrics. Following this inquiry control of the hospital was transferred to the Auckland Hospital Board. From this point on the name Carrington was adopted for the facility, although the name Oakley remained in use for high security patients. Oakley Hospital was finally shut down on 17 August 1987. Carrington Hospital continued to operate, although at a reduced capacity. The Mason Clinic was established in 1991 to care for high risk patients, often the criminally insane. In 1992 Carrington Hospital was closed by the Auckland Area Health Board and was purchased by a tertiary education provider, Carrington Polytec, who refurbished the building, opening the Unitec Institute of Technology School of Architecture and Design in 1994.

Starting in 2018 Unitec transfer land to the Crown as part of a roughly 40 hectares (99 acres) housing development involving the construction of thousands of homes. This development is known as the Carrington Development. The development is being undertaken by the Ministry of Housing and Urban Development in partnership with three different Maori groups as part of a treaty settlement. Most of the auxiliary buildings of the asylum were demolished in 2023 as part of this development.

As of 2024 two wings of the building have been demolished to allow for a new road to be constructed.

In February 2025 consent was granted to demolish Penman House. Despite a report from Heritage New Zealand stating the building had heritage value and multiple notable New Zealand authors opposing it due to the buildings association with Robin Hyde (Note: Hyde was a resident of the asylum and spent time in Penman House), the demolition began in November 2025.

In May 2026 Auckland Council issued a bylaw notice to the Carrington Development over the decay and neglect of the Carrington Hospital, which has suffered water damage and repeated vandalism.

== Description ==
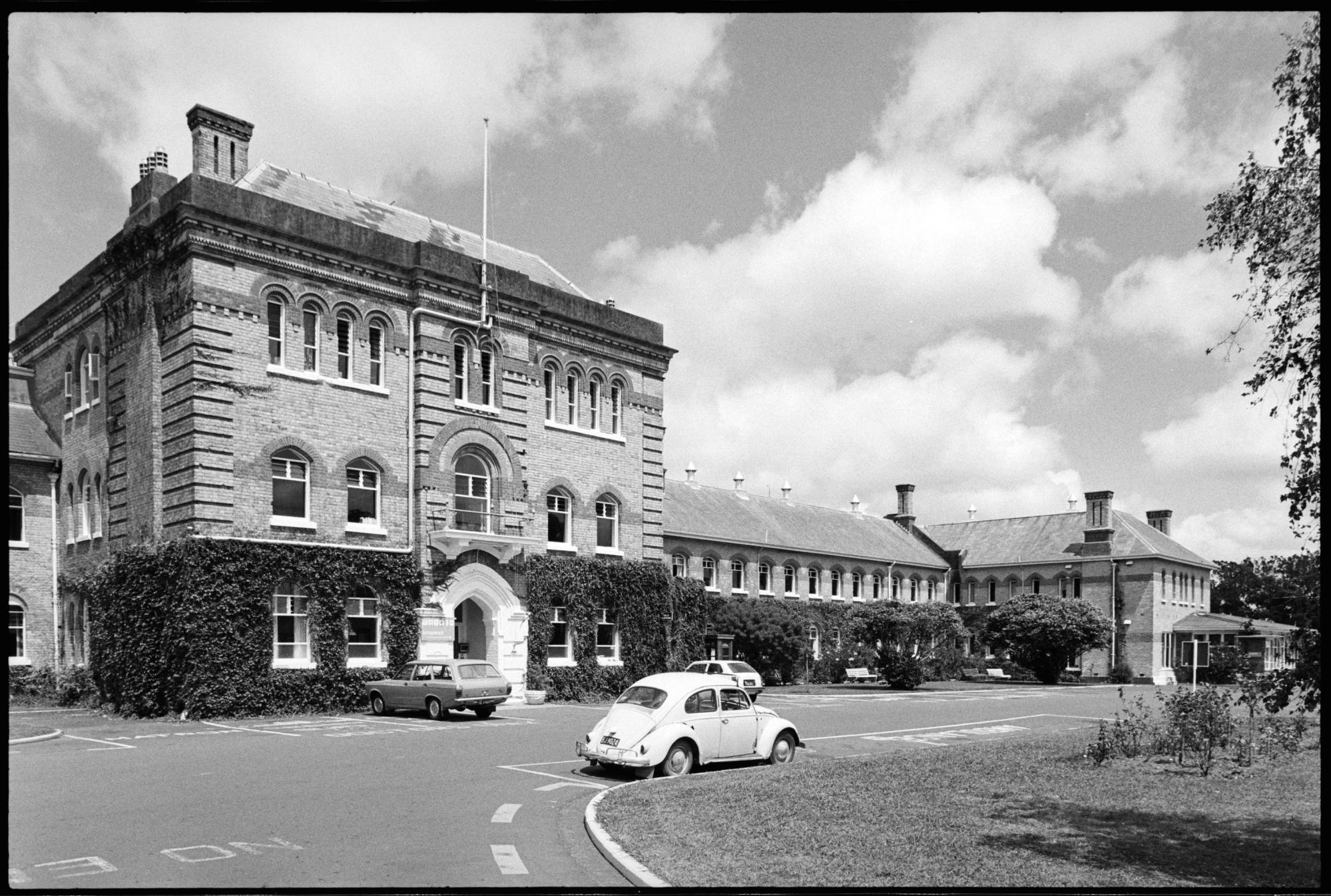
The hospital building in 1977, then known as Oakley Hospital

The facade is neoclassical and has polychromatic detailing. Built of brick, it faced the junction of Great North Road and Carrington Road, leading to Mount Albert. In the central portion of the building were the dining halls, kitchen, and store-rooms, and the two adjoining wings were the male and female wards. The male dining hall was also used for theatrical and musical performances. A new brick building was completed in 1896–1897. The chapel of St Luke the Physician, built in 1865, was used as a dormitory since 1875, but was renovated and reopened as a chapel in 1961. The Conolly Room at the hospital was named after English doctor, John Conolly.

A two-storey dairy shed was constructed c.1892 (Note: Richard Seddon references a 'cattle byre' being constructed in 1892 at the asylum, but it is unknown if the building he referred to is the same one)). The dairy shed was referred to as a byre, a term used for a building that served as winter shelter for cattle; however, in New Zealand the mild climate negated the need for winter shelter and the term was used interchangeably with milking shed. The building is similar in design to byres in Britain and as such is unique in New Zealand. In 1947 milking machines were installed. By 1988 the dairy shed was the only building remaining of the original farm complex. The dairy shed had a Brutalist extension built on to it during Unitec ownership. This extension won an architectural award. It was later demolished in 2024 for the Carrington housing development. The dairy shed remains as of 2025; however, the building is not protected. Most of the buildings of the asylum constructed in the 19th-century were brick but the dairy shed was constructed from cement.

Penman House was a large English Domestic Revival residence. Penman House was constructed in 1909–1910. The property had 15 rooms and was the residence of the medical superintendent. Penman House was located at the southeastern extremity of the Carrington site, isolated from the rest of the site with a commanding view over the asylum and the Waitemata Harbour. In 1929 it was proposed to convert the building into residence for less seriously ill female patients. It was thought the building was underutilised as the residence for the medical superintendent, with the 15 rooms being able to host 20 patients compared to the superintendent and his family. The Mount Albert Borough Council and local MP protested this decision but the conversion went ahead and in 1931 the first patients moved into the lodge. Robin Hyde moved into Penman House in July 1933. Hyde's psychiatrist, Gilbert Tothill, encouraged her writing as a way to heal her mind. Penman House was demolished in November 2025.

== Grounds ==
A spring on the estate, and a waterfall on Oakley Creek, was ample for domestic and fire prevention purposes. A farm, consisting of nearly 200 acres (81 ha), was attached to the asylum, providing for healthful recreation and fresh vegetables. There were approximately 50 milk cows on the estate, and numerous pigs. Fresh eggs was obtained from the farm's poultry. Part of the land was turned into an experimental sewage farm. The oldest building has several notable trees and shrubs of interest including holm oak, sweetgum, chaste tree, and pigeonberry. In 1969, the Auckland University Council decided that the farm was not suitable for university development, but wanted to convert 50 acres (20 ha) for playing fields while Auckland Technical Institute wanted 20 acres (8.1 ha).

== Notable patients ==
- Elizabeth O was the patient with the longest tenure, having been committed for 33 years for melancholia.
- Stephen Spalding was arrested for burning down his workplace but found not guilty due to insanity. Spalding was committed but later petitioned for his release due to his claims of now being sane. His release was denied and he later escaped from the asylum before being arrested and transferred to the Porirua Lunatic Asylum, from which he managed to escape before being arrested and reincarcerated.
