= Margaret Matilda White =

New Zealand photographer (1868–1910)

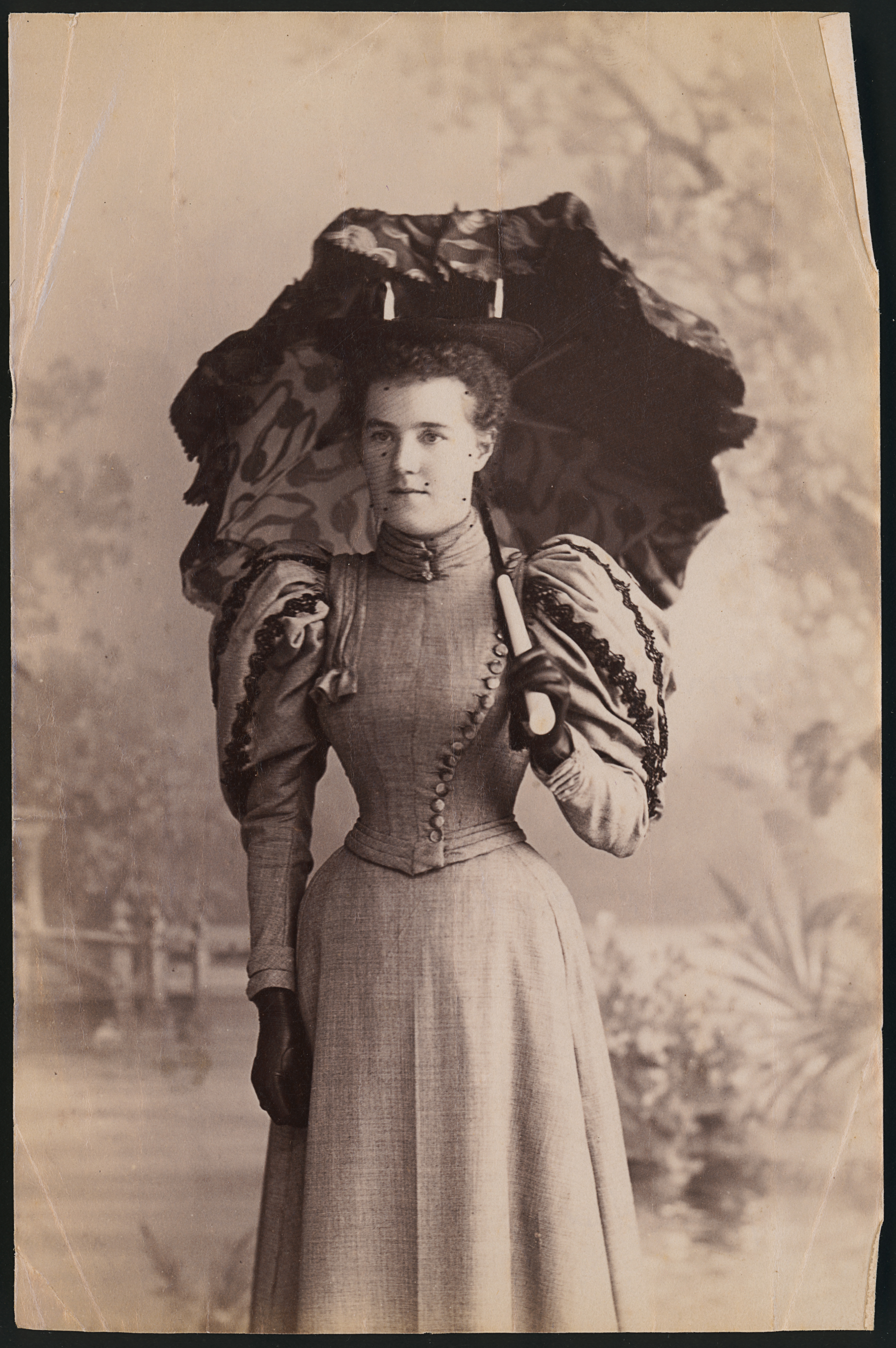
- Born: 9 January 1868; Belfast, Northern Ireland
- Died: 6 July 1910 (aged 42); Waihi, New Zealand
- Known for: Photography
- Spouse: Albert Reed

Margaret Matilda White (Reed) (9 January 1868 – 6 July 1910) was a New Zealand photographer and nurse. Her best known works are photographs she took at the Auckland Mental Hospital. A collection of her glass plates is held by the Auckland War Memorial Museum.

== Biography ==
White was born in Belfast, Northern Ireland, and emigrated to New Zealand with her family in 1886. She married her husband Albert Reed in 1900 and had two children. From 1890 she worked with New Zealand photographer John Hanna in his studio. She later established her own photographic studio in Newton, Auckland. However this venture was not a success and she was forced to close her business. Despite this failure she continued to take photographs up until her death. After the closure of her studio she worked and volunteered as a nurse at the Auckland Mental Hospital in Avondale. It was while working there that she took a series of photographs for which she is best known. These photographs showcased buildings as well as staff who were typically posed in her characteristic structured group poses.

She died at Waihi Hospital on 6 July 1910 from tetanus after stepping on a nail.

Mrs A. Reed, jun., of Karangahake, and well known in Whangarei, died in the Waihi hospital last week. Her death was occasioned by blood poisoning, caused by a nail piercing her foot.

Auckland War Memorial Museum holds a large collection of White's photographic glass plates.
