= Daniel Zamir =

Israeli saxophonist and singer

Daniel Zamir דניאל זמיר
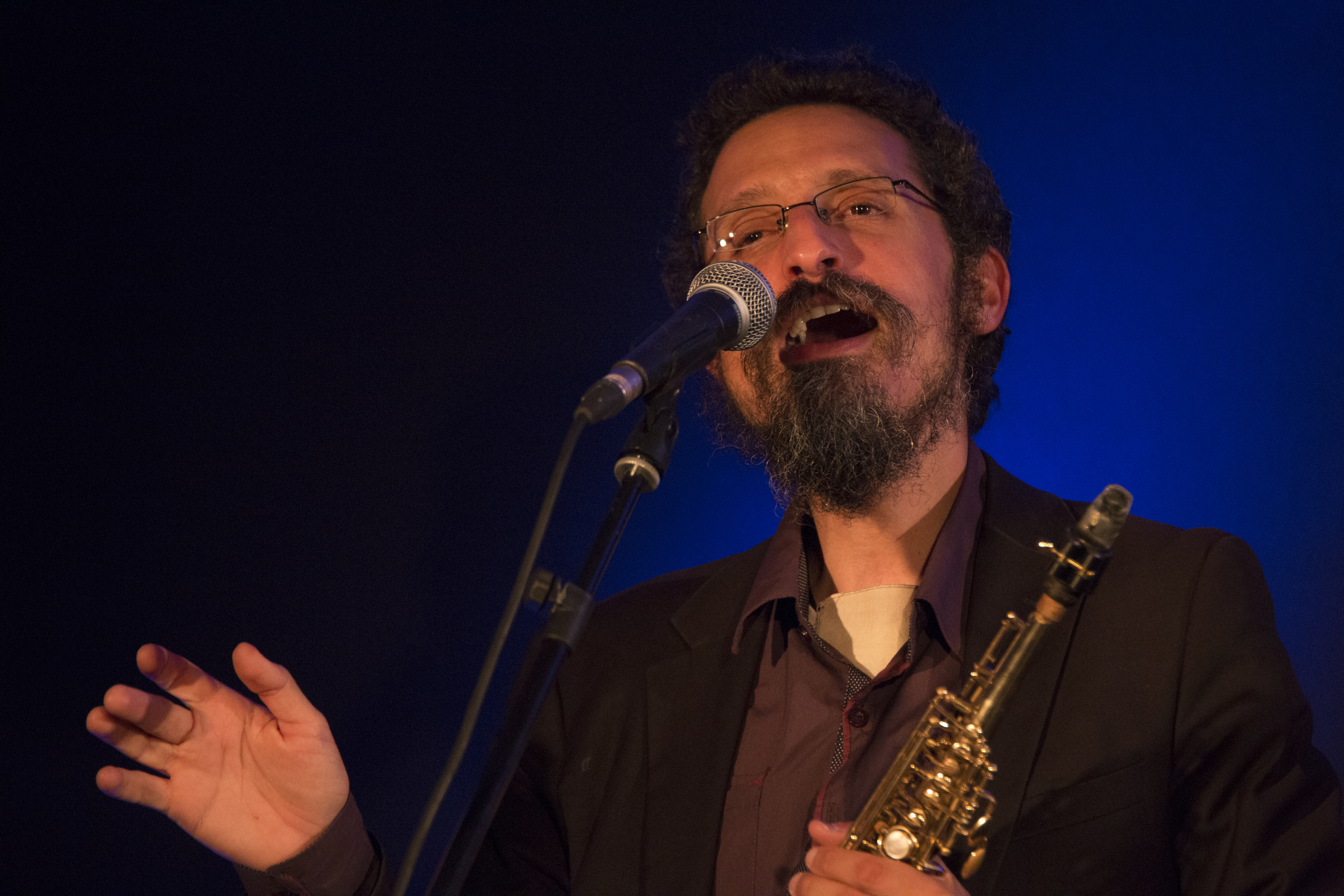

Background information
- Born: 1980; Petah Tikva, Israel
- Genres: Jazz; Klezmer; Jewish
- Labels: Tzadik, Hatav Hashmini
- Member of: Satlah

Daniel Zamir (Hebrew: דניאל זמיר; born 1980 in Petah Tikva) is an Israeli saxophonist and singer. Having started on alto saxophone, Zamir is mainly known for his soprano playing.

== Background ==
Zamir was born to a secular family and started playing the saxophone at the age of eleven. He is a graduate of Thelma Yellin High School of Arts in Israel. After he finished his studies he left for New York City, where he began showing interest in Jewish, Hasidic and East European music as well as West Indian rhythmic approaches. He completed his studies at The New School in 2002.

== With John Zorn ==
In New York, he was discovered by the Jewish composer-saxophonist John Zorn, who signed him to a contract in his recording label "Tzadik".

Under the "Tzadik" label, Zamir recorded three albums with his band, Satlah, with Zorn as a sideman. They recorded two studio albums called Children of Israel and Satlah, as well as a live performance called "Exodus". Satlah and Exodus contain original materials written by Zamir himself, while Children of Israel contains original jazz variations of known traditional Israeli and Jewish compositions. In all three albums, Zamir performs as soloist together with a rhythm section, which includes bass and drums, accompanied by an ensemble of brass instruments.

In 2007, Zamir recorded I Believe for Zorn's label with the acclaimed rhythm section of Zorn, including Joey Baron on drums, Uri Caine on piano and Greg Cohen on double bass.

In 2015, Zamir released Redemption Songs on Tzadik, featuring another high powered band including Mark Guiliana on drums, Shai Maestro on piano and more great Israeli musicians.

== In Israel ==
While staying in New York, Zamir got closer to the Jewish religion and finally became an orthodox Jew. He also decided to go back to live in Israel. In 2006, he recorded his fifth album, Amen, under the Israeli label "Hatav Hashmini", with Omer Avital on bass, Daniel Friedman on drums and Omri Mor on piano. Avishai Cohen plays trumpet on one of the tracks.

In 2009, Zamir released a second album on the "Hatav Hashmini" label titled Echad (One). Zamir featured percussionist virtuoso Zohar Fresco and Israeli Rockn'Roll legend Berry Sakharof on vocals and electric guitar.

== Music festivals ==
Zamir appeared in many festivals. Some of these include: "Krakow Jewish Culture Festival" in Poland; "Red Sea Jazz Festival" in Eilat, Israel; Jarasum Festival in Korea; Ottawa International Jazz Festival in Canada; Melbourne International Jazz Festival in Australia; Saulkrasty Festival in Latvia; Warsaw "Singer" Festival in Poland; Nurnberg NueJazz Festival in Germany; Vienna's Klez Festival in Austria and more festivals in Japan and the USA. He performed with guitarist Nitzan Bar at the 14th Philippine International Jazz Festival in 2019.

== Personal life ==
Zamir was married in 2008 and divorced in 2014. He has 2 children. In 2020 he revealed in an interview that he is bisexual and a relationship with a man in the past 2 years. However because of his Jewish orthodox religious belief he wished to remarry with a woman.

== Discography ==
- Satlah (2000)
- Children of Israel (2002)
- Exodus (2003)
- Zamir Sings (pop!) 2004
- Amen (2006)
- I Believe (2008)
- Echad (2009)
- Gaagua Lekan (2010)
- Song For Comfort (2012)
- Alive (2015)
- Forth and Back (2015)
- Redemption Songs (2015)
- Esa Einai (2015) (with Mendy Portnoy)
