= Toi Mahara =

Coordinates: 40°52′35″S 175°03′52″E

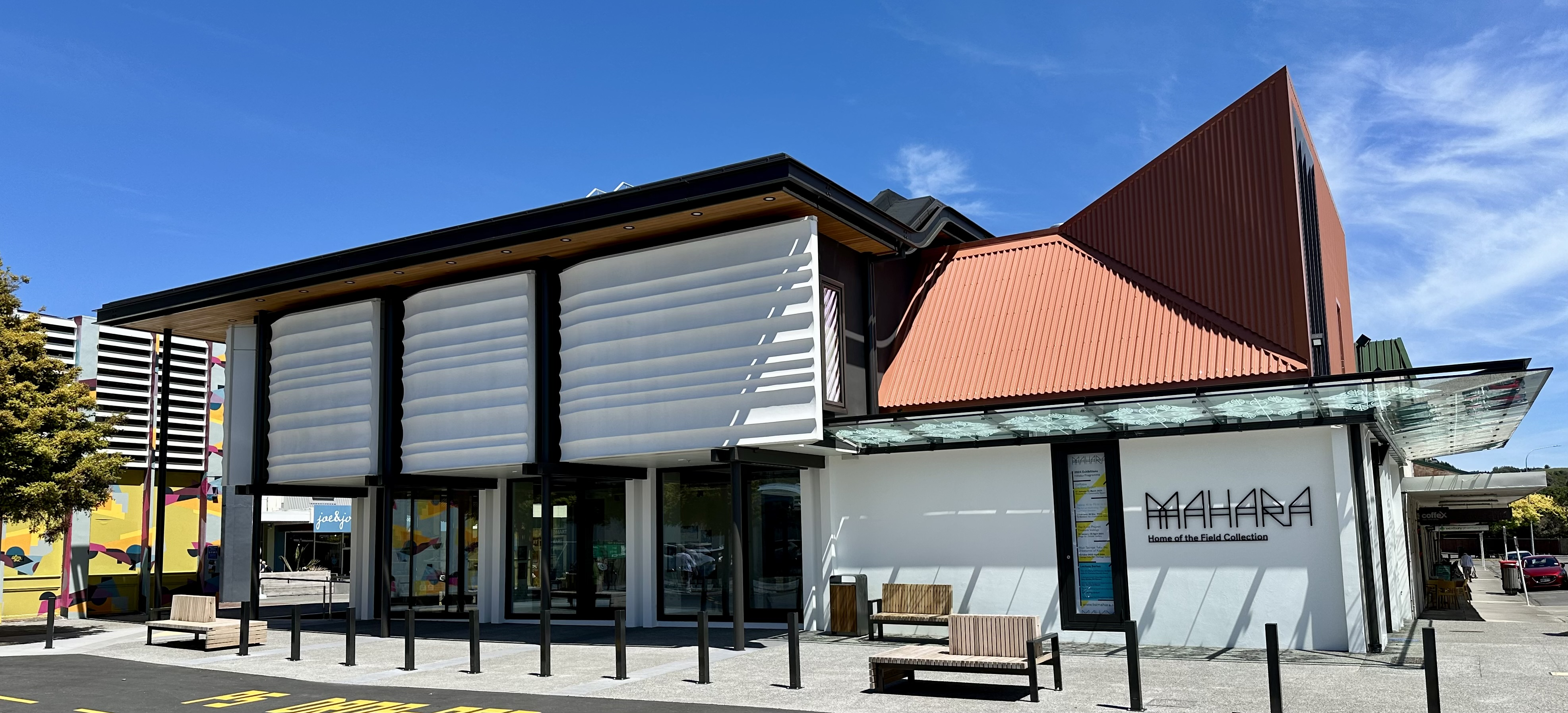
- Established: 1996
- Type: Art gallery
- Director: Janet Bayly
- Website: toimahara.nz

Toi Mahara is a public art gallery located in Waikanae, New Zealand. Mahara Gallery was opened in 1996. It was renovated in 2023 and renamed "Toi Mahara".

The gallery houses the Field Collection. Among the collection's holdings are 24 paintings by the celebrated painter Frances Hodgkins.
