= Pigeonberry =

Pigeonberry or pigeon berry is a common name for several flowering plants and may refer to:

- Amelanchier alnifolia, native to North America
- Duranta erecta
- Phytolacca americana, native to North America
- Rivina humilis
