= Agustina Vivero =

Argentine photoblogger

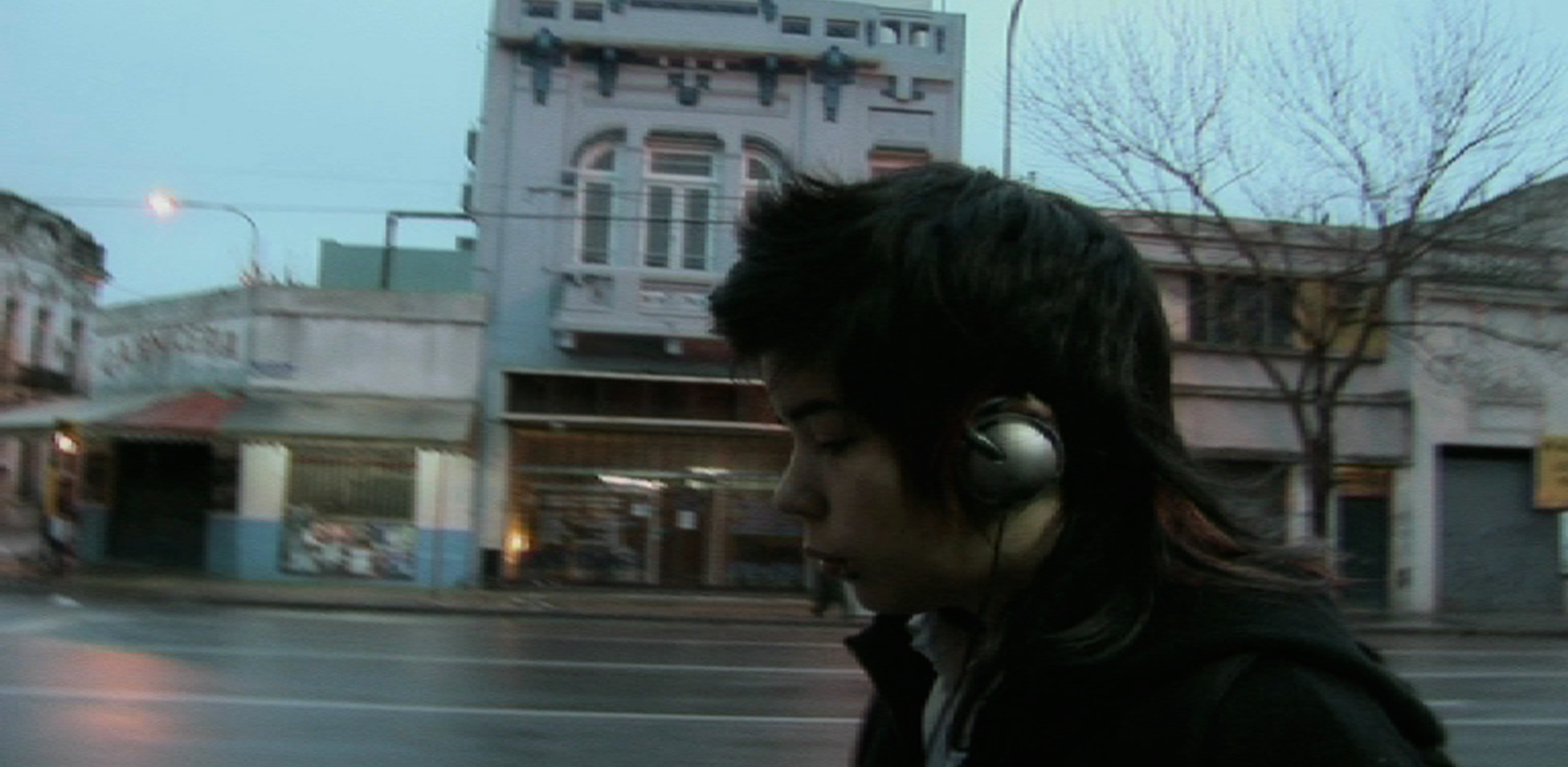
- Born: May 6, 1991 (age 34); Corrientes, Argentina
- Other names: Cumbio (pseudonym); La Reina de Los Floggers (nickname)
- Occupation: Photoblogger
- Known for: Influence in the flogger community

Agustina Elvira Vivero (born 6 May 1991), popularly known by her pseudonym Cumbio and given the nickname La Reina de Los Floggers, is an Argentine photoblogger. She is recognized as being the most influential member of the flogger subculture, from which her nickname derives, having been credited with its creation and organization of several meetups of its members. She has been recognized internationally, being interviewed by The New York Times and El País.

Since opening in 2006, Vivero's photoblog has garnered more than 36 million visits. In 2008, she wrote her autobiography Yo, Cumbio. Since mid-2010, she has worked as a columnist for Telefe and in 2013 joined Almorzando con Mirtha Legrand as an assistant behind the scenes.

The pseudonym "Cumbio" derives from Vivero's love for cumbia music.
