= Louisa M. Herrmann =

New Zealand woman photographer

- Born: Louisa Marion Eton; June 11, 1864; London, United Kingdom
- Died: June 3, 1955 (aged 90); Wellington, New Zealand
- Known for: photography
- Spouse(s): Richard Herrmann and George Wilson
- Children: Inez Herrmann and Sizmur Maxwell Wilson

Louisa Marion Herrmann (née Eton) was a New Zealand photographer who owned and operated a large photographic studio on Cuba Street, Wellington.

== Biography ==
Louisa Marion Eton was born in London on 11 June 1864 to Henry Edgar Eton. In 1880, she arrived in New Zealand aboard the Piako.

Her family established in Masterton, where her father ran a successful chemist business named 'HE Eton'. Louisa's family knowledge on chemistry would explain her familiarity to the subject.

Between 1882 and 1883, Eton began working as an assistant at the Connolly and Herrmann photography studio on Lambton Quay, Wellington and continue to work there for seven years.

In October 1890, Louisa married one of owners of the photography studio, Richard Herrmann. In 1890, Richard Herrmann advertised that he opened a photography studio at the corner of Cuba and Dixon Streets, Wellington. Louisa Herrmann is referenced in one of the Wairapa Daily Times' advertisements as available to "receive lady visitors."

In July 1892, Louisa gave birth to a daughter, Inez. In September 1892, her husband died from typhoid. In 1893, she signed the Suffrage petition.

After his death, she operated the Herrmann photographic studio, and hired Fred Muir, who formerly worked in the Dunedin Studio Burton Brothers. She was particularly famous for children's portraits.

By 1897, her landlord built a new building on the corner of Dixon and Cuba streets, where she relocated. The studio had three storeys, two dressing rooms, a waiting room, and separated lady's toilets, which was a novelty around those days. The studio prospered, and she kept posting advertisements on the Wairapa newspapers.

On 10 June 1899, she remarried, Daniel George Wilson, and was known as Louisa Marion Wilson. They had a son, Sizmur Maxwell Wilson.|

When she retired in 1908, the Herrmann photographic studio assets were advertised for sale, including 35,000 negatives. Because of this, the studio's negative strewed and got lost.

She died on 3 June 1955 in Wellington, New Zealand.
