= Mendy Portnoy =

Israeli musician (born 1992)

Mendy Portnoy מנדי פורטנוי
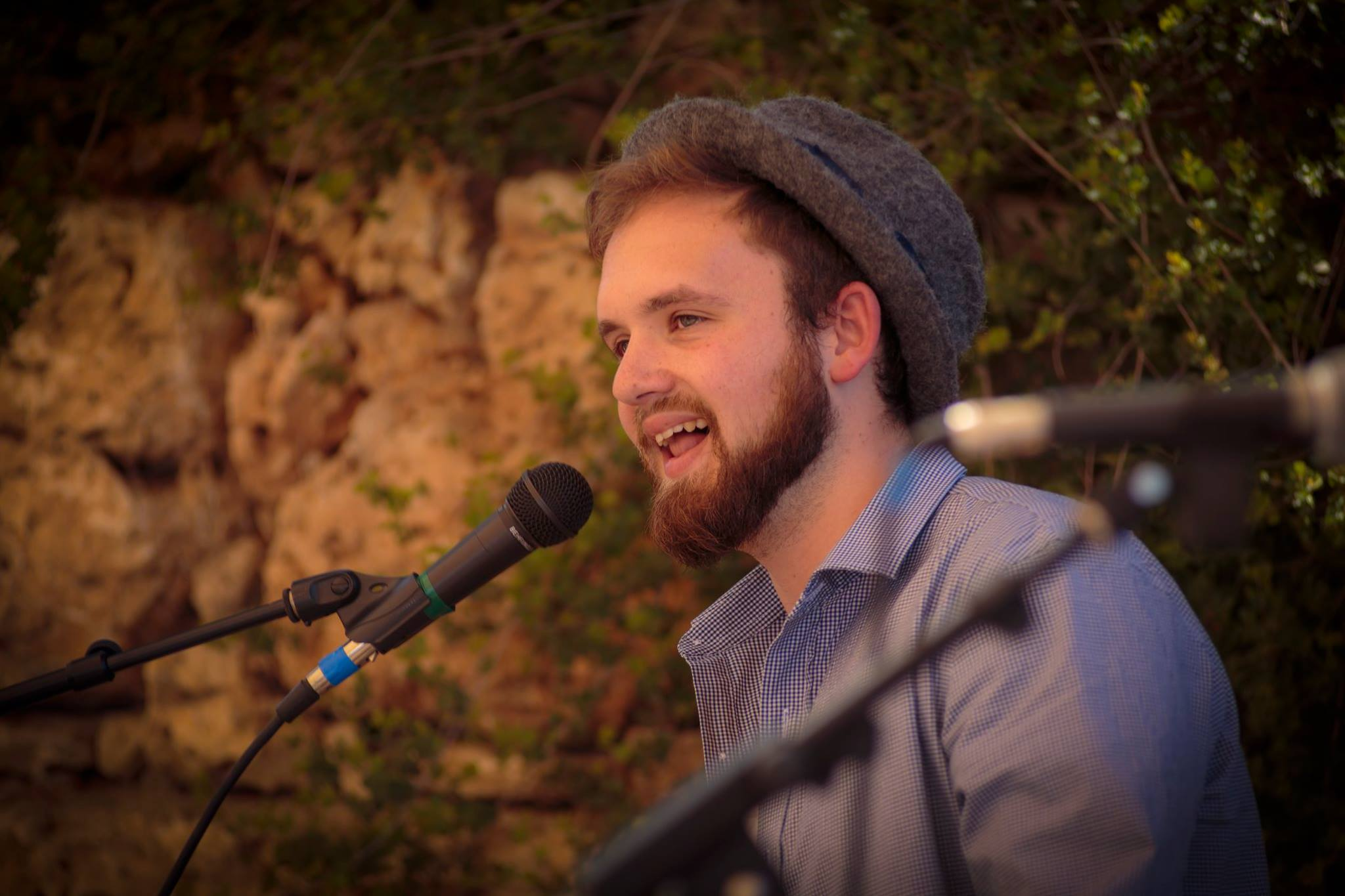

Background information
- Born: April 16, 1992 (age 34); Manchester, England
- Origin: Manchester, England
- Genres: Jewish music, pop rock, folk rock
- Occupations: Singer, producer
- Instruments: Vocals, piano, keyboards
- Years active: 2010–present
- Member of: Portnoy Brothers
- Formerly of: Hamakor
- Website: www.theportnoybrothers.com

Mendy Portnoy (Hebrew: מנדי פורטנוי) is an English-born Israeli singer, pianist, composer, and producer. He is best known as half of the folk rock duo the Portnoy Brothers with his older brother Sruli. He has also released three albums as a solo artist.

== Early life ==
Portnoy was born in Manchester, England, the seventh of nine children. His father is a rabbi and former orchestra conductor. He and six other siblings made aliyah to Israel as adults, however Portnoy and his brother Sruli have since moved to the USA where they currently reside (as of 2024).

Portnoy studied music from a young age and began playing together with Sruli around age 14. He originally took guitar lessons, with Sruli taking piano, before the two switched.

== Career ==
In 2010, he performed at the Complete Unity Concert at Heichal Shlomo alongside Aharit Hayamim, Shtar, and JudaBlue. He and Sruli participated in the music video "Waving Flags", performed by campers and volunteer staff at Camp Simcha.

Mendy Portnoy was featured on composer Yossi Green's 2015 album Pianesque. That same year, he collaborated with singer and saxophonist Daniel Zamir on Esa Einai, an album of Shlomo Carlebach songs, and released a short online-only piano album entitled Holy Days.

He was the final keyboardist for the Jewish rock band Hamakor, performing on their 2014 single "Lift Me Up".

As of 2020, Portnoy moved to New Jersey to work for Jewish grassroots movement and music company Thank You Hashem where he works as a music producer. Portnoy became involved as a producer after Moshe Storch, a musician recording a song with TYH at that time, approached him to produce a song for TYH whilst Portnoy was visiting New York. His arrangement of Shomati/Take Us Home impressed the TYH executives, who had "been struggling to get [that particular] niggun out there". They ultimately decided they wanted Portnoy to run their studio—even though they had yet to build one. He became an integral part of the production team, contributing to every track on the album and has continued in his role ever since.

=== Portnoy Brothers ===
Mendy and Sruli Portnoy began collaborating as the Portnoy Brothers in 2012 with their debut single "Kol Ha'olam". They received further attention in 2014 with their single and music video "Learn to Love". An album of the same name was released in 2016. This was then followed with No Complaints in 2019. The album The Shabbat Project is expected to be released in the near future.

=== Other activities ===
In addition to being an artist and a producer, Portnoy is also a professional editor and photographer and was Ezra Kress's rotator at camp simcha special from 2010-2011.

== Discography ==
=== With Hamakor ===
- "Lift Me Up" (single) (2014)

=== With Portnoy Brothers ===
- Learn to Love (2016)
- No Complaints (2019)
- Returning With Love (2024)

=== Solo albums ===
- Esa Einai: Mendy Portnoy Plays Shlomo Carlebach (with Daniel Zamir) (15 February 2015)
- Holy Days (7 September 2015)
- Introspection: Mendy Portnoy (with Avraham Balti) (September 2020)
- The Chabad Sessions, Vol 1 (2023)
- Redemption (2024)
- At The Gates of Shabbat (2025)

=== Singles ===
- "Yesterday" (Piano cover of The Beatles song of the same name) (2024)
- "BOM BOM BOM" (2024)
- "Oh Chanukah!" (2024)

=== As featured artist ===
- Yossi Green, Pianesque (2015)

=== Other credits ===
- Yerachmiel, "Acheinu" (2014) – piano, arrangement
- Sarah Dukes, "Raining Rockets" (2015) – piano
