= The Portnoy Brothers =

British-Israeli folk rock duo

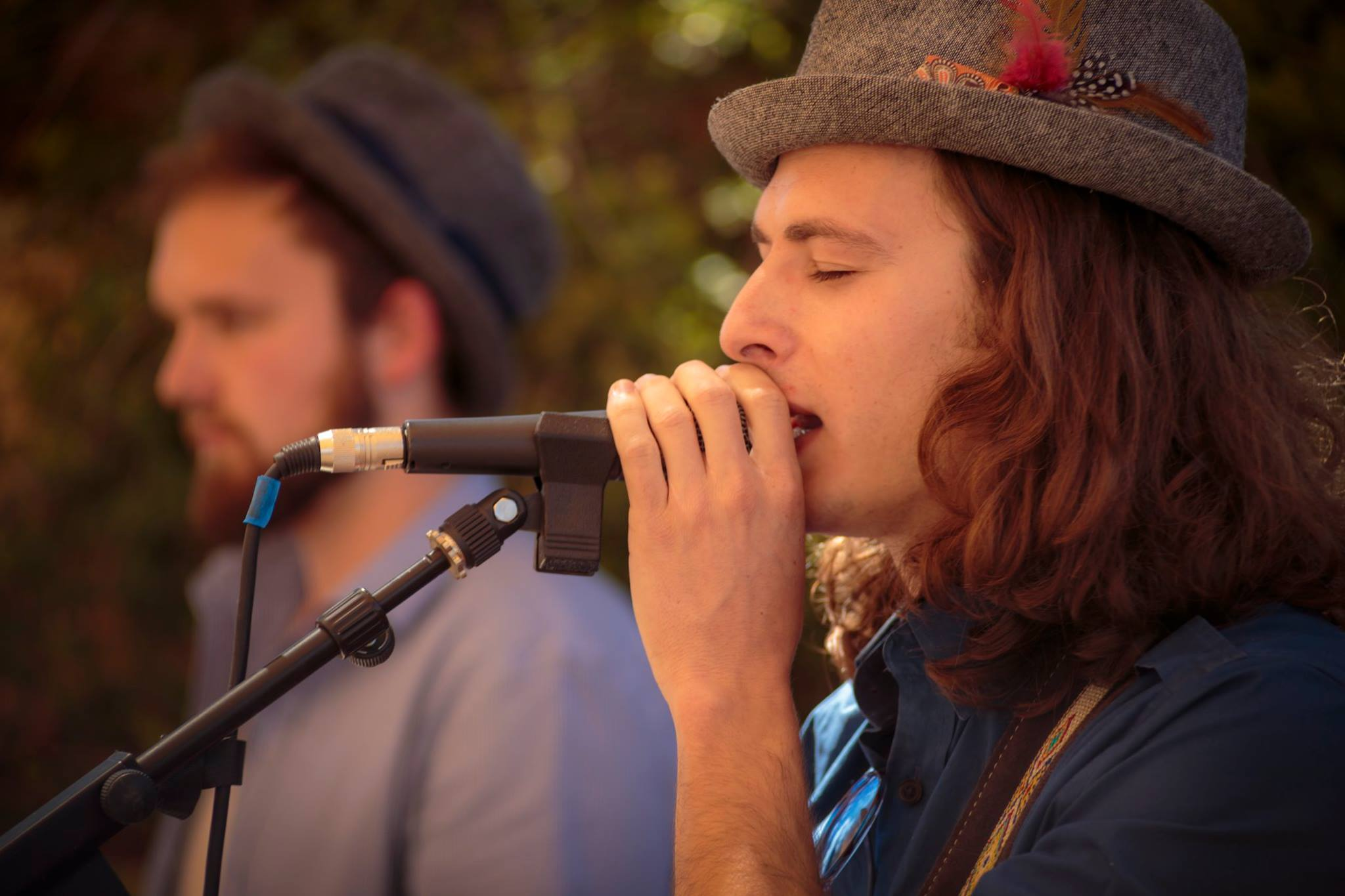
- The Portnoy Brothers, May 2016

Background information
- Origin: Manchester, England
- Genres: Pop rock, folk rock, soul, R&B
- Years active: 2014–present
- Members: Israel Portnoy; Mendy Portnoy
- Website: www.theportnoybrothers.com

The Portnoy Brothers are a British–Israeli folk rock duo formed in 2014 by Manchester-born brothers Israel Portnoy (born 1990; vocals, guitar) and Mendy Portnoy (born 1992; keyboards). Their debut album, as The Portnoy Brothers, Learn to Love, was released independently on 23 September 2016. On 29 March 2019 they released "The Garden Sessions" EP.

== History ==
Israel "Sruli" and Mendy Portnoy were born in Manchester, England, later moving to Israel as adults. Their father was a child soloist and orchestra conductor who studied at the Royal College of Music before eventually receiving semicha and becoming a rabbi. They played music separately from a young age and began playing together at around 14 years old.

The Portnoy brothers began recording their debut album, Learn to Love, in 2013 with bassist and engineer Alon Hillel. The album was co-funded by fans via an Indiegogo campaign, which raised £9,315 GBP. In January 2016, they released a video for the album's closing track, "Timebound", as a tribute to David Bowie shortly after his death. In May 2016, they appeared at the Day to Praise Israel Independence Day event. The album was released on 23 September 2016.

Originally a YouTube series of live performances, The Portnoy Brothers released The Garden Sessions as an EP on 29 March 2019. The release included live renditions of four of the band's songs: 'Old Soul', 'Seeing is Believing', 'Tomorrow's Yesterday' and 'Memories'.

A sophomore album, No Complaints, was released on October 31, 2019. The album was recorded in Nashville, Tennessee, and the band chose the name as a nod to the novel Portnoy's Complaint. The album garnered attention after reaching the Billboard Heatseekers Chart.

Since 2020, they have been releasing songs for their Shabbat Project album. They have recorded songs with Shlomo Katz, Zusha, Yosef Karduner, Amir Alaev, Alex Clare and their father, Joel Portnoy. The projects have accompanying videos on YouTube with some songs available for streaming. The completed album is set to be released soon.

In June of 2024, the band released "October Rain" (written by Keren Peles) which was the original version of the song "Hurricane" sang by Eden Golan at the Eurovision Song Contest 2024 in May of that year. The song contained the unedited lyrics of the Eurovision entry which was forced to revise its lyrics. In September of the same year, they released the album "Returning With Love", containing songs about the upcoming High Holy Days.

== Musical style ==
The Portnoy Brothers have cited The Beatles, Stevie Wonder, and Simon & Garfunkel as musical influences.

== Discography ==
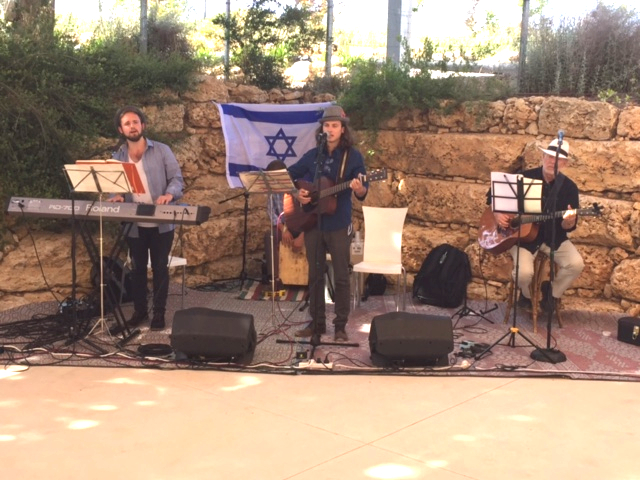
The Portnoy Brothers (left and centre) at the annual Day to Praise Israel Independence Day event, 12 May 2016

=== Albums ===
- Learn to Love (2016)
- No Complaints (2019)
- Returning With Love (2024)

=== Extended plays ===
- The Garden Sessions EP (2019)

=== Singles and music videos ===
- "Kol Ha'Olam" (ft. Gilad B) (2012)
- "Learn to Love" (2014)
- "Memories" (2015)
- "Tomorrow's Yesterday" (2015)
- "Stars Aglow"/"Timebound" (2016)
- "Old Soul" (2018)
- "Spotified" (2019)
- "Sing It Again" (2019)
- "Simple City" (2019)
- "Shalom Aleichem" (ft. Shlomo Katz) (2020)
- "Anim Zemirot" (ft. Zusha) (2020)
- "Yigdal" (2020)
- "Jerusalem of Gold" (2020)
- "Tzadik Katamar" (2020)
- "Yom Shabbaton" (ft. Alex Clare) (2020)
- "Shirat Haasavim" (2021)
- "Etz Chayim" (ft. Joel Portnoy) (2021)
- "Lecha Dodi" (ft. Yosef Karduner) (2023)
- "Adon Olam" (ft. United Synagogue Schools Coronation Choir) (2023)
- "Ohr Ein Sof" (Thank You Hashem, Mendy Worch, The Portnoy Brothers) (2024)
- "October Rain" (2024)
- "Birkat Habanim" (2024)

=== Covers ===
- "Boi Veshalom" (Yaakov Shwekey cover) (2013)
- "Dror Yikra" (Yonatan Razel cover) (2014)
- "Brothers in Arms" (Dire Straits cover) (2016)
- "If I Were A Rich Man" (Fiddler on the Roof cover) (2017)
- "Somewhere Over the Rainbow" (The Wizard of OZ cover) (2018)
- "Nechake Lecha" (Ishay Ribo and Natan Goshen cover) (2019)
