= Mabel Tustin =

New Zealand photographer (1884–1967)

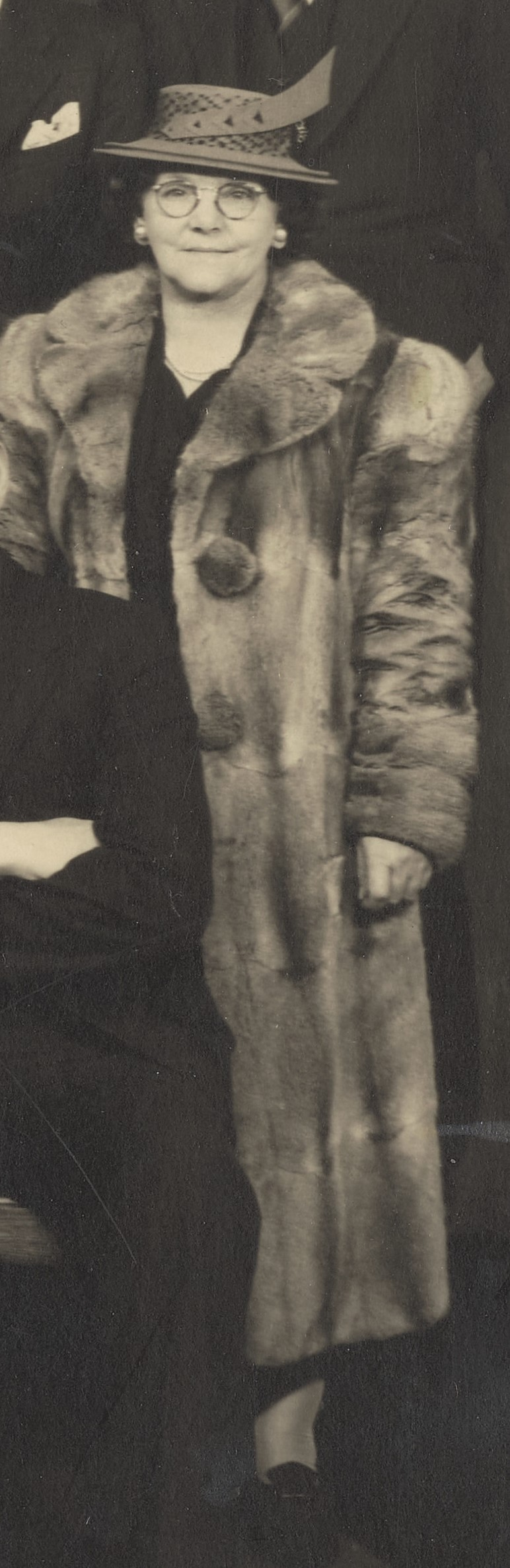
- Born: Emily Mabel Tustin; 25 March 1884
- Died: 9 September 1967 (aged 83); Wellington, New Zealand
- Occupation: Photographer
- Years active: 1921–1940s
- Known for: Portraits and wedding photographs

Emily Mabel Tustin (25 March 1884 – 9 September 1967) was a New Zealand photographer. Her portraits of people and bridal parties are held in the collection of Museum of New Zealand Te Papa Tongarewa.

== Biography ==
Tustin was born on 25 March 1884, the daughter of Harriet Elizabeth Tustin (née Pilcher) and William George Tustin. She grew up in Wellington and attended The Terrace School and Wellington Technical School. She began work at Wrigglesworth & Binns in 1899 until they closed the Wellington studio in 1905. In 1907 after her father was imprisoned, she moved to Whanganui to work at Frank Denton's studio. During the first world war she worked in Wellington in various retouching roles, including government commissions. She ran her portrait photography business, Mabel Trustin's Studio, from premises in central Wellington—initially on Lambton Quay and later on Courtney Place—from 1921 to the mid-1940s. She also exhibited her photographs at the annual Wellington Winter Show.

Tustin died in Wellington in 1967, and her ashes were buried at Karori Cemetery.
