= Ruth McDowall =

New Zealand photographer

Ruth McDowall (born 1984) is a New Zealand photographer who has documented the evolving arms industry and growing violence in and around Jos in central Nigeria. In 2015, she published a photo story based on meetings with Nigerian girls who had escaped capture by Boko Haram.

== Biography ==
Born in Taranaki in 1984, McDowall graduated at the Elam School of Fine Arts in Auckland. She first visited Nigeria in 2008, returning two years later to teach photography to young people living in the risk-prone environment of Jos. Many of them were suffering from post-traumatic stress as a result of the frequent serious violence and death in the area. She documented this in 2011, exhibiting her work at the Lagos Photo Festival in 2012.

Other work by McDowall includes a 2012 documentary series for UNESCO on the nomadic Fula children finding their way to school. The series has been exhibited by the United Nations in New York and Paris. Her photographs have appeared in Time, Newsweek and The New Yorker.

Since 2013, McDowall has been researching the kidnapping of Nigerian girls by Boko Haram, including the 2014 attack on a girls' boarding school at Chibok in northern Nigeria in which over 300 girls were kidnapped. She has published her findings in the form of a photo essay titled Malaiku: Angels based on contacts with girls who have managed to escape.
