= Janet Bayly =

New Zealand artist, photographer, author, curator and gallery director (1955 -)

- Born: 1955 (age 70–71); Tauranga
- Known for: photography, director of Mahara Gallery

Janet Lesley Bayly (born 7 June 1955) is a New Zealand photographer, museum director and curator and is an authority on the works of Frances Hodgkins.

== Early life ==
Bayly was born in Tauranga in 1955 and was educated at Hutt Valley High School and then Elam School of Fine Arts. She completed her bachelor's degree in 1976 and obtained her master's degree in 1979.

== Career ==
In 1982 Bayly was given a QEII Arts Council award and became the first recipient of the Anne C Martindell Young Artists' Award.

Bayly's photographic works are held in the permanent collections of the Museum of New Zealand Te Papa Tongarewa, the Christchurch Art Gallery, and the Sarjeant Gallery.

As at February 2021, Bayly is the director of the Mahara Gallery, the district public gallery for the Kāpiti Coast.

=== Publications ===
- Mirek Smisek 60 Years 60 Pots. Publication co-ordination: Jasmine Bailey, Janet Bayley and Gary Freemantle.
- Songs of Innocence Photographs of a New Zealand Childhood by John Pascoe and edited by Janet Bayley.
