= Israel Portnoy =

Israeli musician (born 1990)

Israel Portnoy ישראל פורטנוי
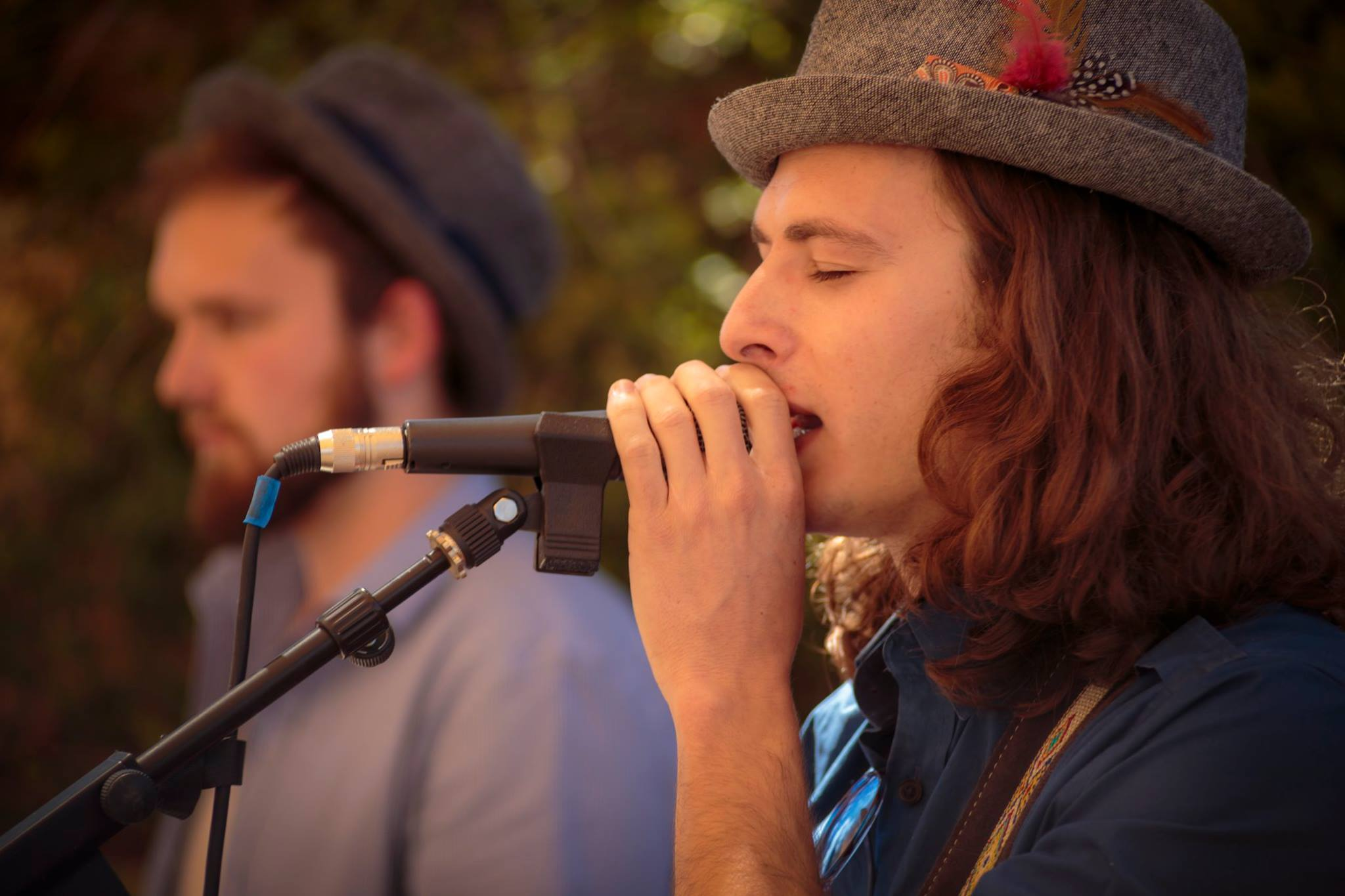
- Sruli (right) singing with Mendy (left) at a Portnoy Brothers gig

Background information
- Also known as: Sruli Portnoy
- Born: September 10, 1990 (age 36); Manchester, England
- Origin: Manchester, England
- Genres: Jewish music, pop rock, folk rock
- Occupations: Singer, songwriter, producer
- Instruments: Vocals, guitar, keyboards
- Years active: 2010–present
- Label: Independent
- Member of: The Portnoy Brothers
- Website: www.israelportnoymusic.com

Israel "Sruli" Portnoy (Hebrew: ישראל "שרולי" פורטנוי) is an English-born Israeli singer, songwriter and guitarist. He is best known as half of the band The Portnoy Brothers with his younger brother Mendy. He also has a solo career and has released albums as a solo artist, most notably Facing Flames ft. Guilda, which was released in the aftermath of a forest fire burning his home in the village of Mevo Modi'im.

== Early life ==
Portnoy was born in Manchester, England, as the sixth of nine children. His father is a rabbi and former orchestra conductor. He and five other siblings made aliyah to Israel as adults, though, as of August 2023, Portnoy has been residing in the United States.

He and his brother Mendy studied music from a young age and began playing together around age 14, though Sruli said he began "making up songs" from as early as age 6. He originally took piano lessons, with Mendy taking guitar, before the two switched.

At age 16, Portnoy moved to Israel to study at yeshiva but said that he "spent most of [his] time in [his] room with [his] guitar" and subsequently left to study at Tel Aviv Cantorial Institute and later on the Rimon School for Jazz & Contemporary Music for a year and a half before leaving to find more creative freedom.

Portnoy performed on Israeli interactive reality singing competition Rising Star in 2022 advancing beyond the first round.

== Discography ==
=== With Portnoy Brothers ===
- Learn to Love (2016)
- No Complaints (2019)

=== Albums ===
- Facing Flames (2021)
- House of Prayer (in collaboration with Thank You Hashem) (2025)

=== Extended plays ===
- Guilda LIVE Lookout Session (Guilda Live) EP (2023)

=== Singles ===
- "Peace of Prayer / Shalom" (2020)
- "Aura" (2023)
- "Mi Haish" (as a featured artist with Nissim Black and The Niggun Project) (2023)
- "Baby Boo" (2023)
- "Heart & Soul Medley" (Thank You Hashem, Israel Portnoy) (2024)
- "Shalom (Live at Zion Gate)" (2024)
- "IMADI" (as part of his upcoming album Poetry in Prayer) (2024)
- "HASHIVENU" (as part of his upcoming album Poetry in Prayer) (2024)
- "Seed of Abraham" featuring Hasidic Billboard Charting Artist, Moshe Reuven (2024)
- "GESHEM / LET IT RAIN" (as part of his upcoming album Poetry in Prayer) (2025)
- "Yizkor / Let Us Remember" (as part of his upcoming album Poetry in Prayer) (2025)
- "NEW DAY WILL RISE" (Thank You Hashem, Israel Portnoy, a cover of Yuval Raphael's single with the same name) (2025)
