= Norah Carter =

New Zealand photographer, photographic studio owner and painter (1881–1966)

- Born: 15 April 1881; New Zealand
- Died: 8 February 1966 (aged 84); Sydney, New South Wales, Australia
- Known for: Photography

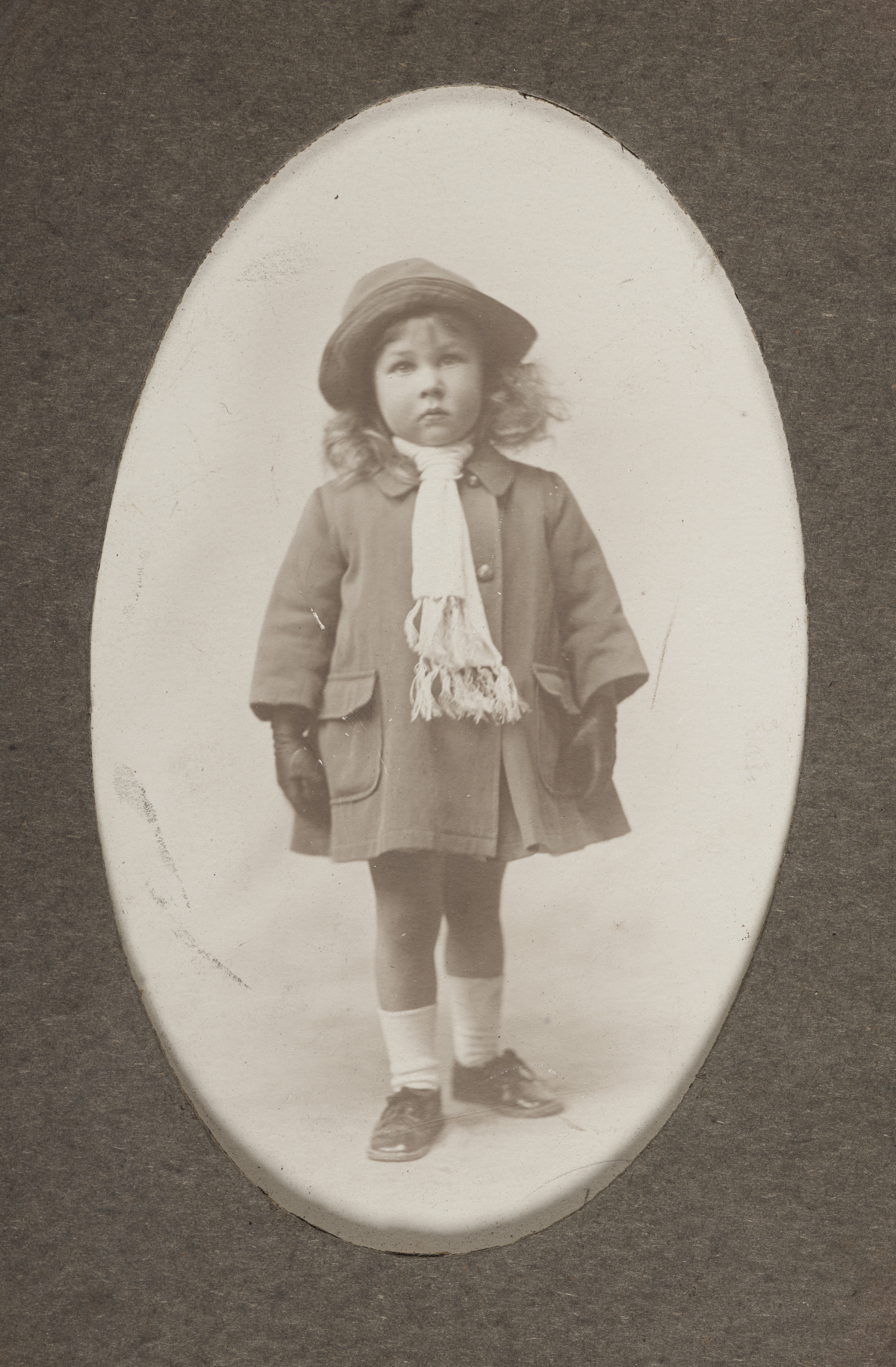
Young girl standing, 1910–1919, Gisborne, by Norah Carter

Norah Carter (15 April 1881 – 8 February 1966) was a New Zealand photographer. Her work is held in the permanent collection of the Museum of New Zealand Te Papa Tongarewa.

== Early life ==
Carter was born on 15 April 1881, to Anna Margaret Begg and Richard Carter, a customs inspector who was stationed in Napier at the time. She studied drawing and art at Wellington Technical School and in Melbourne, Australia.

== Career ==
In 1907, Carter opened a studio in Christchurch, specialising in miniature painting and photography. In 1910, she moved to Gisborne, in the North Island of New Zealand, and opened a photographic studio there. She closed the business in 1919.

Carter died in Sydney, Australia, on 8 February 1966.
