= Matilde Marín =

Argentine artist

Matilde Marín (born 1948) is a contemporary Argentine artist who works in photography, engraving and video.

== Early life and education ==
Matilde Marín grew up in Buenos Aires and obtained her degree in sculpture at the School of Fine Arts Prilidiano Pueyrredon from Buenos Aires. She continued her education in engraving at the Kunstgewerbeschule - Zurich University of the Arts.

She has received the Platinum Konex Award in engraving (1992) and in printmaking (2002).

== Work ==
Marin stated that her role as an artist is to be an active witness of historical and social events. She creates work about the world we inhabit, situations that relate to climate change, and the natural or artificial alteration of landscape. She began working under printmaking media and during the early 1990s shifted her practice working exclusively with video, photography.

During the 1980s, Marín was deeply involved in the graphic world, focusing on exploring non-conventional media and introducing different techniques for printing and book work. In 1984 she created Grupo Seis with the artist Alicia Díaz Rinaldi with the intention of breaking the boundaries of printmaking media. The group was invited as guest of honor by Art Historian Mari Carmen Ramírez to take part in the Puerto Rico Biennial (1988).

Marín took part in the Cuenca Biennial in Ecuador (2001), Curitiba Biennial in Brazil (2015), Jerusalem Biennial in Israel (2015), Karachi Biennale in Pakistan (2017), Bienal Sur in Argentina (2019), Havana Biennial in Cuba (2019), Bienal Sur in Saudi Arabia (2021).

== Selected solo exhibitions ==
- 2022 25FPS at Galería Del Infinito Arte Buenos Aires, Argentina
- 2019 Cuando divise el Humo Azul de Ítaca at Galería Del Infinito Arte, Buenos Aires, Argentina
- 2017 Arqueología de sí misma at Fundación OSDE, Buenos Aires, Argentina
- 2016 Paisajes Indeterminados at Galería Patricia Ready, Santiago de Chile Chile
- 2014 Una línea continua, temas sobre el paisaje at Museo Nacional de Bellas Artes, Neuquén, Argentina

== Selected collections ==
- MALBA - The Latin American Art Museum of Buenos Aires, Argentina
- Art Museum of the Americas, Washington DC.
- Citibank Art Collection, New York, NY
- Bienal de Cuenca, Ecuador

== Personal life ==
Marin has lived in Venezuela, United States, Switzerland and has lived in Buenos Aires since 1980.
