= Susana Thénon =

Argentine avant-garde poet, translator and artistic photographer

Susana Thénon (Buenos Aires, 1935–1991) was an Argentine avant-garde poet, translator, and artistic photographer.

The daughter of the psychiatrist Jorge Thénon, she was a member of Argentina's Generación del ’60. Although she was a contemporary of Juana Bignozzi and Alejandra Pizarnik, Thenon was not part of any literary group. She affiliated within the marginal construction that works in her poetry, without adhering to any reigning movement.

Her relationship with other poets of her generation was minimal, with the exceptions of Maria Negroni, who later became one of the compilers in Thenon's posthumous books (La Morada Impossible I and II) and the aforementioned Pizarnik with which she frequented, and along with that published in the literary journal Agua Viva (1960), which was perhaps one of the few signs of her openness to the poetic environment. A gap in her publications occurred between 1970 and 1982 when she was actively engaged in photography, although she continued to write during that period. Thenon also wrote some essays.

== Bibliography ==
- Balmer, Josephine (26 September 2013). Piecing Together the Fragments: Translating Classical Verse, Creating Contemporary Poetry. OUP Oxford. ISBN 978-0-19-958509-0.
- Rodríguez, Ileana; Szurmuk, Mónica (31 October 2015). The Cambridge History of Latin American Women's Literature. Cambridge University Press. ISBN 978-1-316-41910-6.
- Thénon, Susana. La Morada Imposible, Tomo I. Edición a cargo de Ana María Barrenechea y María Negroni. Buenos Aires, Corregidor, 2001. (in Spanish)
- Brief biography and poems by Susana Thénon
- La “quebrada geometría” de Edad sin tregua de Susana Thénon by Mariana Di Ció, Universidad Católica Argentina, Universidad de Paris IV - Sorbonne (in Spanish)
