= Felicia Walmsley =

New Zealand doctor and photographer

Sarah Margaret Felicia Walmsley (1895 – 1971) was a New Zealand doctor and photographer.

== Photography ==
Walmsley was a member of the Dunedin Photographic Society and wrote "A History of the Dunedin Photographic Society" which was published in the Australasian Photo Review in 1920. She was accomplished in portraiture and artificial light photography winning prizes for her photos. In 1916, she won a prize in the Dunedin Photographic Society competitions for her photo in the Seascape category entitled Evening Shadows. In 1917, she won the first prize in the A.P.-R. Architectural Competition for her photo of cathedral pillars and first prize for Lilies, a portrait of a woman holding lilies, in the A.P.-R. Home portrait or group competition.

Following a trip to Fiji and Tonga in 1916 she had an essay on photography "To the "Summer isles of Eden" with a vest pocket Kodak" published in the Australasian Photo Review in 1918. It described the photography techniques and methods she adopted after her half-plate camera was damaged and she had to rely on a Kodak Vest Pocket folding camera. It seems most likely that she gave up art photography early in her medical career.

== Medical career ==
In 1919 Walmsley was studying at university and in 1922, as a third year medical student, was one of ten women medical students including Muriel Bell and Helen Deem. She qualified with her MB ChB in 1926. In January 1928, she was appointed as a house surgeon at Gore Hospital moving to the same position at Timaru Hospital in August 1928.

She gained a Diploma in Public Health from the University of London in 1931. In 1932, she was appointed as assistant pathologist at the Royal Sussex County Hospital in Brighton. By 1935 she had returned to New Zealand to a position as house surgeon at Southland Hospital.

Walmsley worked at Mount Coolon in North Queensland. In 1936 she married Percival Raymond Fortescue Meredith, a former lieutenant with the RAMC, at Bowen in North Queensland. Their nine year old son Evian Glendower Walmsley Meredith drowned in an accident in Dunedin in 1946. At that time she was working as medical officer of health in Timaru.

Walmsley died overseas in 1971. Probate on her will was granted in December 1971 in Dunedin.
