= Ana Portnoy =

Argentine photographer (1950–2020)

- Born: 1950; Buenos Aires, Argentina
- Died: May 30, 2020 (aged 69–70); Barcelona, Spain
- Occupation: Photographer

Ana Portnoy (1950 - May 30, 2020) was an Argentine photographer. Born in Buenos Aires, she went into exile in Spain in 1977. She took photographs of many authors, including Andreu Martín, Juan Marsé, Maruja Torres, Javier Cercas, Claudia Piñeiro, Clara Obligado, Guillermo Martínez, Rodrigo Fresán, Mariana Enriquez, James Ellroy, Petros Márkaris, Alejandra Costamagna, Colm Tóibin, and Ida Vitale.
