= Constanza Portnoy =

Argentine photographer

- Born: 1980s Buenos Aires
- Education: University of Buenos Aires
- Occupation: Photojournalist

Constanza Portnoy (born 1980s) is an Argentine photographer and photojournalist who has won a number of international awards. She was selected as Photographer of the Year 2017 by the Tokyo International Foto Awards, was the 2018 laureate of the French-based International Women Photographers Association, and in August 2018 was the winner of the Beca Oxfam FNPI award for journalism on gender inequality.

== Biography ==
Born in Buenos Aires in the 1980s, Portnoy studied psychology at the University of Buenos Aires, graduating when she was 23. While working with children and older people with disabilities, she became aware of problems stemming from their lack of family connections and the failure of health policies and disability laws. She found that by taking up photography, she was able to communicate their distress and fight for improvements. Her expertise in the art is self-developed with no formal training. She then became involved in photography as a basis for documentary research, combining psychology with photography.

Her series of photographs titled Fuerza de la vida (Life Force) includes Jorge, a victim of thalidomide treatment, together with his wife, Vera, and a five-year-old daughter who both have physical impediments. The couple fell in love eight years ago and decided to get married. In the face of a cold, external climate insensitive to their disabilities, she discovered a more friendly internal atmosphere open to relationships empowering life.

She has participated in many exhibitions both in Argentina and abroad.

== Awards ==
Portnoy has won a number of important awards for her photography, including Photographer of the Year 2017 by the Tokyo International Foto Awards, 2018 laureate of the French-based International Women Photographers Association, and 2018 winner of the Beca Oxfam FNPI award for journalism on gender inequality. She was also the winner of the 2018 Alfred Fried Photography Award.
