= Marion Kirker =

New Zealand photographer (1881–1971)

- Born: 1 July 1884; Adelaide
- Died: 1971 (aged 86–87); Auckland

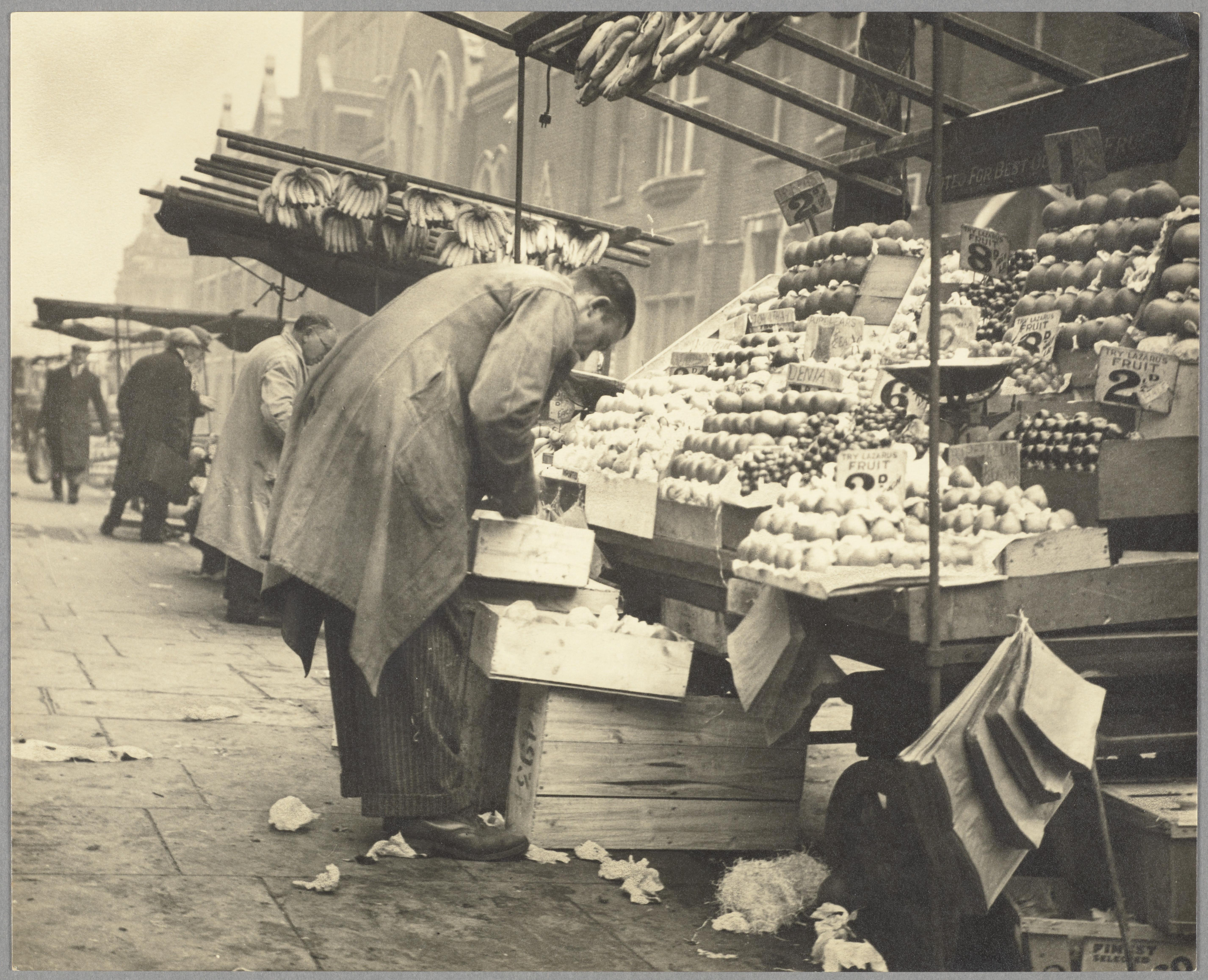
Street vendor, London, circa 1935–1939, United Kingdom, by Marion Queenie Kirker. Gift of Anne Kirker, 1993. Te Papa (O.039028)

Marion Queenie Kirker (1881–1971) was a New Zealand photographer. Her work is held in the collection of the Museum of New Zealand Te Papa Tongarewa.

== Biography ==
Kirker was born in Adelaide, South Australia, in 1881. She left New Zealand in the mid-1920s and moved to London to learn the Bromoil printmaking process in 1934. Using this process she was able to creatively manipulate the look of her prints. In 1937 she became a member of the Royal Photographic Society and later the same year was elected to Associate membership. In 1938 she was awarded a medal by the Cripplegate Photographic Society in their annual print competition.

Kirker later returned to New Zealand and began using a Paxette camera to produce work in the new colour snapshot format.

Kirker died in 1971.
