= Albury (disambiguation) =

Albury is a city in New South Wales, Australia.

Albury may also refer to:

== Places ==
=== Australia ===
- Electoral district of Albury, an electoral district in the New South Wales Legislative Assembly
- City of Albury, which governs Albury
- Albury railway station, in New South Wales, Australia

=== United Kingdom ===
- Albury, Hertfordshire, England
- Albury, Oxfordshire, England
- Albury, Surrey, England
  - Albury Park, Surrey, England
- Albury End, Hertfordshire, England
- Albury Heath, Surrey, England
- Albury Street, in Deptford, London

=== Other places ===
- Albury, New Zealand
- Albury, Ontario, Canada

== Other uses ==
- Albury (surname)
- HMS Albury
- Albury, British sailing ship
- Albury line, Australian rail service

== See also ==
- Aldbury
