= Grade I and II* listed buildings in the London Borough of Lewisham =

There are over 9,000 Grade I listed buildings and 20,000 Grade II* listed buildings in England. This page is a list of these buildings in the London Borough of Lewisham.

== Grade I ==
| Name | Location | Type | Completed (Note: The date given is the date used by Historic England as significant for the initial building or that of an important part in the structure's description.) | Date designated | Grid ref. (Note: Sometimes known as OSGB36, the grid reference is based on the British national grid reference system used by the Ordnance Survey.) Geo-coordinates | Entry number (Note: The "List Entry Number" is a unique number assigned to each listed building and scheduled monument by Historic England.) | Image |
|---|---|---|---|---|---|---|---|
| Boone's Chapel (with Short Abutting Wall to East) | Lee High Road, Lewisham | Chapel | Founded circa 1680–83 | 30 August 1954 | TQ3924875209; 51°27′31″N 0°00′11″E | 1079981 | Boone's Chapel (with Short Abutting Wall to East) More images |
| Church of St Paul | Deptford Church St, Lewisham | Church | 18th century | 5 July 1950 | TQ3728677480; 51°28′47″N 0°01′28″W | 1080003 | Church of St Paul More images |

== Grade II* ==
| Name | Location | Type | Completed | Date designated | Grid ref. Geo-coordinates | Entry number | Image |
|---|---|---|---|---|---|---|---|
| Beckenham Place Mansion | Beckenham, Lewisham | Country House | About 1773 | 28 May 1954 | TQ3785970706; 51°25′07″N 0°01′08″W | 1359317 | Beckenham Place Mansion More images |
| Church of St Andrew | Sandhurst Road, Lewisham | Church | 1921–1937 | 12 March 1973 | TQ3899373331; 51°26′31″N 0°00′05″W | 1079974 | Church of St Andrew More images |
| Church of St Bartholomew | Westwood Hill, Lewisham | Church | 1827–32 | 30 August 1954 | TQ3510271670; 51°25′41″N 0°03′29″W | 1285801 | Church of St Bartholomew More images |
| Church of St Margaret | Lee Terrace, Lewisham | Church | 1813–14 | 30 August 1954 | TQ3909275658; 51°27′46″N 0°00′03″E | 1193189 | Church of St Margaret More images |
| Church of St Mary the Virgin | Lewisham High Street, Lewisham | Church | 1498 | 30 August 1954 | TQ3794174833; 51°27′20″N 0°00′58″W | 1193297 | Church of St Mary the Virgin More images |
| Church of the Ascension | Dartmouth Row, Lewisham | Church | World War II | 30 August 1954 | TQ3841276509; 51°28′14″N 0°00′31″W | 1192114 | Church of the Ascension More images |
| Colonnade House | South Row, Lewisham | House | c. 1795 | 30 August 1954 | TQ3979276405; 51°28′10″N 0°00′40″E | 1079932 | Colonnade House More images |
| Former Master Shipwright's House at Royal Dockyard, Deptford | Deptford, Lewisham | House | Late C20 | 3 February 1993 | TQ3721378123; 51°29′08″N 0°01′31″W | 1213984 | Former Master Shipwright's House at Royal Dockyard, Deptford More images |
| Former Office Building of Royal Dockyard, Deptford | Deptford, Lewisham | House | Late C20 | 3 February 1993 | TQ3719778105; 51°29′07″N 0°01′32″W | 1288808 | Former Office Building of Royal Dockyard, Deptford More images |
| Hillyfields Sixth Form Centre | Eastern Road, Brockley, Lewisham | School | 1884-5 | 27 April 1992 | TQ3723475213; 51°27′33″N 0°01′34″W | 1252990 | Hillyfields Sixth Form Centre More images |
| Horniman Museum | Forest Hill, Lewisham | Museum | 1902 | 12 March 1973 | TQ3487073101; 51°26′27″N 0°03′39″W | 1079996 | Horniman Museum More images |
| Manor House Library (formerly Lee Public Library) | Lee | House | 1771-2 | 30 August 1954 | TQ3936275052; 51°27′26″N 0°00′16″E | 1079968 | Manor House Library (formerly Lee Public Library) More images |
| Monument of Sir John Call, 1st Baronet, Lee Old Churchyard | Lee | Obelisk | c. 1801 | 1 June 2007 | TQ3900075000; 51°27′25″N 0°00′03″W | 1391996 | Monument of Sir John Call, 1st Baronet, Lee Old Churchyard More images |
| No. 13 and 15 Albury Street | Deptford, Lewisham | House | Early 18th century | 19 October 1951 | TQ3720177596; 51°28′50″N 0°01′32″W | 1358938 | No. 13 and 15 Albury Street |
| No. 17 Albury Street | Deptford, Lewisham | House | Early 18th century | 19 October 1951 | TQ3720977597; 51°28′50″N 0°01′32″W | 1079072 | No. 17 Albury Street |
| No. 19 and 21 Albury Street | Deptford, Lewisham | House | Early 18th century | 19 October 1951 | TQ3721777598; 51°28′51″N 0°01′31″W | 1079073 | No. 19 and 21 Albury Street |
| No. 23-27 Albury Street | Deptford, Lewisham | House | Early 18th century | 19 October 1951 | TQ3722877599; 51°28′51″N 0°01′31″W | 1358939 | No. 23-27 Albury Street More images |
| No. 29 and 31 Albury Street | Deptford, Lewisham | House | Early 18th century | 19 October 1951 | TQ3724777600; 51°28′51″N 0°01′30″W | 1079074 | No. 29 and 31 Albury Street More images |
| No. 33 Albury Street | Deptford, Lewisham | House | Early 18th century | 19 October 1951 | TQ3725777601; 51°28′51″N 0°01′29″W | 1358940 | No. 33 Albury Street |
| No. 34-40 Albury Street | Deptford, Lewisham | Terrace | Early 18th century | 5 July 1950 | TQ3728377588; 51°28′50″N 0°01′28″W | 1080023 | No. 34-40 Albury Street More images |
| No. 35 Albury Street | Deptford, Lewisham | House | Early 18th century | 19 October 1951 | TQ3726577602; 51°28′51″N 0°01′29″W | 1079075 | No. 35 Albury Street More images |
| No. 37 Albury Street | Deptford, Lewisham | House | Early 18th century | 19 October 1951 | TQ3727477603; 51°28′51″N 0°01′28″W | 1079076 | No. 37 Albury Street |
| No. 43 Albury Street | Deptford, Lewisham | House | Early 18th century | 19 October 1951 | TQ3729077605; 51°28′51″N 0°01′28″W | 1079077 | No. 43 Albury Street More images |
| Perceval House Spencer House | Dartmouth Row, Lewisham | House | About 1690 | 30 August 1954 | TQ3842476533; 51°28′15″N 0°00′30″W | 1358448 | Perceval House Spencer House More images |
| St Mary's Vicarage | Lewisham High Street, Lewisham | Vicarage | Late 17th century | 30 August 1954 | TQ3802474949; 51°27′24″N 0°00′53″W | 1286235 | St Mary's Vicarage More images |
| Stone House | 281 Lewisham Way, Lewisham SE4 1XF | Villa | c1771-3 | 5 July 1950 | TQ3726576251; 51°28′07″N 0°01′31″W | 1193368 | Stone House More images |
| The Fludyer Tomb, Lee Old Churchyard | Lee, Lewisham | Chest Tomb | c. 1769 | 1 June 2007 | TQ3902175704; 51°27′48″N 0°00′01″W | 1391993 | The Fludyer Tomb, Lee Old Churchyard |
| The Pagoda | Pagoda Gardens, Lewisham SE3 | House | 1954 | 30 August 1954 | TQ3878476227; 51°28′05″N 0°00′12″W | 1079970 | The Pagoda |
