= Winscombe, New Zealand =

Coordinates: 44°00′S 170°50′E

Winscombe is a lightly populated locality in the southern part of the Canterbury region of New Zealand's South Island. It is situated inland from Timaru on State Highway 8 between Pleasant Point and Fairlie. It is located in a very rural setting.

The village is notable for being the terminus of what became the Fairlie Branch railway line for a brief period. On 24 August 1883, the railway was extended to Winscombe from Albury and its terminus remained in Winscombe until the line was opened to Eversley, just beyond Fairlie, on 9 January 1884. The railway closed in 1968, but some of the old formation can still be seen passing through the countryside around Winscombe.
