= Levels Valley =

- Rural Area
- Interactive map of Levels Valley
- Coordinates: 44.310°S 171.102°E
- Country: New Zealand
- Region: Canterbury
- Territorial authority: Timaru District
- Ward: Pleasant Point-Temuka Ward
- Community: Pleasant Point
- Electorates: Rangitata; Te Tai Tonga (Māori)

Government
  - Territorial authority: Timaru District Council
  - Regional council: Environment Canterbury
  - Mayor of Timaru: Nigel Bowen
  - Rangitata MP: James Meager
  - Te Tai Tonga MP: Tākuta Ferris

Area
  - Total: 58.83 km^{2} (22.71 sq mi)

Population (2023 census)
  - Total: 519
  - Density: 8.82/km^{2} (22.8/sq mi)
- Time zone: UTC+12 (NZST)
  - Summer (DST): UTC+13 (NZDT)
- Postcode: 7983
- Area code: 03
- Local iwi: Ngāi Tahu

Levels Valley is a small rural community in the Timaru District, New Zealand. It is located south-west of Pleasant Point and north-west of Timaru. Papaka Stream runs through the area.

== Demographics ==
Levels Valley locality covers 58.83 km^{2} (22.71 sq mi). It is partly in the Levels Valley statistical area and partly in the Hadlow statistical area.

Historical population of Levels Valley locality
| Year | Pop. | ±% p.a. |
|---|---|---|
| 2006 | 402 | — |
| 2013 | 426 | +0.83% |
| 2018 | 489 | +2.80% |
| 2023 | 519 | +1.20% |

The locality had a population of 519 in the 2023 New Zealand census, an increase of 30 people (6.1%) since the 2018 census, and an increase of 93 people (21.8%) since the 2013 census. There were 267 males and 243 females in 186 dwellings. 1.2% of people identified as LGBTIQ+. There were 120 people (23.1%) aged under 15 years, 63 (12.1%) aged 15 to 29, 255 (49.1%) aged 30 to 64, and 81 (15.6%) aged 65 or older.

People could identify as more than one ethnicity. The results were 94.8% European (Pākehā), 9.2% Māori, 0.6% Pasifika, 0.6% Asian, and 2.3% other, which includes people giving their ethnicity as "New Zealander". English was spoken by 98.3%, Māori by 0.6%, and other languages by 3.5%. No language could be spoken by 1.7% (e.g. too young to talk). The percentage of people born overseas was 12.1, compared with 28.8% nationally.

The sole religious affiliation given was 39.9% Christian. People who answered that they had no religion were 56.6%, and 3.5% of people did not answer the census question.

Of those at least 15 years old, 87 (21.8%) people had a bachelor's or higher degree, 255 (63.9%) had a post-high school certificate or diploma, and 72 (18.0%) people exclusively held high school qualifications. 54 people (13.5%) earned over $100,000 compared to 12.1% nationally. The employment status of those at least 15 was 234 (58.6%) full-time, 78 (19.5%) part-time, and 3 (0.8%) unemployed.

=== Levels Valley statistical area ===
The Levels Valley statistical area, which also includes Totara Valley and Cave, covers 386.38 km^{2} (149.18 sq mi). It had an estimated population of 1,090 as of June 2025, with a population density of 3 people per km^{2}.

Historical population for the statistical area
| Year | Pop. | ±% p.a. |
|---|---|---|
| 2006 | 945 | — |
| 2013 | 1,014 | +1.01% |
| 2018 | 1,044 | +0.58% |
| 2023 | 1,062 | +0.34% |

Levels Valley statistical area had a population of 1,062 in the 2023 New Zealand census, an increase of 18 people (1.7%) since the 2018 census, and an increase of 48 people (4.7%) since the 2013 census. There were 546 males, 513 females, and 3 people of other genders in 417 dwellings. 1.1% of people identified as LGBTIQ+. The median age was 46.6 years (compared with 38.1 years nationally). There were 201 people (18.9%) aged under 15 years, 132 (12.4%) aged 15 to 29, 519 (48.9%) aged 30 to 64, and 204 (19.2%) aged 65 or older.

People could identify as more than one ethnicity. The results were 92.9% European (Pākehā); 7.9% Māori; 0.8% Pasifika; 2.5% Asian; 1.7% Middle Eastern, Latin American and African New Zealanders (MELAA); and 4.5% other, which includes people giving their ethnicity as "New Zealander". English was spoken by 98.9%, Māori by 1.1%, and other languages by 5.4%. No language could be spoken by 0.8% (e.g. too young to talk). New Zealand Sign Language was known by 0.3%. The percentage of people born overseas was 14.1, compared with 28.8% nationally.

Religious affiliations were 38.4% Christian, 0.3% Buddhist, 0.6% Jewish, and 0.8% other religions. People who answered that they had no religion were 52.8%, and 7.3% of people did not answer the census question.

Of those at least 15 years old, 150 (17.4%) people had a bachelor's or higher degree, 519 (60.3%) had a post-high school certificate or diploma, and 192 (22.3%) people exclusively held high school qualifications. The median income was $43,600, compared with $41,500 nationally. 87 people (10.1%) earned over $100,000 compared to 12.1% nationally. The employment status of those at least 15 was 468 (54.4%) full-time, 153 (17.8%) part-time, and 12 (1.4%) unemployed.
