= Little Opawa River =

Coordinates: 44°14′S 170°52′E

- Location of the mouth within New Zealand

Location
- Country: New Zealand

Physical characteristics
- Mouth
  - location: Tengawai River
- Length: 18 km (11 mi)

The Little Opawa River is a river of the south Canterbury region of New Zealand's South Island. It flows generally east from a ridge 20 kilometres (12 mi) southwest of Fairlie, joining with its southern neighbour, the Ōpaoa River very close to their joint outflow into the Tengawai River, close to the settlement of Albury.

== See also ==
- List of rivers of New Zealand
