= Totara Valley =

- Rural Area
- Interactive map of Totara Valley
- Coordinates: 44.229°S 171.008°E
- Country: New Zealand
- Region: Canterbury
- Territorial authority: Timaru District
- Ward: Pleasant Point-Temuka
- Community: Pleasant Point
- Electorates: Waitaki; Te Tai Tonga (Māori)

Government
  - Territorial authority: Timaru District Council
  - Regional council: Environment Canterbury
  - Mayor of Timaru: Nigel Bowen
  - Waitaki MP: Miles Anderson
  - Te Tai Tonga MP: Tākuta Ferris

Area
  - Total: 102.77 km^{2} (39.68 sq mi)
- Elevation: 108 m (354 ft)

Population (2023 census)
  - Total: 264
  - Density: 2.57/km^{2} (6.65/sq mi)
- Time zone: UTC+12 (NZST)
  - Summer (DST): UTC+13 (NZDT)
- Postcode: 7982
- Area code: 03
- Local iwi: Ngāi Tahu

Totara Valley is a small rural community in the Timaru District, New Zealand. It is located north-west of Pleasant Point and east of Albury. The Ōpihi River runs through the area.

== Demographics ==
Totara Valley covers 102.77 km^{2} (39.68 sq mi). It is part of the Levels Valley statistical area.

Historical population
Year	Pop.	±% p.a.
2006	219	—
2013	237	+1.13%
2018	261	+1.95%
2023	264	+0.23%

Totara Valley had a population of 264 in the 2023 New Zealand census, an increase of 3 people (1.1%) since the 2018 census, and an increase of 27 people (11.4%) since the 2013 census. There were 135 males and 126 females in 114 dwellings. 1.1% of people identified as LGBTIQ+. There were 45 people (17.0%) aged under 15 years, 30 (11.4%) aged 15 to 29, 141 (53.4%) aged 30 to 64, and 45 (17.0%) aged 65 or older.

People could identify as more than one ethnicity. The results were 85.2% European (Pākehā); 6.8% Māori; 8.0% Asian; 4.5% Middle Eastern, Latin American and African New Zealanders (MELAA); and 2.3% other, which includes people giving their ethnicity as "New Zealander". English was spoken by 98.9%, Māori by 3.4%, and other languages by 12.5%. New Zealand Sign Language was known by 1.1%. The percentage of people born overseas was 21.6, compared with 28.8% nationally.

Religious affiliations were 44.3% Christian, and 2.3% other religions. People who answered that they had no religion were 45.5%, and 8.0% of people did not answer the census question.

Of those at least 15 years old, 51 (23.3%) people had a bachelor's or higher degree, 135 (61.6%) had a post-high school certificate or diploma, and 39 (17.8%) people exclusively held high school qualifications. 21 people (9.6%) earned over $100,000 compared to 12.1% nationally. The employment status of those at least 15 was 111 (50.7%) full-time, 42 (19.2%) part-time, and 6 (2.7%) unemployed.
