= Albury (surname) =

Albury is a surname. It derives from the Middle English ald ("old") plus burgh ("stronghold or fortified town"). Places called "Albury", "Aldbury", and "Aldborough" are currently or were formerly found in several counties in England. Notable people with the surname include:

- Andy Albury (born 1961), Australian murderer
- Bill Albury (footballer) (born 1933), English footballer
- Bill Albury (born 1947), Australian Cricketer
- Charles Donald Albury (1920–2009), American co-pilot of the B-29 Bockscar when it dropped the atomic bomb on Nagasaki
- James Albury (born 1986), Australian baseball player
- James C. Albury, American astronomer and television personality
- Keianna Albury (born 1996), Bahamian sprinter
- Kenneth Albury (1920–1998), Bahamian Olympic sailor
- Louisa Lawson (1848–1920), née Albury, Australian poet
- Simon Albury (born 1982), Australian Paralymptic rower
- Terry J. Albury, former American FBI agent
- Vic Albury (1947–2017), American baseball player
