= Bill Albury =

Bill or William Albury may refer to:

- Bill Albury (footballer) (1933–2026), English footballer
- Bill Albury (cricketer) (born 1947), Australian cricketer
