= Fairlie Branch =

Overview
- Status: Partly Closed
- Owner: Railways Department
- Locale: Canterbury, New Zealand
- Termini: Washdyke; Eversley
- Stations: 15

Service
- Type: Heavy Rail
- System: New Zealand Government Railways (NZGR)
- Operator(s): Railways Department

History
- Opened: 1875–1884
- Closed: 2nd March 1968

Technical
- Line length: 58.2 km (36.2 mi)
- Number of tracks: Single
- Character: Rural
- Track gauge: 3 ft 6 in (1,067 mm)

Map

The Fairlie Branch (also known as the Eversley Branch) was a branch line railway in southern Canterbury which formed part of New Zealand's national railway network. Construction began in 1874, and at its farthest extent, it terminated just beyond Fairlie in Eversley. Its closure came in 1968, but a portion remains open in Pleasant Point as the Pleasant Point Museum and Railway.

== Construction ==
Proposed in the early 1870s, the local government voted in favour of a branch line from Timaru to Pleasant Point in December 1872 and a construction contract was let in the following March. After a railway act approving the line was passed later in 1873, construction could commence, and it did so on 18 February 1874. The branch left the Main South Line in Washdyke, now a northern suburb of Timaru, and headed northwest towards Pleasant Point. Construction of this 14.42 kilometres (8.96 mi) of railway proceeded without any notable difficulties, opening for service on 24 December 1875 - though trains had been able to run to Pleasant Point as early as two months previously. An extension followed swiftly, and the 27 kilometres (17 mi) addition to Albury opened on 1 January 1877.

After this point, however, construction stalled. On 13 August 1880, the Timaru Chamber of Commerce passed a resolution to pressure the government to call tenders for the construction of the remainder of the line. This was followed by a public meeting in Fairlie on 25 March 1882 that issued the same demand on the government, asserting that the line to Albury was the best paying in New Zealand and an extension would provide more convenient access to much of the freight then conveyed to the Albury terminus. Contracts were soon let, and the next 12 kilometres (7.5 mi) to Winscombe were opened on 24 August 1883. Less than half a year later, the final portion of the line was opened for general traffic to the locale of Eversley, just beyond Fairlie, on 28 January 1884, giving the branch a full length of 58.2 kilometres (36.2 mi). Some sources, including Railways Department publications, incorrectly state this happened on 9 January 1884. The opening of the line was celebrated on 30 January 1884 by a public holiday in Fairlie and environs, and an excursion train ran from Timaru conveying 600-700 passengers for the occasion. This train was double-headed by K 88 Washington and a member of the F class, and it consisted of a guard's van and 14 carriages, some of which were brought down from Christchurch the previous morning to cater for the anticipated large crowd.

There were plans to extend the branch even further to Burkes Pass and the Mackenzie Country. 27 kilometres (17 mi) of formation were made to varying standards of completion, but ultimately no rails were laid and the line's farthest terminus remained Eversley.

== Stations ==
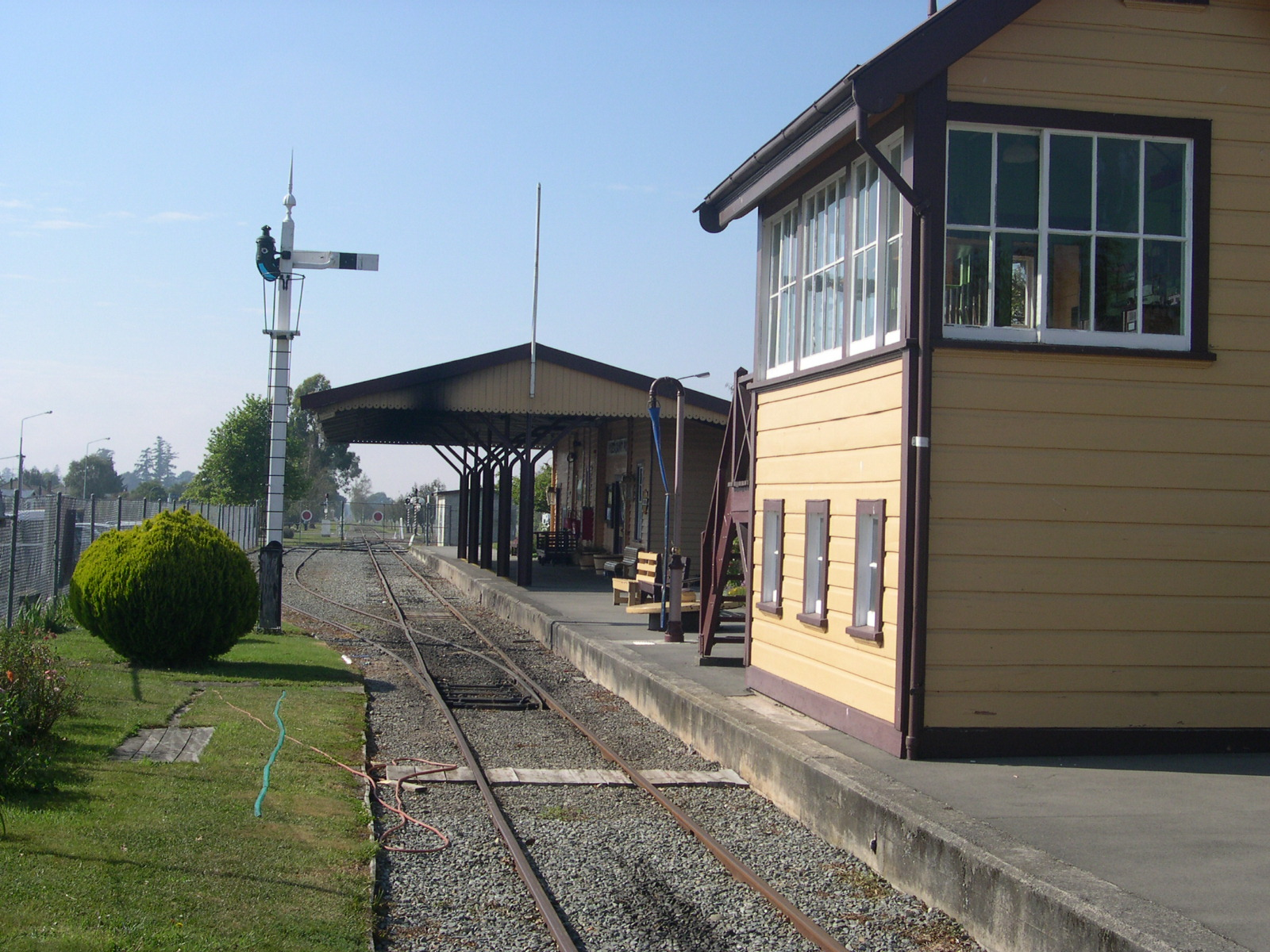
Pleasant Point Station

The following stations were located on the Fairlie Branch (in brackets is the distance from Washdyke):

- Racecourse (2 kilometres [1.2 mi])
- Cartwright's Road Crossing (2.632 kilometres [1.635 mi])
- Levels (5.91 kilometres [3.67 mi])
- Waitawa (approximately 10 kilometres [6.2 mi])
- Pleasant Point (14.42 kilometres [8.96 mi])
- Sutherlands (21.89 kilometres [13.60 mi])
- Cave (29.89 kilometres [18.57 mi])
- Ma Waro (35.38 kilometres [21.98 mi])
- Albury (41.18 kilometres [25.59 mi])
- Tengawai (approximately 42 kilometres [26 mi])
- Cricklewood (47.73 kilometres [29.66 mi])
- Winscombe (52.75 kilometres [32.78 mi])
- Fairlie (56.89 kilometres [35.35 mi]), known as Fairlie Creek until a name change was approved on 9 May 1892
- Eversley (58.2 kilometres [36.2 mi])

The Fairlie station was destroyed by fire on at least two occasions, first on 13 January 1890 and again on the night of 8 August 1908. After the 1908 fire, the post and telegraph office formerly based at Fairlie station was housed in a temporary building; this too was burnt down in a suspected act of arson on the morning of 20 September 1908.

== Operation ==
The line's reason for existence was to open up farmland in the region behind Timaru and promote rural development. When opened to Pleasant Point, two trains ran each way a day, and while the line had its terminus in Albury, significant traffic was generated by wool and grain being carried by dray to the station from regions further inland. Upon opening to Fairlie, the line's timetable was initially adjusted to the pattern typical of many rural New Zealand branch lines, with a single mixed train carrying both passengers and freight running each way per day. Special freight trains ran as necessary, especially to collect livestock from Pleasant Point. For a period, the line also had its own dedicated passenger train, nicknamed the "Fairlie Flyer", but it perhaps did not live up to its fast-sounding name; by the late 1920s, it was quicker to travel by car between Fairlie and Timaru, which resulted in a decline of traffic that led to the train's cancellation in 1930. From this time, passengers were solely catered for by the daily mixed train.

The line had also started making a loss around this period, and on 1 April 1934, the short section from Fairlie to Eversley was closed. It had always been operated as an extension of the Fairlie yard and its existence had become redundant. The rest of the line entered into a slow demise, with passenger services cut to thrice weekly in 1953; the mixed train operated Mondays, Wednesdays, and Fridays, with solely freight carried on Tuesdays and Thursdays. On 2 November 1953, passenger provisions were cancelled entirely and all services became freight only. With the cessation of the mixed trains, the small locomotive depot in Fairlie closed and the freight trains were operated every weekday morning from Timaru. Intense competition from road traffic posed problems for the line, and what traffic it did retain was mainly due to government subsidies. Despite this, by 1966, the livestock traffic that had been the line's primary cargo was all but non-existent and the decision was soon made to close the line. The date of closure was 2 March 1968 and the occasion was marked by a special return of the Fairlie Flyer, attracting large crowds of locals.

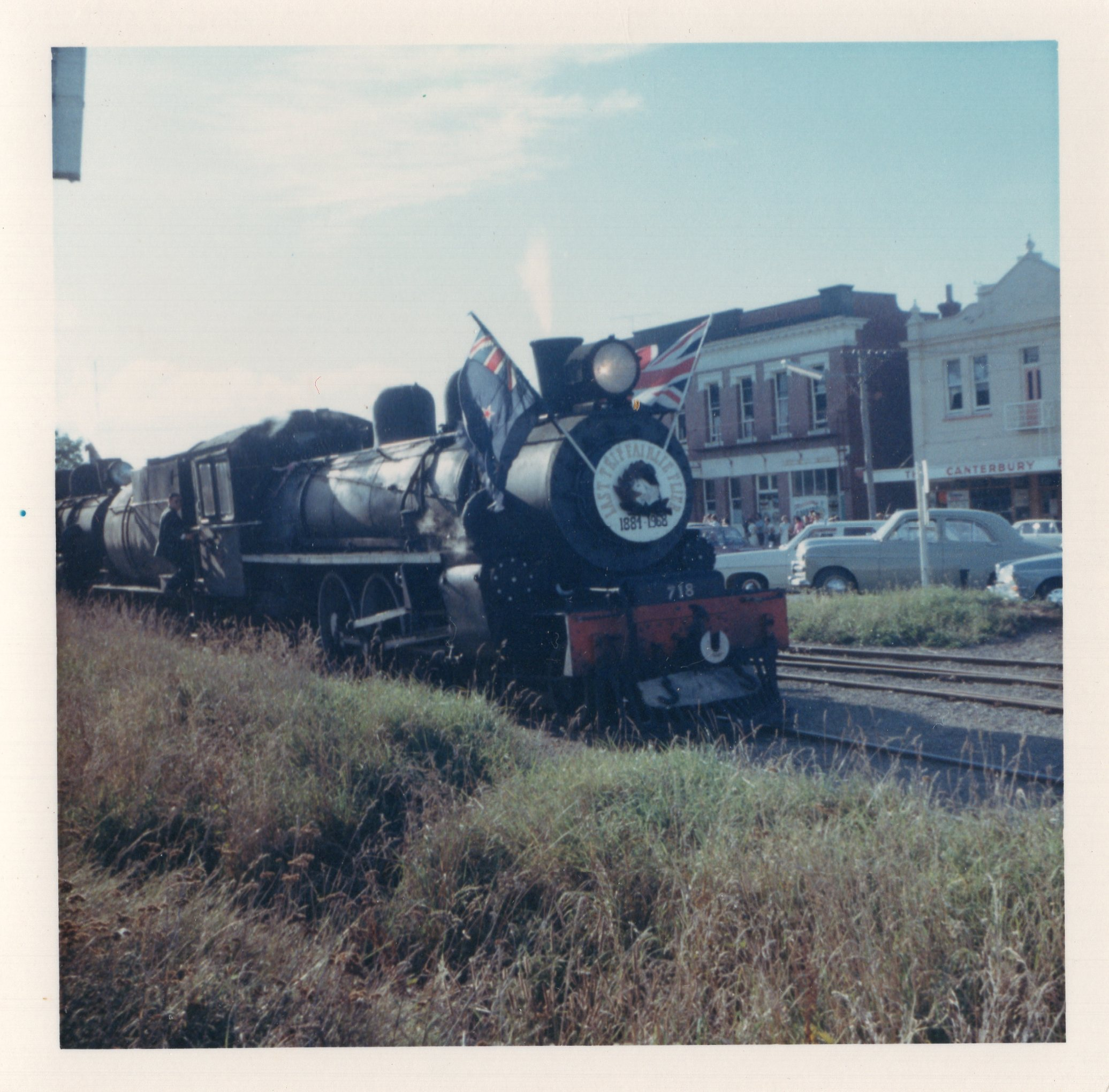
Train and main street of Pleasant Point, South Canterbury, March 1968

== The branch today ==
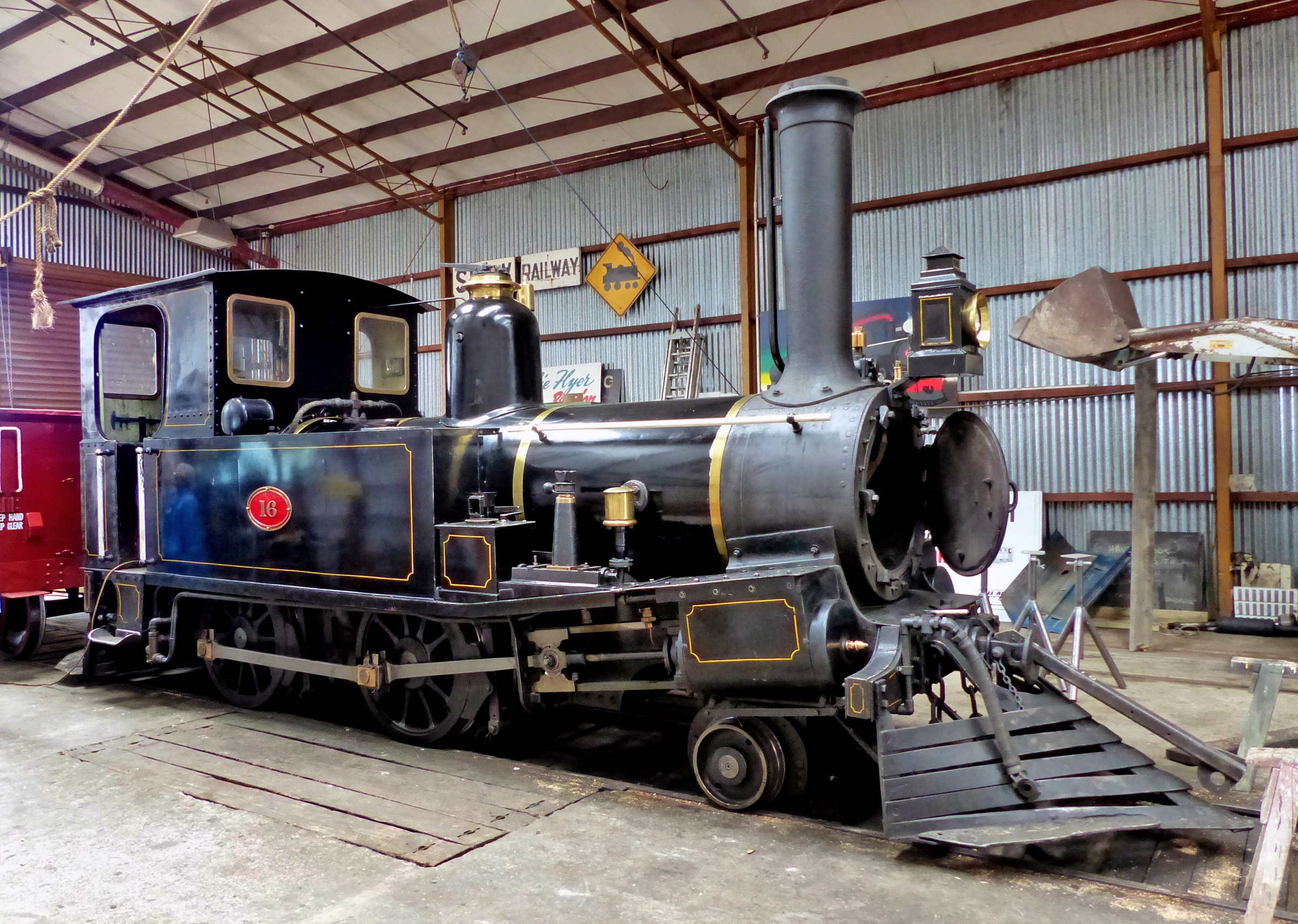
D 16 built in 1878 at the Pleasant Point Museum

Remnants of closed railway lines diminish and disappear as a result of natural and human activity, but some relics from the Fairlie Branch's operating days still exist, most notably the 2.5 kilometres (1.6 mi) of restored trackage still in use by the Pleasant Point Museum and Railway. At Washdyke, the first few hundred metres of the branch were retained as a backshunt and to provide access to an industrial siding, and the track currently remains in place. For much of the line's length from Timaru to Fairlie, the formation can be seen making its way through the rolling countryside, and abutments and piles still stand at the site of some bridges. One bridge itself still stands, near Winscombe. Loading banks still exist at the site of Levels, Waitawa, Sutherlands, and Cave stations. Levels also still possesses its goods shed and Waitawa has the remnants of a platform.

The Fairlie Rail Trail is planned to use the route once used by trains and to start work by 2015.

== Popular culture ==
The song "Fairlie Flyer" words by Bill Timmings and music by the Picasso Trio, written in the late 1960s, focuses on the branch line and some of its characters such as Martin Fahey, the legendary guard of the 'Fairlie Flyer' to Timaru. The refrain makes reference to the final excursion over the line, also dubbed the 'Fairlie Flyer' and hauled by A^{B}'s 718 and 798:

So fireman stoke that engine, steam down that railway track. This train that's leaving Fairlie is never, ever coming back.
