= Pleasant Point Museum and Railway =

Railway and museum in New Zealand

Pleasant Point Railway and Historical Society
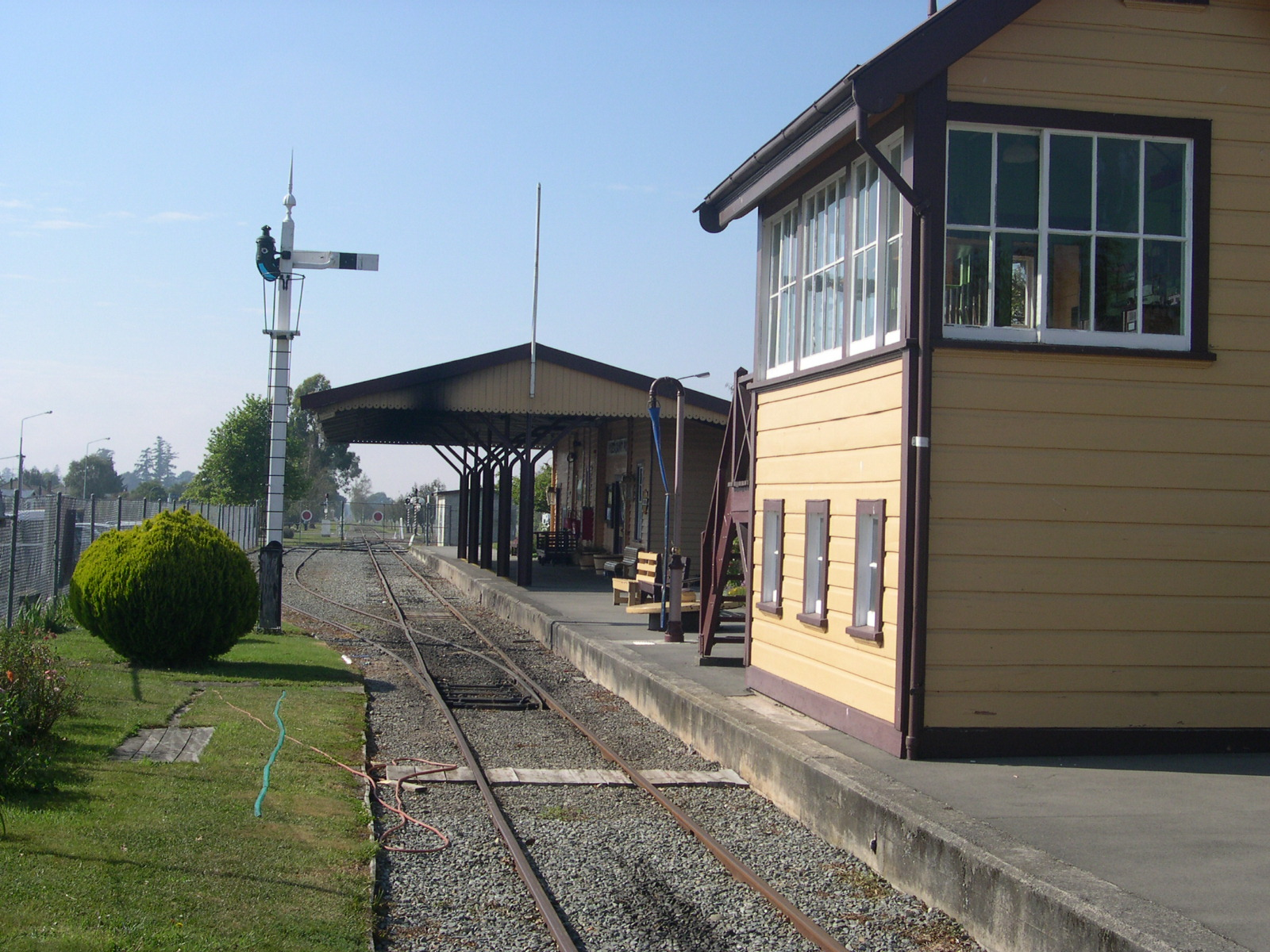
- Pleasant Point Railway Station 15 March 2005.
- Locale: Pleasant Point, Canterbury, New Zealand
- Terminus: Pleasant Point Station and Keane's Crossing Station
- Coordinates: 44.2612°S 171.1312°E

Commercial operations
- Name: Formerly part of the Fairlie Branch
- Built by: New Zealand Government Railways
- Original gauge: 1,067 mm (3 ft 6 in)

Preserved operations
- Operated by: Pleasant Point Railway and Historical Society
- Stations: Two
- Length: 2.5 km (1.6 mi)
- Preserved gauge: 1,067 mm (3 ft 6 in)

Commercial history
- Opened: 24 December 1875
- Closed: 2 March 1968
- 1970: First Operation of Trains

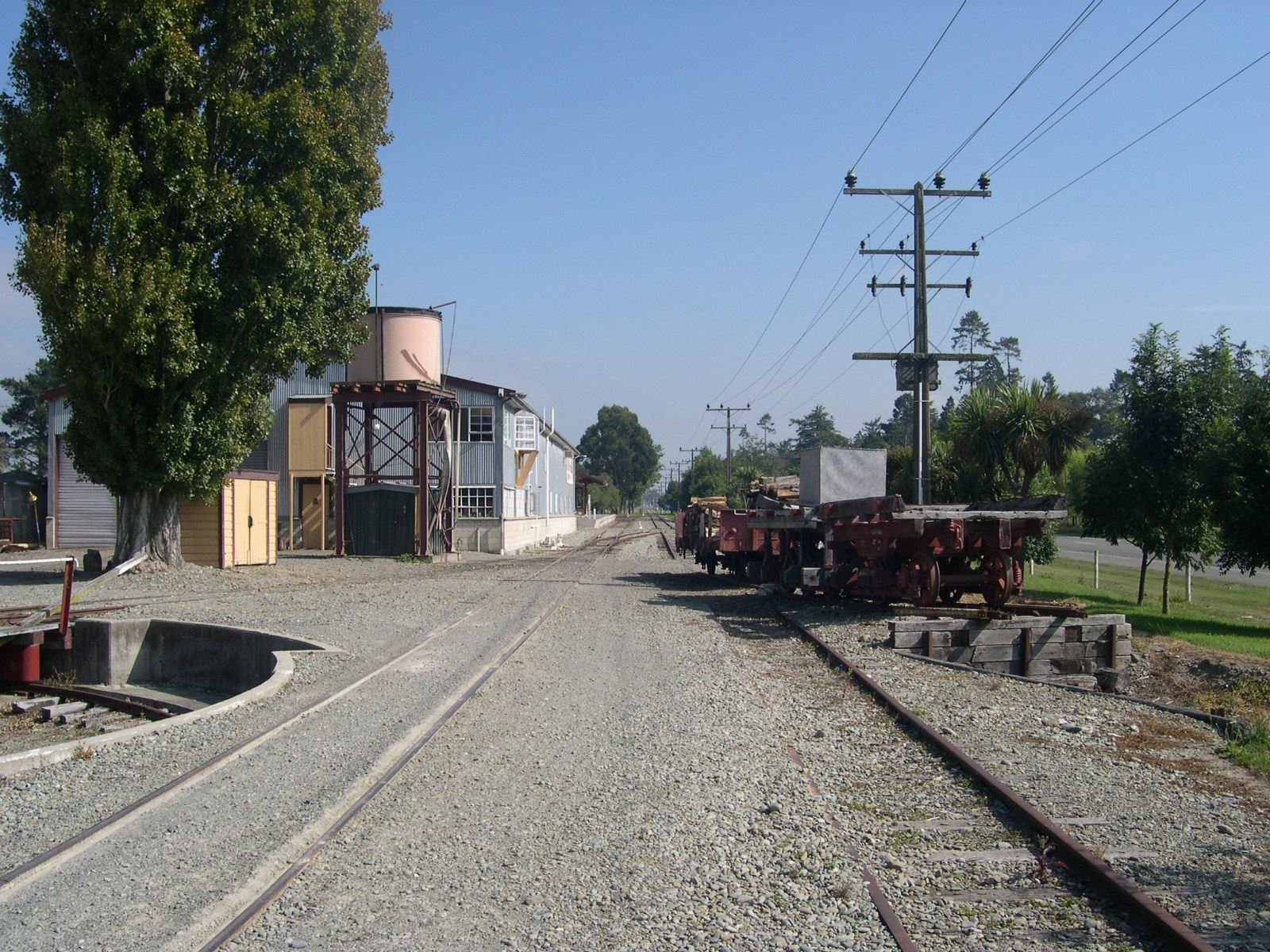
Pleasant Point Railway and Historical Society Yard

The Pleasant Point Railway and Historical Society is a heritage railway located in the small country town of Pleasant Point in southern Canterbury, New Zealand, inland from Timaru.

== History ==
Its main terminal is located at Pleasant Point Station, which was an important stop on the Fairlie branch railway. For just over a year from 24 December 1875, Pleasant Point was actually the terminus of the line as construction further inland proceeded, and upon completion of the line, it functioned as a typical country station until closure of the Fairlie Branch came on 2 March 1968. After the line closed, a historical society was formed with the aim of preserving Pleasant Point station, as the original building from 1875 still stood, with the addition of a 1930s booking office. The society ultimately managed to preserve the station, yard, and roughly 2.5 kilometres (1.6 mi) of track. The line runs between Pleasant Point station south-east to Keane's Crossing station.

== Motive Power ==
Motive power at the Pleasant Point Railway includes:

- A^{B} 699: a tender steam locomotive from 1922
- D 16: a tank locomotive from 1878
- T^{R} 18: a diesel shunter from 1936
- A PWD Ruston and Hornsby diesel shunter built in 1955.
- An RM class Model T Ford railcar replica build in 1926

The Model T Ford Railcar is a replica of an experimental railcar built in 1925 and scrapped in the 1930s. It is a significant rarity - one other replica of a Model T Ford Railcar exists in the United States, but it was built to different specifications. The unique nature of the railcar has enhanced the popularity of the Railway and it runs multiple trips on operating days. Trains run during the summer and at the other holiday periods. Rolling stock includes New Zealand's only "half birdcage" passenger carriage, which dates from 1895. The ex-NZR locomotives, A^{B} 699, D 16, and T^{R} 18 (TMS TR 62) are all regularly operated.

The Museum includes historical railway memorabilia and vintage computers, and the society also operates an Old Time Movie Theatre.

== See also ==
- Railway preservation in New Zealand
