= Raincliff =

- Rural area
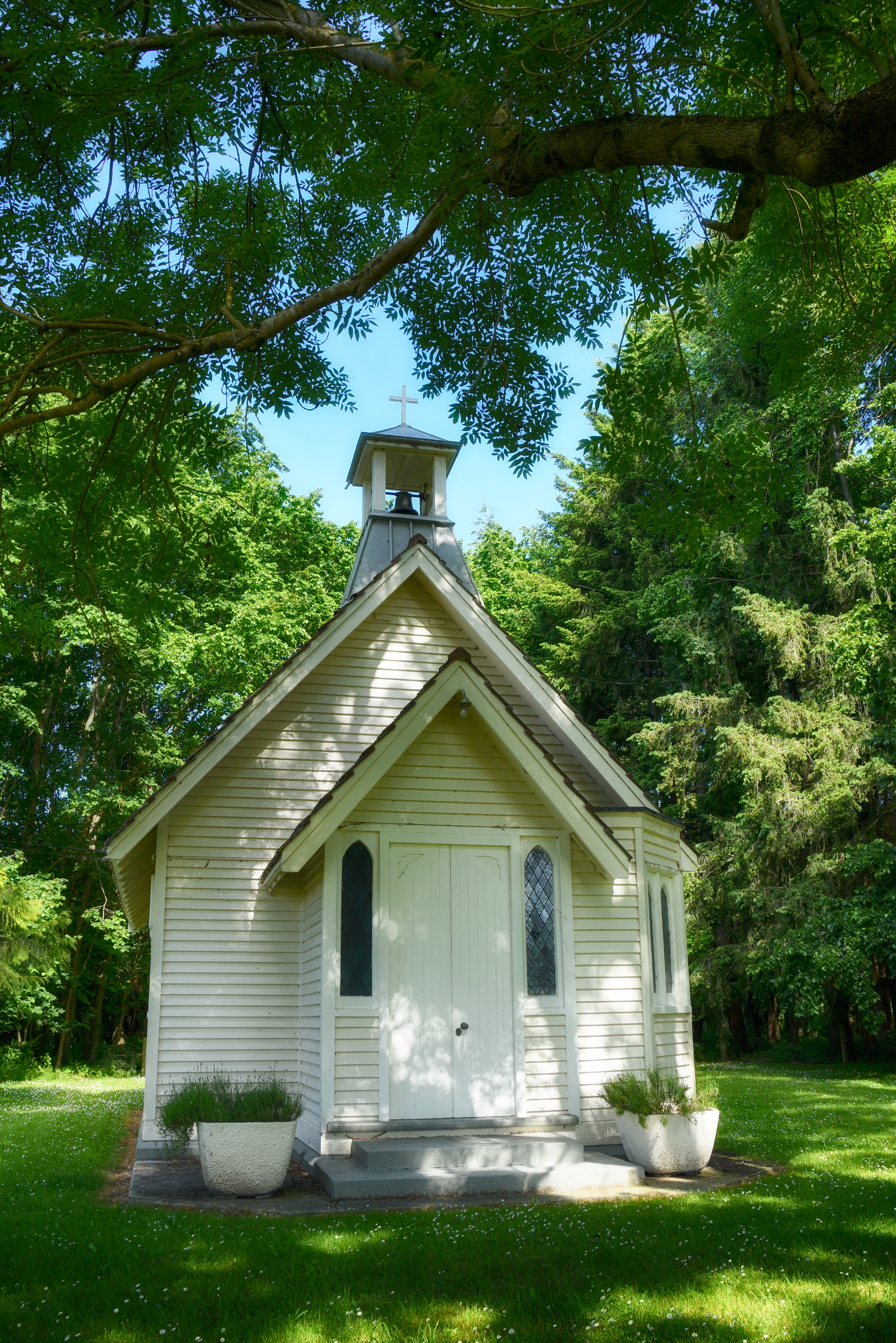
- St David's Church

- Location within New Zealand
- Coordinates: 44.165°S 170.982°E
- Country: New Zealand
- Region: Canterbury
- Territorial authority: Timaru District
- Elevation: 141 m (463 ft)
- Time zone: UTC+12 (NZST)
  - Summer (DST): UTC+13 (NZDT)
- Postcode: 7982
- Area code: 03
- Local iwi: Ngāi Tahu

Raincliff is a small rural community split across the Mackenzie and Timaru Districts, New Zealand. It is located north-west of Pleasant Point and east of Fairlie. The Ōpihi River and Opuha River runs through the area. Popular camping sites include Raincliff Scout Camp, Pioneer Park, and Raincliff Youth Camp.

Raincliff offers many recreational activities such as walks and hiking, mountain biking, rock climbing, kayaking, and fishing. Raincliff Scout Camp is a popular place where many scouts, schools, church groups, and many other groups stay and challenge themselves. The camp also has an obstacle course and flying fox. Raincliff Forest has many mountain biking tracks. Pioneer Park has walking and hiking tracks in native bush and forest.

St David's Church in Raincliff was built in 1907. The Anglican church is registered by Heritage New Zealand as a Category II heritage item.
