= NZR RM class (Model T Ford) =

NZR RM class Model T Ford
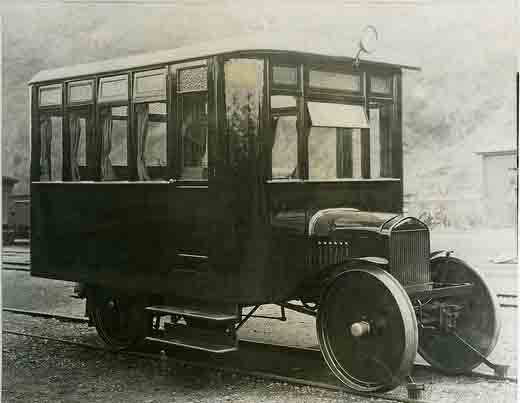
- Model T ford in 1926
- In service: 1926-1931
- Manufacturer: New Zealand Railways
- Built at: Hutt Workshops
- Constructed: 1925-1926
- Entered service: May 1926
- Scrapped: Dumped 1931
- Number built: 2 (Note: 2 originally built 1 replica built)
- Number in service: None
- Number preserved: 1 body extant 1 replica
- Number scrapped: 2
- Fleet numbers: RM 4 & 5
- Capacity: 11 passengers plus driver
- Operator: New Zealand Railways
- Lines served: All New Zealand main and branch lines

Specifications
- Maximum speed: 30 mph (48 km/h)
- Weight: two and a half long tons (2.80 short tons; 2.54 t)
- Track gauge: 3 ft 6 in (1,067 mm)

The NZR RM class Model T Ford railcar is a type of rail motor that operated on New Zealand's national rail network. Only two were built, classified as RM 4 and RM 5, and they were experimental railcars designed in an attempt to offer improved passenger services on quiet country branch lines that served regions with small populations.

== Technical details ==
The engine and transmission used for Ford Model T cars served as the basis of these railcars, which came to resemble a red box on wheels. The passenger compartment was a mere eleven ft (3.35 m) long and seven ft (2.13 m) wide and seated eleven plus the driver. At the front of the railcar, a small front hood extended out from the boxy compartment and housed the engine, and from the bonnet hung large pannier bags for luggage. The railcar weighed two and a half long tons (2.80 short tons; 2.54 t), ran on four wheels, and could reach speeds of up to 30 mph (48 km/h), a speed that was relatively fast for country branch lines of the time. It was designed so that one person could operate it rather than three that were required for a conventional carriage train.

== Operation ==
=== Greytown Branch ===
After being built in 1925–26 at the Hutt Workshops in Petone, the railcars were sent to the Greytown Branch in the Wairarapa for trials. The Greytown Branch was a short line that provided a link between the town of Greytown and the Wairarapa Line, which bypassed the town by some four kilometres. Services ran from Greytown to connect with services on the Wairarapa Line at the junction in Woodside, but they were woefully underpatronised; often, the steam locomotive working the service would pull just a guard's van and a single passenger carriage carrying a handful of passengers. The costs to operate such a service meant that the line made a significant financial loss, but it was hoped that the small Model T Ford railcars would slash operating costs while providing a satisfactory service for the travellers who did use the line. Unfortunately, they did not prove as successful or as popular as hoped, so, after their trial period, steam-hauled carriage trains were reinstated for all services and the railcars were sent to work in Southland.

=== Southland branches ===
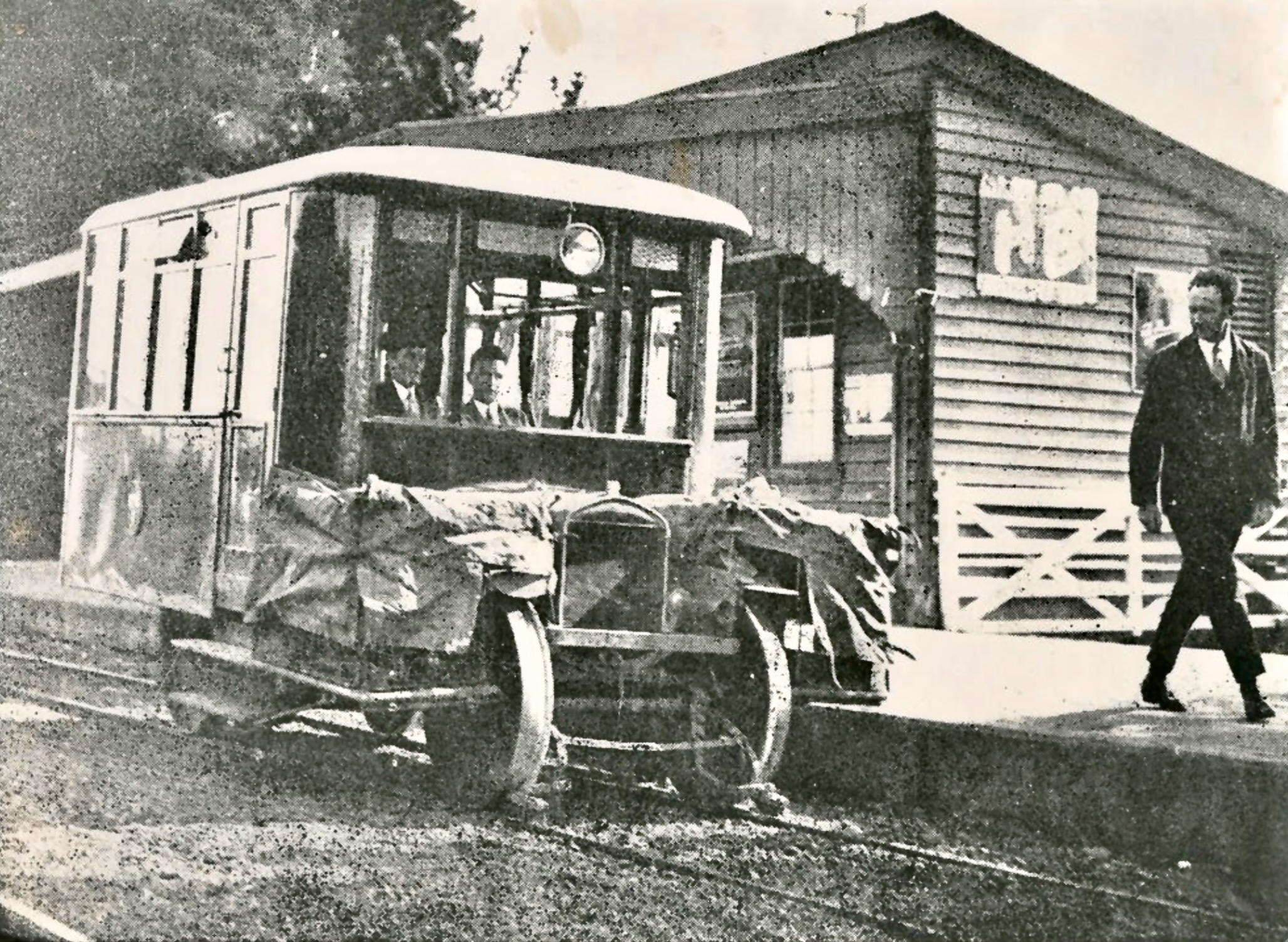
Railcar with mailbags at Wyndham

In Southland, the Model T Ford railcars were assigned to the Waikaia and the Wyndham (Glenham) branches and began operating in late May 1926. These two lines were similar in some ways to the Greytown Branch; although they did not have multiple shuttle services to connect with mainline trains, they served small towns with insufficient demand for locomotive-hauled carriage passenger trains. Previously, the two lines had been served by mixed trains that carried both passengers and freight, and as they had to load and unload freight along the way, trip times were slow and thus unpopular. It was hoped the Model T Ford railcars would rejuvenate traffic and provide some measure of profitability, especially on the section of the Wyndham Branch from Wyndham to Glenham, which was so underutilised that it was facing closure.

The Model T Ford railcars worked on the two branch lines for the latter half of the 1920s, but not to any notable degree of success. This was in part due to their wheel arrangement; bogies give a more comfortable ride than the two separate axles used by these particular railcars. The railcars were also prone to overheating as the luggage bags hung from the bonnet blocked the motor's ventilation, and this led some members of the public to nickname the railcars "tea pots" or "coffee pots". Other nicknames were "glasshouses" and "pie carts". On the Waikaia Branch, the Model T Ford railcars were unpopular with the local residents and were neither successful themselves nor able to generate enough traffic to warrant replacement with a more popular carriage service. On the Wyndham Branch, they failed to achieve the desired success as well, and were unable to keep the section from Wyndham to Glenham open. The line to Glenham was closed on 14 July 1930, and the railcars were removed from service the next year. Their retirement meant that the numbers RM 4 and RM 5 were free to be re-used later – in 1936 they were allocated to the first two Wairarapa railcars, the second truly successful railcar type in New Zealand (after the Midland class).

== Preservation ==
A replica was built by the Pleasant Point Museum and Railway and is a popular attraction. Its popularity is enhanced by the fact that while Model T Ford railcars and railbuses of various types were built around the world, it is one of only two replicas in the world. During summer and other holiday seasons, it runs services from Pleasant Point station multiple times daily. The railcar was given the number RM 4 by the Railway and was built between 1981 and 1999 by volunteers.

Recently, the body of Model T Ford railcar, RM 5 (not to be confused with Wairarapa railcar, RM 5) was discovered on a property in Southland. In 2018 it was gifted to the Pleasant Point Museum and Railway and was moved there soon after. There are currently no plans associated with RM 5. The final resting place for RM 4 is unknown.
