= HMS Albury =

Royal Navy minesweeper

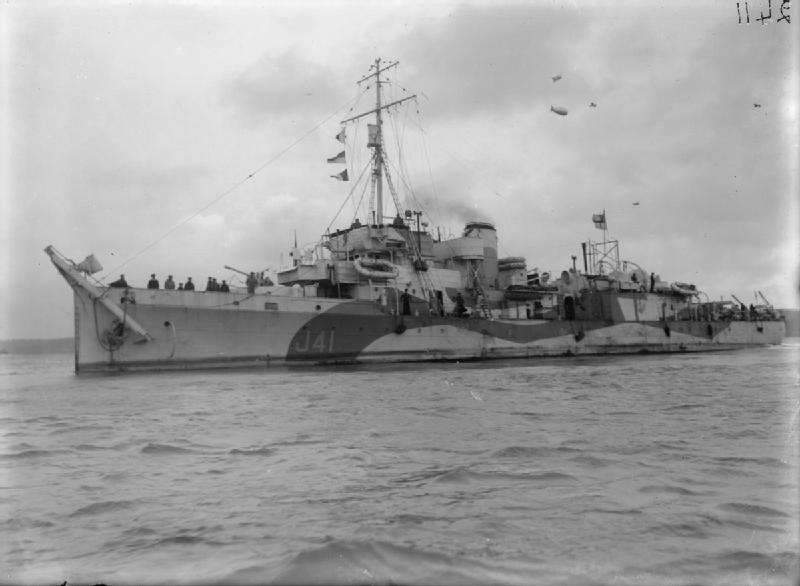
- Albury in December 1942

History

United Kingdom
- Builder: Ailsa Shipbuilding Company, Troon
- Launched: 21 November 1918
- Commissioned: 17 February 1919
- Identification: Pennant number: J41
- Fate: Sold 13 March 1947 for scrap Dohmen & Habets, Liège

General characteristics
- Class & type: Hunt-class minesweeper, Aberdare sub-class
- Displacement: 800 long tons (813 t)
- Length: 213 ft (65 m) o/a
- Beam: 28 ft 6 in (8.69 m)
- Draught: 7 ft 6 in (2.29 m)
- Installed power: 2 × Yarrow boilers; 2,200 ihp (1,600 kW)
- Propulsion: 2 shafts; 2 vertical triple-expansion steam engines
- Speed: 16 knots (30 km/h; 18 mph)
- Range: 1,500 nmi (2,800 km; 1,700 mi) at 15 knots (28 km/h; 17 mph)
- Complement: 74
- Armament: 1 × QF 4-inch (102 mm) gun; 1 × 76 mm (3.0 in) anti-aircraft gun

HMS Albury was a Hunt-class minesweeper of the Aberdare sub-class built for the Royal Navy during World War I. She was not finished in time to participate in the First World War and survived the Second World War to be sold for scrap in 1947.

== Design and description ==
The Aberdare sub-class were enlarged versions of the original Hunt-class ships with a more powerful armament. The ships displaced 800 long tons (810 t) at normal load. They measured 231 feet (70.4 m) long overall with a beam of 26 feet 6 inches (8.1 m). They had a draught of 7 feet 6 inches (2.3 m). The ships' complement consisted of 74 officers and ratings.

The ships had two vertical triple-expansion steam engines, each driving one shaft, using steam provided by two Yarrow boilers. The engines produced a total of 2,200 indicated horsepower (1,600 kW) and gave a maximum speed of 16 knots (30 km/h; 18 mph). They carried a maximum of 185 long tons (188 t) of coal which gave them a range of 1,500 nautical miles (2,800 km; 1,700 mi) at 15 knots (28 km/h; 17 mph).

The Aberdare sub-class was armed with a quick-firing (QF) four-inch (102 mm) gun forward of the bridge and a QF twelve-pounder (76.2 mm) anti-aircraft gun aft. Some ships were fitted with six- or three-pounder guns in lieu of the twelve-pounder. Albury was fitted with a single six-pounder gun in 1931, but by 1939 was listed as having an armament of 1 × 4 inch and 1 × 12-pounder gun.

== Construction and career ==
HMS Albury was built by the Ailsa Shipbuilding Company at their shipyard in Troon, Ayrshire. She was launched on 21 November 1918, and commissioned on 17 February 1919. On 21 November 1919, Albury was laid up in reserve at the Nore.

Albury served in the 1st Minesweeping Flotilla in Home waters from 1927 to 1935. In 1939 Albury was in reserve at Malta, part of the 3rd Minesweeper Flotilla. On 3 March 1940, Albury was one of five minesweepers ordered back to British waters from the Mediterranean, joining the 5th Minesweeping Flotilla at Harwich on 2 April 1940. She took part in the Dunkirk evacuation, Operation Dynamo, from 28 May–4 June 1940, carrying out six evacuation trips and landing 1851 evacuees back in Britain. By June 1941, Albury was part of the 4th Minesweeping Flotilla. On 7 November that year, she was attacked by German bombers off the East coast of Scotland. She was near missed by German bombs, which caused minor machinery damage, which took five weeks to repair.

On 19 January 1942 Albury was involved in a collision with HMS Sutton, another Hunt-class minesweeper, and took serious damage.

== D-Day and the invasion of Normandy ==
On 6 June 1944, Albury, still part of the 4th Minesweeping Flotilla, took part in Operation Overlord, the Allied invasion of Normandy.

The 4th Flotilla Group was tasked with sweeping the path ahead of D-Day and in support of the US forces landing at Omaha and Utah beaches. The ship was the first to return to England laden with the dead and wounded from the landings.

From January 1945, Albury was laid up as part of the Reserve Fleet at Falmouth, and on 13 March 1947 was sold to Dohman & Habets of Liège, Belgium for mercantile conversion.

== Pennant numbers ==
Pennant number	Date
T9/	January 1919
G64	November 1919
N41	1939
J41	1940

== See also ==
- Albury is the name of a number of places in England
