= Beckenham Place Park =

Park in London Borough of Lewisham, England

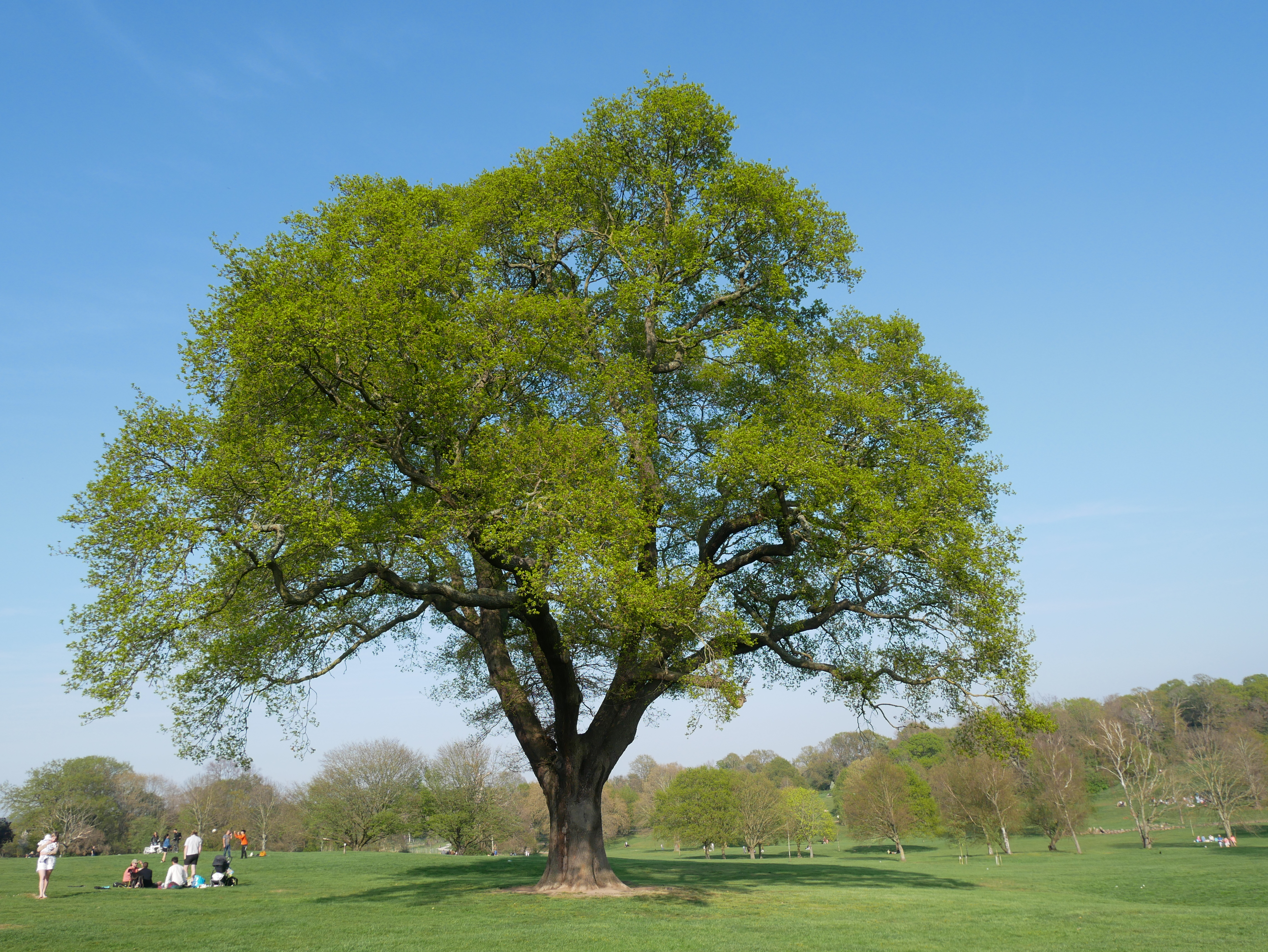
- Beckenham Place Park is the largest green space in Lewisham
- Interactive map of Beckenham Place Park
- Type: public park
- Location: London, England
- Coordinates: 51°25′06″N 0°01′07″W
- Area: 96 hectares (237 acres)
- Created: 1927 (golf course 1907-1929-2016)
- Operator: London Borough of Lewisham
- Status: Open year round
- Website: lewisham.gov.uk/inmyarea/openspaces/parks/beckenham-place-park

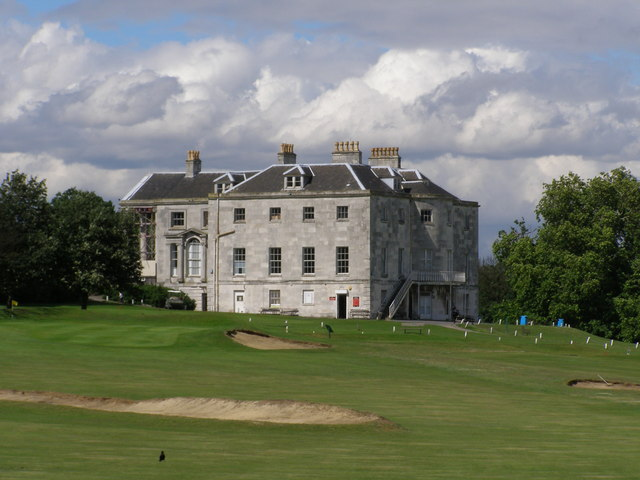
The mansion now houses a community centre and cafe. Photo: IM Chengappa, geograph.org.uk

Beckenham Place Park is a large park located near Beckenham in the London Borough of Lewisham. It lies close to the border with the London Borough of Bromley, and was formerly divided between the two boroughs. The Palladian-style mansion that gave the park its name now serves as a community centre and café.

== History of the park ==
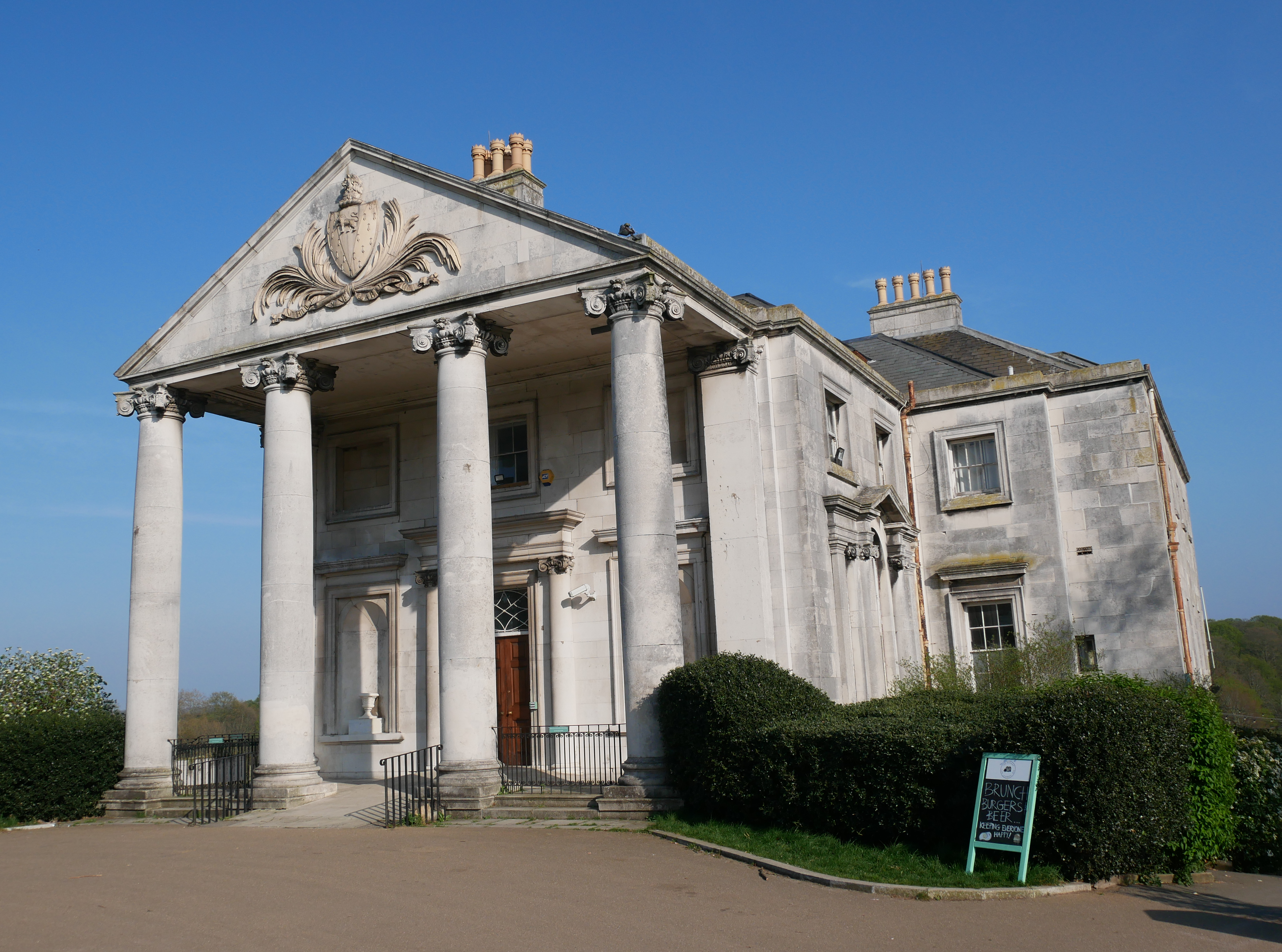
Beckenham Place Mansion

Although so named because John Cator the younger established the park between 1757/60 and 1785 and acquired the rights of the Manor of Beckenham, it transpires that most of the land in the current park was in the neighbouring Manor of Foxgrove and some nearby Lewisham Lands that once belonged to the Forsters of Southend, Lewisham and the Earl of Rockingham/Sondes/Lees Court estate. Several accounts of the history of the park require amendment due to recent rediscoveries from different archives. The Friends of Beckenham Place Park endeavour to compile an accurate history based on archive material in the British Library, Kent, Essex and Surrey Archives. Bromley and Lewisham Local Studies Libraries.

Beckenham Manor has medieval origins and is mentioned in the Domesday Book as belonging to the Bishop of Bayeux. In the 17th century, the whole estate was owned by Walter St John, and later by Frederick Viscount Bolingbroke, who sold the estate with manorial rights passing to the noted Quaker and MP John Cator in 1773. Records show John Cator acquired land here as early as 1757 and built his house by 1762 on part of the neighbouring Foxgrove Manor. The ownership of Foxgrove Manor was under Sir Francis Leigh of Hawley until 1712, then passed through the Tolson, Tilly, Bridges, Groves, and Timewell families as divided lands. Then via the Raymonds and Burrells it came fully into the possession of John Cator (d. 1806). Cator built the mansion that stands today.

Cator's father-in-law, botanist Peter Collinson, visited in September 1762, commenting:

... went, for the first time, to visit my son-in-law John Cator [sic] (who married my daughter), at his new-built house, now finished, at Stump's Hill, half-way (on the south side of the road) between Southend and Beckenham, in Kent, began in the spring 1760, on a pretty wooded estate that he had purchased. The plantations about it, all of his own doing, I found in a thriving condition, and when grown up will adorn so stately a house, in so delectable a situation, and make it a Paradise.

Cator, reputed to be friends with Swedish botanist Carl Linnaeus, introduced many exotic tree species and a lake. The lake stood dry for a time but has now been re-established to provide a wild swimming space and wetlands for birds. Even today, there are reputed to be 60 species of tree on the estate. The association is unlikely but Cator's father in law, Peter Collinson, had met Linnaeus in 1735/36 and continued a lifelong correspondence with him exchanging plant specimens and philosophical discussions.

Collinson writes about Cator and his own son that they both pester him for plants from his own garden at Mill Hill and requests Rhodedendrons, Kalmias and Azaleas from his friend John Barham in America.

The mansion remained with the Cator family until the 20th century, although inhabited by tenants for most of the 19th century – including a boys school and sanitorium in the early 20th century – before being bought by London County Council in 1927. In 1929 the golf course (established in 1907) became the first municipally owned course in England (and also reputedly the busiest), while the mansion was retained as a clubhouse. During the Second World War, the park became a prisoner of war camp and defensive measures including anti-aircraft battery and barrage balloons were installed.

The park was managed by the Greater London Council from 1965, then by Lewisham borough council from 1972. In 1995 after boundary changes the park is entirely within the Borough of Lewisham – formerly falling within two boroughs according to boundary markers which can still be seen in Summerhouse Hill Wood.

== Layout and notable features ==
Beckenham Place Park is Lewisham's largest green space, extending to 96 hectares (237 acres), and including a wide range of facilities, including a sensory garden.

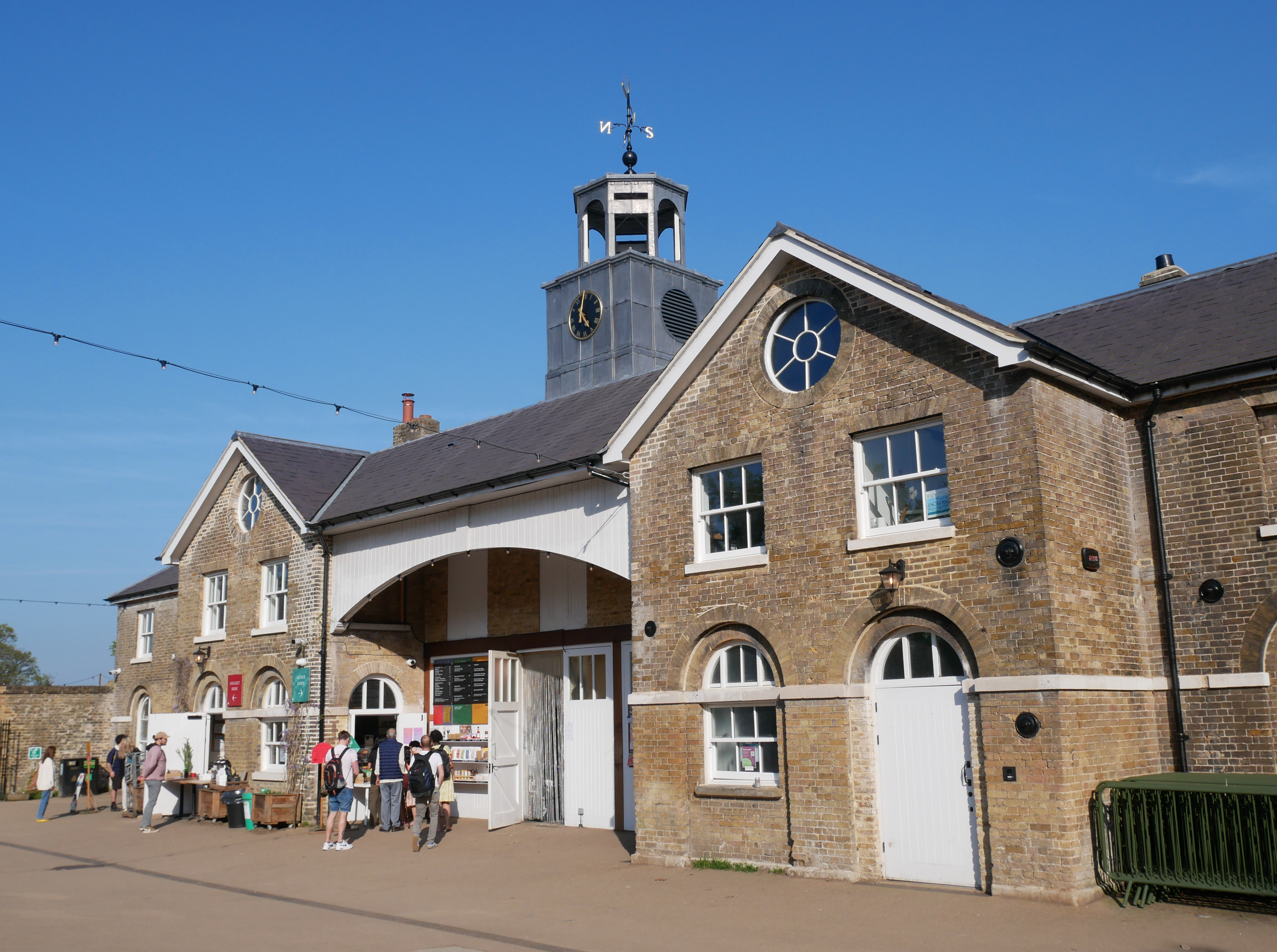
The stable block in Beckenham Place Park

A railway bisects the park and the only routes joining both parts are the bridge north of woodland called the Ash Plantation or by leaving and re-entering the park in the vicinity of Ravensbourne railway station. Hence, the railway effectively divides the park into west and east sides.

Beckenham Place Park contains ancient woodland as well as other habitats. Notable trees include oak, wild service tree, sweet chestnut and an ancient Turkey oak tree (reputedly the second oldest in Britain), that survived an arson attack in the 1990s but succumbed to wind, old age and vandalism in 2002. There is also an old mulberry tree.

The park underwent a £6.8 million regeneration in 2019, which saw the closure of the public golf course, and opening of a wild swimming lake, and BMX track. In July 2019, a child almost drowned in the lake. In April 2025, a child drowned in the lake.

It is a Local Nature Reserve and a Site of Metropolitan Importance for Nature Conservation It is also part of the Green Chain Walk and Capital Ring.

== See also ==
- Beckenham
