= Perceval House =

English football club

Coordinates: 51.47080°N 0.00842°W

Perceval House is a building in Blackheath, London which gave its name to a military training school; in October 1863, the school's football team became a founder-member of The Football Association, the body which regulates football in England.

The school's representative on the inaugural meeting of the Football Association was G.W. Shillingford. He, along with his colleagues from the other Blackheath-based teams at the meeting, favoured a form of football allowing "hacking" and handling of the ball, similar to rugby; when this was rejected by the majority of the teams as they attempted to formulate one agreed set of rules, no-one from Perceval House was represented at the fifth meeting of the F.A. in December 1863 and nothing further was heard from them.

== Building ==
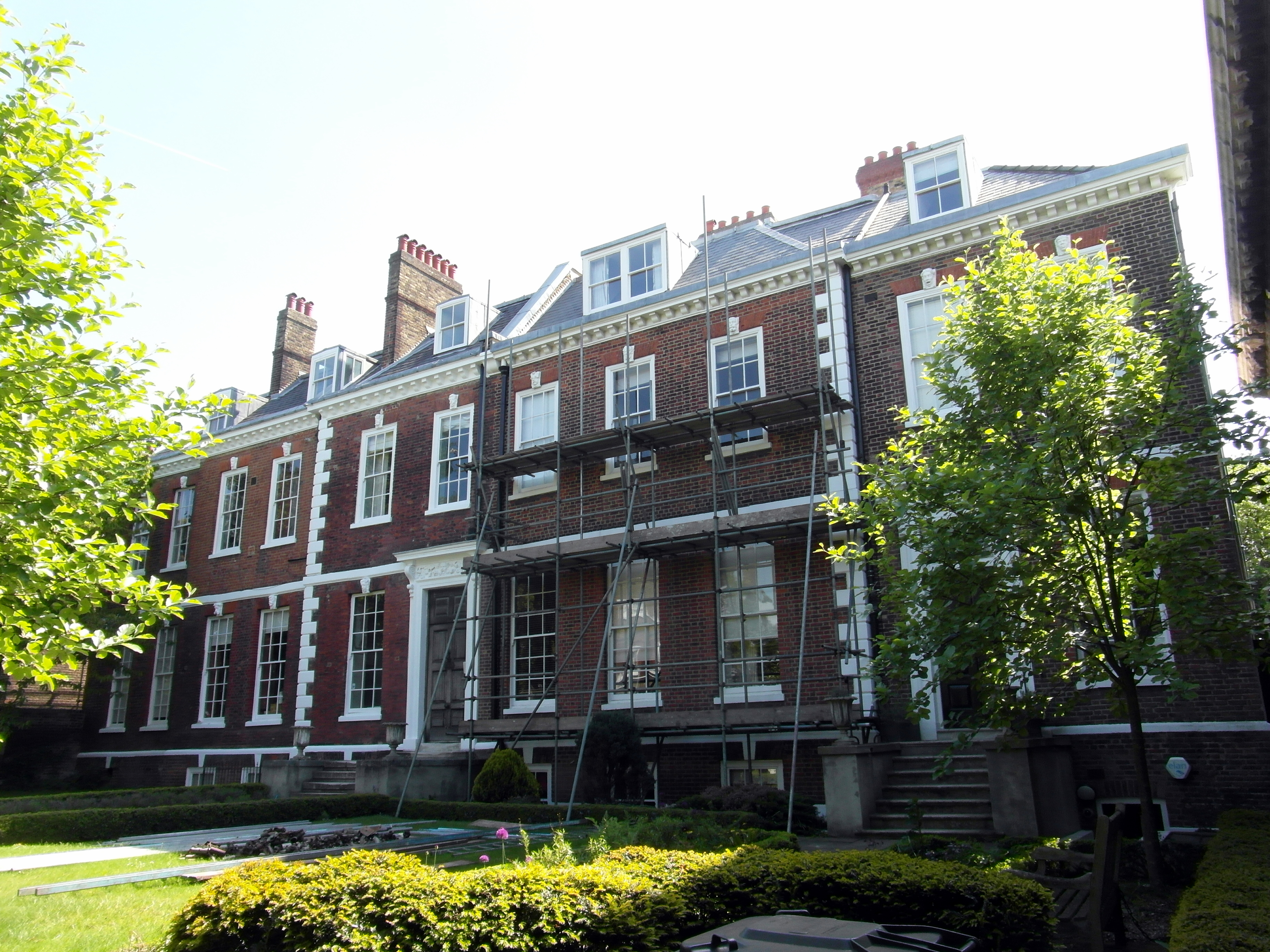
Spencer House and Perceval House, Blackheath

The school was situated in a former noble residence in Dartmouth Row, Blackheath, adjacent to Dartmouth Chapel (later replaced by the Church of the Ascension). The building housed a girls school, run by a Miss Sapienta Stone, from 1835 to 1850, and, at the time of the FA's foundation, housed a military training school (1860–1885) run by William Keizer, captain of Blackheath Golf Club.

Built in the 1680s as a private residence for George Legge, 1st Baron Dartmouth, it was later renamed Spencer Perceval House (Spencer Perceval's half nephew John Viscount Perceval occupied the house from 1814 to 1822). The building was divided in two in 1890. Both Spencer House and Perceval House survive and are Grade II* listed buildings. It was described by Pevsner:

"... the finest houses of all are further round the heath, in Dartmouth Row. Spencer Perceval House was built towards the end of the 17th Century. The keystone faces, with classical masks are particularly fine. It is an unusually interesting Carolean building."
