= Boone's Chapel =

Grade I listed chapel in the London Borough of Lewisham

Coordinates: 51.4587°N 0.0029°E

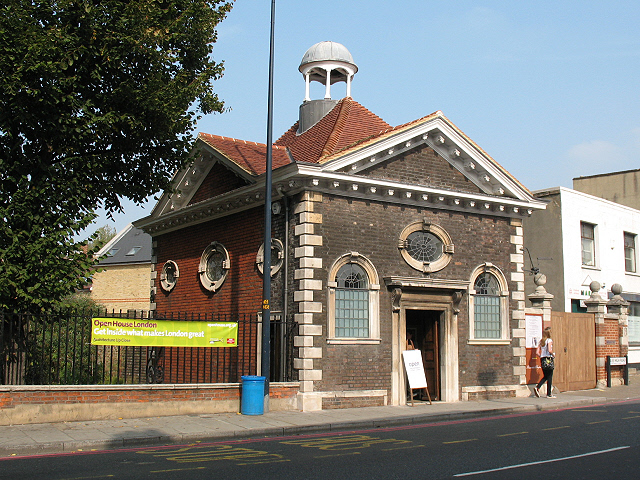
Boone's Chapel, Lee, London

Boone's Chapel is a single-storey building attributed to Sir Christopher Wren and built in 1683. The chapel is very small, measuring just 45 square metres and is constructed of red brickwork with Portland stone details to window architraves, rusticated quoins and a pyramidal roof with an open wood cupola. The chapel is listed Grade I on the National Heritage List for England.

It is located adjacent to the Worshipful Company of Merchant Taylors almshouses on Lee High Road in Lewisham, London and is one of only two Grade I-listed buildings in the borough of Lewisham (the other is St Paul's, Deptford).

== History ==
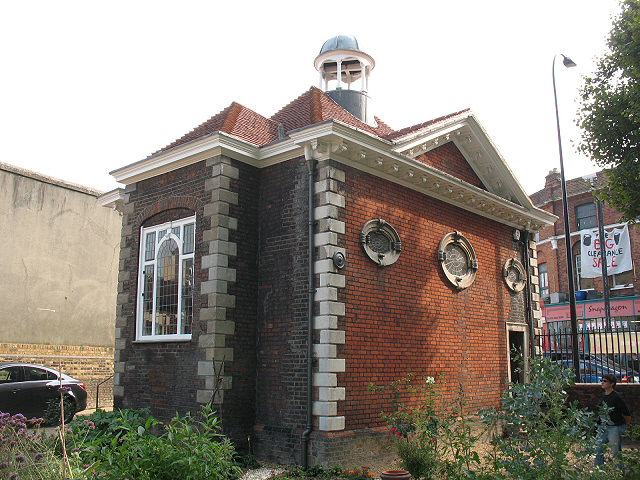
Rear of Boone's Chapel

Christopher Boone, a member of the Merchant Taylors’ Company, commissioned Sir Christopher Wren to design the chapel. The Boone family lived in Herefordshire and income from their estate was used to build almshouses for the elderly of Lee and also to educate twelve poor children.

Though Wren may have been commissioned to build both the chapel and almshouses, it appears that Robert Hooke, a friend and colleague and another member of the Merchant Taylors’ Company, actually undertook construction.

Although the almshouses that were built to the left of the chapel along Lee High Road were demolished in 1877, the chapel itself was preserved as a reading room. There are remaining Grade II-listed almhouses dating from 1825 just up from the chapel. Following the end of the second world war, the chapel fell into disuse.

=== Mausoleum ===
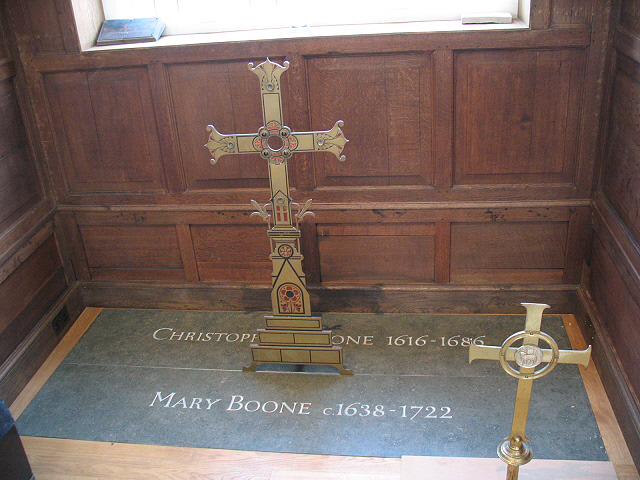
Grave of Christopher and Mary Boone, Boone's Chapel, London

Both Christopher Boone (1616-1686) and his wife, Mary (c1638-1722) are interred within the chapel.

== Restoration ==
By the late 1990s, the Grade I-listed chapel was suffering from decades of neglect and was placed on English Heritage's London Buildings at Risk register. To combat this, a new charity was set up - The Blackheath Historic Buildings Trust - in 1999.

The charity received Heritage Lottery Funding and support from the London Borough of Lewisham, livery companies and the support of local residents through the Lee Manor and Blackheath Societies. The funding allowed for the chapel to be completely renovated.

Following the raising of over £500,000, Boone's Chapel was renovated in 2008. A small physic garden was also added during the renovation.

The chapel is now used by a firm of architects but is open to the public 30 days a year.
