= Albury, New Zealand =

Albury
- Village
- Interactive map of Albury
- Coordinates: 44°13′50″S 170°52′26″E
- Country: New Zealand
- Region: Canterbury
- Territorial authority: Mackenzie District
- Ward: Opuha Ward
- Community: Fairlie Community
- Electorates: Waitaki; Te Tai Tonga (Māori)

Government
  - Territorial authority: Mackenzie District Council
  - Regional council: Environment Canterbury
  - Mayor of Mackenzie: Scott Aronsen
  - Waitaki MP: Miles Anderson
  - Te Tai Tonga MP: Mananui Ramsden

Area
  - Total: 6.39 km^{2} (2.47 sq mi)

Population (2023 census)
  - Total: 90
  - Density: 14/km^{2} (36/sq mi)
- Local iwi: Ngāi Tahu
- Website: Mackenzie District Council

Albury is a small village in the southern part of the Canterbury region of the South Island of New Zealand. It is inland from Timaru and located on State Highway 8 between Pleasant Point and Fairlie. It is in the Mackenzie Country (Mackenzie District).

== History ==
Albury is located in a rural farming district, and for over six years in the 19th century served as the temporary terminus of the branch railway line that would become the Fairlie Branch. The line was opened on 1 January 1877 and an extension beyond the town to Winscombe opened on 24 August 1883. Although the Fairlie Branch closed on 2 March 1968, some formation from the line can still be seen around Albury. Albury is thought to have been named by the Kennaway brothers. Albury lost its post office when 580 others closed, on 5 February 1988.

== Demographics ==
Albury locality covers 6.39 km^{2} (2.47 sq mi). It is part of the Opua statistical area.

Historical population
Year	Pop.	±% p.a.
2006	81	—
2013	69	−2.26%
2018	78	+2.48%
2023	90	+2.90%

Albury had a population of 90 in the 2023 New Zealand census, an increase of 12 people (15.4%) since the 2018 census, and an increase of 21 people (30.4%) since the 2013 census. There were 51 males and 39 females in 33 dwellings. The median age was 42.8 years (compared with 38.1 years nationally). There were 15 people (16.7%) aged under 15 years, 15 (16.7%) aged 15 to 29, 51 (56.7%) aged 30 to 64, and 9 (10.0%) aged 65 or older.

People could identify as more than one ethnicity. The results were 93.3% European (Pākehā), 20.0% Māori, and 6.7% other, which includes people giving their ethnicity as "New Zealander". English was spoken by 100.0%. No language could be spoken by 3.3% (e.g. too young to talk). New Zealand Sign Language was known by 3.3%. The percentage of people born overseas was 10.0, compared with 28.8% nationally.

The sole religious affiliation given was 23.3% Christian. People who answered that they had no religion were 66.7%, and 6.7% of people did not answer the census question.

Of those at least 15 years old, 9 (12.0%) people had a bachelor's or higher degree, 45 (60.0%) had a post-high school certificate or diploma, and 24 (32.0%) people exclusively held high school qualifications. The median income was $27,400, compared with $41,500 nationally. 6 people (8.0%) earned over $100,000 compared to 12.1% nationally. The employment status of those at least 15 was 36 (48.0%) full-time, 18 (24.0%) part-time, and 3 (4.0%) unemployed.

== Education ==
Albury School is a co-educational state primary school covering years 1 to 6, with a roll of 24 as of July 2026. The school was founded in 1882. It currently has two classrooms, one for years 1 and 2 and one for years 3 to 6. Most children go on to the high school in Fairlie (Mackenzie College).

== Water supply ==
The water supply for the village and those close to SH8 comes from the Downlands scheme. Most of the district is served by the Albury Rural Water Scheme that supplies water for both stock and homesteads. Prior to these schemes houses would pump water from the rivers, or get it from an open water race that was built for stock and human use. Remnants of the water race supplying Mt Nessing Station (A very large farm or ranch greater than 8000 acres (32 km^{2})) can be seen on the Mt Nessing Golf Club's course. Water for the Albury Scheme is taken from a tributary branch of the Little Opawa River. This scheme was built in the late 1960s/early 1970s and uses no pumps – the system is driven by gravity. It was served by one low dam until 2000–2002 when another branch of the river was dammed to increase the water flow to the headworks. This was necessary as water flow was becoming too low in the original branch. Filtering for the scheme is performed by a long, dual channel trough that contains various grade of gravel with the coarsest at the bottom (Sand Filter). Little maintenance is required apart from periodic flushing of the filter by flowing water backwards through it.

== Picture gallery ==
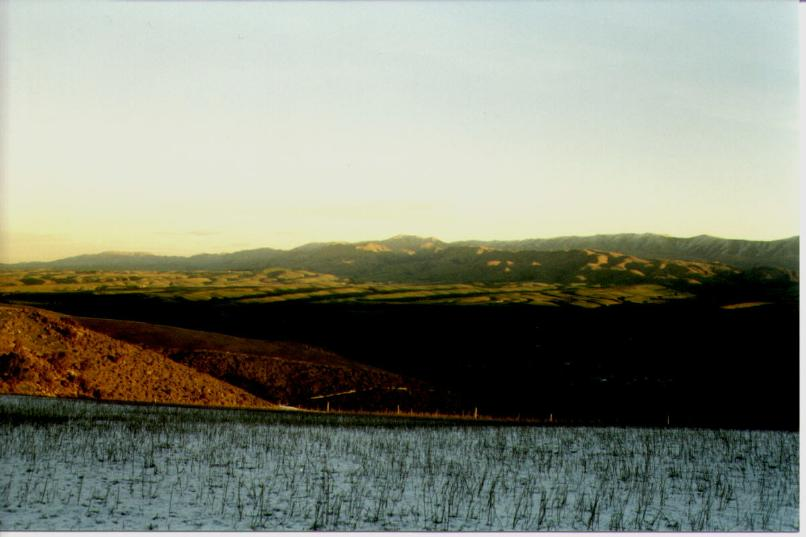
Taken from hills NE of Albury.

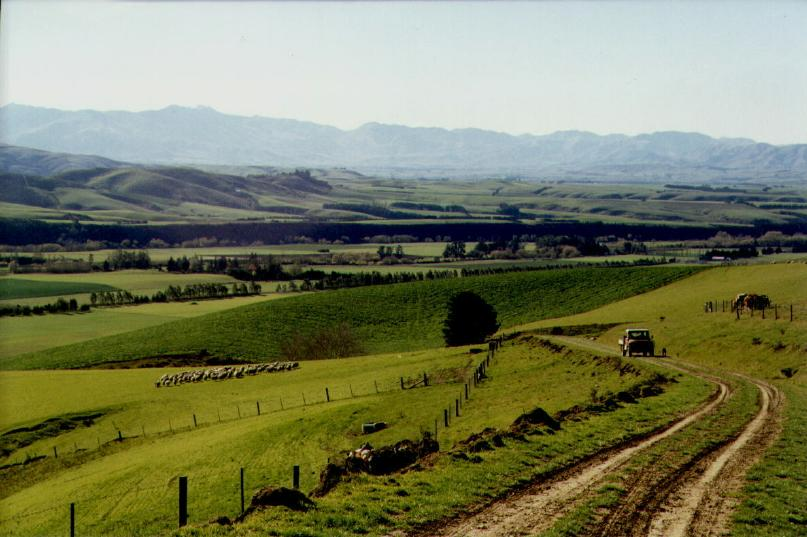
Looking from Mt Nessing area towards Fairlie

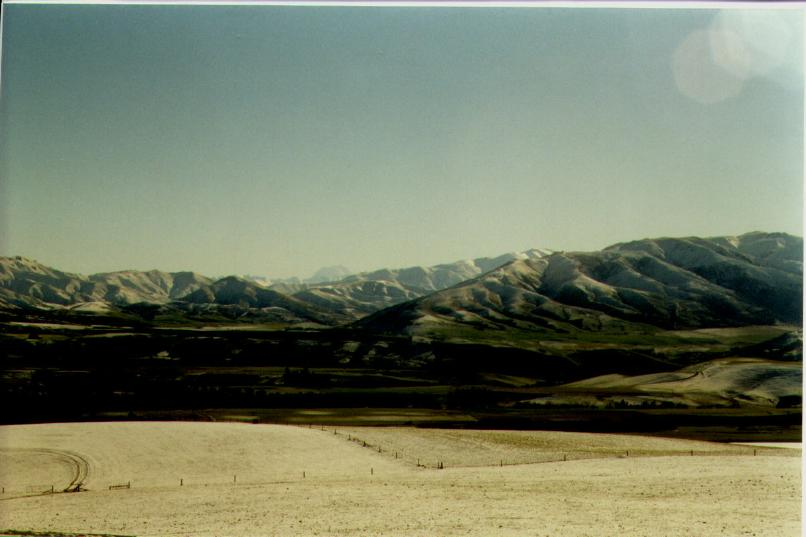
Looking from Mt Nessing area with Aoraki / Mount Cook in the distance

== Local clubs and organisations ==
- Mount Nessing Collie Club
- Mount Nessing Golf Club
- Rural Women (Formerly Women's Division of Federated Farmers)

== Local events ==
Every year around March/April the Albury Pub/Tavern/Bar is the destination of a mountain bicycle race. The race is called the "Pass to Pub". The race goes for about 35 km from Burkes Pass to the Albury Tavern. Local organisations put on barbecues and sell items for fundraising activities at the end.
