= Albury End =

Hamlet in Hertfordshire, England

Coordinates: 51.894°N 00.076°E

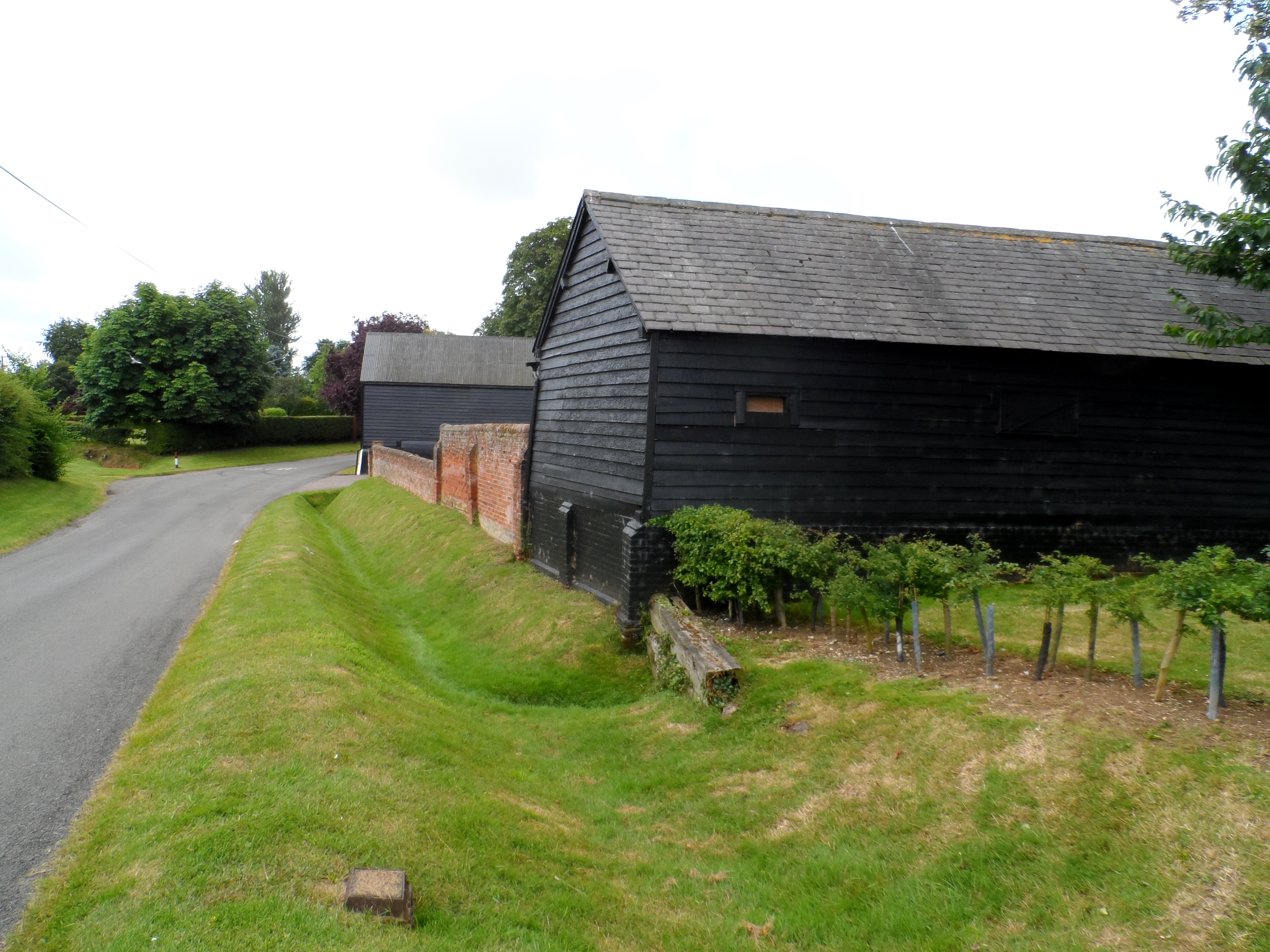
- Barns at Albury End

- Location within Hertfordshire
- OS grid reference: TL4223
- District: East Hertfordshire
- Shire county: Hertfordshire
- Region: East
- Country: England
- Sovereign state: United Kingdom
- Post town: Ware
- Postcode district: SG11
- Police: Hertfordshire
- Fire: Hertfordshire
- Ambulance: East of England
- UK Parliament: North East Hertfordshire

Albury End is a hamlet in Hertfordshire, England. It is in the civil parish of Albury.
