= Terry J. Albury =

American whistleblower and former FBI agent

Terry Albury
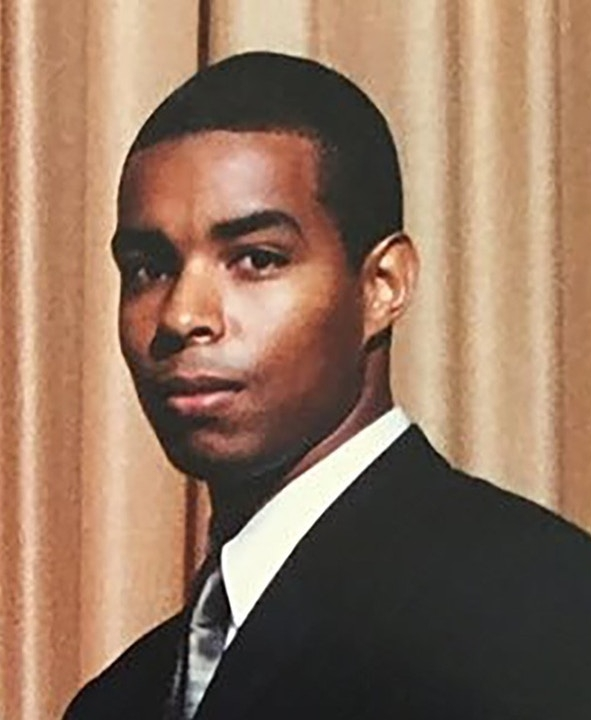
- Terry Albury, circa 2001
- Born: Terry J. Albury; Santa Rosa, California, U.S.
- Education: Berea College (BA)
- Known for: Classified document disclosure of racial discrimination by the FBI to The Intercept
- Criminal charge: Violating the Espionage Act
- Criminal penalty: 4 years in prison

Terry J. Albury is an American former FBI agent convicted of leaking documents to news site The Intercept detailing secret guidelines for the FBI’s use of informants and the surveillance of journalists and religious and ethnic minority and immigrant communities. The documents formed the basis for a series of articles in The Intercept called "The FBI's Secret Rules".

== Early life and education ==
Albury was born and raised in Santa Rosa, California. he was the son of Ethiopian immigrants. At the age of 13, he was sent to attend Mountain Mission School in Grundy, Virginia. He later earned a Bachelor of Arts degree in sociology from Berea College.

== Career ==
Albury was a 17-year veteran of the FBI. He stated that he was motivated to inform the public about the systematic racist and xenophobic practices he witnessed as the only black agent in the Minneapolis field office, and the son of an Ethiopian refugee as he was tasked with surveillance of Muslim and immigrant communities.

After leaking documents to The Intercept which formed the basis for a series called "The FBI's Secret Rules", Albury was indicted under the Espionage Act of 1917. In 2018, he pled guilty and was sentenced to four years in prison.

Albury's was the second leak case charged under the Espionage Act under President Donald Trump. Civil liberties and press freedom advocates spoke out against Albury's prosecution under the Espionage Act, and called for an end to its use against those who "act in good faith to bring government misconduct to the attention of the public".

Albury was incarcerated at the Federal Correctional Institution, Englewood. After being released from prison in November 2020, he relocated to Berkeley, California.

== See also ==
- COINTELPRO
