= Albury, Hertfordshire =

Village in Hertfordshire, England

Coordinates: 51.909992°N 0.085478°E

Albury
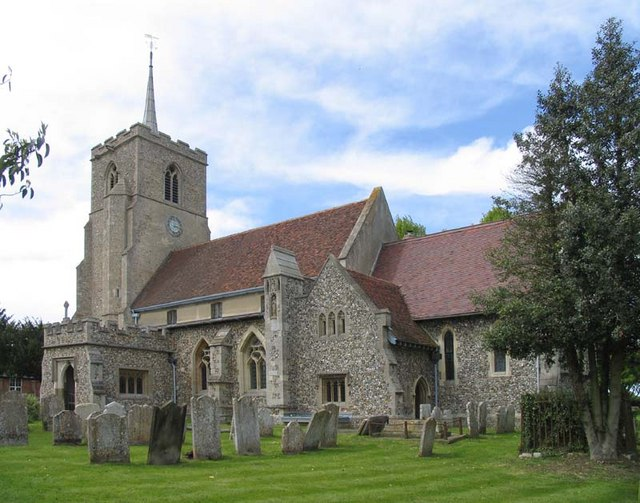
- St Mary the Virgin, Albury

- Location within Hertfordshire
- Population: 599 (Parish, 2021)
- OS grid reference: TL4324
- District: East Hertfordshire
- Shire county: Hertfordshire
- Region: East
- Country: England
- Sovereign state: United Kingdom
- Post town: Ware
- Postcode district: SG11
- Dialling code: 01279
- Police: Hertfordshire
- Fire: Hertfordshire
- Ambulance: East of England

Albury is a village and civil parish in the East Hertfordshire district of Hertfordshire, England. It lies 5 miles (8 km) west of Bishop's Stortford, and 8 miles (13 km) north-east of Ware, its post town. At the 2021 census the parish had a population of 599.

Albury lies between Little Hadham to the south and Furneux Pelham to the north. The parish includes the hamlets Albury End, Clapgate, Patmore Heath and Upwick Green. The 1894–1895 edition of The Comprehensive Gazetteer of England and Wales listed the hamlets: Albury End, Church End, Clapgate, Gravesend, Patmore Heath, and Upwich. An earlier gazetteer, the Imperial Gazetteer of England and Wales dated 1870–1872 stated that the north-lying Patient-End is an Albury hamlet. Gravesend and Patmore Heath are 400 metres apart. The name "Albury" derives from the Old English ald (old) and burh (fortification).

To the north-west of the village stood Albury Hall, a three-storey manor house believed to have been re-built by MP John Calvert, around 1780 after an earlier house was demolished. Calvert's son, also named John and also an MP, inherited it in 1808, and successive owners modified the house, the army requisitioned it during World War II, and it was demolished around 1950.

There is one public house in Albury, The Catherine Wheel which dates from c.1765. The original building was destroyed by fire in 2004 and a replacement building on the same site reopened in 2007. Historically there were another four public houses in Albury, The Fox at Albury End (closed late 1970s), The Labour in Vain at Church End (closed in the 1950s), The Royal Oak at Clapgate (closed 1985) and Jolly Butchers at Clapgate (closed c.1900).

== See also ==
The Hundred Parishes
