= Tengawai River =

River in New Zealand

Coordinates: 44°14′56″S 171°08′14″E

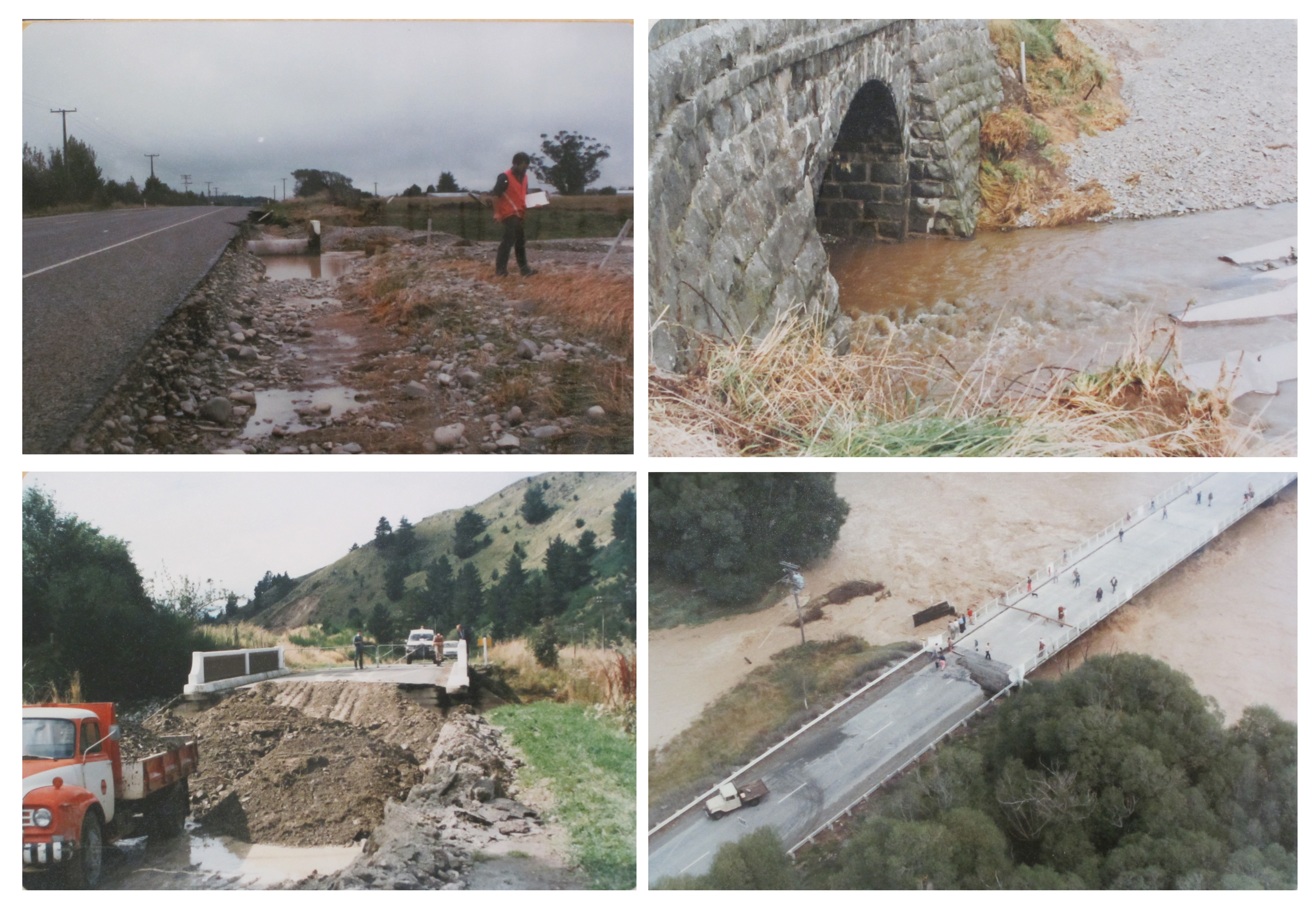
In 1986, the Tengawai River burst its banks and flooded Pleasant Point, where 1,160 people were evacuated.

The Tengawai River or Te-Ana-a-wai River is a hill-fed river and a tributary of the Ōpihi River in New Zealand's South Island.

== Geography ==
The Tengawai River flows east for 35 kilometres (22 mi) before joining the Ōpihi River at Pleasant Point, 20 kilometres (12 mi) northwest of Timaru. It is bounded by agricultural land.

== Ecology ==
The Tengawai River is open to fishing each year from 1 October to 30 April. Only brown trout and salmon are allowed to be fished.

The riverbed provides habitat for threatened river bird species, such as pīwakawaka, silvereye, and grey warbler. The vegetation buffers the river from adjoining land use activities and provides habitat to the threatened New Zealand long-tailed bat and may facilitate the dispersal and persistence of other indigenous fauna including lizards and forest birds.

== History ==
In March 1986, after strong rainfall, the Tengawai River burst its banks and flooded Pleasant Point, where 1,160 people were evacuated. This was the worst flood in the history of South Canterbury.
