= Albury Street =

Road in the London Borough of Lewisham

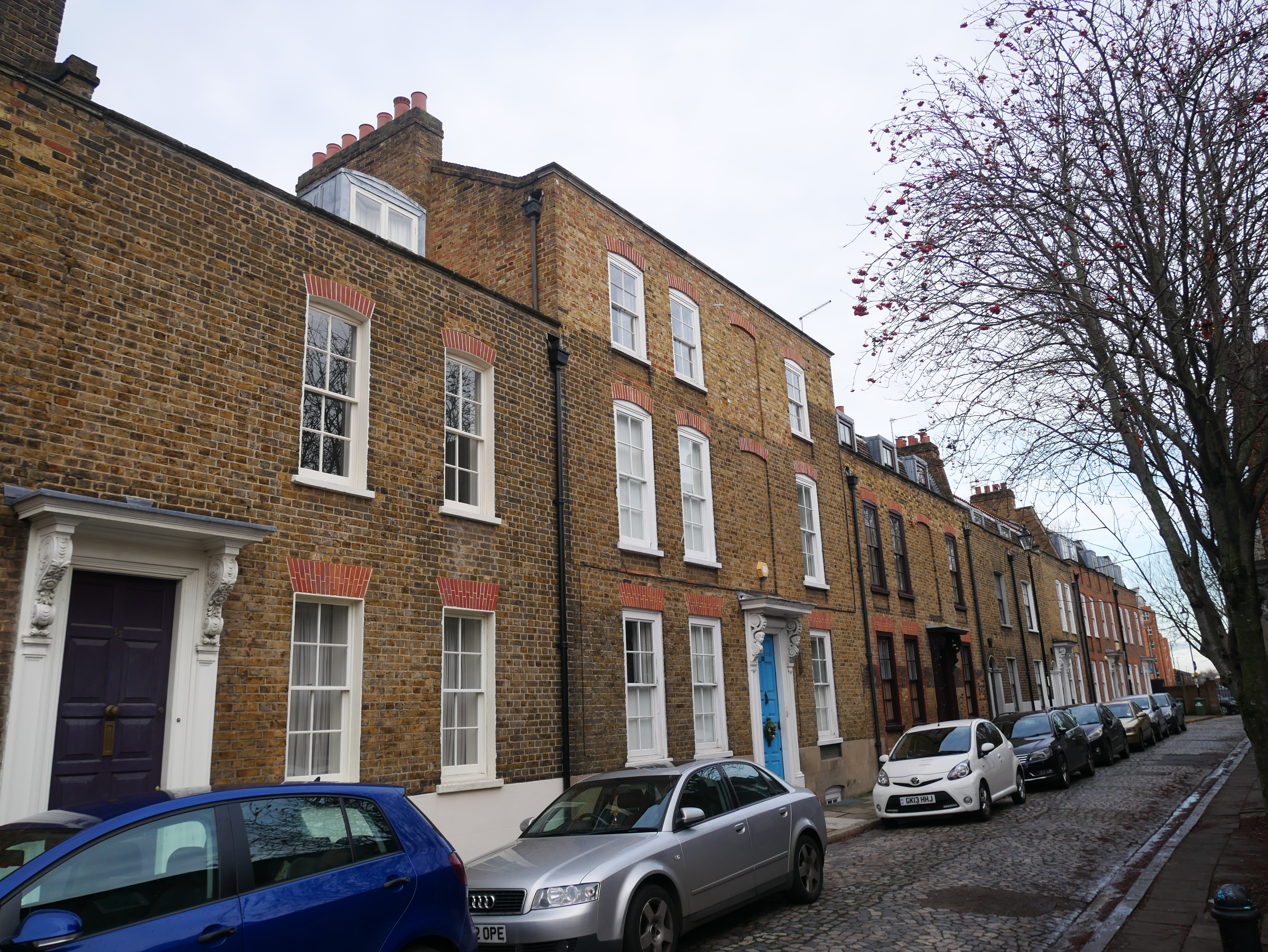
- The, better preserved, northern side of the street

- Location within London Borough of Lewisham
- Former names: Union Street, Creek Road
- Location: Deptford, London Borough of Lewisham, London
- Postal code: SE8
- Nearest Tube station: New Cross
- Coordinates: 51.4807°N 0.0255°W
- East end: A2209 Road
- West end: Deptford High Street

Albury Street is a road in Deptford in the London Borough of Lewisham, England. It runs east to west between the A2209 Road and Deptford High Street. The road was laid out in the very early 18th century, when Deptford was a village to the south of the capital. The street was developed as an enclave for officers and senior staff working at the Deptford Dockyard. It contains ten Grade II* listed buildings, and a further two listed at Grade II.

== History and description ==
Deptford (deep ford) developed as a crossing over the River Ravensbourne, a tributary of the River Thames in south London. It is referenced by Geoffrey Chaucer in the Prologue to The Reeve's Tale in his series, The Canterbury Tales. (Note: "Lo Depeford, and it is half-wey pryme. Lo Grenewych, ther many a shrewe is inne!") In 1513, Henry VIII began the development of Deptford Dockyard which grew to become one of the main victualling yards of the Royal Navy. In 1706, Thomas Lucas, a local bricklayer, undertook the construction of Albury Street, then called Union Street to celebrate the Acts of Union 1707. By 1717 he had built some forty houses on the site, provided superior accommodation for officers and officials engaged at the dockyard. The houses were of two storeys, and built of London red brick with brick dressings.

The early trade unionist John Gast (1772–1837) worked as a shipwright in the Deptford Dockyard and later ran the King of Belgium (then the King of Prussia) public house at No. 6, Albury Street. The street survived largely intact until the 1950s when a programme of conservation by the London County Council was commenced. Bridget Cherry and Nikolaus Pevsner, in their London 2: South volume in the Buildings of England series revised and reissued in 2002, describe the result as an example of "appalling bureaucratic bungling". By the early 1970s, most of the houses on the south side had been demolished and replaced by local authority housing, while many of the elaborate doorcases, which had been removed for safe storage, were lost to theft. As at 2024, only four intact houses remain on the south side, while the northern run is in a better state of preservation. Dr Anthony Quinney, professor of architecture at the University of Greenwich describes the remaining run of houses on Albury Street as; "among the few survivors in the whole of London from the first two decades of the eighteenth century and ... as one of the most important treasures architecturally and historically among domestic buildings in London".

The listed buildings on the street, all at Grade II* except No.s 39 and 41, and 45 which are listed at Grade II, comprise: No.s 13 and 15; No.17; No.s 19 and 21; No.s 23–27; No.s 29 and 31; No. 33; No.s 34–40; No. 35; No. 37; No.s 39 and 41; No. 43 and No. 45.

== Sources ==
- Cherry, Bridget; Pevsner, Nikolaus (2002). London 2: South. Buildings of England. Vol. 2. New Haven, US and London: Yale University Press. ISBN 978-0-300-09651-4. OCLC 1460672733.
