= Bill Albury (cricketer) =

Australian cricketer (born 1947)

Personal information
- Full name: William Douglas Albury
- Born: 9 February 1947 (age 79); Herston, Brisbane, Queensland, Australia
- Batting: Right-handed
- Bowling: Right-arm fast medium

Domestic team information
- Years: Team
- 1969-70 to 1973-74: Queensland

Career statistics
Competition	FC	List A
Matches	28	9
Runs scored	365	9
Batting average	11.06	2.25
100s/50s	0/0	0/0
Top score	42	4*
Balls bowled	4832	494
Wickets	75	15
Bowling average	32.18	18.66
5 wickets in innings	2	0
10 wickets in match	0	n/a
Best bowling	5/90	3/21
Catches/stumpings	14/–	3/–
- Source: Cricinfo, 9 August 2020

William Douglas Albury (born 9 February 1947) is a former Australian first-class cricketer who played for Queensland in 28 first-class matches from 1970 to 1974.

An accurate opening or first-change bowler, Bill Albury's best first-class figures were 5 for 90 (followed by 3 for 34 in the second innings) when Queensland beat Western Australia in the Sheffield Shield in 1972–73.

Albury played 42 seasons with the Brisbane club Wynnum Manly. The Wynnum Manly club home ground is named the Bill Albury Oval after him.

== See also ==
- List of Queensland first-class cricketers
