= Pleasant Point, New Zealand =

Pleasant Point
- Motto: "The name says it all"
- Interactive map of Pleasant Point
- Coordinates: 44°15′40″S 171°7′50″E
- Country: New Zealand
- Region: Canterbury
- Territorial authority: Timaru District
- Community board: Pleasant Point Community Board
- Ward: Pleasant Point-Temuka
- Settled: 1864
- Electorates: Rangitata; Te Tai Tonga (Māori)

Government
  - Territorial authority: Timaru District Council
  - Regional council: Environment Canterbury
  - Mayor of Timaru: Nigel Bowen
  - Rangitata MP: James Meager
  - Te Tai Tonga MP: Tākuta Ferris

Area
  - Total: 5.21 km^{2} (2.01 sq mi)
- Elevation: 65 m (213 ft)

Population (June 2025)
  - Total: 1,470
  - Density: 282/km^{2} (731/sq mi)
- Time zone: UTC+12 (NZST)
  - Summer (DST): UTC+13 (NZDT)
- Postcode: 7903
- Area code: 03
- Local iwi: Ngāi Tahu

Pleasant Point is a small country town in southern Canterbury, New Zealand, some 19 km (12 mi) inland from Timaru, on State Highway 8. It is a service town for the surrounding farming district. One of its main attractions is the heritage railway, the Pleasant Point Museum and Railway, which operates steam locomotives and one of only two Model T Ford railcar replicas in the world. It attracts about 10,000 people a year. For almost one hundred years, the Fairlie branch line railway passed through the town. It closed on 2 March 1968, and the heritage line utilises 2.5 km (1.6 mi) of track along the branch's old route.

Pleasant Point is also known for glassblowing, taxidermy, blacksmithing and custard squares, and Māori rock art can be viewed nearby. Vineyards have also been established in the area. It also has two primary schools, a preschool and a play centre. Pleasant Point High School was closed by the Labour government in 2004. It has two rivers nearby, the Ōpihi and the TeNgawai; the two rivers meet just to the north of the town.

A 1901 census placed the town's population at 749.

== Naming ==
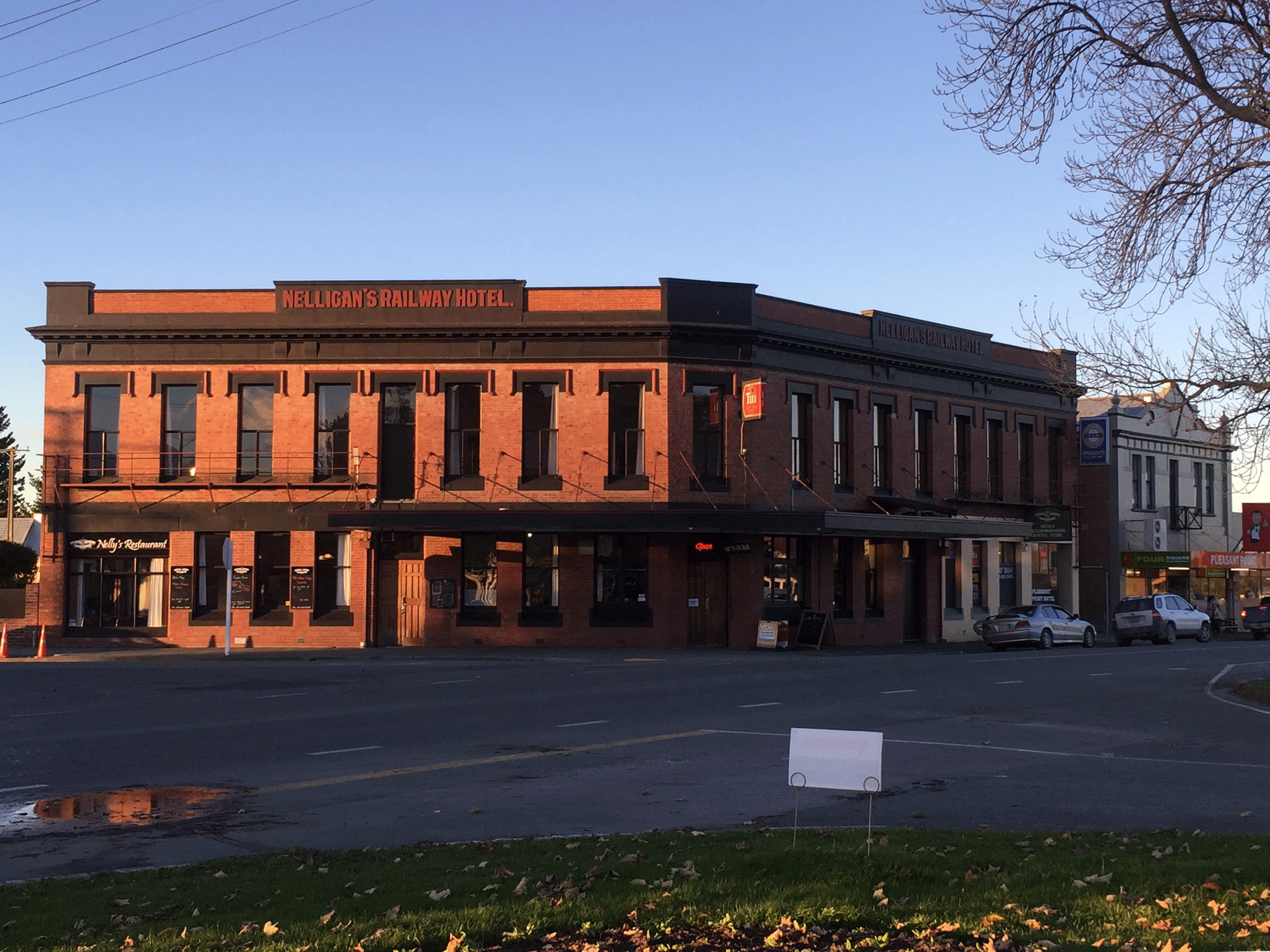
Pleasant Point Hotel, 2017

"Pleasant Point" was not always the town's name. During the early colonial period of the 1800s, wagoners would travel from Timaru to the Mackenzie Country, to access the area's rich hunting grounds. These trips would take three to six weeks for a return trip, as the land was mainly tussock, flaxes and matagouri, with few tracks. These wagoners would stop at campsites along the way, a popular one being "The Point". The identity of the "point" itself is unknown and the subject of speculation and theories, which include it's being the place at which the Te Ngawai (Tengawai) and Ōpihi rivers meet. Another theory suggests the point is the cut in the hill, possibly at the foot of Manse Road, as this is where the town was established. The Point grew into one of the most popular camps along the route, and campers started referring to it as Pleasant Point because of the access to food and water for the horses, the fully stocked hotel and the pleasant surroundings.

== Street names ==
As early as 1870 the streets of Pleasant Point had been named and surveyed, although these names were not publicised, and this led to many streets being referred to by landmarks. Halstead Road was often called School Road, due to the school being located there. Harris Street was known as Church Street as it was the location of the first Anglican church. The Main Road was often referred to as Dominion Street, presumably linked to New Zealand's declaration as a Dominion.

However, as the township began to grow, street names became a necessity and streets were signposted. The town was divided up into sections. Streets to the south of the railway line have Afghan names. This is presumably linked to the Anglo-Afghan wars that were making the news at the time. The streets in the northern part of the town are named after early settlers to the area or notable people who own property in the locality. William Halstead was a fellmonger who owned land on Halstead Road. John Porter Harris owned the land on Harris Street, although early maps call the street Le Cren Street after Henry John Le Cren who used to own the land. The streets in the western part are named after native trees.

== Demographics ==
Pleasant Point is described by Statistics New Zealand as a small urban area. It covers 5.21 km^{2} (2.01 sq mi) and had an estimated population of 1,470 as of June 2025, with a population density of 282 people per km^{2}.

Historical population
| Year | Pop. | ±% p.a. |
|---|---|---|
| 2006 | 1,194 | — |
| 2013 | 1,302 | +1.24% |
| 2018 | 1,371 | +1.04% |
| 2023 | 1,428 | +0.82% |

Pleasant Point had a population of 1,428 in the 2023 New Zealand census, an increase of 57 people (4.2%) since the 2018 census, and an increase of 126 people (9.7%) since the 2013 census. There were 711 males, 711 females, and 6 people of other genders in 600 dwellings. 2.1% of people identified as LGBTIQ+. The median age was 45.9 years (compared with 38.1 years nationally). There were 246 people (17.2%) aged under 15 years, 213 (14.9%) aged 15 to 29, 642 (45.0%) aged 30 to 64, and 327 (22.9%) aged 65 or older.

People could identify as more than one ethnicity. The results were 91.6% European (Pākehā); 12.2% Māori; 1.1% Pasifika; 2.5% Asian; 0.2% Middle Eastern, Latin American and African New Zealanders (MELAA); and 4.2% other, which includes people giving their ethnicity as "New Zealander". English was spoken by 97.7%, Māori by 2.3%, and other languages by 4.0%. No language could be spoken by 1.9% (e.g. too young to talk). New Zealand Sign Language was known by 0.4%. The percentage of people born overseas was 10.1, compared with 28.8% nationally.

Religious affiliations were 33.6% Christian, 0.2% Hindu, 0.6% Māori religious beliefs, 0.2% Buddhist, 0.4% New Age, and 1.1% other religions. People who answered that they had no religion were 55.0%, and 8.8% of people did not answer the census question.

Of those at least 15 years old, 183 (15.5%) people had a bachelor's or higher degree, 714 (60.4%) had a post-high school certificate or diploma, and 288 (24.4%) people exclusively held high school qualifications. The median income was $40,000, compared with $41,500 nationally. 108 people (9.1%) earned over $100,000 compared to 12.1% nationally. The employment status of those at least 15 was 600 (50.8%) full-time, 156 (13.2%) part-time, and 12 (1.0%) unemployed.

== Saleyards ==
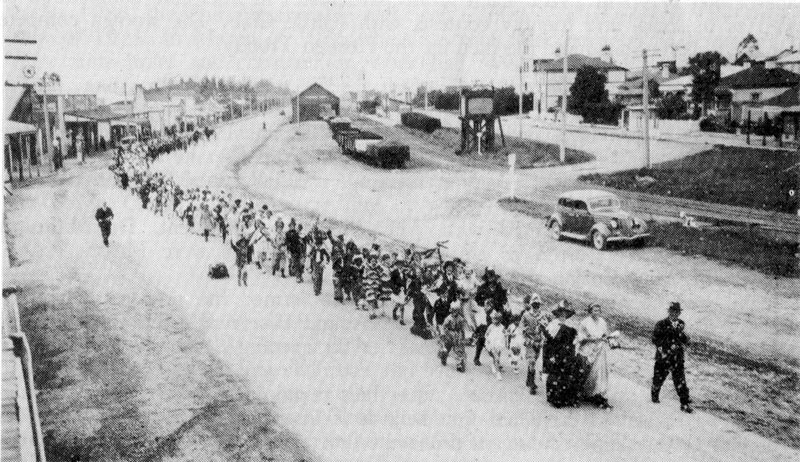
Procession for Bowling Carnival circa 1938, led by Mr H. Christie and the two Carnival Queens, D. Chapman and D. Murphy

Early on, Pleasant Point was recognised as a centre for buying and selling stock. The first stockmarket in South Canterbury was held in Pleasant Point on 8 December 1871.

A report in the Timaru Herald on 2 November 1881 read as follows:

On Monday, the yards erected by the Pleasant Point Saleyards Company were opened. The capacity of the cattle yards was fully tested by an entry of four hundred head and the opinion was freely expressed that the Company will require to complete their original design. This they have been unable to do through the want of support by a number of persons who entered cordially into the preliminary arrangements and have not taken up shares so freely as the management was led to anticipate.

The commodious sheep pens were not greatly patronised, the present season not being favourable for large sales of sheep but this department is pretty certain to be a prominent feature in future sales. Having secured a site of four acres, the Directors have provided for ample development which may be fairly predicted for the business of a centre commanding such a large and agriculturally thriving district. The Levels Road Board have lately removed a very narrow bridge in the immediate vicinity and erected a substantial structure giving free access to the Company‘s grounds.

The auctioneers were Jones, Wildie, Allan and Stumbles and Maclean and Stewart and, with the very large attendance, the day's proceedings were probably satisfactory. The Directors have arranged a very liberal scale of charges for travelling stock, drafting purposes, etc., and there is no doubt shareholders will be handsomely paid for their enterprises.

By 1896 the saleyards were the largest in South Canterbury; by 1905 they were the second largest saleyards in Canterbury, behind Addington in Christchurch. In the early 1970s the Pleasant Point directors approached the Temuka Saleyard Company with the suggestion of the two companies amalgamating, and in 1979 the Pleasant Point Saleyards closed.

== Cyclemakers ==
The Cyclemakers Group started production in Pleasant Point in October 1981 with Ian Hooker as managing director.

The firm started off with ten staff, and designed and manufactured bicycles on a Te Ngawai Road site. By 1989 the business employed around 35 people. The factory was completely destroyed by fire in April 1990 and the firm then relocated to Washdyke.

== Education ==
Pleasant Point currently has 2 primary schools and a preschool.

Pleasant Point Primary School is a full primary for years 1 to 8 with a roll of 238 students as of July 2026.

St Joseph's School is a Catholic state-integrated primary for years 1 to 8 with a roll of 47 students as of July 2026.

Pleasant Point High also existed until 2004, when it was closed by the government. This closure meant high school students had to go to other schools, primarily in Timaru. A school in Pleasant Point was first suggested and opened in 1868. It was located on Tengawai Road. By 1871 the school had been moved to a new location on Harris Street, although the school soon exceeded the available facilities and an extra room was added, by which time the school had a capacity for 200 students. In 1907 a new school was built on seven acres, at its current location on Halstead Road.

In 1911, 200 trees were planted alongside the playground as a memorial to the coronation of King George V.

In 1927, St Josephs opened.

In 2004 the government closed the high school, which resulted in much of the school resources being given to the adjacent primary school and the remainder being sold off. The primary school underwent massive changes, with the school expanded to years 0–8 to include the intermediate students who would have attended the high school. A number of builds were also used to expand the school, whilst the gym and neighbouring courts became public for the community. The remaining buildings were sold off and eventually formed the new pre-school.

In 2018 the old concrete tennis and basketball courts outside the gymnasium were renovated to include a new artificial turf which could accommodate many different sports, including hockey, netball, and tennis.

== Disaster ==
On 13 March 1986 Pleasant Point lay witness to the worst flood in South Canterbury's history. The flood caused people in the western part of the town to be evacuated. Up to five helicopters were operating to get people to dry ground. The flood caused millions of dollars in damages.

== See also ==
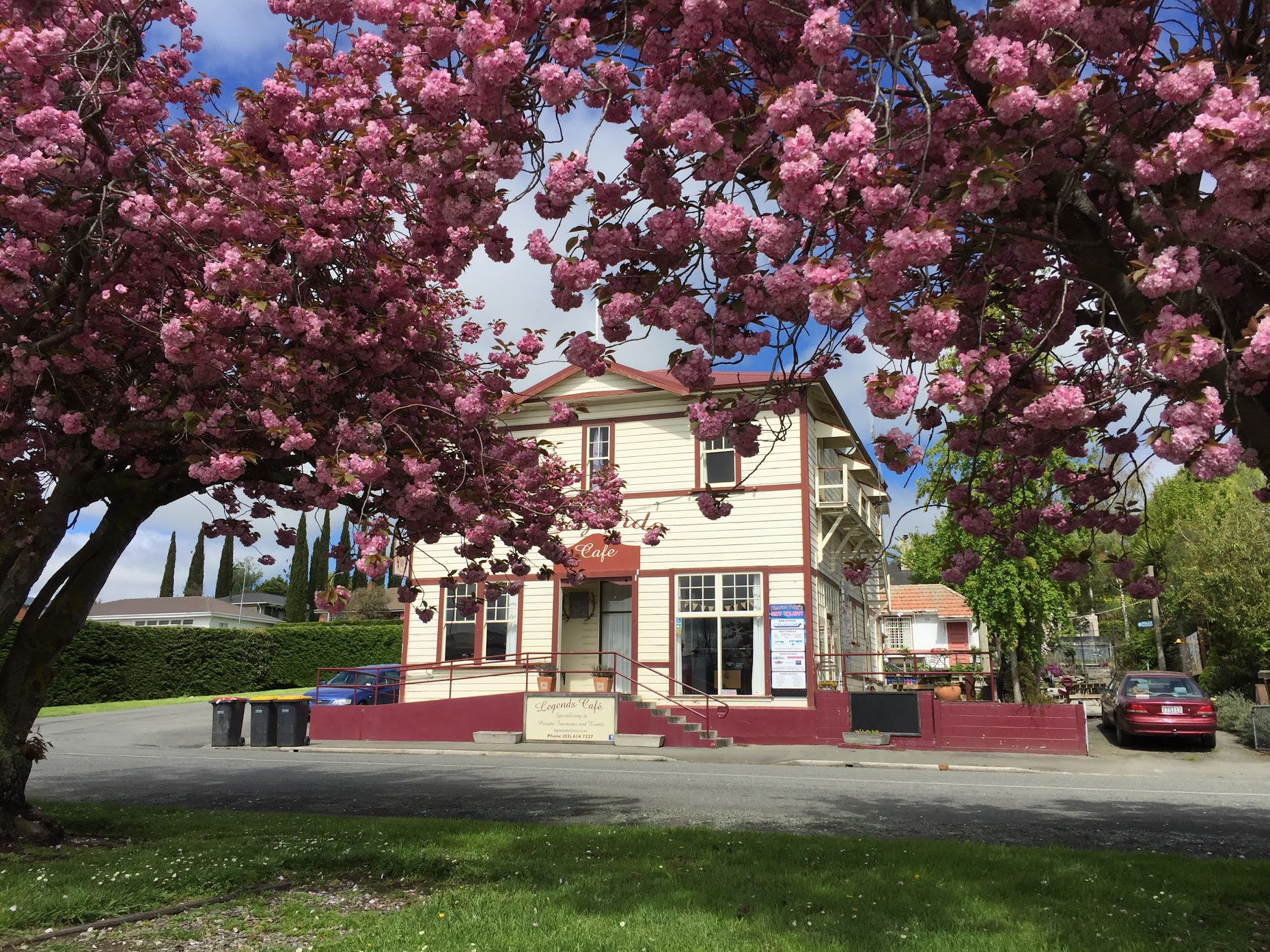
- Legends Cafe (now closed)
  Totara Valley
- Raincliff
- Waitohi
