= Lorna Ellis =

New Zealand sculptor and ceramist (1903–1981)

Lorna Ellis née Trengrove (1903 – July 1981) was a New Zealand sculptor and ceramist. Her works are held in the collection of Museum of New Zealand Te Papa Tongarewa.

== Education ==
Ellis attended the Wellington Art School for three years, at that time attached to the Technical College.

== Art career ==
Ellis was one of the first women in New Zealand to become a full-time commercial artist, and she drew mostly newspaper advertisements and illustrations for the Goldberg Advertising Agency until 1928 when she married. Her family commitments allowed little time for art until after the end of World War II. Ellis was encouraged to return to art by the Thursday Group, of which she was one of the eight foundation members in 1952. This group met on Thursday evenings for many years to draw from life.

Ellis was an artist member of the New Zealand Academy of Fine Arts from 1927, and in recognition of her service was elected a life member in 1975. From 1965 to 1974, working alongside presidents including J. O. Mercer and Reginald James Waghorn, she served as a councilor for the Academy. She was one of the longest serving members.

Ellis taught weekly art classes at the Arohata Woman's Borstal Institution, where she worked as a counsellor for 18 years. During her later years, Ellis was a member of "Group Seven", a group of artists who met at the Hutt Art Society rooms. Other members included June Tilley and Muriel Hopper. Ellis was a contemporary of artist Juliet Peter, and attended Saturday afternoon drawing sessions at Helen Barc's apartment, alongside George Woods, E. Mervyn Taylor and Douglas McDiarmid. Ellis also worked alongside potter Roy Cowan.

=== Sculpture work ===
After reading about cold-cast bronze sculpture in a book but being unable to find a tutor in this technique within New Zealand, Ellis went to England in 1958 to learn from sculptors there. She mastered the technique and brought it back to New Zealand. Ellis was primarily a sculptor, but also worked with ceramics from the early 1970s onwards, after being introduced to potter Lee Thompson's kiln. Ellis worked with Thompson's kiln alongside potter Muriel Moody.

Bronze busts of Rita Angus and E. Mervyn Taylor are held at Museum of New Zealand Te Papa Tongarewa. A bust of notable teacher Mary Mackenzie (MBE) is held at the Victoria University of Wellington library. Ellis was commissioned to produce a sculpture of Peter Field, Frances Hodgkins's nephew and guardian of the Field Painting Collection.

=== Notable exhibitions ===
- Sculpture exhibition featuring 50 sculptured heads and ceramic pieces at the Dowse Art Museum, 1976.
- 1981 Caltex Art Award for Representational Painting, Sculpture and Drawing Exhibition.
- Memorial exhibition, July 1981.

== Family life ==
Ellis married Howard Ellis in 1928 at Saint Paul's Wellington. Ellis' grandson, designer Adam Ellis, credits her with inspiring his creative journey, and has fond memories of sculpting with her in her home studio. Her son, Anthony Arthur Travers Ellis, worked as a High Court judge, chairman of the Parole Board, and president of the Electoral Commission.
