= Henry Sealy =

New Zealand surveyor (1838–1925)

Henry John Sealy (1838 – 6 June 1925) was a New Zealand surveyor and farmer.

== Early life ==
Sealy was baptised in 1838 in Coity, Glamorgan, Wales. Forebears had become rich in Barbados as plantation owners. His paternal grandparents died young and his father and aunt were brought up by relatives in England. Henry Sealy became an orphan when his father, the author Thomas Henry Sealy, died in 1848. Henry and his younger brother Edward (born 1839) were brought up by their aunt Maria Sealy.

== Surveying and farming ==
The brothers emigrated to New Zealand on the Clontarf, which arrived in Lyttelton on 5 January 1859. John Acland, a Canterbury high country runholder, was also on this ship. The brothers' intention was to proceed to Hawke's Bay but the ship lay in Lyttelton Port for a month as much of the crew had deserted. In mid-February, they set off from Wellington on the Emily Allison to meet up with their relative Henry Bowman Sealy, who lived at Patoka, inland from Napier. The family connection is uncertain, (Note: Holm (2005) states about the relative: "..., presumably an uncle, although he cannot be identified on the family tree, ...") but sources assume that he was their uncle. The brothers stayed with their relative and worked on his farm, learning the basics of farming. They also helped out land survey parties that worked in the district and during 1861, both of them worked as surveyors. Henry left for Otago on 30 August 1861 to join the Otago gold rush at Gabriel's Gully. But within a week, he sold his digging implements and worked for a storekeeper in Dunedin for the rest of the year. In early 1862, he joined a survey party in Tuapeka. After two months, he went to Napier and joined a survey team with his brother. There, he experienced the February 1863 Hawke's Bay earthquake. Soon after, his brother encouraged him to come to Canterbury to work on the West Coast, but he ended up in Geraldine in South Canterbury instead to survey that town. He worked for a telegraph company during most of 1865 and on the weekends, he worked in the Land office in Timaru. He spent Christmas 1865 with the Studholme family; they were wealthy runholders, with brothers Michael and John as heads of family. From 1866 until February 1868, he stayed with fellow surveyor Sam Hewlings when in Timaru. He fell out with Hewlings, possibly over having become interested in his daughter Fanny, and afterwards boarded at the Royal Hotel instead. Over Christmas and New Year 1867, the brothers caught up and over the space of a few days socialised with the Canterbury elite: Francis Jollie (a member of parliament) at Christmas Day, John Acland (by then a member of the Legislative Council) at Boxing Day, then on to Charles George Tripp (a large runholder) followed by Dr Ben Moorhouse (another large runholder). Moving on to Christchurch, the brothers then socialised with the family of Julius von Haast.

Henry Sealy was from March 1872 surveying between the Opuha and Orari rivers in South Canterbury. In 1874, the brothers won a tender for a survey contract further west and inland. By the end of 1874, Henry was surveying between the Pareora River and the Waitaki River. From February to May 1876, he surveyed the township of Saint Andrews; this was his last commission as a surveyor.

Henry Sealy started buying land in 1866. Initially, he purchased 12 sections in Waimate. In the following year, he purchased more land including a farm house outside of Timaru on the Brockley station. He joined the Timaru Choral Society in 1867. In 1870, he bought 100 acres (40 ha) at Glengummel, which was adjacent to Brockley; he planted 200,000 gum trees on his properties. From 1871, he spent more time working on his farms than surveying. In 1872, he bought further sections in Waimate. Christmas 1872 was spent at 'Greta Peaks' where his brother had become engaged to one of the daughters – Frances. From North Canterbury, the party moved to Christchurch to spend time new year's with the von Haast family. During 1874, he bought land in Waimate, Arowhenua (since renamed Temuka), and near Timaru. In 1875, he bought a farm and rented reserves. Purchases included 140 fruit trees, 300 pine trees, and 684 sheep. During 1876, he took loans of NZ£1500 and later in the year another NZ£3000. In September 1876, he applied for 204 acres (83 ha) that was available if it was to be planted in trees.

== Family ==
Henry first mentioned Emma Askin in his diary in January 1873. They met through their shared love for music. Her family had come to New Zealand for her father to manage a bank in Wellington, but they all fell ill with typhus on the journey and her father died within a week of arrival in 1856. Her stepmother had an entrepreneurial streak, set up a school and brought up the children. Her stepmother remarried to Timaru. Henry Sealy and Emma Askin married on 17 July 1873 at St Mary's Church in Timaru. The honeymoon was spent in Napier with his uncle. Upon their return to Timaru, Henry went surveying and his wife went to stay with her stepmother as they had nowhere else to live. His brother, meanwhile, had started building a house on his run Southerndown in preparation for his marriage. Edward Sealy's house was ready when they returned from their honeymoon in Sydney and Melbourne in January 1874, and Emma and Henry Sealy moved in with them. Henry Sealy owned the adjacent section of 50 acres (20 ha), Heathcliffe, where they built their house. They moved into Heathcliffe in November 1874.
