= Muriel Moody =

New Zealand artist (1907–1991)

- Moody in 1988
- Born: Muriel Carrick Wilson; 18 March 1907; Whangārei, New Zealand
- Died: 24 December 1991 (aged 84); Lower Hutt, New Zealand
- Known for: Ceramics
- Spouse: Clive Robert Moody (m. 1949–1973)

Muriel Carrick Moody (née Wilson, 18 March 1907 – 24 December 1991) was a New Zealand commercial artist, welfare worker, sculptor and potter.

== Biography ==
Moody was born in Whangārei, New Zealand on 18 March 1907, the second of six children of John Munro Wilson and Mildred Carrick Proude. Her mother was a talented pianist and loved to sketch, and encouraged her children to develop their talents.

Moody attended Palmerston North Girls' High School, where she showed signs of talent with drawing — the 1925 school magazine contained two of her sketches. After finishing school, Moody worked in Palmerston North as a commercial artist and continued to study art with lessons from Harry Richardson.

In the mid-1930s, Moody moved to Christchurch and became head of advertising for the central city department store Ballantynes. There she met other artists such as Rita Angus and Louise Henderson, and took lessons in etching from Dorothy Turner.

In 1941, Moody joined the British YWCA War Service and worked closely with the director of welfare for the Far East, fellow New Zealander Jean Begg. Moody spent seven years in England, Egypt, Ceylon (now Sri Lanka) and India setting up residential, recreation and welfare clubs for servicewomen. In 1946 she worked in Japan to open clubs for women of the British Commonwealth Occupation Forces, including a Muriel Wilson hostel.

After a year in Sydney, Australia, receiving treatment for tuberculosis, Moody returned to New Zealand and married public servant Clive Robert Moody, known as Bob Moody, in 1949. They settled in Days Bay, near Wellington, where Moody set up kilns and began to specialise in pottery. In the 1950s she attended ceramics classes at the Petone technical college with Wilf Wright, June Black, Mary Hardwick-Smith, Lee Thompson, Roy Cowan and Juliet Peter.

Moody died on 24 December 1991 at Lower Hutt Hospital. Her works of art are held in various private collections in New Zealand, Britain, Switzerland and the United States, as well as in several New Zealand galleries and institutions such as the Dowse Art Museum and the Suter Art Gallery. In addition, a stylised cross of ceramic tiles constructed by Moody is displayed on an exterior wall of the Barber Memorial Chapel at Samuel Marsden Collegiate School in Karori, Wellington.

In 2015, some of her pottery was included in the 50th anniversary exhibition of New Zealand Potters, entitled "Flora Christeller & Friends - A Retrospective Exhibition".

== Works of art ==
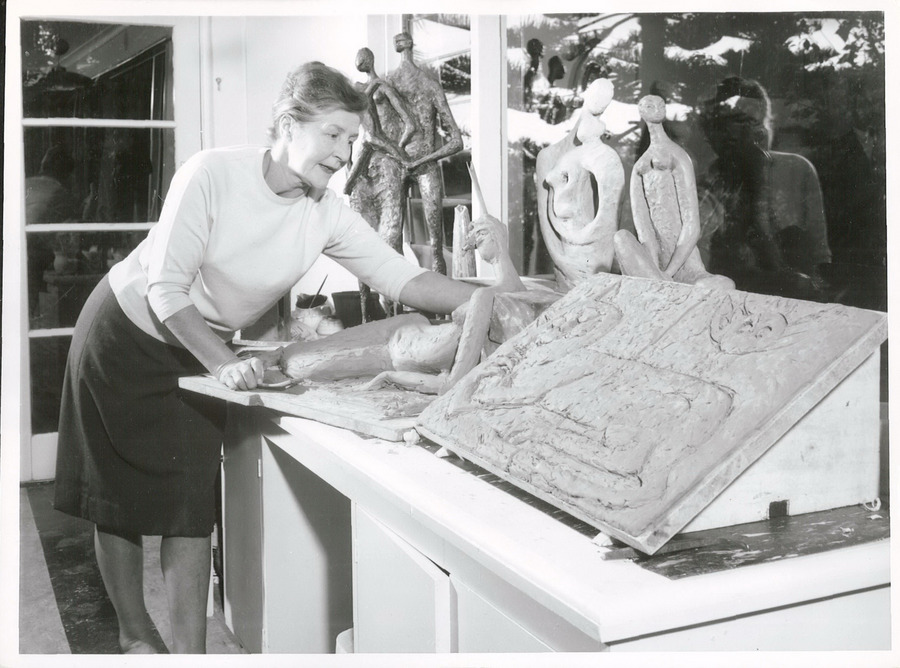
Moody at work in her home, 1965

Moody's ceramics show an interest in Picasso, and are typically based on the human body, birds, animals or mythical creatures. Her human forms often represent the movements and bodies of Middle Eastern and Asian people, possibly a result of her years spent in those parts of the world during the war. Not only did she spend time observing the local people, but she also studied art with local experts, such as an Egyptian sculptor while stationed in that country.

Moody explored ceramics as an alternate way to produce sculpture, as opposed to metals casting which was a challenging medium considering the available resources at the time. “She and June Black were the only two ceramicists in Wellington who were working consistently in sculpture during the early years of pottery, and most techniques, particularly with larger pieces, she had had to invent for herself. She builds her figures round a series of steel rods or armatures which are removed when the clay is able to stand up by itself.”

Aside from ceramics, Moody also cast bronze sculptures, and in her later years painted and decorated the pottery of others; just before her death, she also began to experiment with batik methods on silk fabric.

Moody's organisational skills led her to the position of the inaugural president of the New Zealand Society of Potters. In addition, in the late 1960s and early 1970s she was an executive member of the New Zealand Crafts Council, and for many years was involved with setting up exhibitions for the Society of Potters, the New Zealand Academy of Fine Arts and the Crafts Council.

During her lifetime, Moody exhibited with the Auckland Society of Fine Arts, the New Zealand Academy of Fine Arts, and the New Zealand Society of Potters.
