= Avis Higgs =

New Zealand textile designer and artist (1918–2016)

- Born: Avis Winifred Higgs; 21 September 1918; Wellington, New Zealand
- Died: 14 October 2016 (aged 98)
- Education: Wellington East Girls' College
- Occupation: Textile designer
- Parent(s): Sydney Hamlet Higgs; Winifred Higgs (née Patterson)
- Relatives: Marie Higgs (sister)
- Website: avishiggs.com

Avis Winifred Higgs (21 September 1918 – 14 October 2016) was a New Zealand textile designer and painter.

== Education ==
Higgs was born in 1918 in Wellington into a family of artists. Both her great grandfather and her grandfather were highly regarded Tasmanian landscape painters. Avis’s father, Sydney Higgs, was a well-known Wellington watercolourist who exhibited at the New Zealand Academy of Arts between 1921 and 1971. She attended Wellington East Girls' College and in February 1936 enrolled at the Art School of Wellington Technical College. In 1937 Higgs was awarded second place in a poster design competition organised by the Wellington Council of the League of Nations, and was described by the director of the school as "one of our best senior students". Higgs was awarded a 'Special Art Scholarship' at the end of the 1937 academic year. She did not complete her course in design but was recommended by one of her tutors for a design position at National Distributors Ltd in Wellington, where Higgs undertook lettering and poster design work and learned the principles of screenprinting. With the outbreak of the Second World War Higgs resigned from National Distributors and trained as a nurse, but while on section at Wellington Hospital she contracted diphtheria.

== Australian career ==
in 1941, following her illness, an aunt suggested a convalescent holiday in Sydney, and Higgs resigned from nursing to accept this offer.

In Australia Higgs applied for a role at Sydney firm Silk & Textile Printers, and after only three months was made Head of Design. Higgs remained as head designer from 1941 to 1946. Here Higgs drew on the Sydney environment for her textiles designs, especially nearby Bondi Beach, resulting in patterns featuring sailing boots, water skiers, surfers, seashells and sun umbrellas.

== New Zealand career ==
Higgs returned to New Zealand in 1948 and worked as a commercial artist at Screens Advertising, a company which designed cinema advertisements. As in Australia Higgs drew on her surroundings for her work, creating designs based on native plants, flowers, and Māori taonga held at the Dominion Museum (now known as the Museum of New Zealand Te Papa Tongarewa). She created modernist designs incorporating koru and other symbols derived from Māori carvings and produced her own textiles.

In 1951 Higgs travelled to England. She became an agent for a Parisian textile designer and also worked as a freelance textile designer. She was badly hurt in a car accident in Italy and returned to New Zealand in 1952 after months in hospital in Rome. In 1954 Higgs' father encouraged her to enter some of her earlier textile designs into a New Zealand Academy of Arts craft exhibition, where the designs attracted press attention. However the trauma of her car accident spelled the end of Higgs’ career as a textile designer, and painting became her focus.

In the 1950s and 1960s Higgs was a very active member of the Wellington artistic community, including the New Zealand Academy of Fine Arts, the Wellington Architectural Centre Gallery and the Helen Hitchings Gallery. She exhibited throughout New Zealand and won several awards, including the National Bank award for watercolour in 1964.

In 1999 Higgs was included in The Eighties Show at The Dowse Art Museum, an exhibition of artists who were still active in their eighties, including Doreen Blumhardt, John Drawbridge, Roy Cowan and Juliet Peter. In 2001 her life and work was the subject of a survey exhibition and publication by design historian Douglas Lloyd-Jenkins, Avis Higgs: joie de vivre. She died on 14 October 2016, aged 98.

== Recognition ==
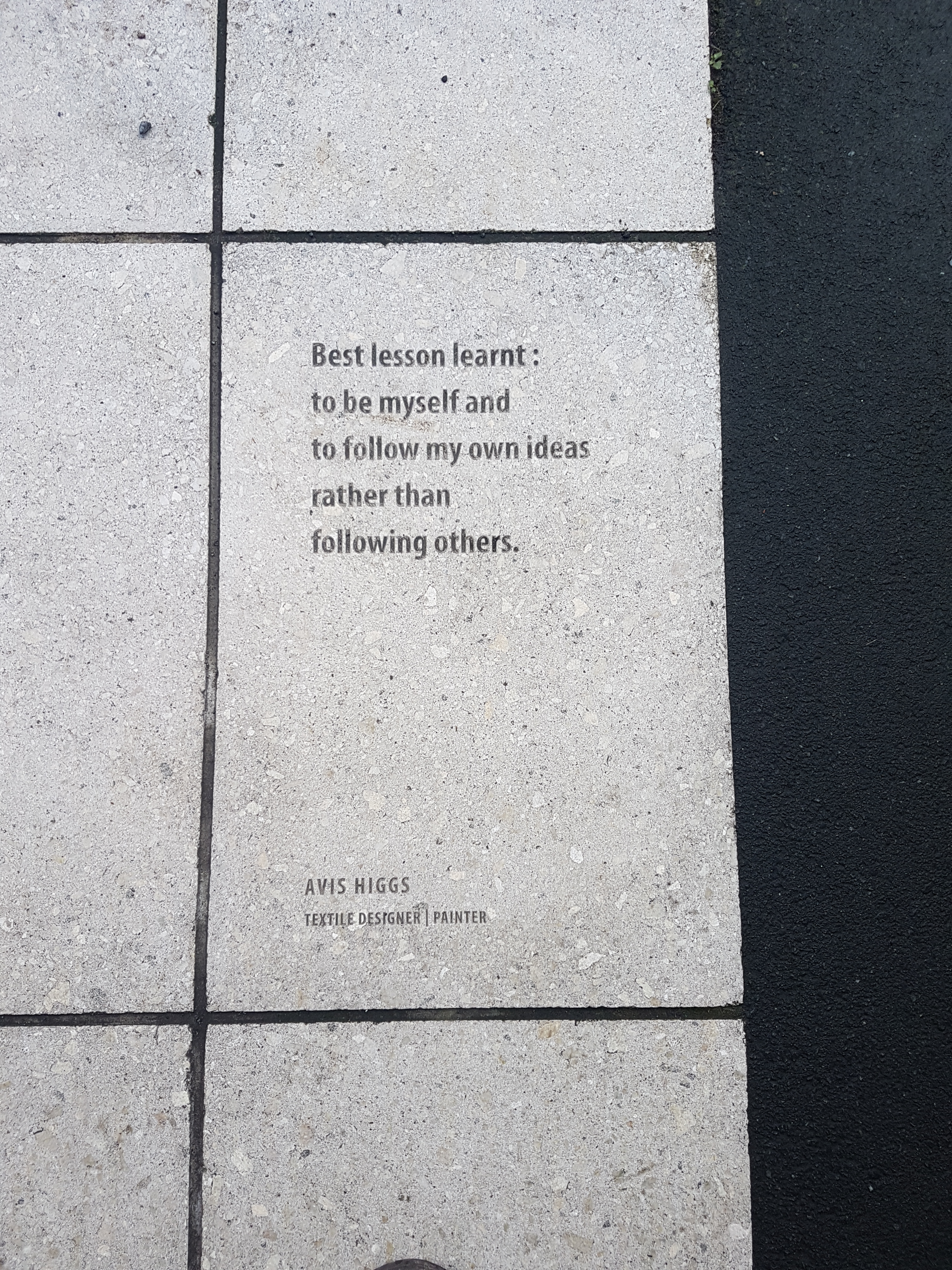
Plaque with a quote from Avis Higgs in Tinakore Village, Wellington

1937: Second place in League of Nations' national poster design competition for the best poster symbolising peace.

1945: Commonwealth Government commendation from the Australian Federal Treasurer and Prime Minister Ben Chifley, received for her work designing textiles for the war effort with Victory Loan campaign slogans.

1964: Winner of the National Bank of New Zealand Art award for watercolour painting.

1968: Special Merit prize from the National Bank of New Zealand for watercolour painting.

1985: Winner of the IBM New Zealand Fine Arts Award. In 2006 Higgs was awarded the Governor-General’s Art Award for her contribution to New Zealand art, and given a retrospective of her work at the New Zealand Academy of Fine Arts.

Higgs was inducted into the College of Creative Arts Toi Rauwharangi (Massey University) Hall of Fame in 2010, along with ceramicist Manos Nathan. Higgs has also been named as one of the five most important Australian designers in the 20th century by the Australian Ministry of Culture.

== Exhibitions ==
1999: The Eighties Show, The Dowse Art Museum
2000: Avis Higgs: joie de vivre, Hawke's Bay Museum and Art Gallery (now MTG Hawke's Bay)
