= Roy Cowan =

New Zealand artist

Roy Cowan CNZM MBE
- Born: James Robson Cowan; 5 January 1918; Wellington, New Zealand
- Died: 17 July 2006 (aged 88); Wellington, New Zealand
- Education: Wellington Teachers' Training College; Slade School of Fine Art
- Known for: Pottery, printmaking, illustration
- Spouse: Juliet Peter (m. 1952)
- Awards: Governor-General Art Award (1988)
- Elected: Fellow of the New Zealand Academy of Fine Arts (1988)

James Robson "Roy" Cowan CNZM MBE (5 January 1918 – 17 July 2006) was a New Zealand potter, illustrator, and printmaker. His wife Juliet Peter was also a New Zealand potter, printmaker, and sculptor.

== Early life ==
Roy Cowan, the son of New Zealand writer James Cowan, was born in Wellington on 5 January 1918. His mother, Eileen, was the daughter of Ngāpuhi interpreter and genealogist Henry Stowell. Cowan was educated at Wellington College, and he then went to Wellington Teachers' Training College, where he first met artist Roland Hipkins, who influenced and encouraged his artistic pursuits. From 1940 to 1945 he served in the New Zealand Fleet Air Arm. In 1952 he married potter Juliet Peter.

== Career ==
Cowan held his first exhibition at the French Maid Coffee House in 1947. He also held exhibitions at New Zealand’s first modern dealer gallery, the Wellington-based Helen Hitchings Gallery.

In 1953, he travelled with Juliet Peter to London, where he studied at the Slade School of Fine Art through an Association of New Zealand Art Societies Scholarship. He worked for the Education Department in the School Publications branch from 1955. The following year, he began beginning experimenting with pottery, and resigned from the Education Department in 1959 to become a full-time potter.

In an interview in Art New Zealand, Cowan and Peter's “most significant contribution to modernism” was described as “studio pottery – both through their own pottery, and their contribution to the New Zealand Potter magazine which they helped start in 1957.” Their contribution to ceramics is “significant” as they operated largely outside of Bernard Leach’s pervasive teachings which emphasised Anglo-Oriental pottery practices.

At a time when knowledge and use of oil-fired kilns in New Zealand was limited, Cowan built and experimented with oil-fired kilns, assisting other potters and contributing to wider knowledge of kiln-building and firing. In 1966 he was awarded a QEII Arts Council grant to study kiln design, firing processes and material.

Cowan worked for the QEII Arts Council and the Department of Foreign Affairs as a commissioner, curating touring exhibitions of New Zealand art for international audiences. As well as exhibiting with the New Zealand Academy of Fine Arts, he worked on its Council.

In 1999 Cowan was included in The Eighties Show at The Dowse Art Museum, an exhibition of artists who were still active in their eighties, including Doreen Blumhardt, John Drawbridge, Juliet Peter, and Avis Higgs.

His work was shown alongside Juliet Peter’s in 2014 at The Dowse Art Museum in A Modest Modernism: Roy Cowan and Juliet Peter.

Through the 1950s and 1960s Cowan was a frequently used Artist for various publications issued by the New Zealand Government, particularly the School Publications division of the Department of Education. His illustration and photography work is found in many School Journals and School Bulletins of that period.

== Honours ==
In 1945, Cowan was appointed a Member of the Order of the British Empire in recognition of his service in the Fleet Air Arm during World War II. In 1988, he was awarded the Governor-General Art Award and made a Fellow of the New Zealand Academy of Fine Arts. He was made a Companion of the New Zealand Order of Merit, for services to pottery, in the 2000 New Year Honours.

== Collections ==
Cowan’s work is held in the Museum of New Zealand Te Papa Tongarewa, The Dowse Art Museum, and the Christchurch Art Gallery Te Puna o Waiwhetu.

He created a large scale ceramic wall mural for the 1970 World Expo in Osaka, and a mural for the foyer of the Reserve Bank of New Zealand in Wellington. Another mural, Modern Madonna, was commissioned for the Wellington Cathedral of Saint Paul.
