= Juliet Peter =

New Zealand artist, potter, printmaker and sculptor (1915–2010)

Juliet Peter CNZM
- Born: Judith Eleanor Jane Peter; 18 September 1915; Anama, New Zealand
- Died: 12 January 2010 (aged 94); Wellington, New Zealand
- Education: Hammersmith School of Art
- Known for: Pottery; printmaking; illustration; sculpture
- Spouse: Roy Cowan (m. 1952; died 2006)
- Relatives: William Spence Peter (grandfather); Edward Sealy (grandfather)

Judith Eleanor Jane Cowan CNZM (née Peter, 18 September 1915 – 12 January 2010), generally known as Juliet Peter, was a New Zealand artist, potter, and printmaker. Her husband Roy Cowan was also a well-known New Zealand potter, printmaker, and illustrator.

== Early life ==
Peter was born at Anama in rural Mid Canterbury in 1915, and growing up on a farm there, she did not receive a formal education. Her mother was Violet Peter (1875–1926), the eldest child of the surveyor, photographer, explorer, farmer, and entomologist Edward Sealy (1839–1903) from Timaru. Her father was Charles James Peter (born 1867; died in Pape'ete, Tahiti, 5 April 1928), a son of William Spence Peter (1818–1891) who lived at Anama and served as a member of the Legislative Council. During the 1920s, Peter's life was disrupted by the death of her mother and the illness of her father, which led to the selling of the family farm and relocation of her family to England. Peter returned to New Zealand with her sister after her family faced financial strain in the 1930s, and attended the Canterbury College School of Art at the suggestion of an aunt. At the college, she was greatly influenced by her tutor Francis Shurrock. She completed a diploma in painting in 1939.

While Peter was attending, the School of Arts had a focus on the 19th century, which did not appeal to her, and she found the library to be old and outdated. In contrast, Peter described the Christchurch art scene as "lively", and said that a travelling Canadian exhibition organised by Arthur Lismer "provided an absolute window into another way of doing things" and "had a profound influence on us all, on everybody."

During World War II, she joined the New Zealand Women's Land Army and also worked as an illustrator for the army's education unit.

In 1947, she started working for the Department of Education in their School Publication branch as an illustrator. In 1952, she married potter Roy Cowan.

== Career ==
From 1945 to 1951, Peter was based in Wellington, producing work while working as an illustrator. During this time, she showed works at the Architectural Centre Gallery, Centre Gallery 2, Centre Gallery 3, and the Helen Hitchings Gallery. Cowan and Peter moved to London in 1951, where she first studied at the Central School of Arts and Crafts, but then moved to the Hammersmith School of Art. This is where Peter was first introduced to lithography and pottery, which she says, "completely changed our whole approach to the arts".

Owing to Cowan's commitments to contracts with School Publications, they returned to Wellington, setting up a studio. The couple acquired a lithography press in England that they brought back to New Zealand with them. She continued to work in the medium and produced a substantial body of prints.

In 1968, along with her friend, painter Rita Angus, Peter made a series of works recording her protest over the razing of the Bolton Street Cemetery to extend Wellington's urban motorway. Peter wrote of the visits she and Angus made:

‘Conversation was kept to a minimum, we did not wish to attract attention to ourselves. But from time to time, a low voice would call, “Juliet, come and see …” and together we would examine a curious inscription, or a pattern of lichen on stone.

‘The summer of 1969 favoured our work. Sundays were usually fine, continuing into autumn. As the Engines of Destruction advanced up the cemetery, so we retreated.’

In 1999, Peter was included in The Eighties Show at The Dowse Art Museum, an exhibition of artists who were still active in their eighties, including Doreen Blumhardt, John Drawbridge, Roy Cowan, and Avis Higgs.

Peter also exhibited at the New Zealand Academy of Fine Arts, the Canterbury Society of Arts, The Group, and the Auckland Society of Arts. She died in Wellington in 2010, and her ashes were buried at Mākara Cemetery.

Her work was shown alongside Roy Cowan's in 2014 at The Dowse Art Museum in A Modest Modernism: Roy Cowan and Juliet Peter.

== Recognition ==
In the 2000 Queen's Birthday Honours, Peter was appointed a Companion of the New Zealand Order of Merit, for services to the arts.

== Collections ==
Peter's work is held in the collections of the Christchurch Art Gallery Te Puna o Waiwhetu, The Dowse Art Museum, and the Museum of New Zealand Te Papa Tongarewa.
