= Edward Sealy =

New Zealand surveyor, photographer, and farmer (1839–1903)

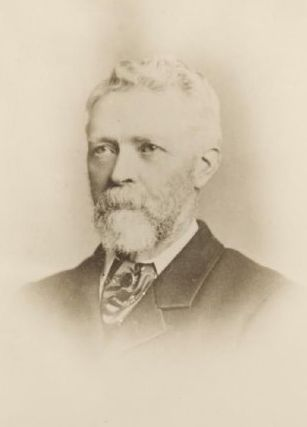
- Edward Sealy (mid-1870s)
- Born: Edward Percy Sealy; 23 August 1839; England
- Died: 30 October 1903 (aged 64) 'Southerndown', Timaru, New Zealand
- Occupations: Surveyor, farmer, explorer, entomologist
- Known for: Early Alpine photography "The Sealy case"
- Notable work: Collection of moths and butterflies
- Family: Henry Sealy (brother)

Edward Percy Sealy (23 August 1839 – 30 October 1903), also referred to as Edwin Sealy, was a New Zealand surveyor, photographer, explorer, farmer, and entomologist. Born into a wealthy English family, Edward and his elder brother Henry received a good education but were orphaned at a young age. The brothers emigrated to New Zealand and Edward was 19 when they arrived in 1859. They initially spent time with a relative in the Hawke's Bay Region from whom Edward learned photography. The brothers became surveyors in the Hawke's Bay and then worked for the Canterbury Provincial Council in this trade. They were involved in a very public scandal in 1876 when Edward beat a prominent member of parliament to some land that they were both interested in based on insider information that had been passed on by his brother. Both Sealy brothers were also farmers, with Henry engaging in much land speculation. They built family mansions next to each other in 1875 just outside of Timaru after they both married. His brother lost his house in the economic downturn that started in the late 1870s.

Edward Sealy explored in the Southern Alps, sometimes working alongside Julius von Haast. He took his camera into the mountains and was the first to take photos in those areas. When the New Zealand Alpine Club was founded in 1891, Sealy became one of the inaugural vice-presidents. Sealy was a collector of butterflies, moths and birds' eggs and his entomology collection was considered one of the most notable private collections in the world. The South Canterbury Museum in Timaru holds his entomology collection, and his photographs are held by the South Canterbury Museum and Canterbury Museum in Christchurch. Some geographic features in the Southern Alps and elsewhere are named for Sealy.

== Early life ==
Edward Sealy was born in England in 1839. Forebears had become rich in Barbados as plantation owners. His paternal grandparents died young and his father and aunt were brought up by relatives in England. Edward became an orphan when his father, the author Thomas Henry Sealy, died in 1848. Edward and his elder brother Henry (born 1838) were brought up by their aunt Maria Sealy. He received a classical education at Clifton College in Bristol. Edward was said to "stammer dreadfully".

== Surveying and farming ==
The brothers emigrated to New Zealand on the Clontarf, which arrived in Lyttelton on 5 January 1859. John Acland, a Canterbury high country runholder, was also on this ship. The brothers' intention was to proceed to Hawke's Bay but the ship lay in Lyttelton Port for a month as much of the crew had deserted. In mid-February, they set off from Wellington on the Emily Allison to meet up with their relative Henry Bowman Sealy, who lived at Patoka, inland from Napier. The family connection is uncertain, (Note: Holm (2005) states about the relative: "..., presumably an uncle, although he cannot be identified on the family tree, ...") but sources assume that he was their uncle. The brothers stayed with their relative and worked on his farm, learning the basics of farming. They also helped out land survey parties that worked in the district and during 1861, both of them worked as surveyors, Edward employed by the Hawke's Bay Provincial Council. In 1862, Edward surveyed for the Canterbury Provincial Council in Ashburton and North Canterbury.

Henry was in 1872 surveying between the Opuha and Orari rivers in South Canterbury. In 1874, the brothers won a tender for a survey contract further west and inland, with Edward working in the area near Burkes Pass. Edward retired as a contract surveyor in 1876 and was afterwards farming, managing properties with his brother. His brother got into financial difficulties in the depression that started in the late 1870s; by January 1881 he had to sell his home 'Heathcliffe'. From then on, Edward farmed on the land surrounding his homestead only. Sealy was a co-founder of the Farmers' Co-operative Association in Timaru and was the organisation's director.

=== "The Sealy case" ===
The Sealy brothers caused a great scandal when Edward Richardson applied for land on behalf of his father, The Honourable Edward Richardson. Richardson Jr was requesting land that Edward Sealy was also interested in; Henry was present when the request was made. Richardson Jr was told to come back the next morning when the land office opened again but by that time, Edward had purchased the land on the advice of his brother. This happened just prior to Henry finishing a contract survey of Saint Andrews township; this was completed on 9 May 1876. The Lyttelton Times reported about the affair for a whole month under the heading "The Sealy case" and stated that Henry Sealy's "engagement with the government has terminated", with descendants maintaining that his contract was not up for renewal anyway as the provincial government was not entering new contracts shortly before the disestablishment of the provincial government system.

== Photography and mountaineering ==
Sealy's uncle in Patoka is assumed to have been the first commercial portrait photographer in New Zealand, advertising his trade in 1848. It is assumed that Edward had learned photography from his uncle. In 1866, Sealy took his camera and other equipment to the upper Ashburton River and the Rangitata River, and the glaciers that feed these rivers. During the following year, he explored the whole length of the Mueller Glacier and took photos of Aoraki / Mount Cook from there. Dr Alfred Barker, a Christchurch-based doctor best known as a photographer, considered Sealy the best photographer in New Zealand at the time. Over Christmas and New Year 1867, the brothers caught up and over the space of a few days socialised with the Canterbury elite: Francis Jollie (a member of parliament) at Christmas Day, John Acland (by then a member of the Legislative Council) at Boxing Day, then on to Charles George Tripp (a large runholder) followed by Dr Ben Moorhouse (another large runholder). Moving on to Christchurch, the brothers then socialised with the family of Julius von Haast.

In 1869, Sealy helped von Haast with the exploration of the Tasman Glacier. By then, von Haast was suffering from rheumatism and the exploratory work was left to Sealy. Other glaciers explored that year were the Classen and Godley glaciers. On this latter trip, Sealy took his camera with him. His photos did not come out well and he decided to switch from dry to wet plate. In 1870, he went back to the Tasman Glacier and the Rangitata glaciers. He took photos of Mount Darwin and Hochstetter Dome; this is the first time that these mountains were seen from the east side. Sealy exhibited landscape photos at the first art exhibition in Christchurch in early 1870. In 1871, he gave 44 photo plates to the Canterbury Museum, where his friend von Haast was the curator. Some of Sealy's photos were exhibited as part of a map prepared by von Haast at the 1873 Vienna World's Fair, and Sealy won a silver medal for some of his photos. It is estimated that Sealy's gear that he carried onto the glaciers for photography weighed 60 pounds (27 kg).

When the New Zealand Alpine Club was founded in Christchurch in July 1891, Sealy was elected as one of the vice-presidents.

== Entomology ==
Sealy was an avid collector of moths, butterflies and birds' eggs. Insects in his collection from overseas were from India, Africa, China, New Guinea, Malaysia, Mexico, Ecuador, Brazil, Peru, and Guiana. In his obituary, the collection was described as "one of the finest private collections in the world". His collection of New Zealand bird eggs was possibly the most complete set at the time.

== Family ==
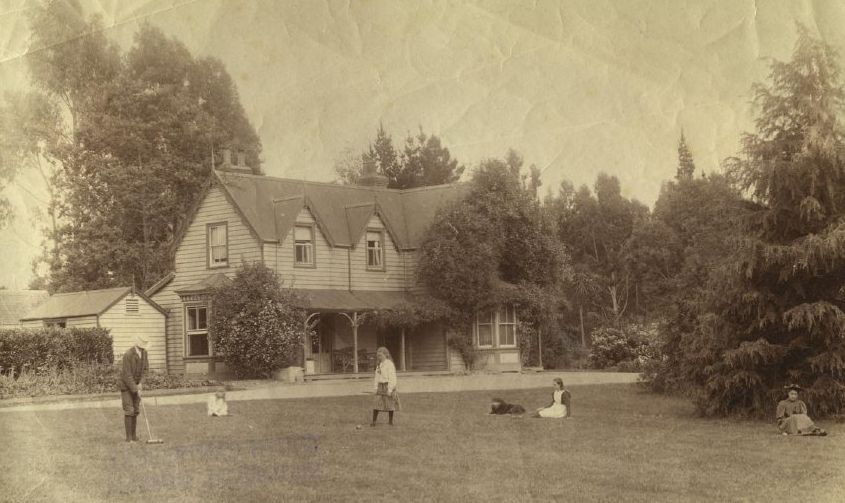
Southerndown in the 1890s

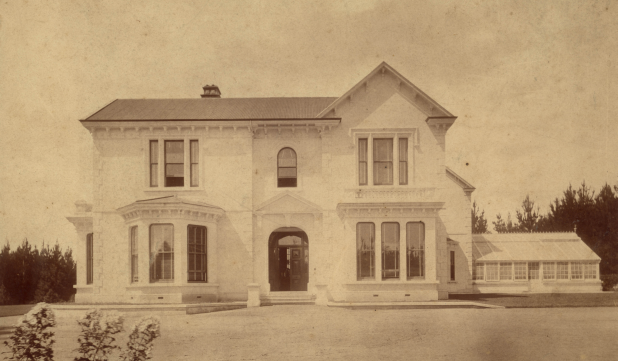
Heathcliffe in 1911, by then known by its current name Craighead

Sealy had become friendly with the Sanderson family. On 13 October 1873, he married Frances Sarah Sanderson (born 21 September 1855) at the family's homestead, Greta Peaks, near Scargill in the Hurunui District. The marriage was conducted by the bishop of Christchurch, Henry Harper. The honeymoon saw the newlyweds travel to Sydney and Melbourne, from where they returned in early January 1874. They returned to a newly built house 'Southerndown'; then located just outside Timaru in Highfield. Henry Sealy and his wife Emma were living with them until their adjacent house, 'Heathcliffe', was ready by November that year.

Sealy cut his leg with a sickle during the time of the Richardson scandal in 1876 and spent a month in bed. He never really recovered from the injury and it caused him ongoing trouble. Many years later, he developed a debilitating paralysis. He died at his home, "Southerndown", on 30 October 1903 aged 64, and was buried at Timaru Cemetery. He was survived by his wife, five daughters and one son. One daughter had died before him. In its obituary, The Timaru Herald described his exploration in the Southern Alps thus:

The courage, determination and coolness required to pack a heavy photographic apparatus over the glaciers and make good use of it, in the days before Swiss guides, ropes and ice-axes were thought of in New Zealand, mark a man of the sterling stamp required for successful pioneering.

— The Timaru Herald staff writer, Edward Sealy obituary

His wife died at 'Southerndown' on 4 January 1912 aged 56. Within a fortnight of her death, 'Southerndown' was offered for sale. By April 1913, the house had been purchased by A. J. McLean, who renamed it Ardgour.

His eldest child, Violet (1875–1926), married Charles James Peter on 21 December 1898 at St Mary's Church in Timaru. He was the son of the late Hon William Spence Peter, a member of the Legislative Council. Their daughter, Juliet Peter, became a notable potter. Sealy's second eldest child, Frances Helen Mary (1876–1920), married John Patrick Peter, another son of the Hon W. S. Peter. His fifth child, Ruth Verity (1883–1960), married William Percy D'Ewes Barker. Her husband was the grandson of Dr Alfred Barker, the early Christchurch photographer noted above. The Barkers had a daughter, Audrey, who died in early 1935 aged 21.

== Commemoration ==
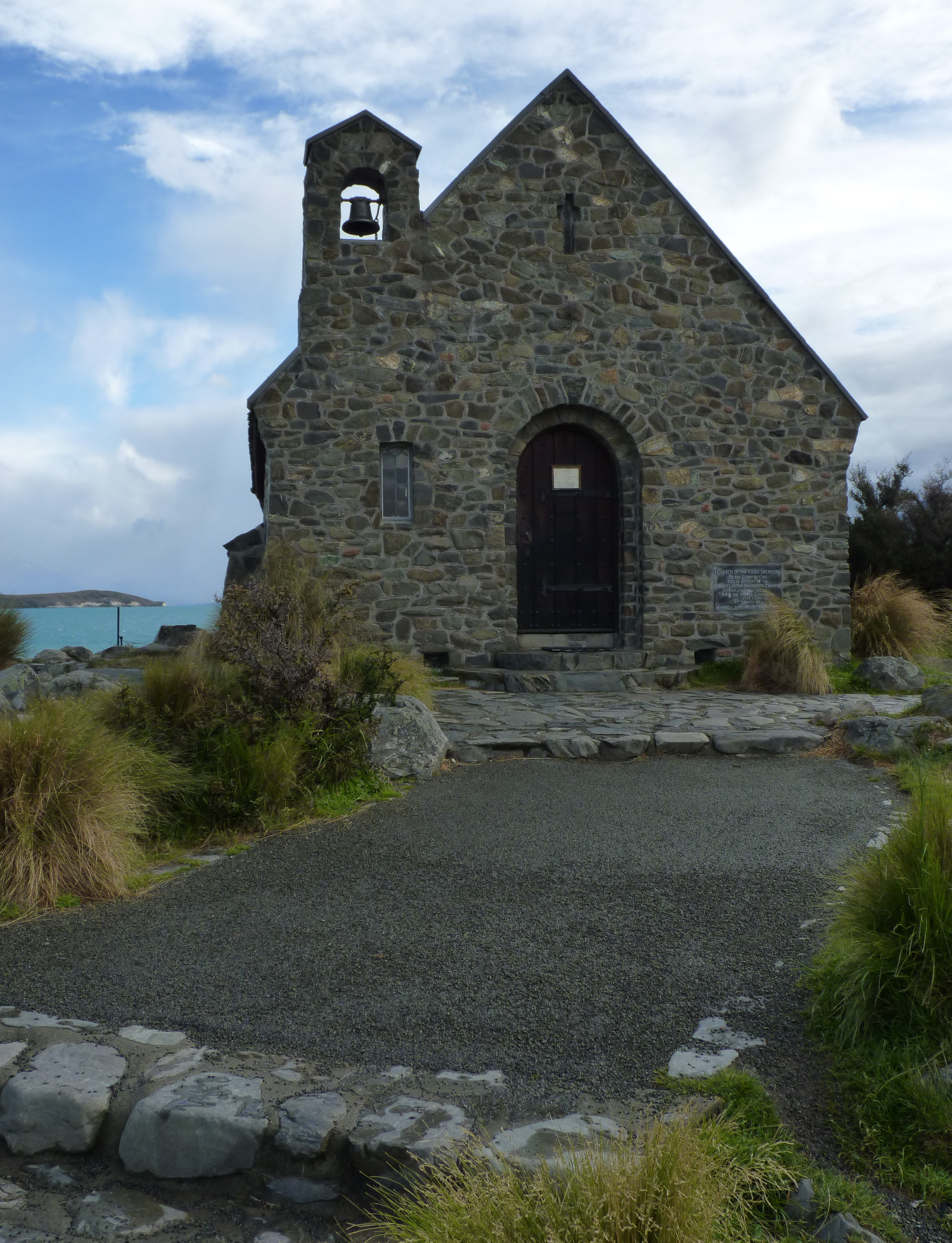
Church of the Good Shepherd at Lake Tekapo, with the bell commemorating Sealy and one of his granddaughters

Sealy's collections of moths, butterflies, and birds' eggs are held by the South Canterbury Museum in Timaru. Sealy owned a first edition of Walter Buller's book A History of the Birds of New Zealand and amended it with his own notes and drawings of bird eggs. The South Canterbury Museum purchased Sealy's book in 2008 to add it to their collection. Many of his photographs are held by the South Canterbury Museum and Canterbury Museum in Christchurch. Von Haast named a number of geographic features in the Southern Alps for him, including Mount Sealy and the Sealy Tarns in the Sealy Range. Sealy Glacier, which feeds Sealy Stream, located in South Westland, are probably also named for Sealy. Sealy Pass above the Godley Glacier commemorates Sealy's 1869 exploration of the glaciers.

The driveway to their house 'Southerndown' in the suburb of Highfield is now known as Sealy Street. His brother's house, which was accessed via the same driveway, still stands, is known as 'Craighead', and has given its name to the girls' school, Craighead Diocesan School, that is now occupying the land.

When his granddaughter Audrey Barker died in February 1935, the Church of the Good Shepherd at Lake Tekapo was under construction. The Barker and Sealy families donated the bell for the church, commemorating both Audrey Barker and Sealy.
