= Opuha =

Coordinates: 44°09′35″S 171°00′20″E

Opuha is a small rural district located in the Timaru District, New Zealand. It is located to the northwest of Pleasant Point and southeast of Fairlie. The Opuha Dam is also located within the district.
