= Clontarf =

Clontarf may refer to:

== Placenames ==
=== Australia ===
- Clontarf, New South Wales
- Clontarf, Queensland, a suburb of the Moreton Bay Region
- Clontarf, Queensland (Toowoomba Region), a locality in the Toowoomba Region

=== Ireland ===
- Clontarf, Dublin

=== United States ===
- Clontarf, Minnesota

== Other ==
- Battle of Clontarf, 1014
- Clontarf (ship), New Zealand immigration ship of 1858–60
- Clontarf (whiskey), an Irish brand
- Clontarf FC, a rugby union club based in Clontarf, Dublin
- Clontarf Foundation, an Australian non-profit educational foundation for indigenous students
- Clontarf Aboriginal College, the current name of a former orphanage in the Perth suburb of Waterford in Western Australia.
