= Jessie Sarah Wright =

New Zealand artist

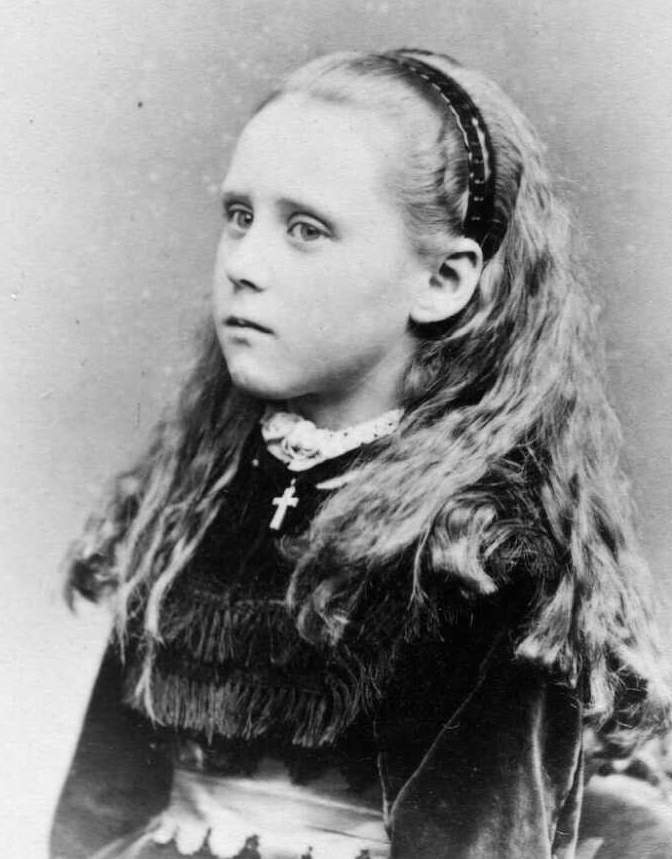
- c. 1860s
- Born: Jessie Sarah Barraud; 3 August 1863; Wellington, New Zealand
- Died: df=y}} Wellington, New Zealand
- Resting place: Bolton Street Memorial Park
- Relatives: Charles Decimus Barraud (father); Sarah Maria Barraud (mother)

Jessie Sarah Wright (née Barraud; 3 August 1863 – 30 May 1892) was a Wellington-based New Zealand artist who exhibited at the New Zealand Academy of Fine Arts.

== Biography ==
Jessie Sarah Wright was born in Wellington on 3 August 1863, the third daughter of Charles Decimus Barraud, artist and pharmacist, and Sarah Barraud. From 1875 to 1877, she, with some of her family, visited England, and the letters that she wrote back to New Zealand are held in Alexander Turnbull Library.

In 1881, she exhibited at the Industrial Exhibition, and was awarded third place for the crayon drawing Nuggets from Coombe Hay. In 1883 and 1884 she exhibited at the New Zealand Academy of Fine Arts, of which her father was a principal founder and later president. In 1883, she exhibited a work called Scarborough, of which a critic wrote:

"Scarborough," (No. 11) by Miss J. Barraud, is a picture that we cannot make up our minds about. There is a boldness of coloring that belongs to no school that we are acquainted with, and yet is not inharmonious, and the picture is certainly characteristic of the Yorkshire coast. We want to have another look at it; it is either very feeble or very good; it is certainly out of the common.

On 4 May 1886, she married George Robert Nicol Wright at St Paul's Cathedral. They lived on The Terrace, Wellington, next door to the Barraud family home and had three children, Eric, Charles and Jessie.

She died in Wellington on 30 May 1892 aged 28 and was buried in Barraud family plot in Bolton Street Memorial Park, Wellington.
