= Evelyn Sturt =

Evelyn Pitfield Shirley Sturt
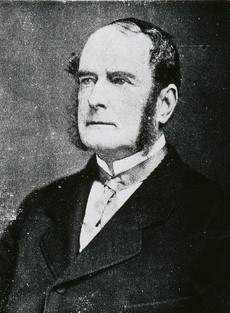
- Born: 25 October 1815; Dorset, England
- Died: 10 February 1885 (aged 69) at sea
- Occupations: Police magistrate, commissioner of crown lands, police office, overlander, grazier
- Spouse: Mary Frances Grylls
- Parent(s): Thomas Lenox Napier Sturt & Jeannette, née Wilson

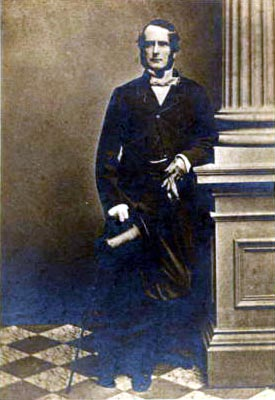

Evelyn Pitfield Shirley Sturt (25 October 1815 – 10 February 1885) was born in Dorset, England. He was the youngest son of Thomas Lenox Napier Sturt, a puisne judge in Bengal for the British East India Company, and Jeanette or Jeannette, née Wilson. One of his older brothers was the Australian explorer Charles Sturt.

Evelyn arrived in Australia at the age of 20, and by 21 he was appointed the Commissioner of Crown Lands for all of the new colony. Two years later, he resigned and then overlanded sheep and cattle from Bathurst to Adelaide to take up a large parcel of land as a grazier.

Between 1849 and 1878, Sturt served as Police Magistrate and Superintendent of Police in Melbourne.

== Early life ==
Evelyn was educated at the Sandhurst Military College, and in 1836, at the young age of twenty, he migrated to New South Wales, travelling on the Hooghly, a ship of 466 tons which had previously been used as a convict transport vessel and was under the command of George Bayly at that time. Sturt arrived in Sydney on 12 October that year.

Making an impression on the authorities, Evelyn was appointed, only 4 months after his arrival, as the Commissioner of Crown lands and was based in Yass from 20 February 1837. Being only 21 years of age he was sometimes referred to as 'the boy commissioner'.

== Sheep and cattle farming ==
Sturt resigned his post as Commissioner of Crown Lands in 1839 and decided to take sheep and cattle overland from Bathurst to Adelaide, at the time a massive distance of 1200 km. His partners in that successful venture were Charles Campbell, James Stein, and a Mr Hardy. After occupying country at Willunga, South Australia in the Mount Lofty Ranges, he took up Compton station in the Mount Gambier district in 1844.

Again Evelyn was favoured by the authorities when he was granted ownership of the land in the area ahead of the Henty brothers who, despite also spending five years from 1839 to 1844 dealing with resistance from the Buandig (or Buandik) people, were the original Aboriginal inhabitants of the area., were not granted the land ahead of Evelyn. Although he continued to encounter many difficulties, and left to hold a new position as Police Magistrate in 1849, he did not dispose of the lands until 1853.

In 1853, Sturt wrote about the River Murray area, which his explorer brother Charles Sturt had named in 1830: "As for the Murray ever becoming an agricultural country, the notion is absurd ... there is hardly a settler on the Lower Murray who can luxuriate in a vegetable."

== Duties with the Melbourne Police ==
While still at Mount Gambier, South Australia, Evelyn was offered and accepted an appointment as the Police Magistrate in Melbourne in 1849.

In the following year he accepted the position of superintendent of the Melbourne Police, and attempted to reconcile what he described as the great inefficiency of the District (Melbourne and County of Bourke) Police Force arising from their scattered and isolated stations and a lack of constables of police.

Sturt found his troubles to be influenced by various gold rushes, which took a toll on police numbers – indeed he reported in December 1851 that he had lost forty of his fifty staff to resignation. In early 1853, Sir William Mitchell assumed Sturt's position of Superintendent of police and Evelyn was reappointed as magistrate for Melbourne, serving for the next twenty-five years. It appears that he was not afraid of brandishing his authority and in 1854 when he was appointed to the commission of inquiry into the Bentley hotel affair at Ballarat – seen by many to be a precursor to the Eureka Stockade – he recommended dismissal of some corrupt government officers and compensation to some of those who had suffered losses.

Evelyn also was appointed as a member of the royal commissions in 1861 that reported on the disastrous Burke and Wills expedition.

In 1869, he took a brief leave of absence from his position and returned to England (with his wife) and was present at the death of his brother Charles Sturt who had returned to live in England some 18 years earlier. Evelyn returned to his position but was dismissed in the Black Wednesday retrenchments of January 1878, and then accepting a pension, he left with his wife for England.

== Personal life ==
Evelyn remained unmarried until 36, but then in 1852 he married Mary Frances, who was a daughter of the Church of England Reverend J. C. Grylls. They had no children, and later lived in Brighton, Victoria.

== Death ==
In 1885, when returning to Victoria from another trip to England aboard the Perkin, Evelyn contracted a severe case of bronchitis. He died, aged 69, on 10 February 1885, the day before reaching the Egyptian city of Port Said. Evelyn's body was returned to England for burial.

Evelyn County, New South Wales and Sturt Street, Ballarat, Victoria are named in his honour.

== Memoria ==
Evelyn Creek, New South Wales, was named after Sturt, by his explorer brother, Charles Sturt.

== See also ==
- Mount Gambier, South Australia
- Eureka Stockade
- Evelyn County, New South Wales
- Burke and Wills

== Bibliography ==
- Boldrewood, R., Old Melbourne Memories, 2nd edn, Macmillan, London, 1896.
- Bride, T. F. (ed.), Letters from Victorian Pioneers, Melbourne, 1898.
- Fetherstonhaugh, C., After Many Days, Sydney, 1918.
- Gross, A., Sturt, Evelyn Pitfield Shirley (1816–1885), Australian Dictionary of Biography, Volume 6, 1976.
- Sturt, N. G., Life of Charles Sturt, London, 1895.
