= William Spence Peter =

New Zealand politician and pastoralist

William Spence Peter (1818 – 23 May 1891) was a pioneer pastoralist of South Australia and New Zealand, and a member of the New Zealand Legislative Council from 1868 to 1891.

== Early life and arrival in Australia ==
Peter was born in Perthshire, Scotland, in 1818. His surname has been frequently misspelt as Peters, which sometimes led to confusion, but he was adamant it was Peter. In partnership with his brother (or cousin) Edward Peter, he arrived aged 19 at Adelaide, South Australia in January 1839 aboard the Indus.

Promptly making their way to New South Wales by sea, the Messrs. Peter there purchased 12,500 sheep from the celebrated flocks of Icely & Co. and then successfully overlanded these from Bathurst to Adelaide in June 1840. Unlike some overlanders, they had no conflict with Aboriginal people along the route, which they were proud of. They were also proud that their flocks, mostly kept on and around the River Light, were scab free.

== Mid-North of South Australia ==
The partners then took up pastoralist occupation licences at various locations in the lower Mid North, turning their flocks out onto these unfenced runs under the care of wandering shepherds. Their first head station, established in 1840, was on the Light River just east of present-day Marrabel. Around this time Peters Hill, a prominent peak on their runs, southwest of Marrabel, was named. W.S. Peter is listed in a government return of 1841 as the fifth largest sheep holder in the Province, the first being the South Australian Company.

One of the drovers assisting W.S. Peter to overland livestock from New South Wales was a bachelor named William Roach. He was no stranger to the courts. Roach, aged about 40, was appointed by W.S. Peter as store-keeper at his station on the River Light. In August 1841, near the River Light, Roach encountered an Aboriginal man named Tudnurtya/Worta who had apparently slaughtered one of W.S. Peter's calves. A confrontation resulted in which Roach shot the Aboriginal man dead. Roach's initial charge of murder was later downgraded to manslaughter and he was eventually dismissed without penalty. By then Roach had moved on to be employed as stock-keeper by C.J.F. Campbell at his Hill River run, near Clare. Again there were confrontations with Aboriginals allegedly killing and stealing cattle. In February 1845 Roach was visiting his employer Campbell at his Adelaide residence when he fell from his horse while intoxicated and was killed.

W.S. Peter held extensive occupation licences during the 1840s, setting up many outstations in the Mid-North for his flocks. Those outstations included the upper reaches of the Light River and the subsequent site of the Burra copper mine. Peter had shepherd huts at Burra as early as 1842. In 1844 he had 10,000 sheep depastured on a station known as Emu Lodge, or Emu Springs, with headquarters at Black Springs on the River Gilbert in County Light. Peter then established his Gum Creek Station near Hanson, about 16 km southwest of Burra, being regarded as a prominent pioneer and citizen of the Manoora region. The fame and reputation of his Gum Creek Station was later imitated by the naming of a pastoral property in the Flinders Ranges.

== Eyre Peninsula ==
In 1842 he was one of the four pastoralists in a volunteer party led by James Collins Hawker that went, along with a police party led by Inspector Tolmer, in search of Charles Christian Dutton, an ill-fated pastoralist of the Port Lincoln district. Resulting from this experience, in 1846 in partnership with George and Alex Elder, founders of Elders Limited, he established a sheep run named Warrow Station at Coulta near Port Lincoln. Having moved there, he was appointed a justice and magistrate for that district. In that role he conducted the coronial inquest into the murder of neighbouring pastoralist James Rigby Beevor.

He married in 1856 to Jane Seymour, a daughter of pastoralist Henry Seymour of Killanoola station near Naracoorte. Jane's elder sister Elizabeth had married in 1845 to George Charles Hawker of Bungaree and Anama Stations, to whom W.S. Peter was now brother in law. After marriage he returned to his Gum Creek run, at the same time going into partnership with the Elder brothers in pioneering the Booleroo run, near present Booleroo Centre.

By 1861 the combined Gum Creek and Booleroo runs comprised an area of 896 square miles and were carrying 60,500 sheep. On 28 February 1861 both runs, plus 27,700 sheep, were profitably auctioned when W.S. Peter decided to settle in the Canterbury region of New Zealand as a stud sheep breeder. He and his family departed from Adelaide in June 1861 aboard the Oscar.

== The Moonta Mine leases ==
A controversial incident took place on 25 May 1861, a few weeks before their departure. W.S. Peter's stock and station agents were Elder, Stirling & Co. The firm were also agents for Walter Hughes, who just a few months earlier had been the purchaser of W.S. Peter's Gum Creek Station. Hughes also had a pastoral run at Wallaroo, where in December 1859 a shepherd discovered copper ore, leading to the establishment of Wallaroo Mines. When another shepherd made a similar discovery in May 1861 several rival claimants rushed to make their applications but at first were uncertain as to the exact locality. This was to become the fabulously rich mines at Moonta. In order to divert attention and prevent a rush, Elders used W.S. Peter's name on the original claim for these mineral leases, later being transferred by him to Hughes and his Company. The losing syndicate cried foul on this subterfuge, leading to a State Select Committee, chaired by G.S. Kingston, leading to court action which was eventually settled out of court.

== New Zealand ==
In the meantime Peter had arrived at Canterbury, settling at Anama, near Ashburton, where he bred merinos. The name Anama was derived from his South Australian connection. The Peter Range, a mountain range at Canterbury, bears his name.

A successful sheep-farmer, W.S. Peter was an equally successful politician, being appointed on 23 June 1868 to represent the Canterbury region on the Legislative Council; he remained a member until his death.

He died on 23 May 1891 at Ashburton Hospital after a short illness. His son, Charles James Peter, married Violet Sealy on 21 December 1898 at St Mary's Church in Timaru. She was the eldest child of the surveyor, photographer, explorer, farmer, and entomologist Edward Sealy. Their daughter, Juliet Peter, became a notable potter.
