= Sarah Barraud =

New Zealand homemaker and letter-writer

- Barraud, c. 1860s
- Born: Sarah Maria Style c. 1823
- Died: 8 March 1895 (aged 71–72)
- Occupations: Homemaker; letter writer
- Spouse: Charles Decimus Barraud (m. 1849)
- Children: 9, including Jessie Sarah Wright

Sarah Maria Barraud (c.1823 – 8 March 1895) was a New Zealand homemaker and letter-writer. Born in England, she emigrated with her husband to New Zealand in 1849, and wrote detailed letters back to her family about their domestic life.

== Biography ==
Sarah Maria Style was born in Wraysbury, Buckinghamshire, England, in about 1823, to farmer Robert Style and his wife Elizabeth Haines. She was the seventh of her parents' nine children, and before her marriage she worked as a schoolteacher. She married pharmacist Charles Decimus Barraud on 17 March 1849 at St Lawrence's Church, Southampton, and they emigrated to New Zealand together on the Pilgrim in May. The marriage produced six sons and three daughters, including Jessie Sarah Wright.

After arriving in New Zealand, Barraud and her husband lived at a cottage in Karori owned by her husband's cousin, judge Henry Samuel Chapman, while a larger house on The Terrace was being built. Their eldest child was born at the cottage. In around 1851 they moved to the house on the Terrace, Fernglen, where their remaining eight children were born.

Barraud wrote detailed letters to her family back in England about life in New Zealand. She raised and taught the children, planted and looked after the garden at Fernglen and undertook other household chores such as cooking and cleaning. Her husband had established a pharmacy on Lambton Quay and was often away on painting and sketching trips to other parts of New Zealand. She acted as hostess to notable people like Hōniana Te Puni-kōkopu and George Grey, and was part of the ladies' circle at the Wellington Cathedral of St Paul.

Barraud travelled to England in 1875 with her husband and two of her daughters, returning to New Zealand in 1877. On this trip they spent time with family as well as sightseeing in London. Barraud died in Wellington on 8 March 1895 and was buried at Bolton Street Cemetery.
