= Eileen Constance Cowan =

New Zealand illustrator, photographer and painter

- Born: Eileen Constance Stowell; June 13, 1892; Hāwera
- Died: June 2, 1968 (aged 75)
- Resting place: Mākara Cemetery, Wellington, New Zealand
- Spouse: James Cowan
- Children: John Cowan, Roy Cowan

Eileen Constance Cowan (née Stowell; 1892–1968) was a New Zealand illustrator and painter.

== Biography ==
Eileen Constance Stowell was born on 13 June 1892 to Henry Matthew Stowell (Hāre Hongi), interpreter and geologist, and Mary Robson of Te Āti Awa. On 8 September 1913, Stowell married James Cowan, a New Zealand writer and historian, following his first wife's, Eunice Cowan, death in 1909. They had two sons, John and Roy.

She illustrated and took photographs for several of her husband's publications. She also produced watercolour paintings.

The National Library of New Zealand, which holds the Cowan family papers, has several of her drawings, paintings and photographs. These include:

- A copy of Ranolf and Amohia by Alfred Domett that Cowan had illustrated extensively.
- Maori canoes on Lake Rotomahana, with Tarawera in eruption, 1886, illustrated in 1915
- Hongi's Track, Lake Rotoiti, illustrated in 1915?

Cowan died on 2 June 1968, and was buried in Mākara Cemetery, Wellington.
