= MTG Hawke's Bay =

Coordinates: 39.4887°S 176.9189°E

Kahukura Hawke's Bay Museum
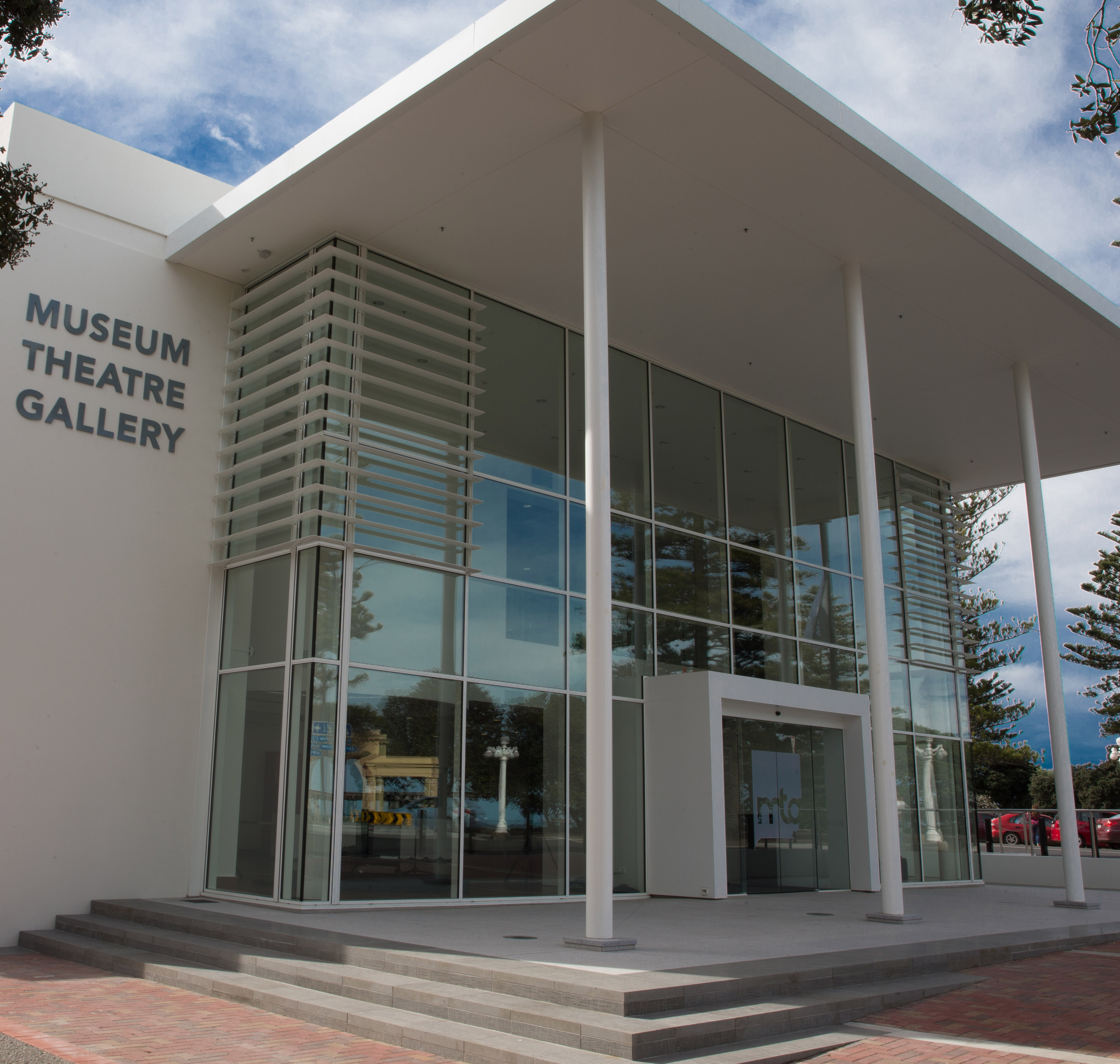
- The main entrance in September 2013
- Former names: MTG Hawke's Bay; Hawke's Bay Museum & Art Gallery
- Established: 1865
- Location: Napier, New Zealand
- Type: Museum, theatre and art gallery
- Founders: William Colenso, Henry Hill and Augustus Hamilton
- Director: Laura Vodanovich
- Website: www.hawkesbaymuseum.com

Kahukura Hawke's Bay Museum (formerly MTG Hawke's Bay) is a museum, theatre and art gallery (hence the former name MTG) in Napier, New Zealand. It occupies three buildings that were redeveloped in 2013.

== History ==
The first building on the museum site was constructed in 1865 as an athenaeum (library) with the purpose of providing a space for cultural and learning opportunities for Hawke's Bay residents. The Hawke's Bay Philosophical and Mechanic's Institute was based in the building in the early 19th century and contributed ideas on art and science to the province. Individuals behind these early institutions were William Colenso, Henry Hill and Augustus Hamilton.

The 1931 Hawke's Bay earthquake considerably damaged the institutes' collections but the building was one of few in central Napier to remain standing. The earthquake underscored Hawke's Bay's need for a purpose-built art gallery and museum for the safekeeping of the region's treasures. In 1936 a new building was constructed with funds raised from the Hawke's Bay community. It was designed by architect Louis Hay. Leonard Bestall was appointed honorary director to the newly built Hawke's Bay Art Gallery and Museum. A series of generous bequests enriched the museum's collection and also provided the funds to purchase the artwork Renaissance by Roland Hipkins.

After Bestall's death in 1959 the museum was run by a number of directors, each one adding their own personal passions to the collection and museum buildings. James Munro was appointed director in 1959 and concentrated on building a strong collection of decorative art objects. His dedication for a broader role for the museum led to the construction of the Century Theatre in 1977. The theatre was named for the centenary of the city of Napier and it was designed by modernist Guy Natusch and acted as a concert chamber. In 1980 Robert McGregor was appointed director of the Hawke's Bay museum and undertook the task of redeveloping the collection storage areas. In 1984 taonga from the museum's collection were included in the Te Māori exhibition, which toured American museums.

In 2006 the Napier City Council took over management of Hawke's Bay Museum. Douglas Lloyd Jenkins was appointed director and the name of the institution changed to Hawke's Bay Museum & Art Gallery. The Hawke's Bay Museums Trust was re-formed to become a trust that holds the museum's collections for the benefit of the community. In July 2010 the Hawke's Bay Museum & Art Gallery closed to undertake a three-year redevelopment project. The completed MTG Hawke's Bay facility opened on 21 September 2013 and incorporates the two older buildings on the site with a new wing designed by architect Richard Daniels. The building won two architectural awards in the annual New Zealand Architecture awards, in the categories Public Architecture and Heritage for the Gisborne and Hawke's Bay region.

When Hawke's Bay Museum opened a new storage, research and archive building in Hastings in 2026, the new facility was named Amokura Hawke's Bay Museum, and MTG was renamed Kahukura Hawke's Bay Museum.

== Collections ==
The museum's collection is held in trust by the Hawke's Bay Museums Trust, Ruawharo Tā-ū-rangi. The fine arts collection includes works by national figures such as Rita Angus, Roland Hipkins, Jenny Campbell, Avis Higgs, Frank Carpay, Joan Trollope and Walter Bowring. The museum also has significant historical artifacts including archive material, natural history specimens, social history artifacts, taonga Māori objects, costume and textiles, and a World Cultures collection.
