= St Mary's Church, Timaru =

Church in Timaru, New Zealand

St Mary's Church
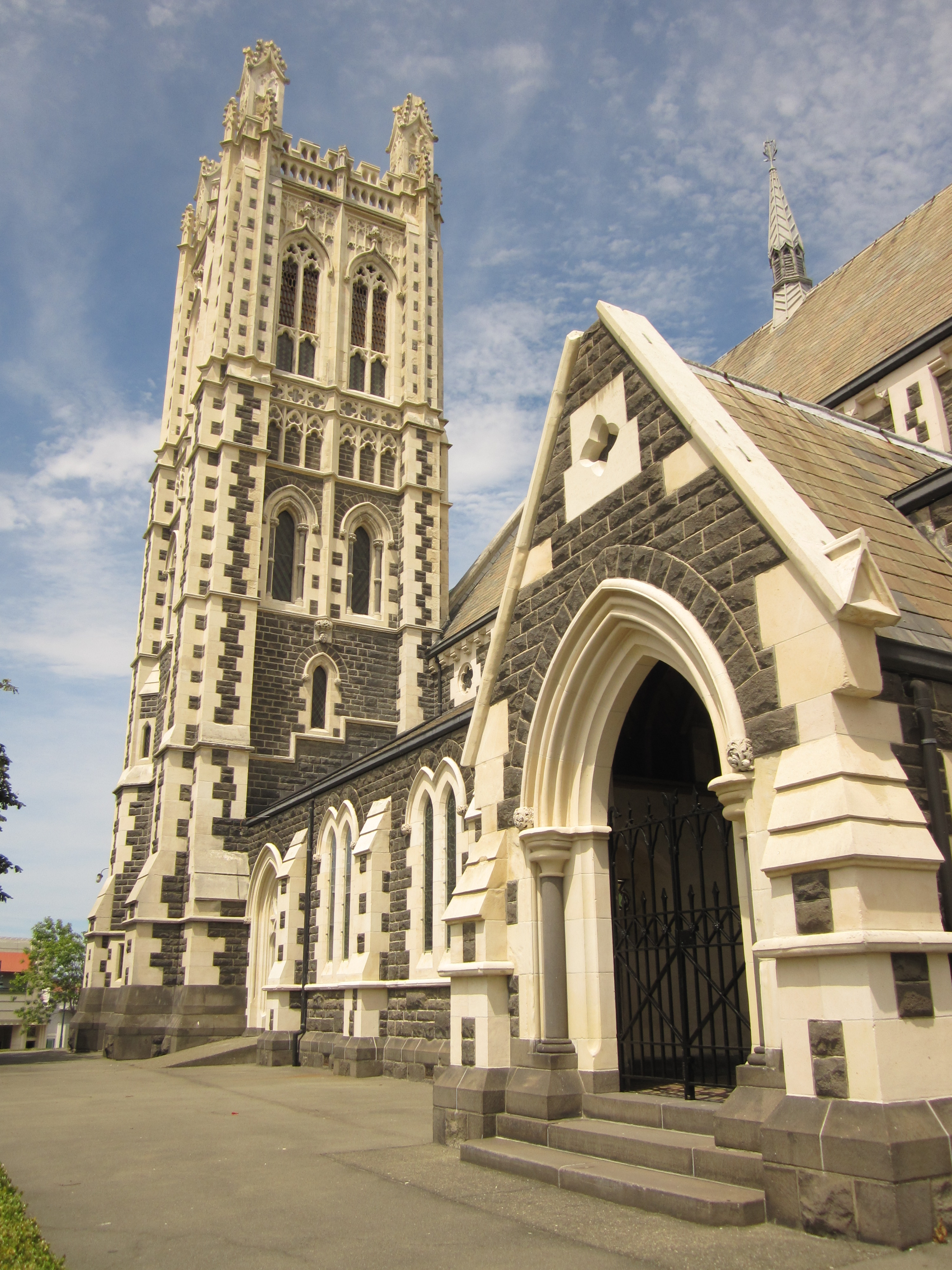
- St Mary's Church with its distinctive tower
- St Mary's Church
- 44°23′47″S 171°15′04″E
- Address: 22A Church Street, Timaru, Canterbury, South Island
- Country: New Zealand
- Denomination: Anglican
- Website: stmarystimaru.co.nz

History
- Status: Church
- Founded: 9 September 1880
- Founders: Bishop Henry Harper; Rev. Henry Jacobs
- Consecrated: 26 August 1886

Architecture
- Functional status: Active
- Architects: William Armson; Collins and Harman
- Architectural type: Church
- Style: Gothic Revival
- Years built: 1880, 1886, and 1909
- Construction cost: NZ£10,000

Specifications
- Materials: Bluestone

Administration
- Province: Anglican Church in Aotearoa, New Zealand and Polynesia
- Diocese: Christchurch
- Parish: Timaru

Clergy
- Vicar: Rev. Ben Randall

Heritage New Zealand – Category 1
- Official name: St Mary's Church (Anglican)
- Designated: 4 April 1985
- Reference no.: 328

St Mary's Church is a heritage-listed Anglican church located in Timaru, in the Canterbury region on the South Island of New Zealand. One of the defining landmarks in Timaru, the present church was built in three stages in 1880, consecrated in 1886, with the distinct tower added in 1910.

== History ==
The land where St Mary's Church stands was sold to the Anglican diocese by brothers William Barnard Rhodes, Robert Heaton Rhodes, and George Rhodes. The grounds of the Anglican church were consecrated by bishop Henry Harper in 1861. On 9 September 1880, Henry Jacobs, the Dean of Christchurch, laid the foundation stone for a replacement church, designed by William Armson in Gothic Revival style. Jacobs stood in for Harper who was ill. Henry William Harper, Harper's son, was the Archdeacon of Timaru at the time.

The contract for the construction of the first stage was undertaken by Mr McGill. The contract for the second stage was let, in early 1881, to R. B. Sibly. The quality of Sibly's work was found wanting by an arbitration court and he cancelled his contract. Re-tendering the second stage contract was delayed by a lengthy illness of Armson. Francis John Wilson was the architect for the parsonage that was tendered in July 1881. Soon after, the second part of the church construction contract was let to P. Clayton. Armson died in 1883. It took more than three further years before the church was consecrated by Bishop Harper on 26 August 1886. The 1880s church had cost NZ£10,000, the adjacent school NZ£1,950, and the vicarage NZ£2,200. In a storm on 9 September 1889, the belfry was blown over and the bell cracked, which thus had to be recast.

The architectural firm of Collins and Harman provided an alternate design for the square tower. By 1901, chancel, vestries, tower, spire and bells were yet to be added. Plans for the completion of the church were presented to the public in 1906 for fundraising purposes. The church expansion required the removal of the original 1860s church. The foundation stone for the church completion was laid on 14 July 1907 by Archdeacon Harper. The builder for the work was Samuel McBride. Walter Panton from Timaru acted as the supervising architect for Collins and Harman.

The distinct tower makes the church a landmark in Timaru. On 4 April 1985, St Mary's was registered by the New Zealand Historic Places Trust as a Category I building, with registration number 328.

St Mary's Church is located on the corner of Church and Sophia streets.

In 2011, during the Christchurch earthquake, one of the tower's four pinnacles fell down, prompting the removal of the other three for safety reasons. All four pinnacles were restored in 2023 after a long period of repairs and restoration.

== Notable weddings ==
- 17 July 1873: Henry Sealy married Emma Askin
- 21 December 1898: Violet Sealy (daughter of Edward Sealy) married Charles James Peter (son of William Spence Peter)
- 15 July 1926: Pat Ward (All Black #335) married Jessie Macpherson
