= Wellington Harbour Board Wharf Office Building =

Historic building in Wellington, New Zealand

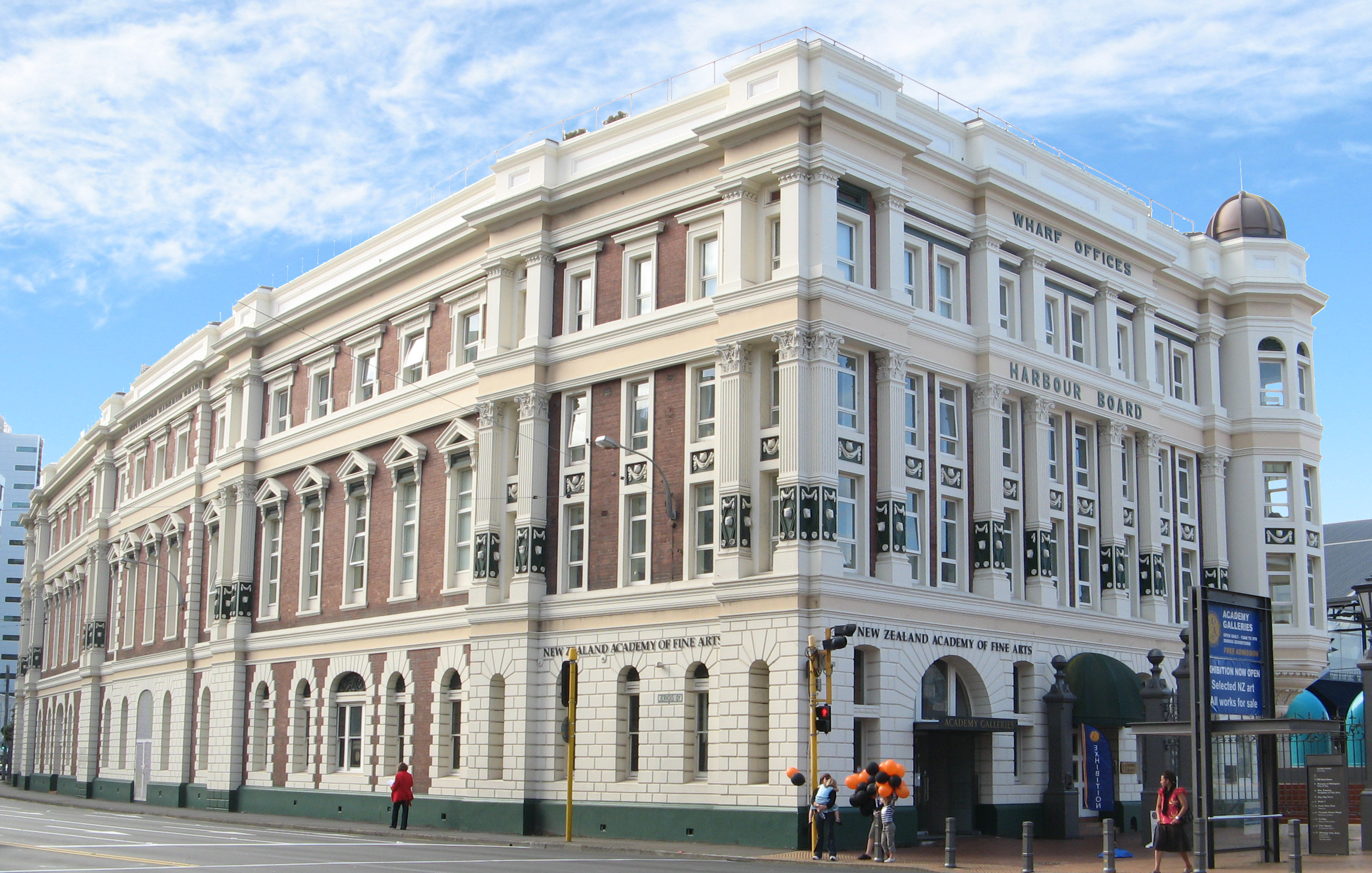
- Interactive map of the Wellington Harbour Board Wharf Office Building area

General information
- Architectural style: Italianate Palazzo
- Location: Jervois Quay, Wellington, New Zealand
- Coordinates: 41.284705°S 174.777954°E

Design and construction
- Architect: Frederick de Jersey Clere

Heritage New Zealand – Category 1
- Designated: 27 July 1988
- Reference no.: 1446

Wellington Harbour Board Wharf Office Building (also known as Shed 7) is a historic building on Jervois Quay erected by the Wellington Harbour Board in Wellington, New Zealand.

The building, is classified as a Category 1 Historic Place (places of "special or outstanding historical or cultural heritage significance or value") by Heritage New Zealand. The building currently houses the New Zealand Academy of Fine Arts.
