= Charles James Fox Campbell =

Australian grazier

Personal details
- Born: 1811 Kingsborough, Isle of Skye
- Died: 5 March 1859 North West Bend Station, Morgan, South Australia
- Spouse: Martha Levi

Charles James Fox Campbell was a grazier and early settler of Adelaide, South Australia, whose name is commemorated in the Adelaide suburb of Campbelltown, South Australia and the municipality, the City of Campbelltown, South Australia.

== Early life ==
Charles James Fox Campbell was born in 1811 at Kingsborough House, Isle of Skye. The son of John and Annabelle Campbell, he was born into a prominent family, the Campbell baronets of Glenorchy (1625). In 1821 his family migrated to New South Wales in the chartered ship Lusitania. His father, Colonel John Campbell, J.P.,(1770-1827), who was related by marriage to Governor Lachlan Macquarie, then established Bungarribee estate on the road between Sydney and Parramatta. Bungarribee is now a Sydney suburb and in 2000 the historic Bungarribee Homestead site was listed on the heritage register. On this estate his family engaged in breeding and raising livestock, particularly horses for the East India Company and the British Army in India.

Orphaned at 16, he devoted himself to the field of agriculture, particularly pastoralism, after finishing his education. In about 1836 in partnership with his brother, Dalmahoy Campbell, he established Dundullimal Homestead near Dubbo. Dalmahoy Campbell later moved to Melbourne, where in 1850 he was influential in the establishment of Australian rules football.

== Overlanding ==
In 1838 Charles Campbell participated in the first overland cattle expedition to South Australia, led by Joseph Hawdon. In 1839 he joined with several other young gentlemen, namely Evelyn Sturt, James Stein, and William Hardy of Yass to overland 5,000 sheep from Bathurst to Adelaide. He then partnered with Stein during 1839–40 in two further overland livestock expeditions, both being profitable. In 1842, in connection with Henry Strong Price, he established the first sheep and cattle run on the Hill River, near Clare, which was managed by a resident stock keeper, William Roach. This run, soon taken up by William Robinson, was later known as the Hill River Station (or Hill River Estate) and became one of the great pastoral estates of South Australia. Roach had been formerly employed by W.S. Peter on his Light River run, where in September 1841 he had allegedly murdered an Aboriginal. Having been acquitted, Roach was employed by Campbell as his stock-keeper at Hill River. Roach's confrontations with Aboriginals continued there, until in February 1845 at Campbell's Adelaide home he was killed through falling from a horse while intoxicated.

== Lochend at Campbelltown, Adelaide ==
In 1842 Campbell purchased Sections 309 and 310 on a fertile plain beside the River Torrens near Adelaide and built a home he called "Lochend" after the ancestral home of his family in Scotland. Lochend was built of local river stone and included a stucco porch, hall and living room with a finely moulded ceiling. Campbell later substantially expanded Lochend by the addition of three bedrooms and a cellar.

Lochend included 4 acres (16,000 m^{2}) of garden and 156 acres (0.63 km^{2}) in the estate, primarily used as pastoral land. In 1849 he subdivided 16 acres (65,000 m^{2}) into 40 gardening blocks under the name "Campbelltown".

Campbell was a close friend and financier of Evelyn Sturt, who was also a local landholder of the district. It is thought that Campbell had bought land from his brother Charles Sturt in New South Wales in early 1838 (requires confirmation). After Charles Sturt's arduous expedition to explore Australia's interior from 1844 to 1846, Campbell and his near neighbour from Newenham (now a part of modern-day Paradise), Arthur Hardy, conveyed Sturt home in a carriage for part of the way on his journey from Moorundi to Adelaide in January 1846 where Sturt records he "arrived home at midnight on the 19th". Sturt named Campbell's Creek in the eastern Flinders Ranges (requires confirmation) as a tribute to Campbell.

In 1850 he married Martha Levi, sister of pastoralist Philip Levi. They had four sons together, Philip born 1851, Fredrick born 1852, Edmund born 1855 and William born 1857.

Campbell became very well known in the early days of South Australia, partially through his relationship with prominent people like Sturt, but also through his community involvement. He was a Justice of the Peace and is recorded as standing for the East Torrens Electorate of the Legislative Council in 1851. He was known as a great orator and sporting gentleman and was well liked and respected.

== North-West Bend Station ==
Campbell sold Lochend in 1858 for 2,600 pounds and purchased the pastoral occupation license for the recently established North-West Bend Station (or Nor'West Bend Station), a sheep run of 55 square miles sited where the River Murray changes from its westerly course to southerly near Morgan. This run, which carried 5,500 sheep in 1866, was on the main road from Adelaide to Wentworth. While the new homestead at that location overlooked the fertile River Murray valley, the surrounding country was an extensive semi-arid plain of bluebush with belts of mallee scrub. Campbell died there on 5 March 1859 of blood poisoning from a minor cut to hand caused by a piece of glass, which subsequently turned septic. He is interred at the West Terrace Cemetery, Adelaide and his headstone is in good condition.

His widow Martha married wealthy businessman John Beck (c. 1826 – 22 November 1903), on 7 August 1873. They left for England in 1882 and never returned. He was a director and largest shareholder of the Commercial Bank of South Australia which collapsed in February 1886. Martha died sometime around 1897.

== Legacy ==
Campbell's influence on his beloved Campbelltown was immense and lasted well past his departure from the area and subsequent untimely death. When residents of the area, then part of the District Council of Payneham, decided to form their own Council in 1868, attendees at the public meeting overwhelmingly voted to name the new District Council "Campbelltown" in his honour. The first meeting of the newly formed Council was held on 2 March 1868 at the Paradise Bridge Hotel.

In 1992 the Campbelltown High School based at Playford Road, Newton, South Australia was closed and merged with the Thorndon High School located on Campbell Road, Paradise, South Australia. The newly created school was named the Charles Campbell Secondary School in honour of Campbell. The school has been amalgamated with the Campbelltown Primary School to form the Charles Campbell College. This opened in 2012.

His house, Lochend, fell into a derelict condition and was almost irretrievable. However, it was faithfully restored to near original condition by the City of Campbelltown, South Australia under the guidance of the Campbelltown Historical Society and was officially reopened on 29 February 2004.

His great nephew was Sir Walter Campbell, a Governor of Queensland.
