= James Cowan (New Zealand writer) =

New Zealand writer and historian (1870–1943)

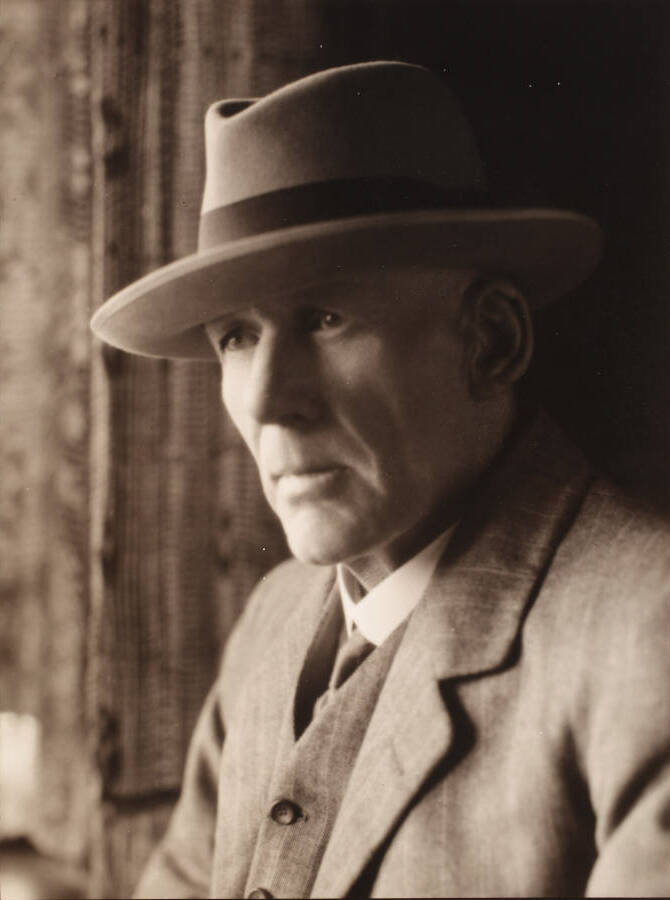
- James Cowan, 1929
- Born: 14 April 1870; East Tāmaki, New Zealand
- Died: 6 September 1943 (aged 73); Ōtaki Beach, New Zealand

James Cowan (14 April 1870 – 6 September 1943) was a New Zealand non-fiction author, noted for his books on colonial history and Māori ethnography. A fluent Māori speaker, he interviewed many veterans of the New Zealand Wars. His book The New Zealand Wars: A History of the Māori Campaigns and the Pioneering Period (1922–23) is his best known work.

== Early life ==
James Cowan, the son of William Andrew Cowan, an Irish soldier who had served in the Waikato during the New Zealand Wars, and Elizabeth Jane Qualtrough, was born at East Tāmaki on 14 April 1870. William Cowan acquired land for a farm in Kihikihi, on the border of the King Country, and this was where James grew up. There was a strong military presence in the area; the family farm included a portion of the battlefield of Orakau and was near a fortification of the Armed Constabulary. There was also a considerable Māori community in the area. Cowan grew up speaking both English and Māori and developed a keen interest in Māori culture as well as the military and colonial history of New Zealand.

In 1886 Cowan sat for a civil service examination and his marks saw him offered a cadetship with the Native Department. However, due to the influence of his mother, he declined to take it up. Instead, he aspired to become a journalist.

== Journalist ==
Thanks to his father's connections, Cowan found work in Auckland as a printer for a newspaper title, Evening Bell. He also had essays published in the New Zealand in 1887. The following year he commenced employment as a reporter at the Auckland Star and over time he developed a lively, vivid style of prose. His articles covered a range of subjects, including interviews with individuals like Te Kooti, Robert Louis Stevenson, Sir George Grey and the Māori King, and often required him to travel to remote areas of the country. In July 1894, he married Eunice Lililia Nicholas; there were no children from the relationship.

== Author ==
Cowan's first two books were published in 1901; one was a travel guide to Taupō and the other a listing of the painter Gottfried Lindauer's works of Māori subjects. In 1903 he began work for the Department of Tourist and Health Resorts in Wellington, writing magazine articles to promote tourism. He also wrote further books, on tourist attractions. Among these was the title New Zealand, or, Ao-teä-roa (the long bright world): its wealth and resources, scenery, travel routes, spas, and sport, which was intended as a handbook for tourists to the country. This work required him to travel extensively around the country.

In 1909, Cowan's wife died. By this time he was working as a freelance writer and an amateur oral historian. The Maoris of New Zealand, written in 1910 was a general survey of Māori and in 1911 he wrote The adventures of Kimble Bent, about an American who deserted the colonial forces during the land wars and who lived alongside their Māori foes.

From 1918 until 1922 Cowan was paid by the Department of Internal Affairs and worked on the publication The New Zealand wars: a history of the Maori campaigns and the pioneering period. His writing style was adventure-based and relied on anecdotes.

Other books on colonial topics included The old frontier: Te Awamutu, the story of the Waipa Valley (1922), Tales of the Maori coast (1930), Tales of the Maori bush (1934), and Hero stories of New Zealand (1935). Cowan also wrote on Māori ethnography for the Journal of the Polynesian Society, wrote The Maori yesterday and to-day, and co-wrote Legends of the Maori with Maui Pomare.

The First Labour Government granted James Cowan a pension in 1935, one of the first two New Zealand writers to receive state support. The deputation asking for this pension said of Cowan that he 'had never made any money out of his historical books but had done very good work for the country'.

In 1940, a series of history books were published as part of New Zealand's centennial celebrations. One, Settlers and pioneers, was authored by Cowan although it was not to the standard of many of his earlier works. He had to make editorial compromises, including the excision of content concerning the New Zealand Wars. He was also distressed at the lack of discussion of his writings in another title in the history series relating to the work of authors and artists in New Zealand.

== Later life ==
By 1941, Cowan's health was in serious decline and he was hospitalised the following year. He died on 6 September 1943 at Ōtaki Beach hospital in Wellington, and was survived by his wife Eileen Cowan and his two sons, Roy and Jack.
