= Douglas MacDiarmid =

New Zealand painter (1922–2020)

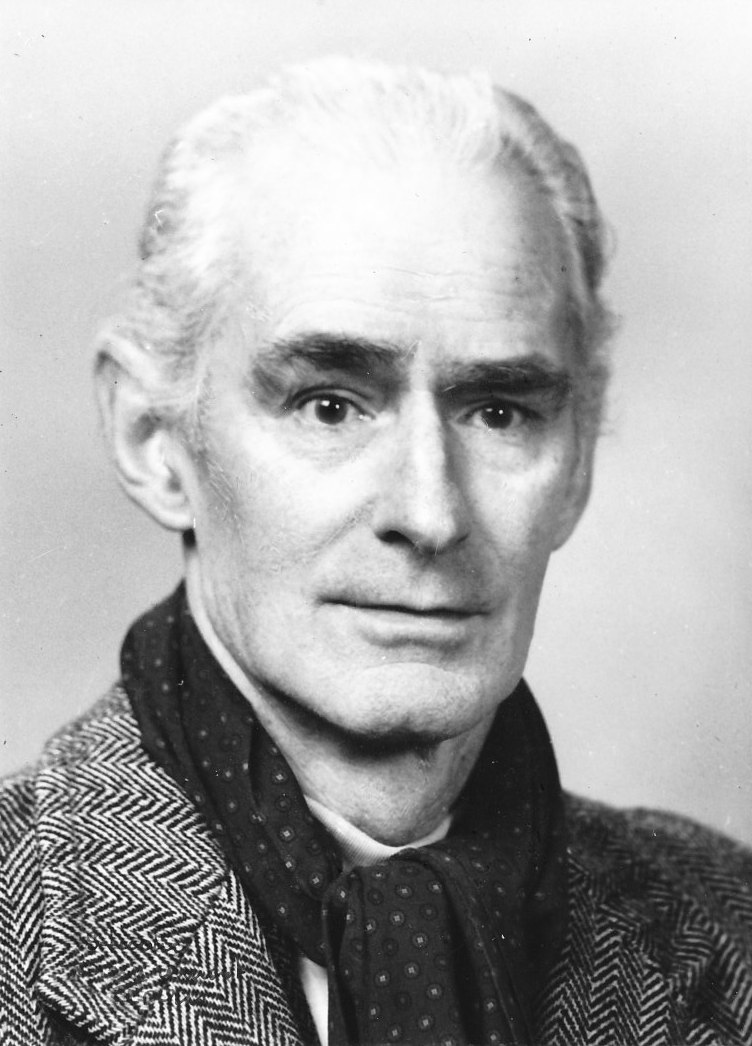
- MacDiarmid in c. 1990
- Born: Douglas Kerr MacDiarmid; 14 November 1922; Taihape, New Zealand
- Died: 26 August 2020 (aged 97); Paris, France
- Occupation: Painter
- Father: Gordon MacDiarmid
- Relatives: Alan MacDiarmid (cousin)
- Website: douglasmacdiarmid.com

Douglas Kerr MacDiarmid (14 November 1922 – 26 August 2020) was a New Zealand expatriate painter, known for his diversity and exceptional use of colour, and involved with key movements in twentieth-century art. He lived in Paris, France, for most of his career.

== Life ==
Douglas MacDiarmid was born in Taihape, in the middle of the North Island of New Zealand, the younger son of Gordon Napier MacDiarmid, country general medical practitioner and surgeon (and former army surgeon on SS Maheno), and his wife Mary Frances (née Tolme), a schoolteacher before her marriage. He was born in his family home upstairs from his father's surgery at 24 Huia Street, Taihape.

He boarded at Huntley School in Marton, and Timaru Boys' High School, then studied literature, languages, music and philosophy at Canterbury University College. His studies were interrupted by World War II military service in the army and air force at home. Although he had no formal art training, he was mentored by older members of The Group, an avant-garde set redefining New Zealand art and culture that he was closely involved with during his Christchurch years from 1940 to 1946.

While his brother Ronald Diarmid MacDiarmid (1920–2013) followed in his father's footsteps, becoming a doctor, Douglas left New Zealand after the war in 1946 to find his way as an artist, teaching and painting in London and France. After a year back in New Zealand in 1949–50, he returned to France and was based there for the rest of his life, with homeland exhibitions and regular trips back to New Zealand. He died in Paris on 26 August 2020 at the age of 97.

MacDiarmid was a cousin of the New Zealand scientist Alan MacDiarmid, one of three recipients of the Nobel Prize for Chemistry in 2000. The following year, Douglas painted a portrait of his cousin for the New Zealand Portrait Gallery collection.

His childhood home is now a bed and breakfast called Magpie Manor at 24 Huia Street, Taihape.

== Career ==
From 1952, MacDiarmid was a full-time artist in Paris. He also wrote poetry. Not confined to a style, he created landscapes, cityscapes, portraits, figures, abstract and semi-abstract forms, many inspired by his extensive travels, and exhibited successfully in France, London, Athens, New York, and Casablanca.

In 1990, MacDiarmid was brought back to New Zealand for the country's sesquicentennial celebrations, and declared a New Zealand living cultural treasure by the government of the day. His portrait was painted by Jacqueline Fahey at the time for the new New Zealand Portrait Gallery.

MacDiarmid painted the portraits of Rita Angus and Theo Schoon among others. His paintings are owned by French and New Zealand governments, the City of Paris, and public and private collections across the world, including New Zealand, Australia, the United States, France, England, Greece, Switzerland, Morocco, South Africa, China, South America, Korea, and Tahiti, as well as the collection of the late Duke and Duchess of Windsor. In 2016, two of his paintings sold through Art+Object for a record price (for the artist) of more than $27,000 each as part of the Tim and Sherrah Francis Collection, the highest grossing art auction in New Zealand history.

A series of MacDiarmid's line drawings were used to illustrate a little volume of poems by New Zealand Poet Laureate 2015–2017 C. K. Stead. Published by the Alexander Turnbull Library, the signed, limited edition book was titled In the mirror, and dancing (2017) and hand-pressed by Brendan O'Brien. The book was launched on 8 August 2017 in Wellington, with the assistance of Gregory O'Brien to celebrate the conclusion of Stead's laureateship.

Senior art historian Associate Professor Leonard Bell, of the School of Humanities at the University of Auckland, noted MacDiarmid's name missing in overviews of the history of painting in New Zealand and has welcomed the launch of his biography Colours of a Life - the life and times of Douglas MacDiarmid by Anna Cahill (2018).

MacDiarmid died from COVID-19 in 2020.

== Significant exhibitions ==
- 1945: Showed with The Group, Christchurch (also 1945, 1946, 1947, 1949, 1950, 1951, 1953, 1956, 1963)
- 1950: Helen Hitchings Gallery, Wellington (first solo show)
- 1951: Work shown at Bienniale de Menton salon exhibition, Gallery Pierre Mondal, London
- 1952: Aquarelle, Galerie Morihien, Paris (first solo French exhibition). Fifteen New Zealand Painters, Irving Galleries, Leicester, presented by Helen Hitchings as first exhibition of contemporary NZ art in Britain. Also New Forms Gallery, Athens, Greece.
- 1953: Chelsea Private Gallery, London; Galerie Royale, Paris
- 1955: Galerie Ror Volmar, Paris
- 1958: Galerie du Colisée, Paris, Galerie du Claridge, Paris. Pierre Montal Gallery group exhibition, London
- 1959: André Brooke's Gallery 91, Christchurch. John Leech Gallery, Auckland. Beaux Arts group exhibition, Paris, works selected for L'Exposition du Prix Othon Friesz, Paris
- 1960: Commonwealth Week, Midland Bank, London; Gallery Pierre Montal, London; Redfern Gallery, London. Galeries Felix Varcel, represented NZ in New York Norwich International Exhibition, London
- 1961: Architectural Centre, Wellington
- 1963: Galerie Chardin, Paris; New Forms Gallery, Athens
- 1964: Opening of NZ House, London (the first painter to exhibit there). Represented NZ at Stamford International Exhibition, Connecticut, USA
- 1965: Galerie 259 Raspail, Paris, with sculptor Dambrin. Represented at NZ painting and ceramics exhibition, New Zealand Embassy, Paris. John Leech Gallery, Auckland (also 1966, 1967, 1971, 1973)
- 1966: Ensemble exhibition, Palmerston North Public Art Gallery, NZ. Group exhibition of NZ Paintings & Pottery, NZ Embassy, Washington DC
- 1968: Retrospective MacDiarmid Exhibition, Wellington; Galerie Berri-Lardy, Paris. Represented NZ at Commonwealth Exhibition, Bristol, UK
- 1969: Bishop Suter Art Gallery, Nelson, NZ.
- 1970: Dunedin Public Art Gallery, Festival Week Exhibition. Canterbury Society of Arts Gallery, Christchurch
- 1972: Galerie Motte, Paris
- 1974: Medici Galleries, Wellington (also 1975, 1976)
- 1976: NZ House, London; Galerie Venise Cadre, Casablanca, Morocco
- 1977: Galerie Séguier, Paris
- 1979: Galeriè Bond Street, Casablanca
- 1981: Louise Beale Gallery, Wellington (also 1985)
- 1983: Galerie Lambert, Paris (also 1986)
- 1989: Chez Lonjon, Paris – first home based exhibition
- 1990: NZ Sesquicentennial Exhibition, Light Release, Louise Beale/Christopher Moore Gallery, Wellington; National Art Gallery, Wellington
- 1992: Christopher Moore Gallery, Wellington (also 1993, 1995, 1997). MacDiarmid studio exhibitions, Paris (also 1994, 1996, 1999, 2000, 2002, 2005)
- 1995: New Zealand Embassy, Paris
- 1996: Sarjeant Gallery, Wanganui, NZ
- 1999–2002: Ferner Galleries, Auckland & Wellington, NZ, MacDiarmid 50th anniversary Retrospective 1948–1998 – From the Artist's Studio, followed by Celebrating the artist at 80 retrospective to coincide with the New Zealand launch of art history book MacDiarmid by French art historian Nelly Finet
- 2003: St Tropez, France, solo exhibition for 5th Australia/New Zealand Film Festival
- 2004: NZ Embassy residence, Paris
- 2006: Hocken Collections, Dunedin NZ, Douglas MacDiarmid: A Very Generous Gift; St Tropez, France 11–15 October. This show supported the release of A Stranger Everywhere documentary at Australia/New Zealand Film Festival; Otago University Auckland Centre; NZ Embassy exhibition, Paris
- 2008: New Zealand Embassy, Paris, also 2011 exhibition in aid of Christchurch earthquake reparation
- 2013: Montmartre, Paris exhibition with expatriate NZ sculptor Marion Fountain; Jonathan Grant Gallery, Auckland Douglas MacDiarmid: An Artist Abroad
- 2015: Early work shown in Museum of New Zealand Te Papa Tongarewa autumn Nga Toi exhibition, Wellington
- 2017: University of Auckland's Gus Fisher Gallery exhibited work covering a period of six decades, gifted to the University of Auckland Art Collection by Douglas in 2015.
- 2018: Colours of a Life: Douglas MacDiarmid, New Zealand Portrait Gallery. Coinciding with the publication of his biography by the same name, this was an exhibition curated by Anna Cahill and Jaenine Parkinson to celebrate the life and art of MacDiarmid, including a survey of his portraits and figurative works that span from realist figuration through to geometric abstraction, and showcasing his vibrant use of colour and the network of relationships the artist formed to places and people throughout his life and career.

== Bibliography ==
- Bell, L., "In transit: Questions of home and belonging in New Zealand art," presented and transcribed as part of the 2006 Gordon H. Brown Lecture series.
- Bell, L., "A stranger everywhere: Douglas MacDiarmid and New Zealand," Art New Zealand 123 (Winter 2007), pp. 76–81, 95.
- Brown, G. H., (1981) New Zealand painting 1940–1960: Conformity and dissension, Wellington: QEII Arts Council. pp. 46, 50–51, 58, 61, 100.
- Cahill, A., (2017) "Douglas MacDiarmid: A man for all seasons", Contemporary Hum
- Cahill, A., (2018) Colours of a Life: The life and times of Douglas MacDiarmid, Auckland: Mary Egan Publishing. ISBN 9780473423834
- Finet, N., (2002) MacDiarmid, Paris: Editions STAR.
- Fraser, R., "Douglas MacDiarmid: A conversation with an expatriate," Art New Zealand 59 (Winter 1991) pp. 84, 87, 105.
- Frizzell, D., (2012) It's all about the image, Auckland: Random House NZ. ISBN 9781869797072
- Grinda, E., (2006) A Stranger Everywhere, (52-minute documentary film on MacDiarmid's work and views). Hong Kong: Artisan Limited.
- Johnstone, C., (2006) Landscape paintings of New Zealand: A journey from north to south, Auckland: Godwit Press.
- MacDiarmid, D. "What is art supposed to do?" Ascent: A journal of the arts in New Zealand, 1, 1, (November 1967) pp. 11–15.
- Norman, P., (2006) Douglas Lilburn: His life and work, Christchurch: Canterbury University Press.
- O'Brien, G., (2008) Back and Beyond: New Zealand Painting for the Young and Curious, Auckland: Auckland University Press. ISBN 9781869404048
- Simpson, P., (2016) Bloomsbury South: The Arts in Christchurch 1933–1953, Auckland: Auckland University Press. ISBN 9781869408480
- Trevelyan, J., (2008) Rita Angus: An artist's life, Wellington: Te Papa.
- Wolfe, R., (2008) New Zealand portraits, Auckland: Penguin. ISBN 9780670071777
