= Charles Decimus Barraud =

New Zealand pharmacist and artist (1822–1897)

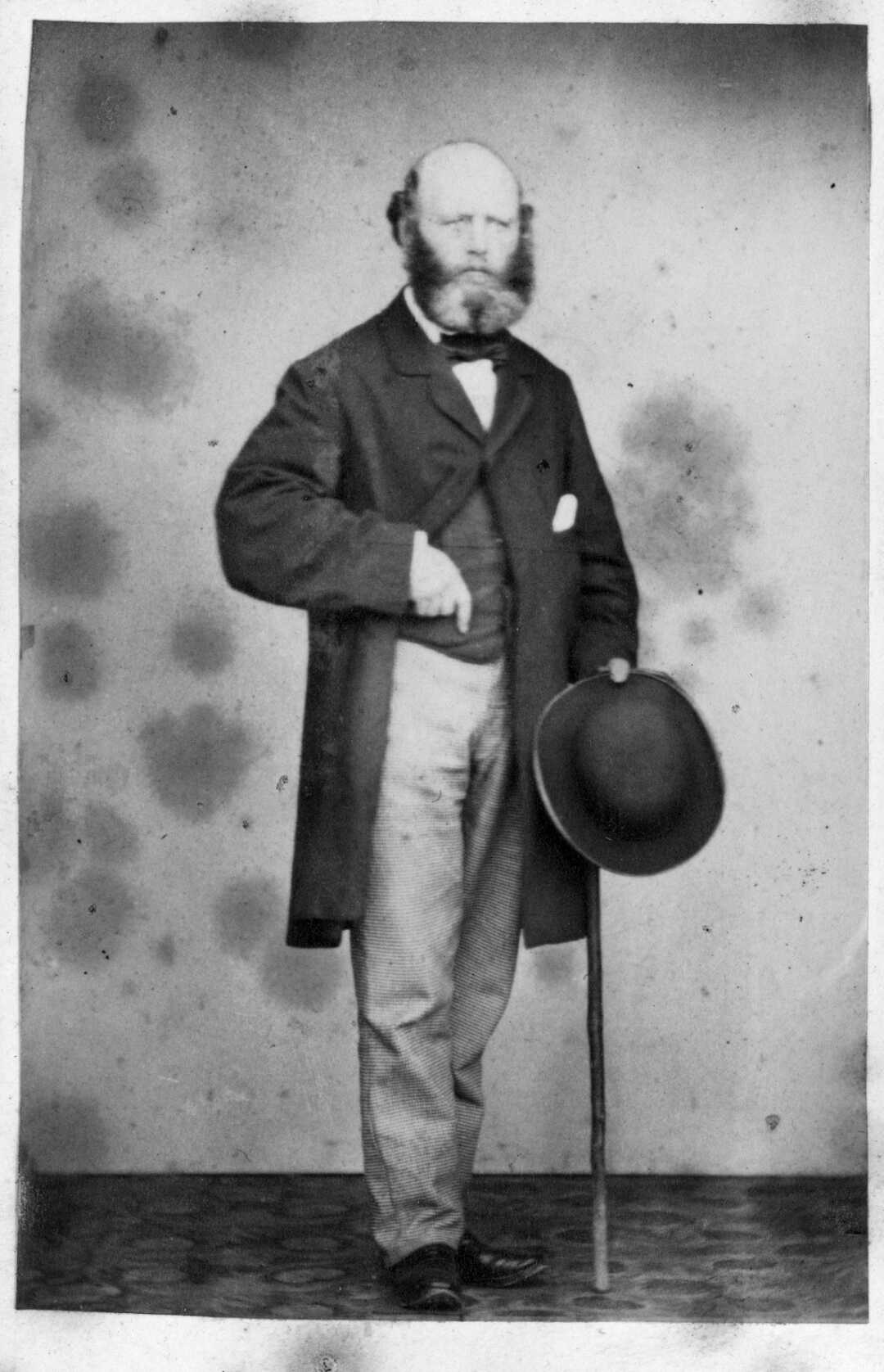
- Charles Decimus Barraud, c. 1860s
- Born: 9 May 1822
- Died: 26 December 1897 (aged 75)
- Spouse: Sarah Barraud (m. 1849; died 1895)
- Children: 9 including Jessie Sarah Wright

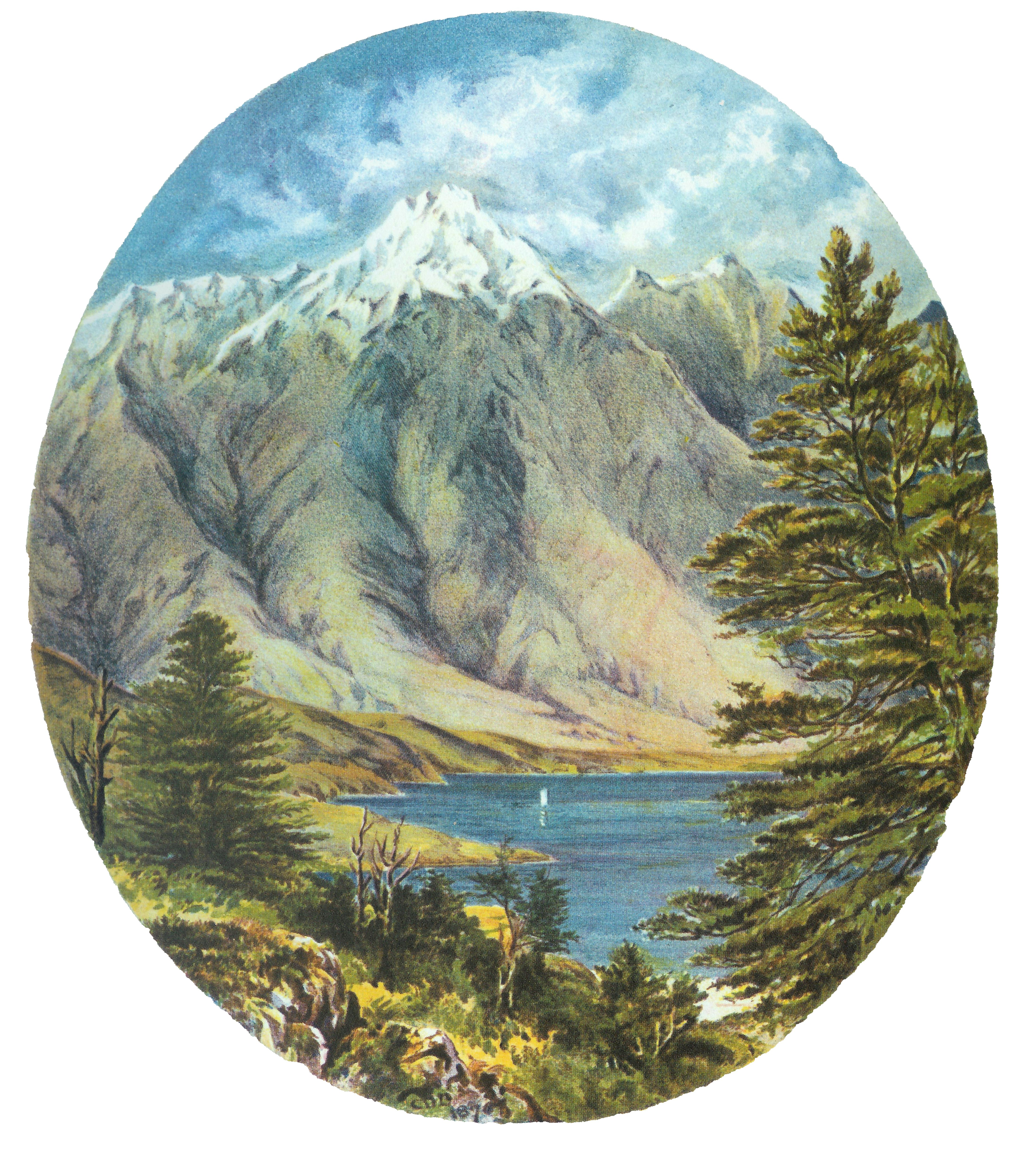
"The Remarkables" by Charles Decimus Barraud – chromo lithograph published 1877; original painted between 1849 and 1875

Charles Decimus Barraud (9 May 1822 – 26 December 1897) was a New Zealand pharmacist and artist.

== Biography ==
The tenth recorded child of William Francis Barraud and his wife, Sophia Hull, Charles was born in Camberwell, Surrey, England on 9 May 1822.

He emigrated with his family to New Zealand, arriving in Wellington in August 1849. Barraud married Sarah Maria Style on 17 March 1849 at St Lawrence's Church, Southampton. The marriage produced six recorded sons and three daughters, including Jessie Sarah Wright. His wife was a cousin of Judge Henry Samuel Chapman, and it was Chapman who encouraged the emigration, lending the Barrauds a cottage when they arrived, and in which they lived until their own house had been built.

Barraud quickly set up shop in Lambton Quay as a pharmacist. At the same time he soon gained recognition as an artist, at this point regarded as an "enthusiastic amateur", and working mostly in watercolours. He painted the children of Henry Petre in 1850, but the visiting Charlotte Godley, who wanted a portrait of her son Arthur, was scathing of his talent:

There is a chemist here who has lately turned artist, and who has perpetrated a few likenesses, very like, but very bad... If it were likely to be tolerable I should so like to have Arthur done, but I am afraid it would be only a disappointment.
