= Henry Stowell =

New Zealand interpreter and genealogist

- Stowell in c. 1929
- Born: 4 February 1859; Waimate North, New Zealand
- Died: 23 March 1944 (aged 85); Wellington, New Zealand
- Children: 8, including Eileen Constance Cowan
- Writing career
- Pen name: Hare Hongi
- Notable work: Māori–English Tutor and Vade Mecum

Henry Matthew Stowell (4 February 1859 – 23 March 1944), also known by the pen-name Hare Hongi, was a New Zealand language interpreter and genealogist of European and Māori descent.

== Biography ==
Stowell was born on 4 February 1859 in Waimate North in New Zealand's Northland. His father was John Shephard Stowell, a sawyer who had come from the United States. His mother was Hūhana (Susan) Farley, daughter of Matthew Farley and Rīmaumau (Maumau), a high-born woman of the Ngāpuhi iwi. He attended schools in Auckland, firstly, Singer's School, Parnell and later, Three Kings College (Wesleyan Native Institution), Mount Roskill, after intervention from Governor George Grey.

In his teens, he spent over a year at Waitaha village, near Ahipara, where he learned Māori lore from Ngā Kuku Mumu, a tohunga. He went to live at Waiwhetū, in the Hutt Valley.

After school, he became a surveyor in Northland, and, in 1888, became an authorised Māori–English interpreter in the Native Land Court at Taranaki and later, Wellington. He travelled from Cape Reinga to the Bluff twice, studying Māori language, and collecting histories, lore and legends. He published books, articles and produced radio broadcasts.

In November 1886, Stowell had a son, Hector Arthur Ngāpua Stowell, with his brother Samuel's wife, Ellen. In 1891, he married Mary Rachel Robson, the daughter of James Robson, a sawmiller, and Mere Ngāmai, also known as Mary Harrison. They had six daughters including Eileen Constance Cowan, an illustrator, photographer, and painter, and a son, who died during the influenza epidemic.

He published on Māori issues, often with The Journal of the Polynesian Society and with Christchurch's Weekly Press. Between 1920 and 1940, he struggled to have his writings published, in a space dominated by Pākehā. He would occasionally publish with the title of "Professor of Māori," which did not otherwise exist. It was noted that Stowell was "unusual in claiming the role of a Māori authority in a forum dominated by Pākehā, such as the press."

Stowell died in Wellington on 23 March 1944.

== Publications ==
Stowell authored the Māori–English Tutor and Vade Mecum, published in 1911, the first Māori grammar written by a Māori author, which also included Māori topics such as "ailments and diseases, sport and past times, tohunga, the lore of tapu, marriage customs and land tenure." It used the Ngāpuhi dialect as standard Māori language, and considered all other versions as dialects.

He published several articles under the name Hare Hongi, including:

- Hongi, H. (1898). "CONCERNING WHARE-KURA: ITS PHILOSOPHIES AND TEACHINGS." The Journal of the Polynesian Society, 7(1(25)), 35–41.
- Hongi, Hare (1907). "A MAORI COSMOGONY." The Journal of the Polynesian Society. 16 (3(63)): 113–119.
- Hongi, Hare. (1909). "ON ARIKI, AND INCIDENTALLY, TOHUNGA." The Journal of the Polynesian Society, 18 (2(70)), 84–89.
- Hongi, Hare. (1912). "WHIRO AND TOI." The Journal of the Polynesian Society, 21 (2(82)), 29–38.
- Skinner, H. D., & Hongi, Hare. (1916). "ON MUMMIFICATION." The Journal of the Polynesian Society, 25 (4(100)), 169–172.
- Hongi, Hare. (1916). "KURANUI AS A NAME FOR THE MOA." The Journal of the Polynesian Society, 25 (2(98)), 66–67.
- Hongi, Hare. (1918). "ON THE GREENSTONE “TIKI.” WHAT THE EMBLEM SIGNIFIES." The Journal of the Polynesian Society, 27 (3(107)), 162–163.
- Hongi, Hare. (1918). "AN ANCIENT 'FLUTE-SONG.'" The Journal of the Polynesian Society, 27 (4(108)), 222–224.
- Hongi, Hare (1920). "THE GODS OF MAORI WORSHIP. SONS OF LIGHT." The Journal of the Polynesian Society, 29 (1(113)), 24–28.

In 1929, he began a series of radio broadcasts on the pronunciation and meaning of Māori place names, which was shortly abandoned. Hare Hongi also published several poems including "The Defence of Orakau" and "Maori Hymn to the Creator."

There are extensive archives of his unpublished work now held in Te Puna Mātauranga o Aotearoa The National Library of New Zealand. Stowell's book, Maori-English Tutor and Vade Mecum, published in 1911, was listed in Books of Mana as one of the 180 most significant works of Māori-authored non-fiction.
