= Opuha Dam =

Coordinates: 44°00′02″S 170°53′28″E

- Interactive map of Opuha Dam
- Country: New Zealand
- Location: South Canterbury
- Purpose: Irrigation
- Opening date: 7 November 1998

Dam and spillways
- Type of dam: Earth

Reservoir
- Creates: Lake Ophua

Power Station
- Turbines: 1
- Dam collapsed during construction

The Opuha Dam is located on the Opuha River, a tributary of the Ōpihi River in South Canterbury, New Zealand. The dam is used for water storage for farming irrigation and provides electricity to New Zealand's national grid.

== Description ==
The 50 metres (160 ft) high dam features a 710 hectare lake, Lake Opuha, storing up to 74 million cubic metres of water. The lake is commonly used for recreational activity. The water storage scheme provides irrigation for 16,000 hectares of farmland, along with water for the Timaru District.

The dam also has a seven megawatt hydroelectric power station that contributes to the local electricity network, producing enough electricity to power up to 5,000 homes a year.

Impacts on the health of the Opuha River below the dam have been identified. Algal blooms and the continued presence of invasive algae species have been linked to the regulation of water flow, reducing the frequency and size of high flow events. Research has shown there have been significant decreases in water clarity, and significant increases in turbidity since the construction of the dam.

During a period of drought in 2024, the low level of water in the dam brought a stop to the irrigation scheme. The water shortage was due to El Niño conditions and reduced snowmelt.

The site has been identified as an Important Bird Area by BirdLife International because it supports breeding colonies of the endangered black-billed gull.

== Development ==
In the 1980s, there were no restrictions on water takes for irrigation from the Ōpihi River, which would often run dry. This led to the development of the dam for water storage, in order to keep the rivers flowing during periods of drought.

The dam failed during construction on 6 February 1997 due to heavy rain. It was completed in 1998, creating Lake Opuha.

An aeration system was installed in 2003, in order to counteract oxygen depletion in the lake. In 2026, an outlet valve for controlled releases of large volumes of water from the dam was installed, in order to provide flood protection during a high rainfall a weather event.
