= New Zealand Academy of Fine Arts =

New Zealand visual arts society

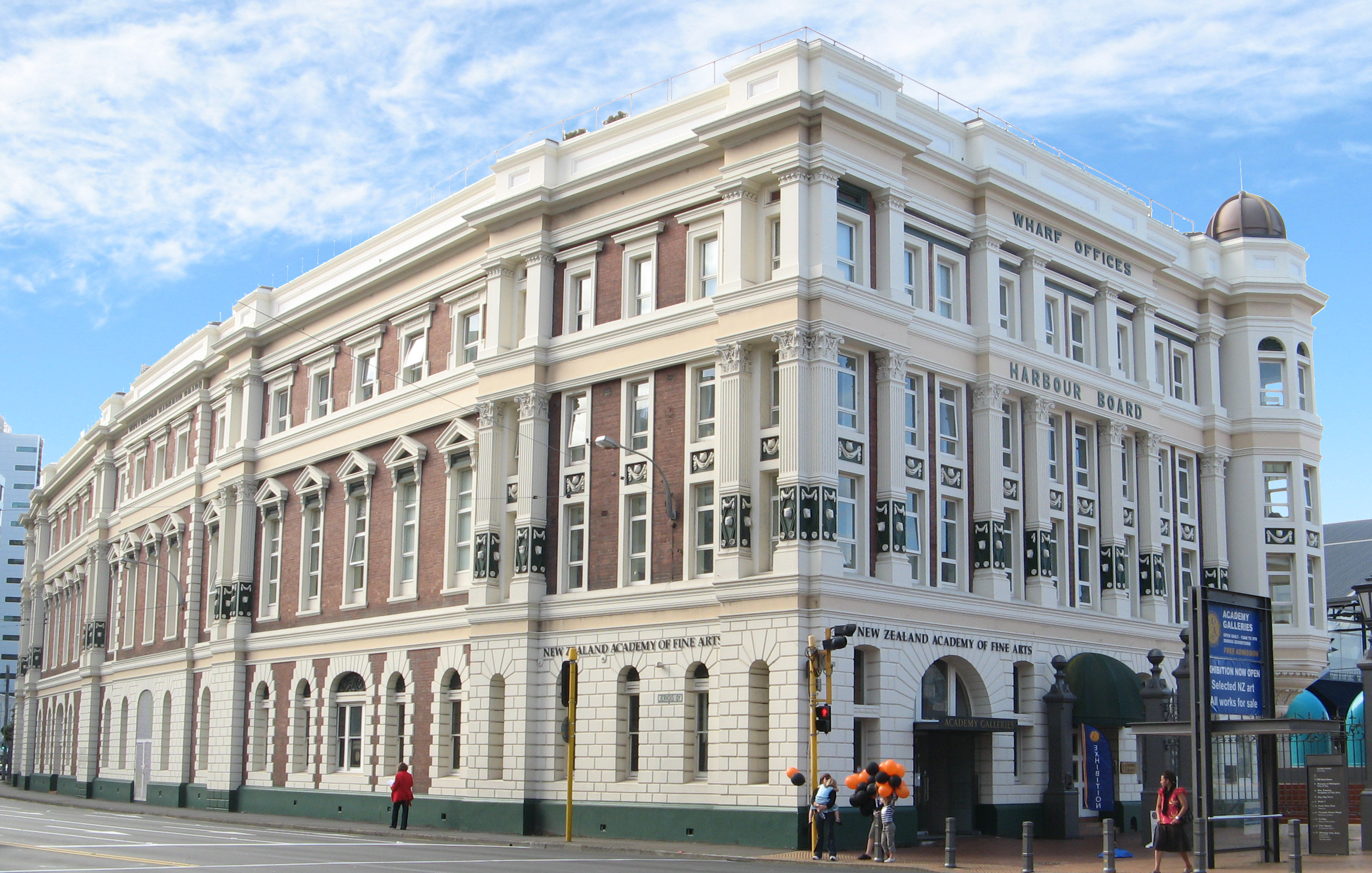
The Wharf Offices building in Wellington, home of the academy from 1998 to 2024

The New Zealand Academy of Fine Arts (also referred to as the Wellington Art Society) was founded in Wellington in July 1882 as The Fine Arts Association of New Zealand. Founding artists included painters William Beetham (first president of the Association) and Charles Decimus Barraud. The association changed its name to the New Zealand Academy of Fine Arts and was incorporated as a limited company in 1889. Charles Barraud was elected the academy's president at its first AGM on 1 July 1889.

The Governor-General of New Zealand is the traditional patron of the academy.

== Galleries ==
The academy was granted a section of reclaimed land on Whitmore Street by the government, and its premises were constructed there in 1892. Architects involved in the building's design were Academy members Christian Toxward and Frederick de Jersey Clere. The building was used for the academy's exhibitions and made available for hire as a source of revenue. It was later opened to the public as The Academy Free Art Gallery by Wellington mayor Thomas William Hislop, on 14 June 1907. Extensions to the gallery building, funded by grants from the government and the Macarthy Trust and by a loan from the National Bank, were designed by de Jersey Clere and another architect named Baun. The building ultimately proved unsatisfactory and, after protracted discussions within the academy membership and negotiations with the government, the academy decided to sell its land and gallery and put the proceeds towards the cost of constructing a national art gallery, in exchange for permanent accommodation in the new gallery. The Reserves and other Lands Disposal Act 1928 was passed to permit the sale and donation to go ahead, and in 1936 the academy sold the Whitmore Street property and donated the proceeds to the new Dominion Museum and National Art Gallery of New Zealand, on the proviso that they would be accommodated in the new Dominion Museum building on Buckle Street.

When the National Museum and the National Art Gallery of New Zealand moved to Museum of New Zealand Te Papa Tongarewa the academy was paid compensation of $1.2 million to enable it to establish itself elsewhere. The academy was based in the Wharf Offices building at 1 Queens Wharf from 1998 until 2024. The refurbishment of the building for the academy in 2000 won the architects Heriot + Melhuish the New Zealand Institute of Architects award 2001.

== Exhibitors ==
Artists who have exhibited their work at the academy include Gottfried Lindauer, Frances Hodgkins, Charles Goldie, Rita Angus, Ralph Hotere and John Drawbridge.

== Collection ==
The academy's Whitmore Street property had housed the national art collection as well as the academy's permanent collection. During the transition to the new National Art Gallery all art belonging to the academy was transferred into the national collection, despite some opposition.

== Officers ==
President
Year(s)	Name	Notes
1882-1884	William Beetham	First President of the Fine Arts Association of New Zealand
1884-1889	Charles Decimus Barraud	
1889-1898	Charles Decimus Barraud	First President of the New Zealand Academy of Fine Arts
1898–1907	Dr Walter Fell	
1907–1911	H S Wardell	
1911–1919	H M Gore	
1919–1923, 1929–1931	T Shailer Weston	
1923–1927	E W Hunt	
1927–1931	C Wilson	
1931–1932	George Troup	
1932–1938	David Ewen	
1938–1949	G G Gibbes Watson	
1949–1963	W S Wauchop	
1963–1967	J O Mercer	
1967–1971	R J Waghorn	
1971–1974	Ian F Calder	
1974–1988	Brian S Carmody	
	Philip Markham	
−2014	Ian Hamlin	
2014–	Greg Chaston	
2022-	Wayne Newman	

== Fellows ==
The council of the academy bestows the Governor-General's Award periodically to an artist who is a member of the New Zealand Academy of Fine Arts, and who has made a significant contribution to the arts in New Zealand over an extended period of time. A maximum of one award is made in any given year. The recipient also becomes a fellow of the New Zealand Academy of Fine Arts. The list of fellowships awarded to date is shown below.

Year	Name	Notes
1983	Evelyn Page	Inaugural award
1984	Bill Sutton	
1985	Peter McIntyre	
1986	Brian Brake	
1988	Roy Cowan	
1989	John Drawbridge	
1990	Doris Lusk	
1991	Doreen Blumhardt	
1992	Rangimarie Hetet	
1993	Raymond Boyce	
1994	Shona McFarlane	
1996	Tui McLauchlan	
2000	Philip Markham	
2003	Mirek Smíšek	
2004	Nahleen Markham	Honorary award
2006	Avis Higgs	
2007	Robin Kay	
2009	Jeanne Macaskill	
2017	Michael Browne	
