= Opuha River =

River in New Zealand

Coordinates: 44°11′S 171°00′E

Opuha River down from Lake Opuha

The Opuha River (Māori: Ōpūaha) is in Canterbury, New Zealand. A tributary of the Ōpihi River, its two branches flow southeast for 35 kilometres (22 mi) before joining the larger river between Geraldine and Fairlie.

Heavy rainfall caused the collapse of the Opuha Dam during its construction on the river in 1997.
