= Clontarf (ship) =

The Clontarf, an immigration clipper ship, sailed from England to New Zealand between 1858 and 1860 on commission for the Canterbury Provincial Council, the governing body of Canterbury Province. Sailing under the flag of Willis, Gann and Co, it set out on its first voyage from Plymouth on 20 September 1858, and after a journey of 105 days arrived at Lyttelton, New Zealand, on 5 January 1859 with 412 immigrants. Six infants and one adult died on the journey, plus there was a still-birth.

With one successful run complete it returned to England to collect its next passengers. On 30 November 1859 the Clontarf left London with 430 people on board. This voyage met with unforgiving bad weather, and a rampant plague of measles, whooping cough and tropical diseases swept mercilessly through the ship. It arrived at Lyttelton on 16 March 1860 with many fatalities. On a normal voyage for immigration ship of that time it was expected that up to five people might die from frailty, accident or birth at sea. On the second voyage of the Clontarf 41 people died: five adults and 36 children. This would give the Clontarf her infamy. Due to her reputation, prospective immigrants chose not to sail on her, and she was officially dismissed of her duties of ferrying immigrants to New Zealand in 1861.

== Notable passengers ==
=== 1858/59 journey ===
- John Acland (1823–1904), farmer and politician
- Edward Sealy (1839–1903), surveyor, photographer and farmer
- William Gapes (1822–1903), pioneer and namesake of Gapes Valley
