= Helen Hitchings =

New Zealand art dealer

Helen Hitchings (17 June 1920 – 4 July 2002) was a New Zealand art dealer, best known for the short-lived but influential eponymous dealer gallery she opened in Wellington in 1949.

== Gallery of Helen Hitchings ==
At age 28 Hitchings opened New Zealand's first modernist dealer gallery, in a converted warehouse space at 39 Bond Street in central Wellington. Previous to this she had worked as a theatre designer and advertising assistant.

In the gallery Hitchings showed the work of emerging painters who went on to become major figures in New Zealand art, including Toss Woollaston, Rita Angus and Colin McCahon, alongside Douglas MacDiarmid and Evelyn Page. She recruited the modernist architect Ernst Plischke to produce furniture designs sold through the gallery, and A. R. D. Fairburn and May Smith to design textiles. Hitchings also showed the work of important potter Len Castle. Hitchings also designed pieces of pottery which were commercially produced and sold through her gallery.

Hitchings sought to create an informal atmosphere at the gallery, serving visitors coffee and encouraging them to touch and feel for themselves. In a radio interview in 1950 she said "The atmosphere says immediately - come in, have a cigarette and look at and feel and handle everything, and see what ideas you get and equally important, what are the ideas of others . . . There are no KEEP OFF THE GRASS signs anywhere in the gallery."

Contemporary photographs of the gallery show a simple, airy space where furniture, ceramics, textiles and artworks are displayed together, suggesting how a modern home could be decorated.

In 1951 Hitchings went to London, taking a selection of New Zealand art with her to exhibit. On her return she was unable to reopen her gallery, but despite the short period in which it operated, the gallery is recognised as an important moment in the post-war development of New Zealand culture, especially in terms of creating an audience for modernist work. Art historian Gordon H. Brown has observed that the gallery created ‘a clientele who more easily were able to develop a sense of artistic discrimination through exposure to a continuously changing display of carefully selected paintings, prints and handicrafts’

== Recognition and influence ==
In 2008 the Museum of Wellington City & Sea staged an exhibition recreating Hitchings’ gallery. In 2015 the Museum of New Zealand Te Papa Tongarewa opened an exhibition The Gallery of Helen Hitchings which features photographs of Hitchings alongside objects sold through or similar to those presented at her gallery.

In 2016 Wellington artist Erica van Zon produced a body of work in homage to Hitchings, titled Coffee Perhaps. The work was displayed at The Dowse Art Museum.

== Further information ==
The archives of the Helen Hitchings Gallery are held in the Te Papa archives.

Justine Olsen, curator of Decorative and Applied Arts at Te Papa, was interviewed about Helen Hitchings and the influence of her gallery in 2015.
