= John Drawbridge =

New Zealand artist (1930–2005)

John Drawbridge MBE
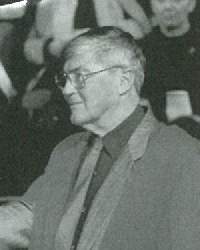
- Drawbridge in 2002
- Born: John Boys Drawbridge; 27 December 1930; Wellington, New Zealand
- Died: 24 July 2005 (aged 74); Wellington, New Zealand
- Occupations: painter, printmaker
- Known for: murals
- Spouse: Tanya Ashken

John Boys Drawbridge MBE (27 December 1930 – 24 July 2005) was a New Zealand artist, muralist and printmaker. He was famous for his murals in public places: for the foyer of New Zealand House in London in the 1960s, the Beehive in the 1970s, and for the New Zealand Pavilion at Expo 70 in Japan.

== Early life and career ==
Drawbridge was the son of Samuel Drawbridge, Wellington's City Treasurer, and Elma Wylie. He was born in the Wellington suburb of Karori and attended the Wellington Teachers College from 1948 to 1949 completing his teacher training the following year at Dunedin Training College. During the fifties Drawbridge was a regular contributor to the School Journal, Primary School Bulletin, Tusitala mo vasega tetele Samoa, School Bulletin on Niue along with doing design work and covers for the literary journal Hilltop in 1949 and a Design Review in 1953. Charles Brasch also published Drawbridge's work in Landfall during the fifties and in 1964 Drawbridge was asked to design the Landfall cover for the four issues of vol 18 and used again in a range of different colours the following year. In 1957 he was awarded a National Art Gallery Traveling Scholarship taking him to the UK to study at the Central School of Art and Design in London for three years. Three years later in 1960 Drawbridge married the sculptor Tanya Ashken who was also a student at the Central School of Arts and together they moved to Paris so he could study under SM. Hayter at Atelier 17 and later under Johnny Friedlaender. In 1963 Drawbridge showed his work at the Redfern Gallery run by Rex Nan Kivell in London.

== Return to New Zealand ==
Drawbridge, along with Ashken, returned to New Zealand at the end of 1963 and in 1964 he was appointed as a tutor in printmaking at the Wellington Polytech School of Design (now Massey University, College of Creative Arts) and taught there for 25 years.

After his return Drawbridge was considered one of New Zealand's most significant artists, but fell out of favour with the art critics of the late 1970s and 1980s (his work being seen as too international during a time when regional realism was helping define a New Zealand identity). After his death in 2005 his contribution to the New Zealand art scene has been revisited, on a number of occasions, by an increasing number of champions (notably by Dr. Damian Skinner, of Auckland Museum).

He lived at Island Bay in Wellington for over 40 years with his artist wife Tanya Ashken; they had two sons, Tony and Cameron. In 1967 there was controversy about one of his oil paintings of Island Bay which was gifted to Canada. He was born and died in Wellington.

== Selected commissions ==
1962 Drawbridge was commissioned to make mural for New Zealand House in London Watching the Queen open the building and view the mural in 1963 Drawbridge was reportedly a bit to see the Queen's gown brush close to his mural and its still freshly painted surface. The mural has since been removed from New Zealand House and is now displayed in Victoria University's Maclaurin Building.

1970 Drawbridge's mural for the Osaka Expo’70 was later reinstalled in the National Library The mural was based on Drawbridge's fascination with the pin-point light sources he saw created by glow worms in the Waitomo Caves.

1973 Wins the competition for the Beehive (Executive wing of the New Zealand Parliament) mural.

1990 Creates stained glass windows and stations of the cross for the Home of Compassion chapel designed by Structon Group. In 2019 Tennent Brown designed a side chapel dedicated to Suzanne Aubert's life and with the Drawbridge family's help converted Drawbridge drawing into a stained glass window for the building.

== Documentary film ==
In 1949, at the age of 19, Drawbridge had been invited to produce a water colour record of an ascent of Mount Aspiring by Brian Brake (acting as cinematographer), Douglas Lilburn (composer) and James K Baxter the poet to be filmed by the National Film Unit. The attempt failed and the film never realised but the experience left a deep impression on Drawbridge. The 45 watercolour and pastel drawings and Drawbridge's storyboard survived and are now held in the Turnbull Library in Wellington. Fifty seven years later in 2006 Drawbridge traveled back to the Matukituki Valley with a film crew, and revisited the Aspiring Hut for the documentary film Aspiring.

== Selected exhibitions ==
- Group Show 1952, Christchurch. 1952
- The Group Show ‘56, Christchurch. 1956
- The Group Show ‘66, Christchurch. 1966
- 20/20 Vision. (group) 1966
- New Zealand Painting (group) Auckland City Art Gallery. 1966
- 10th International Exhibition of Drawings and Engravings (group) Lugano, Switzerland. 1968 Prize winner.
- The Group, Christchurch. 1968
- Local Colour (group). City Gallery Wellington. 1995
- John Drawbridge: Wide Open Interior City Gallery Wellington. 2002
- Pieces of Eight (group) Dunedin Public Art Gallery. 2011 Curated By Aaron Kreisler.

== Selected public collections ==
- Auckland City Art Gallery Toi o Tāmaki
- Aratoi, Wairarapa Museum of History and Art, Masterton
- British Museum, London
- Christchurch Art Gallery
- Dowse Art Gallery, Lower Hutt
- Dunedin Public Art Gallery
- Govett-Brewster Art Gallery, New Plymouth
- National Gallery of Australia, Canberra
- Sarjeant Gallery, Whanganui
- Suter Gallery, Nelson
- Te Manawa Museum of Art, Science and History, Palmerston North
- Museum of New Zealand Te Papa Tongarewa, Wellington
- Victoria and Albert Museum, London
- Victoria University, Wellington
- Waikato Art Museum, Hamilton
- Wellington City Council

== Awards ==
1971 Manawatu Art Prize

1972 Queen Elizabeth II Arts Council Fellowship.

1978 Appointed a Member of the Order of the British Empire in the 1978 New Year Honours list for services to art.

1988 National Bank Art Award for Abstract Art.

2002 Honorary Doctorate of Literature from Massey University and inducted into the Massey Hall of Fame.

== Publication references ==
- Cape, Peter, 'John Drawbridge: techniques and values’, Landfall 106 (June) 1973: 130-47.
- Cape, Peter, Prints and printmakers in New Zealand, Auckland: William Collins Pub. Ltd, 1974.
- Foster, Susan, ‘Wellington: Chris Booth, John Drawbridge, Ans Westra’, Art New Zealand 33 (summer) 1984: 16–17.
- Hutchings, P, 'Eight New Zealand abstract painters, Art International XIX/1 (January 20) 1975: 23–24.
- Kirker, Anne, 'John Drawbridge: From print to construction, Art New Zealand 24, (Winter) 1982: p 18–21.
- McIntosh, Jill (ed.), Contemporary New Zealand prints, Wellington: Allen & Unwin with Wellington City Art Gallery, 1989.
- Morel, Mary, 'Printmaker/Illusionist’, Pacific Way, 1987: 57–60.
- National Art Gallery (ed.), Face to face: a survey of artists’ prints, Wellington: National Art Gallery, New Zealand, 1986.
- O’Sullivan, Vincent, Brother Jonathan, Brother Kafka, Wellington: Oxford University Press, 1980.
- Roberts, Ian The New Zealand Print Council’, Ascent 1(1) November 1967: 45.
- Skinner, Damian (ed), John Drawbridge, Auckland: Ron Sang Publications, 2008.
- Stocker, Mark, 'A window into John Drawbridge’, Art New Zealand 103 (Winter) 2002: 74–79.
