= List of historic places in Mackenzie District =

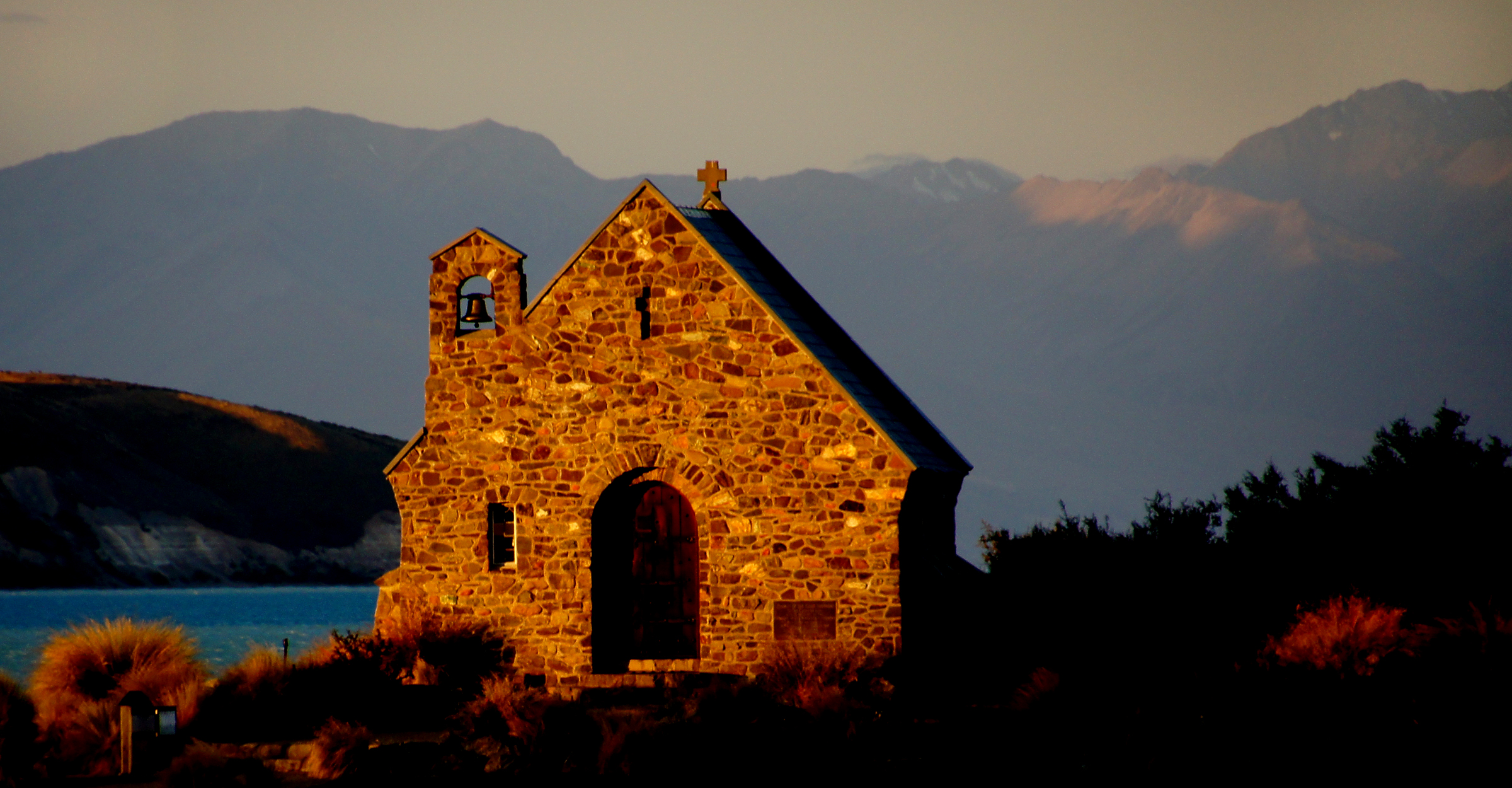
The Church of the Good Shepherd, a Category 1 Historic Place at Lake Tekapo

The Mackenzie District is a territorial authority in the Canterbury Region of the South Island of New Zealand. A large inland plain at the foothills of the Southern Alps, it was frequently visited by Māori hunting parties, but sparsely populated. European settlers established sheep runs in the area by the 1850s. The district was named for James Mckenzie, a prominent local outlaw and sheep thief. Tourism to Aoraki / Mount Cook, the highest mountain in New Zealand, was established in the late 19th and early 20th centuries and became a prominent local industry. This was supplemented by hydroelectricity following the construction of the Waitaki power scheme in the mid-20th century.

Heritage New Zealand classifies sites on the New Zealand Heritage List / Rārangi Kōrero in accordance with the Heritage New Zealand Pouhere Taonga Act 2014. It distinguishes between Category 1 ("places of special or outstanding historical or cultural significance") and Category 2 ("places of historic or cultural significance"). Sites containing a number of related significant places are listed as Historic Areas. Additionally, sites important to Māori communities are given special classifications, although none are located within Mackenzie District. A total of thirty listed sites are located in the Mackenzie District, including three Category 1 sites, one historic area, and twenty-six Category 2 sites. An additional Category 2 site—the War Memorial in Fairlie—was demolished in 1999 and delisted.

== Sites ==
List of historic places in Mackenzie District
| Name | Classification | Location | Constructed | Registered | List number | Notes | Image | Ref. |
|---|---|---|---|---|---|---|---|---|
| Mount Cook Road Board Building (Former) | Category 2 | 2098 Fairlie-Tekapo Road, Burkes Pass | 1875–1876 | 2015 | 9527 | A relatively grand concrete building built as an office for the regional road board. The Mackenzie County Council met at the building from 1883 until 1891, when it moved to Fairlie. The building has since served as a private residence. | | |
| Irishman Creek Industrial Historic Area | Historic Area | 1415 Tekapo-Twizel Road, Irishman Creek | —N/a | 1983 | 7060 | A 8,642 ha (21,350 acres) sheep station adjacent to Lake Pukaki. Purchased by the engineer Bill Hamilton in 1921, it saw use as an engineering training facility during World War II, and was the site of early testing of jetboats during the 1950s and 1960s. | | |
| Walnut Cottage | Category 2 | 760 Fairlie-Tekapo Road, Kimbell | 1878 | 1993 | 5476 | A cottage built from local limestone in 1878. It previously saw use as a post office. | | |
| Fairlie County Library (former) | Category 2 | 6 Allandale Road, Fairlie | 1914 | 1984 | 3335 | A former Carnegie library designed by a Timaru architectural firm. Including living quarters for a resident librarian in the upper floor, it was used as a library until the mid-1990s. | An old brick library with a brown roof and a large brick chimney. A sign on the side reads "THE OLD LIBRARY" | |
| Mt Cook Line Building (Former Stables) 1906 | Category 2 | 51 Main Street, Fairlie | 1906 | 1984 | 3328 | —N/a | A one-storey building with a sign reading AD 1906. A smaller sign on the building reads "Mitsubishi Electric" | |
| Gladstone Grand Hotel | Category 2 | 43-49 Main Street, Fairlie | 1884 | 1984 | 3327 | The second hotel in Fairlie, it was built to capitalise on the recent Fairlie Branch railway. It became a common stop for tourists traveling to Mount Cook. A major extension was added to the hotel in 1916, with a smaller extension around the 1970s. | An old-fashioned two-storey hotel with a grey tile roof and tan walls | |
| Mt Nessing Homestead | Category 2 | 1031 Mt Nessing Road, Albury | 1862 | 1983 | 3143 | Also known as Opawa; a wooden homestead building near the Ōpaoa River. It was later converted into a bed and breakfast and event venue. Its gate (#1964) is listed separately. | | |
| Workshop | Category 2 | 1415 Tekapo-Twizel Road, Irishman Creek | —N/a | 1983 | 1973 | A workshop at Irishman Creek Industrial Historic Area (#7060) | | |
| Power House | Category 2 | 1415 Tekapo-Twizel Road, Irishman Creek | —N/a | 1983 | 1972 | A power house at Irishman Creek Industrial Historic Area (#7060) | | |
| Strathconan Gazebo | Category 2 | 144-146 Albury-Fairlie Road, Fairlie | —N/a | 1983 | 1971 | An outdoor gazebo on the Strathconan homestead; the building is listed separately (#1970) | | |
| Strathconan | Category 2 | 144-146 Albury-Fairlie Road, Fairlie | 1871–1877 | 1983 | 1970 | A concrete homestead building constructed in the 1870s. Its gazebo is listed separately (#1971). | | |
| Stone Shed (including former Stables, Bunkhouse and Cookhouse) | Category 2 | 110 Three Springs Road, Kimbell | —N/a | 1983 | 1969 | —N/a | | |
| Clayton Station Stables | Category 2 | 66 Lochaber Road, Fairlie | —N/a | 1983 | 1968 | A stables building constructed at the Clayton sheep station, which was established in the 1860s. The station's homestead is listed separately (#310). | | |
| St Patrick's Union Church | Category 1 | 2133 Fairlie-Tekapo Road, Burkes Pass | 1872 | 2003 | 1967 | A small timber church built for use by Anglicans, Presbyterians and Catholics (although only the first two are recorded to have used it). It is one of the oldest surviving buildings in the district. | A small wooden church in a grassy environment | |
| St David's Church (Anglican) | Category 2 | Middle Valley Rd, Raincliff | 1907 | 1983 | 1966 | A small wooden Anglican church built in 1907 | A white church in a grassy environment | |
| Ohau Road Bridge | Category 2 | Old Iron Bridge Road, Twizel | 1889 | 2004 | 1965 | A steel arch bridge spanning the Ōhau River. It was used by State Highway 8 until the 1970s, when the highway was rerouted by the formation of Lake Ruataniwha. | | |
| Mt Nessing Homestead Entrance Gate and Picket Fence | Category 2 | 1031 Mt Nessing Road, Albury | —N/a | 1983 | 1964 | The gate to the Mt Nessing Homestead (listed separately as #3143), also known as Opawa | | |
| Monavale School | Category 2 | Monavale Road, Cave | —N/a | 1983 | 1963 | —N/a | | |
| Miss Ada Taylor's House (Former) | Category 2 | 805 Cannington Road, Cave | —N/a | 1983 | 1962 | —N/a | | |
| Limestone House (John's) | Category 2 | 612 Monavale Road, Albury | —N/a | 1983 | 1961 | —N/a | | |
| Limestone House (former) | Category 2 | 805 Cannington Road, Cave | —N/a | 1983 | 1960 | —N/a | | |
| Butterworth Accommodation House (former) | Category 2 | 22 Butterworth Lane, Albury | —N/a | 1983 | 1959 | —N/a | | |
| Eversley Homestead | Category 2 | 89 Fairlie-Tekapo Road, Fairlie | 1876 | 1983 | 1958 | A homestead built in 1876 and expanded in 1888 | | |
| Cob Cottage (Alma Cottage) | Category 2 | 2033 Fairlie-Tekapo Road, Burkes Pass | 1876 | 1983 | 1957 | A cottage built from clay, tussock, and manure in 1876. The cottage property is protected by a heritage covenant. | | |
| Burnett Homestead Gates | Category 2 | 58 Burnetts Road, Cave | 1932–1933 | 2004 | 1956 | A pair of iron gates flanked by large bluestone pillars. Built during the Great Depression, one of their inscriptions reads "to keep minds and hands busy". They are similar in design to those of the nearby St. David's Church (#312). | | |
| Burke Memorial | Category 2 | Fairlie-Tekapo Road, Burkes Pass | 1917 | 1983 | 1955 | A monument erected in 1917 for Michael John Burke, who entered the pass in 1855 | A stone slab monument in a forested area | |
| St David's Pioneer Memorial Church | Category 1 | 47 Burnetts Road, Cave | 1930 | 1984 | 312 | A nondenominational Christian church built in honour of Mount Cook station runholders Andrew and Catherine Burnett. It is a stone and concrete structure designed in a Norman style by Timaru architect Herbert Hall. | A small stone church on a grassy hillside | |
| Church of the Good Shepherd | Category 1 | Pioneer Drive, Lake Tekapo | 1935 | 1985 | 311 | A small stone church designed by R. S. D. Harman based on a model and drawings by painter Esther Hope. Its design is inspired by traditional Gothic architecture, and features stone carvings by Frederick Gurnsey. | A small stone church by a lake surrounded by a large grassy area with some boulders | |
| Clayton Homestead | Category 1 | 66 Lochaber Road, Fairlie | late 1860s–early 1870s | 1984 | 310 | The Clayton sheep station was established as two runs in the early 1860s. A two-storey stone homestead was built on the property in the late 1860s and early 1870s. Various additions were added to the structure over the late 19th and 20th centuries. | | |
| Ashwick Station Stable Ruins | Category 2 | 897 Monument Road, Ashwick Flat, Fairlie | —N/a | 1984 | 185 | —N/a | | |

== Former sites ==
One site in Mackenzie District was formerly listed on the New Zealand Heritage List but has since been destroyed.

Former historic places in Mackenzie District
| Name | Classification | Location | Constructed | Registered | List number | Notes | Ref. |
|---|---|---|---|---|---|---|---|
| War Memorial, Fairlie | Category 2 | Fairlie | 1929 | —N/a | 1811 | A war memorial built in the 1920s, it was decommissioned in 1999 and replaced with a new stone memorial. The plaques from the original memorial were reused in the new construction. | |
