= Kimbell, New Zealand =

Town in the South Island of New Zealand

Kimbell
- Township
- Interactive map of Kimbell
- Coordinates: 44°02′45″S 170°45′30″E
- Country: New Zealand
- Region: Canterbury
- Territorial authority: Mackenzie District
- Ward: Opuha Ward
- Community: Fairlie Community
- Electorates: Waitaki; Te Tai Tonga (Māori)

Government
  - Territorial authority: Mackenzie District Council
  - Regional council: Environment Canterbury
  - Mayor of Mackenzie: Scott Aronsen
  - Waitaki MP: Miles Anderson
  - Te Tai Tonga MP: Mananui Ramsden

Area
  - Total: 36.06 km^{2} (13.92 sq mi)

Population (2023 census)
  - Total: 138
  - Density: 3.83/km^{2} (9.91/sq mi)
- Local iwi: Ngāi Tahu
- Website: Mackenzie District Council

Kimbell is a small township in New Zealand's Mackenzie District, 9 kilometres (5.6 mi) northwest of Fairlie. It is located on SH 8, not far from Burkes Pass, and is a 20 kilometres (12 mi) drive from Mount Dobson ski field. Kimbell was named after Frederick J. Kimbell, who purchased the nearby Three Springs farm in 1866.

== Demographics ==
Kimbell locality covers 36.06 km^{2} (13.92 sq mi). It is part of the Opua statistical area.

Historical population
| Year | Pop. | ±% p.a. |
|---|---|---|
| 2006 | 90 | — |
| 2013 | 108 | +2.64% |
| 2018 | 141 | +5.48% |
| 2023 | 138 | −0.43% |

Kimbell had a population of 138 in the 2023 New Zealand census, a decrease of 3 people (−2.1%) since the 2018 census, and an increase of 30 people (27.8%) since the 2013 census. There were 75 males and 63 females in 57 dwellings. 2.2% of people identified as LGBTIQ+. The median age was 47.5 years (compared with 38.1 years nationally). There were 27 people (19.6%) aged under 15 years, 18 (13.0%) aged 15 to 29, 63 (45.7%) aged 30 to 64, and 30 (21.7%) aged 65 or older.

People could identify as more than one ethnicity. The results were 95.7% European (Pākehā), 10.9% Māori, 2.2% Pasifika, and 8.7% other, which includes people giving their ethnicity as "New Zealander". English was spoken by 97.8%, Māori by 2.2%, and other languages by 8.7%. No language could be spoken by 2.2% (e.g. too young to talk). The percentage of people born overseas was 13.0, compared with 28.8% nationally.

The sole religious affiliation given was 32.6% Christian. People who answered that they had no religion were 52.2%, and 15.2% of people did not answer the census question.

Of those at least 15 years old, 21 (18.9%) people had a bachelor's or higher degree, 72 (64.9%) had a post-high school certificate or diploma, and 18 (16.2%) people exclusively held high school qualifications. The median income was $44,500, compared with $41,500 nationally. 15 people (13.5%) earned over $100,000 compared to 12.1% nationally. The employment status of those at least 15 was 66 (59.5%) full-time, 9 (8.1%) part-time, and 3 (2.7%) unemployed.

== Fairlie Peace Avenue ==
Kimbell is the start of the Fairlie Peace Avenue. This is made up of 500 oak trees which were planted to commemorate the signing of the Treaty of Versailles, which ended World War I. Five trees were removed after being damaged by high winds during Easter 2021. All of the trees (97%) were deemed to require some work in 2021. The priority was the removal of trees that had broken branches were unstable or had heavy dead wood that could fall on people or cars.

== Notable buildings ==
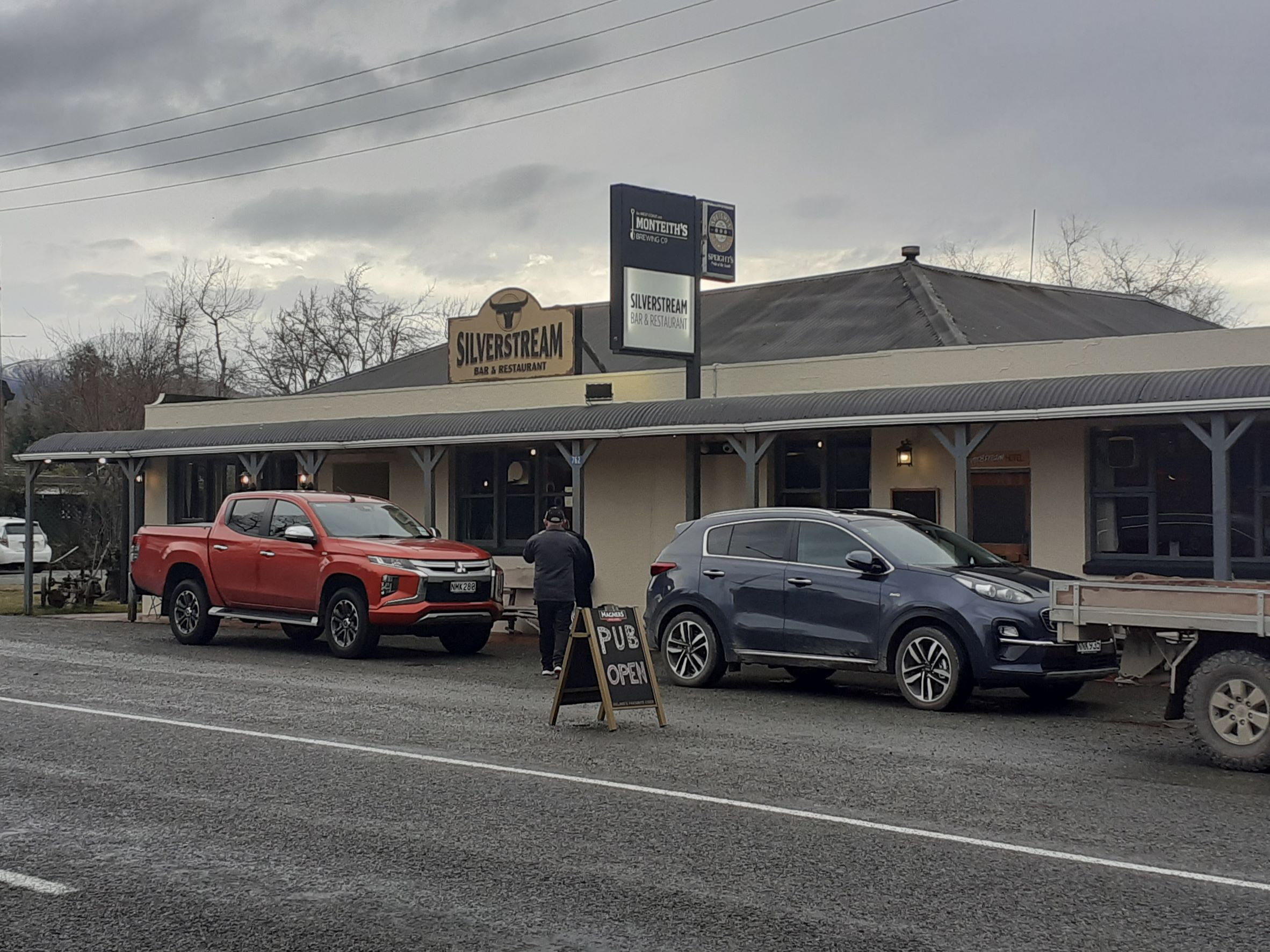
Silverstream Hotel, Kimbell. Built in 1877

Kimbell is also home to the Silverstream Hotel, which was built in 1877, and is known as the 'new stone hotel'.

The former post office, Walnut Cottage, is a Historic Place Category 2 listed building. It is situated next to the Silverstream Hotel. It was built in 1878 from local limestone by T. Foden; stonemason F. Brehaut also was involved in its construction.

It is home to the Garage Gallery, an art gallery located in a former engineering garage.
