= Church of the Good Shepherd, Lake Tekapo =

Church of the Good Shepherd
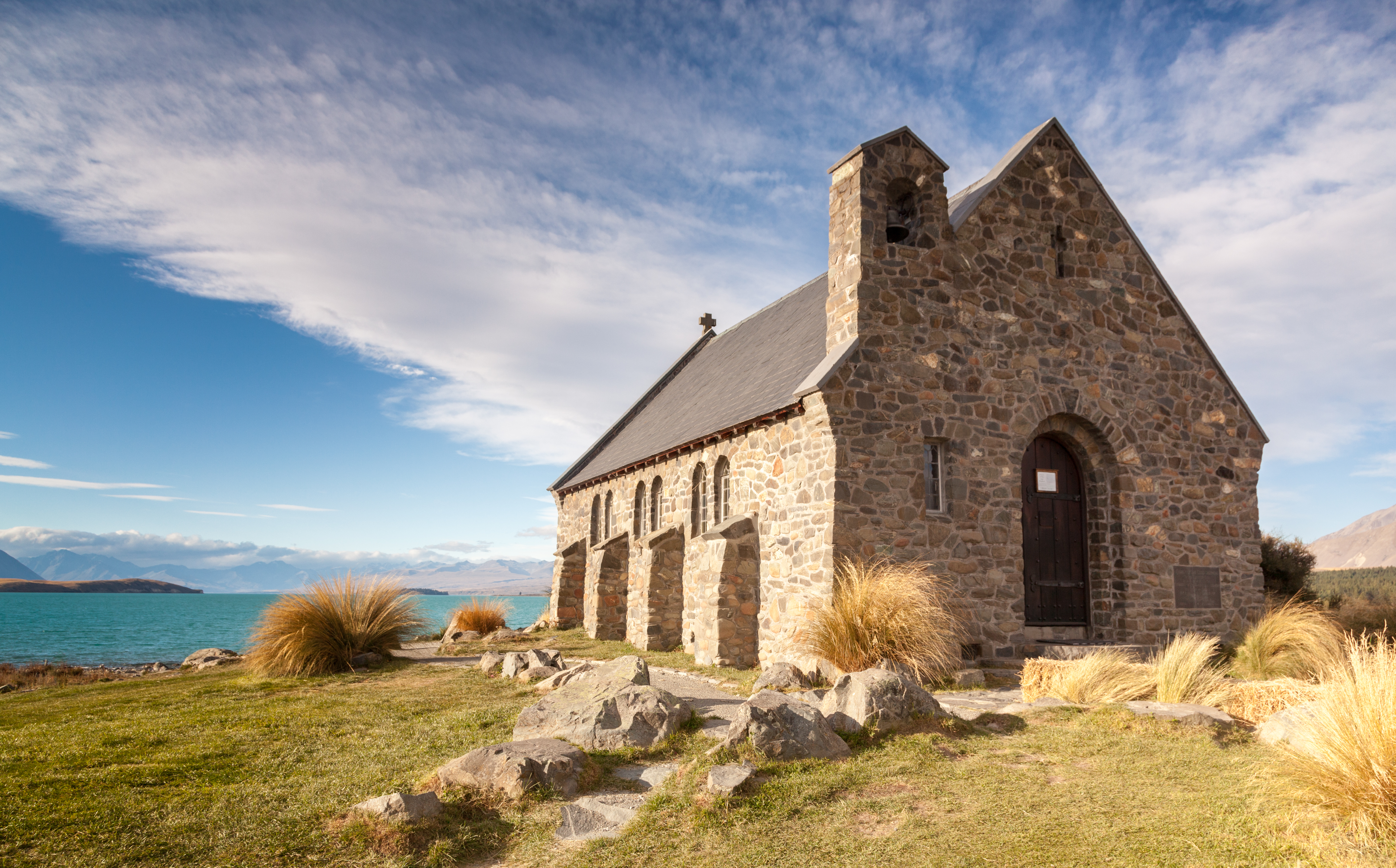
- Church of the Good Shepherd with Lake Tekapo and the Southern Alps as a backdrop
- Church of the Good Shepherd
- 44°00′12″S 170°28′57″E
- Location: Pioneer Drive, Lake Tekapo, Mackenzie District
- Country: New Zealand
- Denomination: Interdenominational
- Website: Official website

History
- Status: Parish church
- Consecrated: 3 August 1935

Architecture
- Functional status: Active
- Architect: Richard Strachan De Renzy Harman

Specifications
- Materials: Concrete faced with stones

Heritage New Zealand – Category 1
- Designated: 5 September 1985
- Reference no.: 311

The Church of the Good Shepherd on the shores of Lake Tekapo on the South Island of New Zealand is a small Anglican church used by various denominations. Built in 1935 as a memorial church to commemorate early settlers, it is one of the most photographed buildings in the country. It has a Category I heritage registration by Heritage New Zealand.

== Background ==
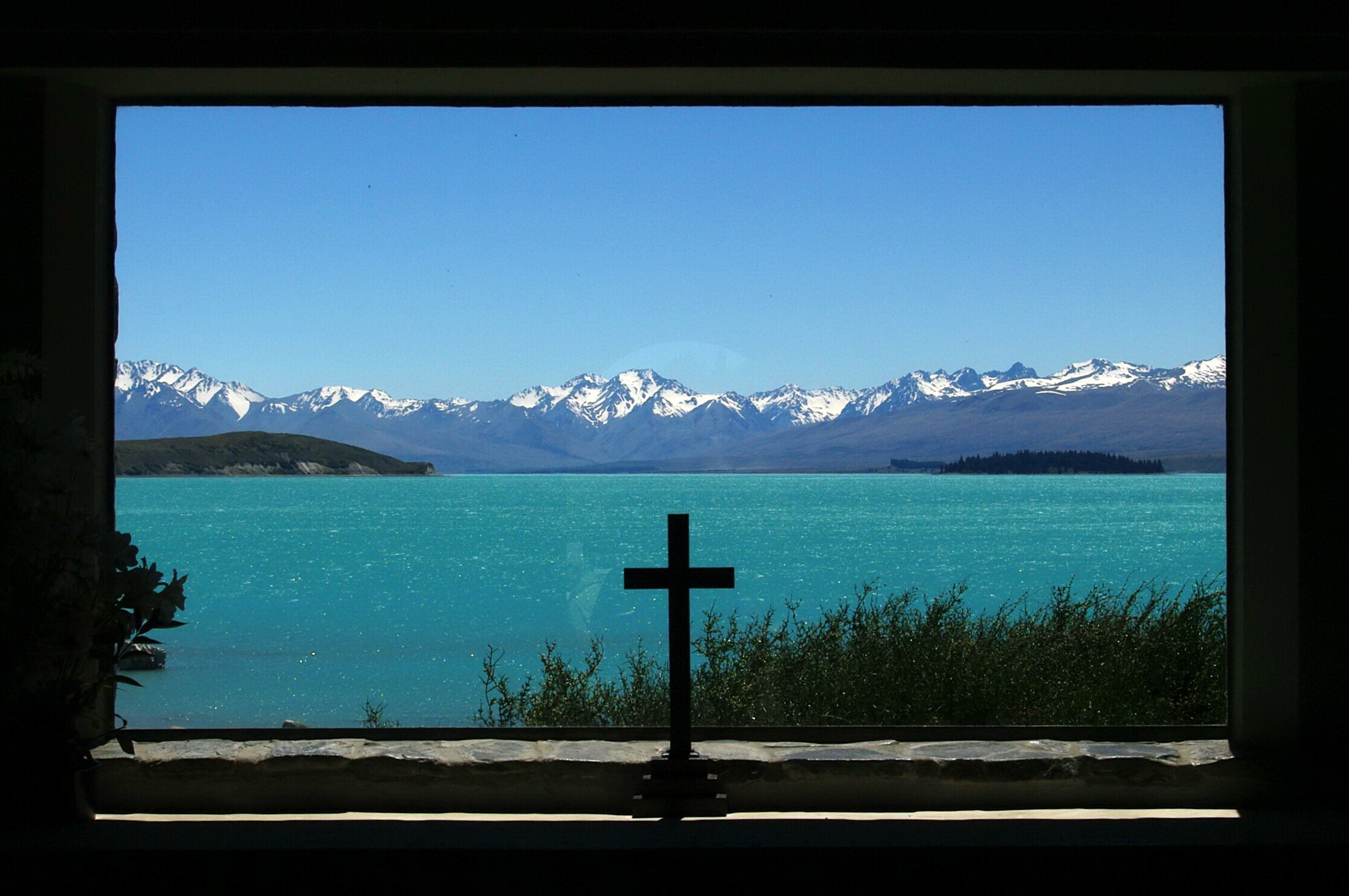
View from within the church

Walter Ernest Detheridge Davies became the vicar of Fairlie in February 1933. The Fairlie cure extended up to Mount Cook Village and Davies realised that the Mackenzie Basin needed its own church; he first suggested this to parishioners in September 1933. Davies also suggested that a large window should be incorporated so that there would be a view from within the church of the lake, based on the 1930 design of St James Church at Franz Josef on the West Coast. The idea was taken up by various local runholders who thought that it would be an appropriate way of acknowledging and commemorating their pioneering ancestors. The land for the building was given by the owners of Braemar Station, which is (mostly) located on the eastern shore of Lake Tekapo. A generous amount of land belongs to the church so that the building will continue to be sited on its own. Esther Hope, a local artist from Grampians Station, provided sketch designs for the proposed church. The Christchurch architect Richard Strachan De Renzy Harman (1896–1953) based his 1933/1934 design on Hope's drawings.

== Construction ==
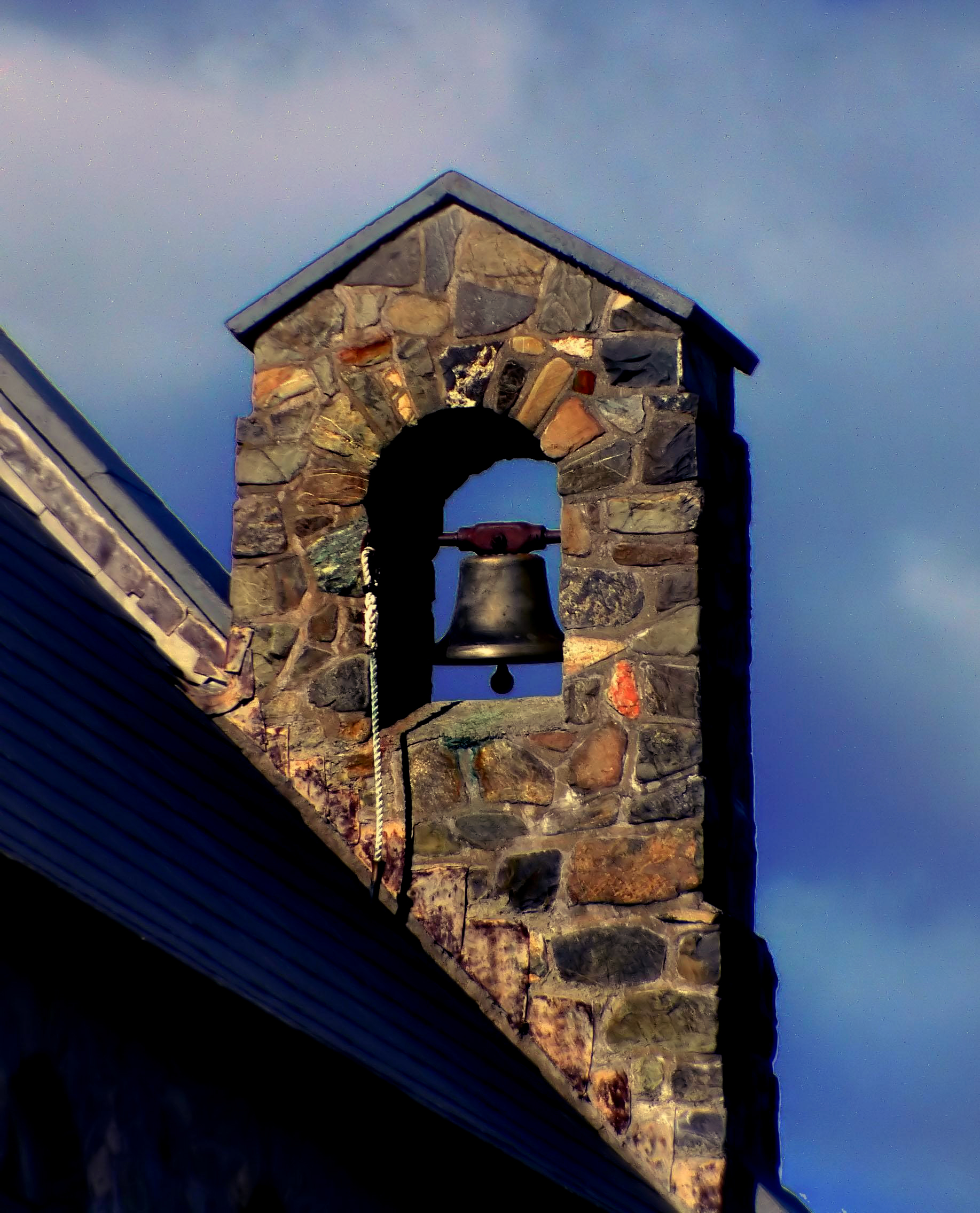
The bell commemorates Audrey Barker (died 1935) and her grandfather Edward Sealy

The foundation stone for the church was laid by Prince Henry, Duke of Gloucester, on 16 January 1935, in the presence of the bishop of Christchurch, Campbell West-Watson, and vicar Davies. The building committee had decided that the church should blend into the environment. The grounds surrounding the church were deliberately left with their native vegetation. The church was clad in local stone and lichen was left on the stone to give it a natural look. The structure itself was made from concrete, with the stones as cladding. Fred Trott won the construction tender, but the work was carried out by Les Loomes and Doug Rodman; the latter was engaged to Trott's daughter. The stonework was done by Christchurch stonemason Jack Miller. A Christchurch firm installed the hardwood shingles. Audrey Barker had died in February 1935 aged 21, and the Barker and Sealy families donated the bell for the church, commemorating both Audrey Barker and her grandfather, Edward Sealy, who had explored many of the glaciers in the area during the 1860s. The bell was cast in Christchurch by W. H. Price and Son Ltd. The dedication ceremony was held on 3 August 1935 by the Bishop of Christchurch.

Even before the church was finished, The Press in Christchurch commented:

The whole effect of the little church is striking and has won the admiration of all who have seen it.

— The Press staff writer, 26 July 1935 article

== History ==
Rodman, one of the two builders, was the first person to get married at the church. On 14 December 1935, he married Peggy Trott.

The Australian oak shingles did not last in the harsh climate of the Mackenzie Basin and in 1957, the roof was covered with slate shingles instead.

On 5 September 1985, the building was registered by the New Zealand Historic Places Trust (now Heritage New Zealand) as a Category I structure, with register number 311. The Church of the Good Shepherd is one of the most photographed buildings in New Zealand; photography within the building is no longer permitted as it interfered with worship.

In late 2017, a fence was installed around the church grounds after "damage to the environment around the church, verbal abuse of staff, and tourists interrupting the church services". Access is granted during daytime hours.

As of 2018, the local vicar estimates that 600,000 people visit the church per year.

== See also ==
- List of historic places in Mackenzie District
