= Fairlie Bakehouse =

Bakery in Fairlie, New Zealand

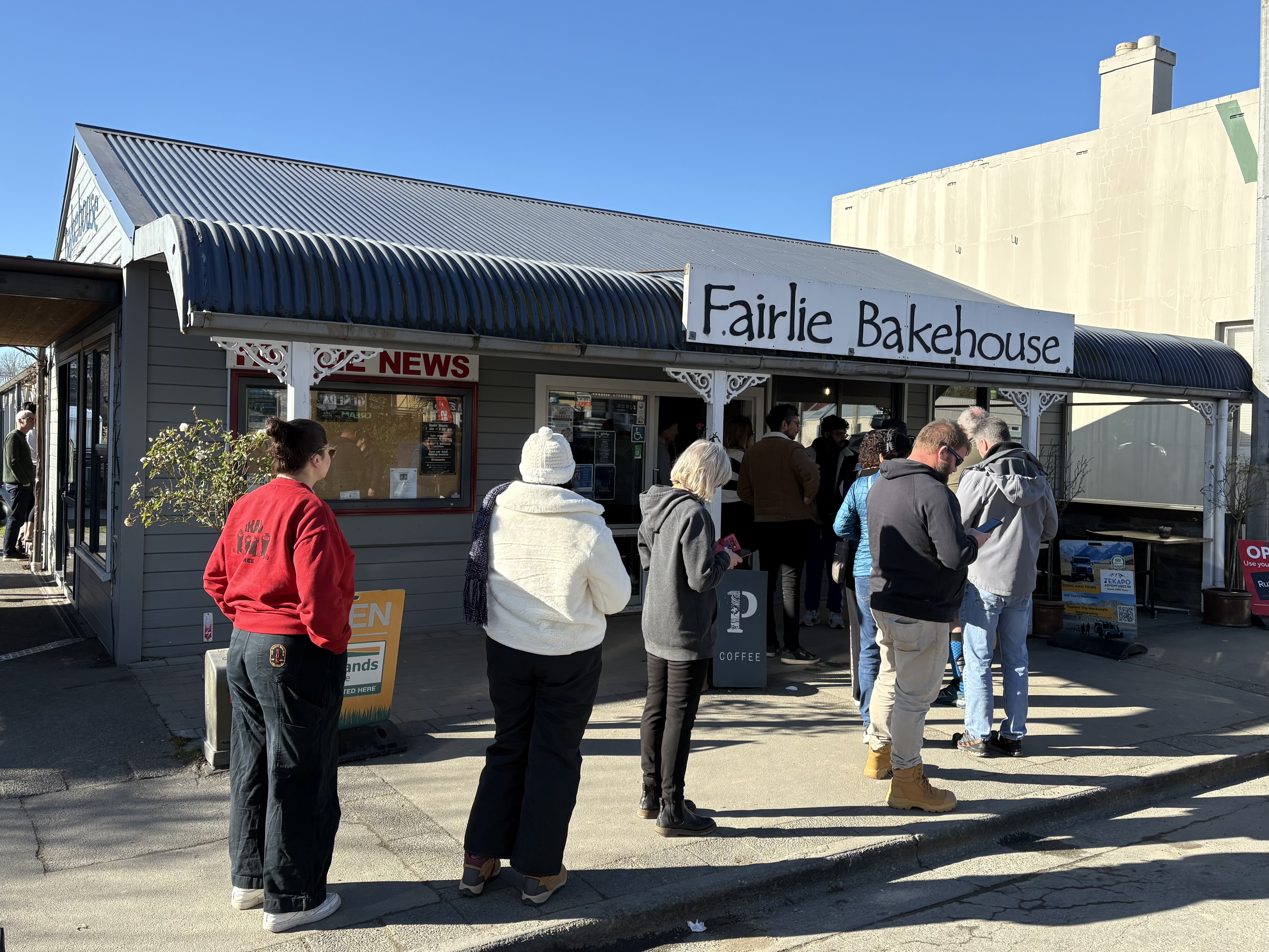
- The bakery in July 2025

Restaurant information
- Established: 2010
- Owner: Franz Lieber
- Food type: Baked goods
- Location: 74 Main Street, Fairlie, New Zealand
- Website: www.fairliebakehouse.co.nz

The Fairlie Bakehouse is a bakery in Fairlie, New Zealand. The bakery is most famous for producing gourmet meat pies. Popular varieties include salmon and bacon, venison and cranberry, and steak. Their most popular variety is a pork belly and apple sauce pie, with a piece of crackling on the top.

The bakery was opened in 2010 by Austrian-born chef Franz Lieber. As of 2020, at peak the bakery produces around 2500 pies a day, and uses 6 tonnes (13,000 lb) of pork a month. Pies are sold from the premises, and are also sold wholesale to supermarkets around the South Island. The bakery has become a popular stopping place for travellers on the road between Lake Tekapo and Timaru, in part due to positive reviews on tourism review website Tripadvisor.

In 2014 the bakery produced a "ram pie" (made with lamb) to celebrate the Mackenzie Rugby Club making it to the semifinals of the Hamersley trophy competition.

The business won the People's Choice Award from the South Canterbury Chamber of Commerce in 2012, 2013, 2015 and 2018, and a regional hospitality industry award in 2013. In 2024 Fairlie Bakehouse pies were used in a pie-eating contest by the Aoraki Foundation. In 2024, the bakery won two categories at the New Zealand vegan pie awards.

The bakery has never won an award at the Bakel's New Zealand Pie Awards. Owner Franz Lieber has previously declined to enter the competition due to a perception that South Island bakeries are at a disadvantage. The bakery entered a lamb pie in 2025, but it did not place in the competition.

The bakery employs 65 staff in Fairlie, which has a population of under 1000.
