= Georgina Jane Burgess =

New Zealand hotel-keeper, midwife, postmistress

Georgina Jane Burgess (c. 1841 – 10 January 1904) was a New Zealand hotel-keeper, midwife and postmistress.

== Biography ==
She was born in Edinburgh, Midlothian, Scotland in c. 1841.

She managed the hotel in Burkes Pass from 1861 onward and also served as its postmaster in 1890–94, in addition to being the local midwife. She is a known figure in the local colonial history.
