= Alfred Barker (doctor) =

New Zealand doctor and photographer

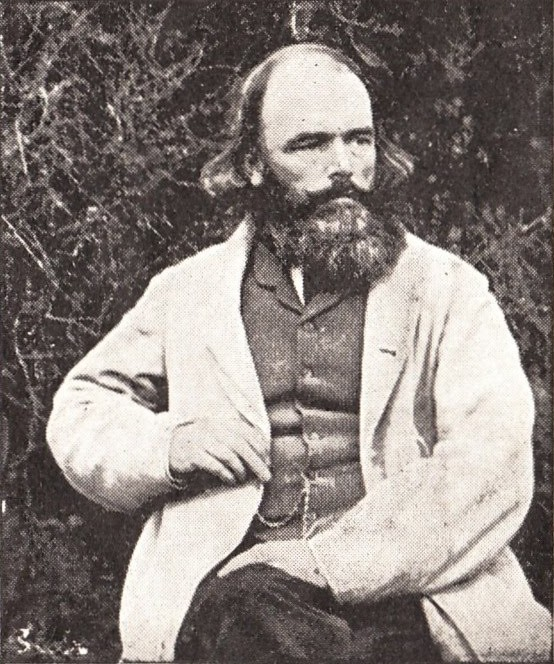
- Born: Alfred Charles Barker; 5 January 1819; Hackney, London, England
- Died: 20 March 1873 (aged 54); Christchurch, New Zealand
- Other name: Syphax
- Occupations: Doctor, Photographer
- Relatives: Esther Hope (granddaughter)

Alfred Charles Barker (1819–1873) was a New Zealand medical doctor and photographer.

Barker was born on 5 January 1819 at Hackney, London in England. Barker was the fifth child of Joseph Gibbs Barker and Sarah Pritchett Bousfield. He studied medicine at King's College, London. He and his wife Emma (née Bacon) arrived at Lyttelton on the Charlotte Jane on 16 December 1850 and settled in Christchurch, where they had five children.

He was registrar of Births, Deaths and Marriages in Christchurch from 1854 until 1866 although he had given up his medical practice by 1859 as a result of a horse riding injury. His medical practice was sufficiently lucrative to allow him to retire from medicine at the age of 39. He owned a sheep station at Lake Coleridge and was a photographer, artist, architect, amateur geologist and botanist.

He established himself as a prominent photographer in Christchurch documenting life in the city and its citizens.

Barker died on 20 March 1873 and was buried in the Barbadoes Street Cemetery.

Barker's photos are held in the Canterbury Museum.
