= Esther Hope =

New Zealand artist

Esther Studholme Hope
- Born: Esther Studholme Barker; 8 August 1885; Woodbury, New Zealand
- Died: 16 July 1975 (aged 89); Timaru, New Zealand
- Education: Slade School of Fine Art, Chelsea College of Arts
- Known for: Painting
- Spouse: Henry Norman Hope
- Relatives: Alfred Barker (grandfather); Michael Studholme (grandfather); John Studholme (great-uncle)

Esther Studholme Hope (née Barker, 8 August 1885 – 16 July 1975) was a New Zealand artist.

== Background ==
Hope was born in Woodbury, New Zealand, on 8 August 1885. Her father was the farmer John Matthias Barker (1856–1933), the son of Dr Alfred Barker (1819–1873). Her grandfather, while trained as a doctor, was prominent as a photographer in colonial Christchurch. Her mother was Emily Studholme (1863–1938), the daughter of the pioneering runholder Michael Studholme (1833–1886).

Barker married Henry Norman Hope on 26 May 1920 at Woodbury, and died on 16 July 1975.

== Education ==
Hope's early education was at Miss Bowen's School in Christchurch. Her first art teachers included Captain Edwyn Temple and Margaret Stoddart. After travelling to England, Hope's art education included attending the Slade School of Fine Art in London, receiving tuition from Henry Tonks, John Peter Russell, and Ambrose McEvoy. While in London she also studied at the Chelsea College of Arts under Ernest Borough Johnson and Frank Spenlove-Spenlove.

== Career ==
Hope is known for her watercolour paintings, specifically gouaches of Mackenzie Country.

After completing her art education, Hope travelled around several European countries to paint. While in Brittany, World War I began and she was unable to return to England. Following her return she drove trucks between London docks and the city, before travelling to Malta to become a Voluntary Aid Detachment (VAD). She returned to New Zealand in 1919 and began exhibiting her work there from 1920. After it had been decided to build a church at Lake Tekapo, Hope prepared some sketches for a church building in 1933 and these were given to an architect in Christchurch. The Church of the Good Shepherd opened in 1935.

Internationally she exhibited at the Royal Academy of Arts, the Salon in Paris, the Royal Institute of Painters in Watercolour, and the Royal Scottish Society of Painters in Watercolour. In New Zealand Hope exhibited with:

- Auckland Society of Arts
- Canterbury Society of Arts between 1930–1950
- South Canterbury Arts Society in 1910 (including receiving first prize), 1920, 1953–1964
- New Zealand Academy of Fine Arts between 1933–1965
- Otago Art Society
- and at the New Zealand and South Seas International Exhibition, Dunedin, 1925–1926

She was represented by the several New Zealand galleries including: Robert McDougall Art Gallery, Dunedin Public Art Gallery, and Aigantighe Art Gallery in Timaru.

Her work is held in the collection of the Christchurch Art Gallery Te Puna o Waiwhetu and the Museum of New Zealand Te Papa Tongarewa.
