= Woodbury, New Zealand =

Woodbury
- Rural settlement
- Interactive map of Woodbury
- Coordinates: 44°02′S 171°12′E
- Country: New Zealand
- Region: Canterbury
- Territorial authority: Timaru District
- Ward: Geraldine
- Community: Geraldine
- Electorates: Waitaki; Te Tai Tonga (Māori)

Government
  - Territorial authority: Timaru District Council
  - Regional council: Environment Canterbury
  - Mayor of Timaru: Nigel Bowen
  - Waitaki MP: Miles Anderson
  - Te Tai Tonga MP: Tākuta Ferris

Area
  - Total: 0.26 km^{2} (0.10 sq mi)

Population (June 2025)
  - Total: 120
  - Density: 460/km^{2} (1,200/sq mi)

Woodbury is a small township in the Canterbury Region in the South Island of New Zealand. It is about 8 kilometres (5.0 mi) inland from Geraldine and is the gateway to the nearby Waihī and Orari River Gorges and the Four Peaks. The township is home to various small local businesses.

== History ==
The early history of Woodbury is centred around the timber industry and farming. The town was first established by Robert Taylor and Frederick Flatman in 1866 as a saw milling and farming settlement. The town enjoyed rapid growth in its early years and was home to a large general store, two butchers shops, a shoemaker, a creamery, a blacksmith and a two-storeyed wooden hotel, that would later blow down in a gale.

The settlement was originally known as Waihi Bush, however, was renamed Woodbury after the birthplace Elizabeth Flatman (Frederick Flatman's wife) in Gloucestershire, England.

== Demographics ==
The area is described as a rural settlement by Statistics New Zealand, and covers 0.26 km^{2} (0.10 sq mi). It had an estimated population of 120 as of June 2025, with a population density of 462 people per km^{2}. Woodbury is part of the larger Arundel statistical area.

Historical population
Year	Pop.	±% p.a.
2006	96	—
2013	96	+0.00%
2018	105	+1.81%
2023	117	+2.19%

Woodbury had a population of 117 in the 2023 New Zealand census, an increase of 12 people (11.4%) since the 2018 census, and an increase of 21 people (21.9%) since the 2013 census. There were 63 males and 54 females in 51 dwellings. The median age was 43.2 years (compared with 38.1 years nationally). There were 27 people (23.1%) aged under 15 years, 12 (10.3%) aged 15 to 29, 51 (43.6%) aged 30 to 64, and 27 (23.1%) aged 65 or older.

People could identify as more than one ethnicity. The results were 94.9% European (Pākehā); 10.3% Māori; 2.6% Asian; and 2.6% Middle Eastern, Latin American and African New Zealanders (MELAA). English was spoken by 97.4%, and other languages by 10.3%. No language could be spoken by 2.6% (e.g. too young to talk). The percentage of people born overseas was 25.6, compared with 28.8% nationally.

The sole religious affiliation given was 30.8% Christian. People who answered that they had no religion were 61.5%, and 7.7% of people did not answer the census question.

Of those at least 15 years old, 18 (20.0%) people had a bachelor's or higher degree, 51 (56.7%) had a post-high school certificate or diploma, and 18 (20.0%) people exclusively held high school qualifications. The median income was $38,700, compared with $41,500 nationally. 3 people (3.3%) earned over $100,000 compared to 12.1% nationally. The employment status of those at least 15 was 45 (50.0%) full-time and 18 (20.0%) part-time.

== Education ==
The original Waihi Bush school was opened in 1872, the school would later be moved to its current location and renamed in 1881. Woodbury school continues to operate today as a four teacher contributing primary school serving years 1 to 6, with a roll of 115 students as of July 2026. The school's principal is Mike De Joux.

== Buildings ==
=== Eleanor Tripp Library ===
A small wooden library built as a memorial to Eleanor Tripp is still run by locals today and doubles as a museum. Outside the library is the area War Memorial.

=== St Thomas's Church ===
The original wooden church was consecrated in 1879, however population growth in the region ensured that a new, larger church was needed. The church was rebuilt by Oswald Scott and Bert Cooling using Norman styling and stones from the local river, it was completed in 1938. The interior of the church features stained glass windows made by Veronica Whall, Joseph Nuttgens and Stephen Bélanger-Taylor as well as carving by Frederick Gurnsey. The church is still used today for services and is a popular wedding location.

=== Woodbury Domain ===
Land was reserved for the domain in 1883 and the Woodbury Hall was built in 1911 in celebration of the coronation of King George V. The domain consists of a cricket pavilion, tennis courts, children's playground, public toilets and BBQ. Adjacent to the domain is the cemetery that has been used since 1879.

== Notable residents ==
- Esther Studholme Hope (née Baker, 1885–1975), New Zealand painter
