= Burkes Pass =

Mountain pass and small town in South Canterbury, New Zealand

- Interactive map of Burkes Pass
- Elevation: 709 metres (2,326 ft)
- Traversed by: State Highway 8

Third Approach
- Location: New Zealand
- Range: Two Thumb Range
- Coordinates: 44°05′25″S 170°36′00″E
- Topo map: NZ Topo Map

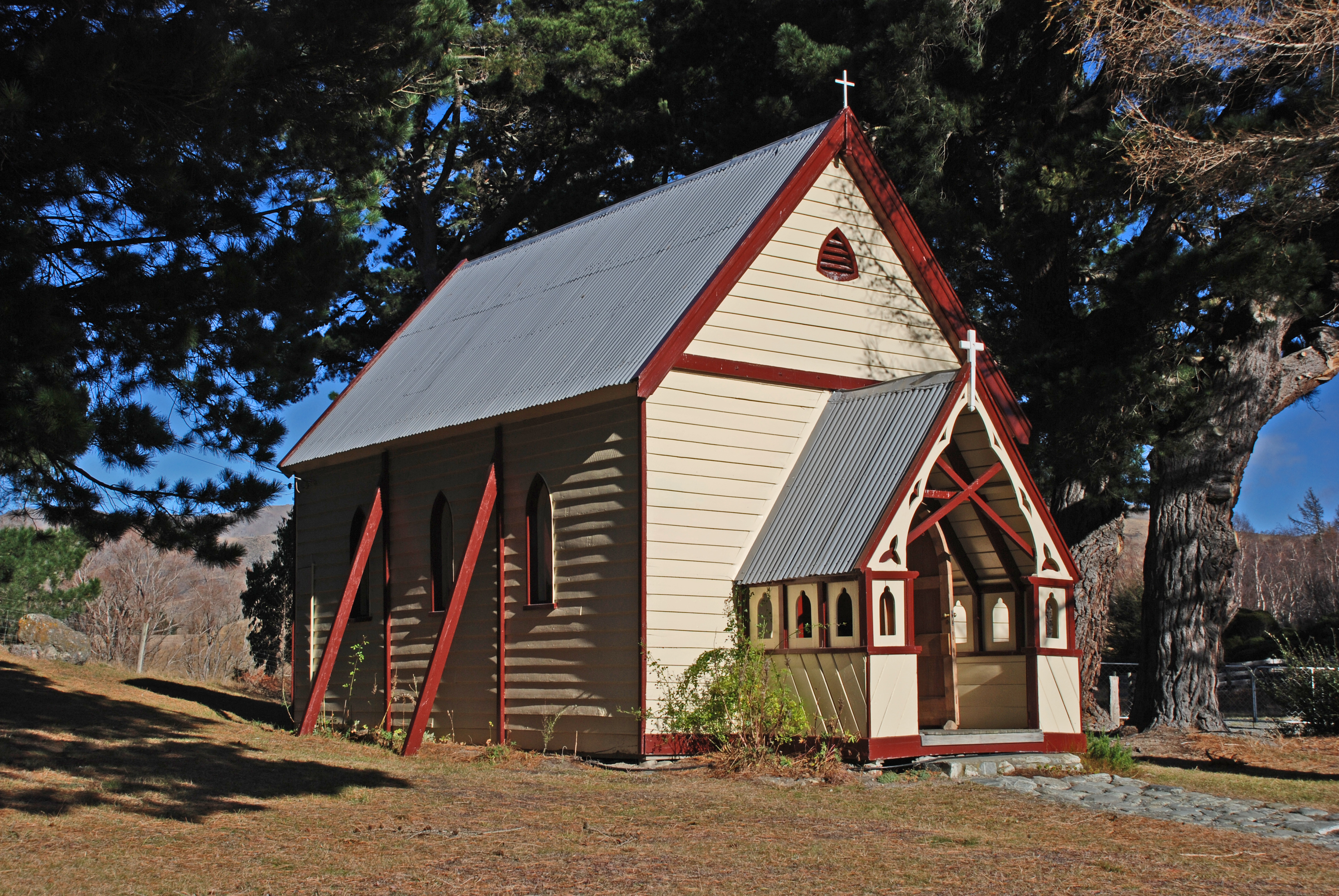
St. Patrick's Church, Burkes Pass, Canterbury 2007

Burkes Pass is a mountain pass and at its base, a small town on State Highway 8 at the entrance to the Mackenzie Country in South Canterbury, New Zealand. It is named after Michael John Burke (1812 Co. Galway-1869 Ballarat), a graduate of Trinity College Dublin, who drove a team of bullocks through the passageway which leads up into the Mackenzie Country in 1855. This was an alternative route to the Mackenzie Pass, which the notorious alleged sheep stealer, James Mckenzie, had used to take his sheep into the Otago goldfields. Burkes Pass separates the Two Thumb Range to the north from the Rollesby and Albury ranges to the south, and sits at an altitude of 709 metres (2,326 ft). A memorial to Burke stands close to the pass's saddle.

Burke may not have been the first European to cross the Pass called after him. G Dunnage camped in the vicinity in 1855 before the geographical features were named.

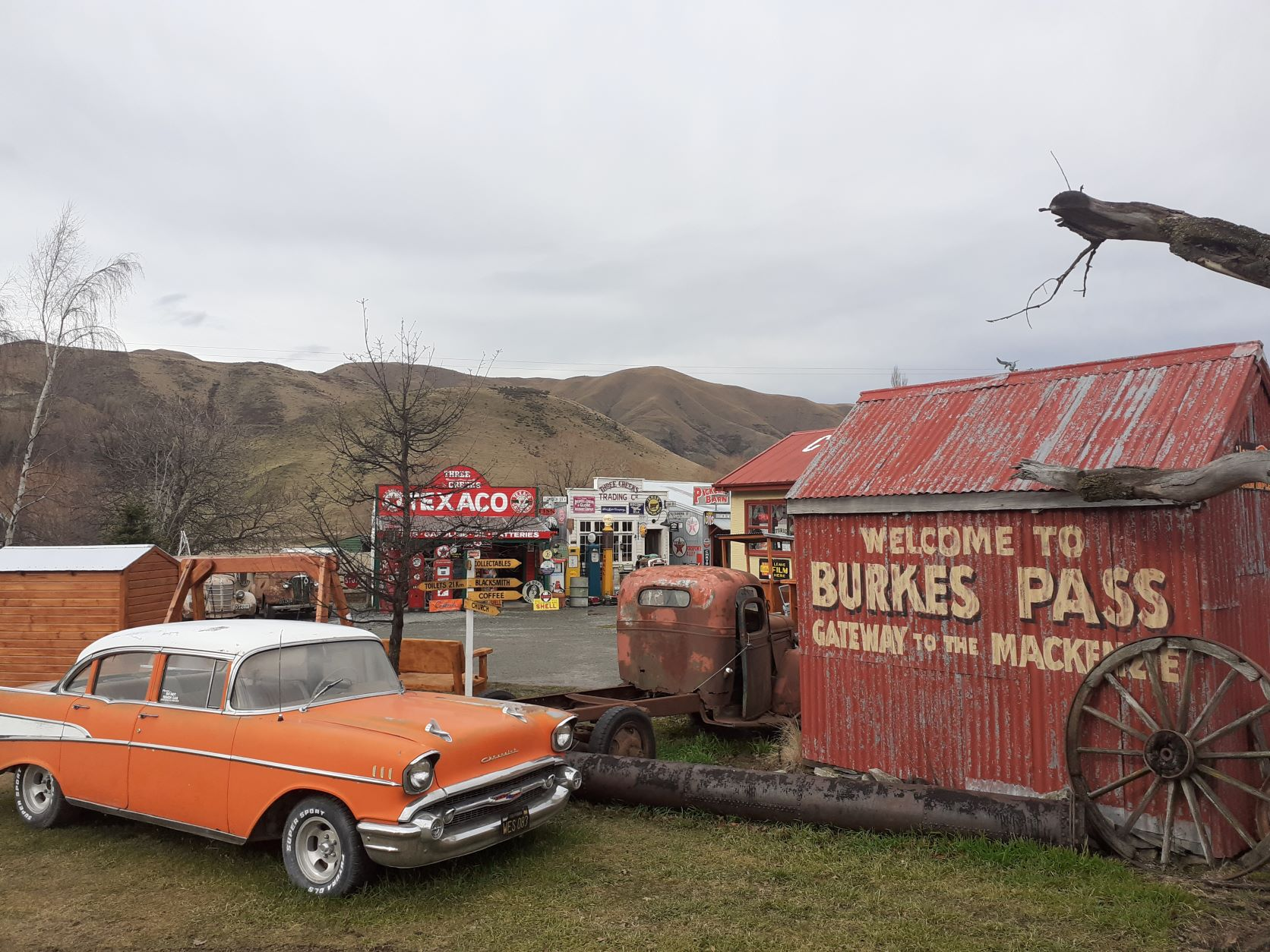
Burkes Pass (July 2021)

A dray track was cut through Burkes Pass in 1857–58. Settlers and bullock teams soon found The Long Cutting was the easier of the two passageways to negotiate, becoming the main thoroughfare for travellers in to the Mackenzie, a vast land known by Māori for its plentiful supply of wekas on the plains and eels in the streams and lakes. With travel slow and arduous, the need for a resting place for weary travellers soon became evident.

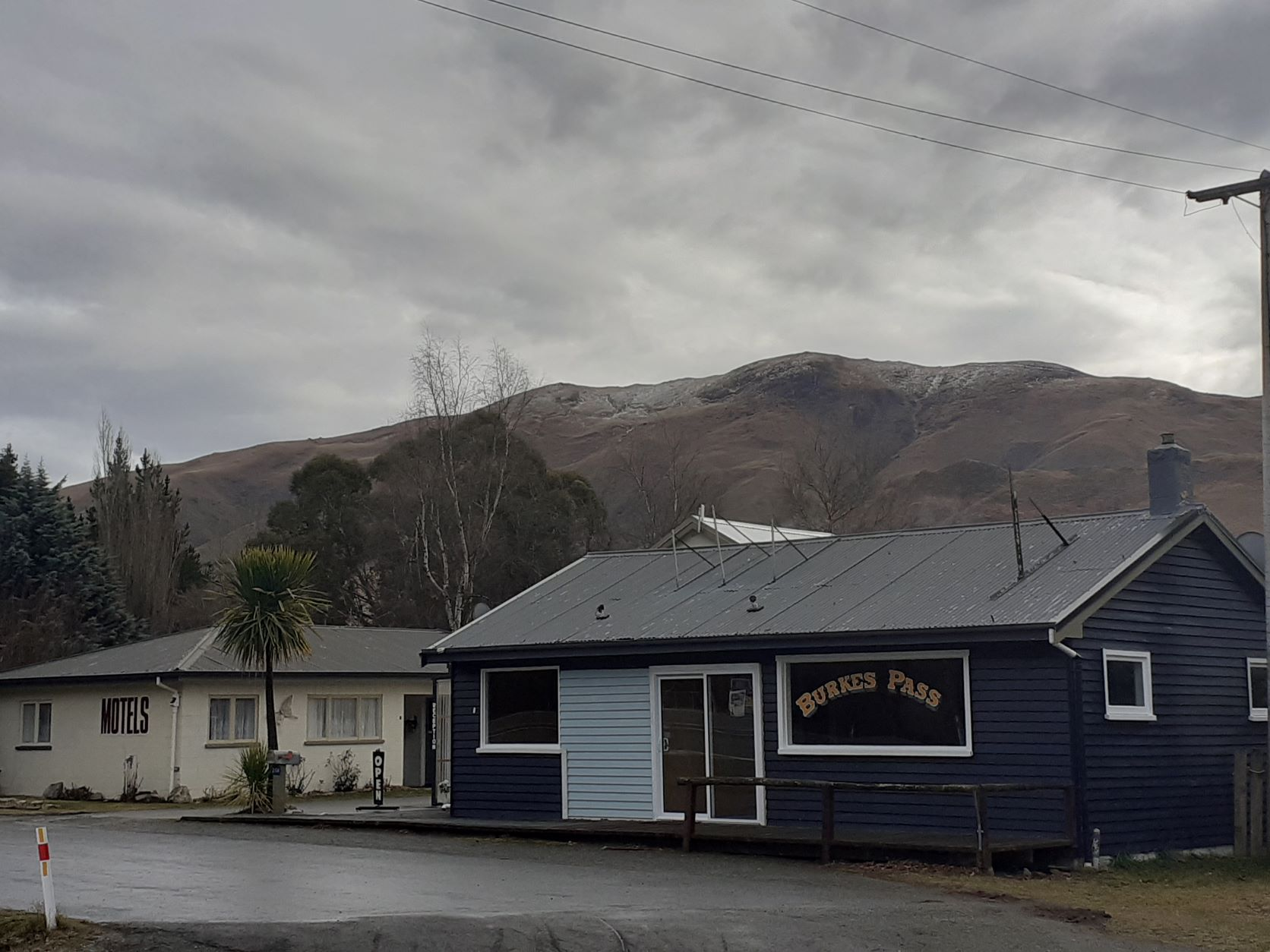
Burkes Pass (July 2021)

A 640-acre (2.6 km^{2}) site, on the west side of the top of The Long Cutting, was set aside in 1859 to establish a central depot for coal, wood, and food supplies. It was a bleak, exposed site, between Sterickers Mound, near Sawdon Creek, and the foot of the spur from Mount Burgess. James Noonan<South Canterbury- A Record of Settlement, O.A Gillespie, 1958 p 280> ignored the official township site building the first hotel in 1861 at Cabbage Tree Creek in the valley behind where the remains of the hotel built in 1869 are today.

A town, first known as Cabbage Tree Creek, then Clulee, and finally Burkes Pass, sprang up around the hotel. For more than half a century a colourful cavalcade passed through the town, Burkes Pass becoming the social, business, and sporting centre for the Mackenzie Country pioneers. Its heyday was 1890 to 1910 when there was a population of 143 and a three-teacher school.

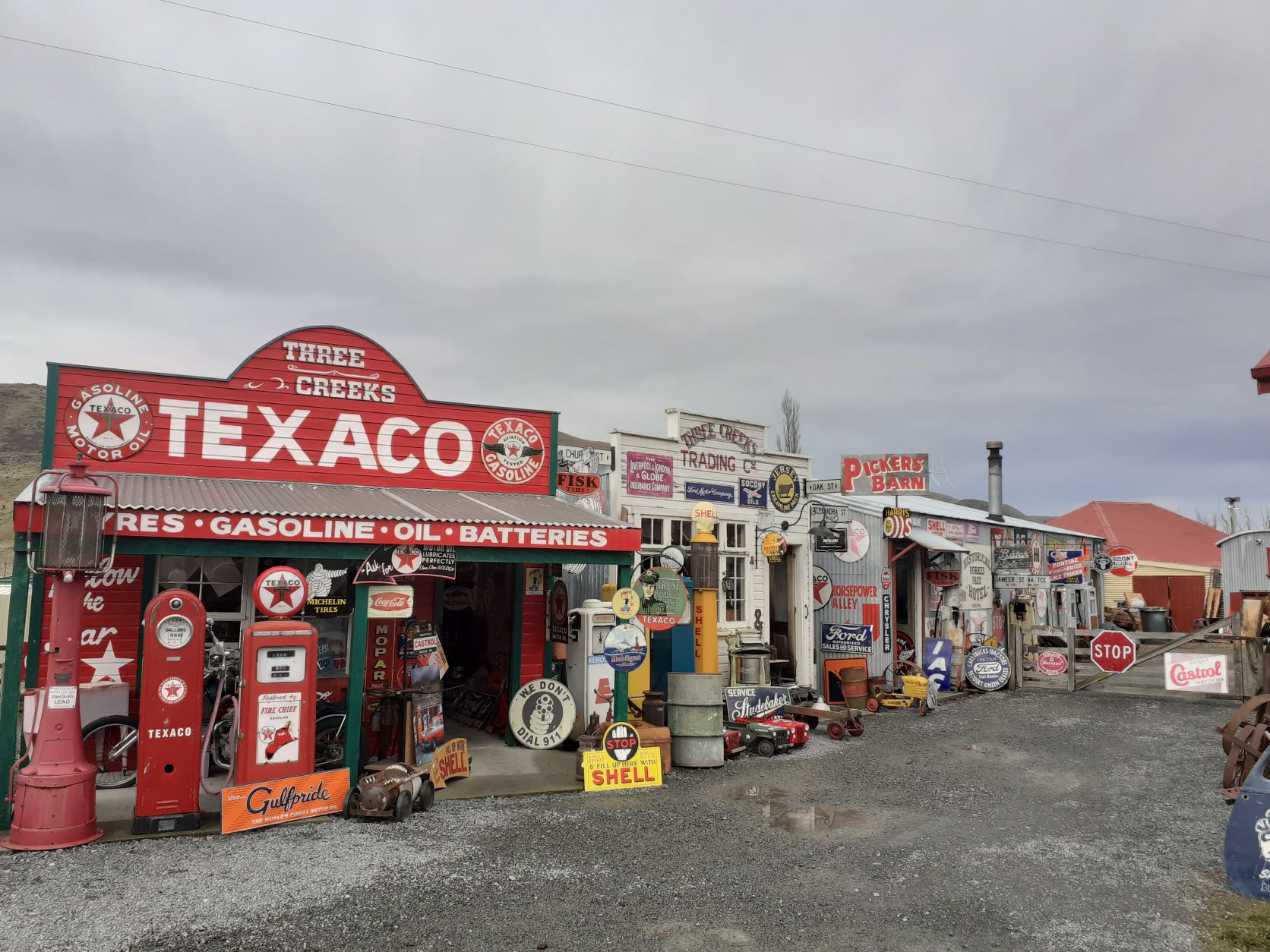
Three Creeks, Burkes Pass (July 2021)

However, the promised railway, which was to cement Burkes Pass's future as the capital of the Mackenzie, never arrived. It stopped at Fairlie in 1884, displacing Burkes Pass as the business centre. The final blow was in 1891, when the Mount Cook Road Board, in a 4–3 vote, decided to relocate to Fairlie.

The Burkes Pass Scenic Reserve, administered by the Department of Conservation, is a former stock droving reserve one kilometre to the west of the pass. The ecological values are threatened by introduced rabbits, lupin, broom and wilding conifers. Burkes Pass is home to the critically endangered Canterbury knobbled weevil which lives on speargrass. It has only been found in a 3-hectare (7.4-acre) site at Burkes Pass.

== Notable people ==
Georgina Jane Burgess – New Zealand hotel-keeper, midwife, postmistress
