= Esther Borough Johnson =

English painter

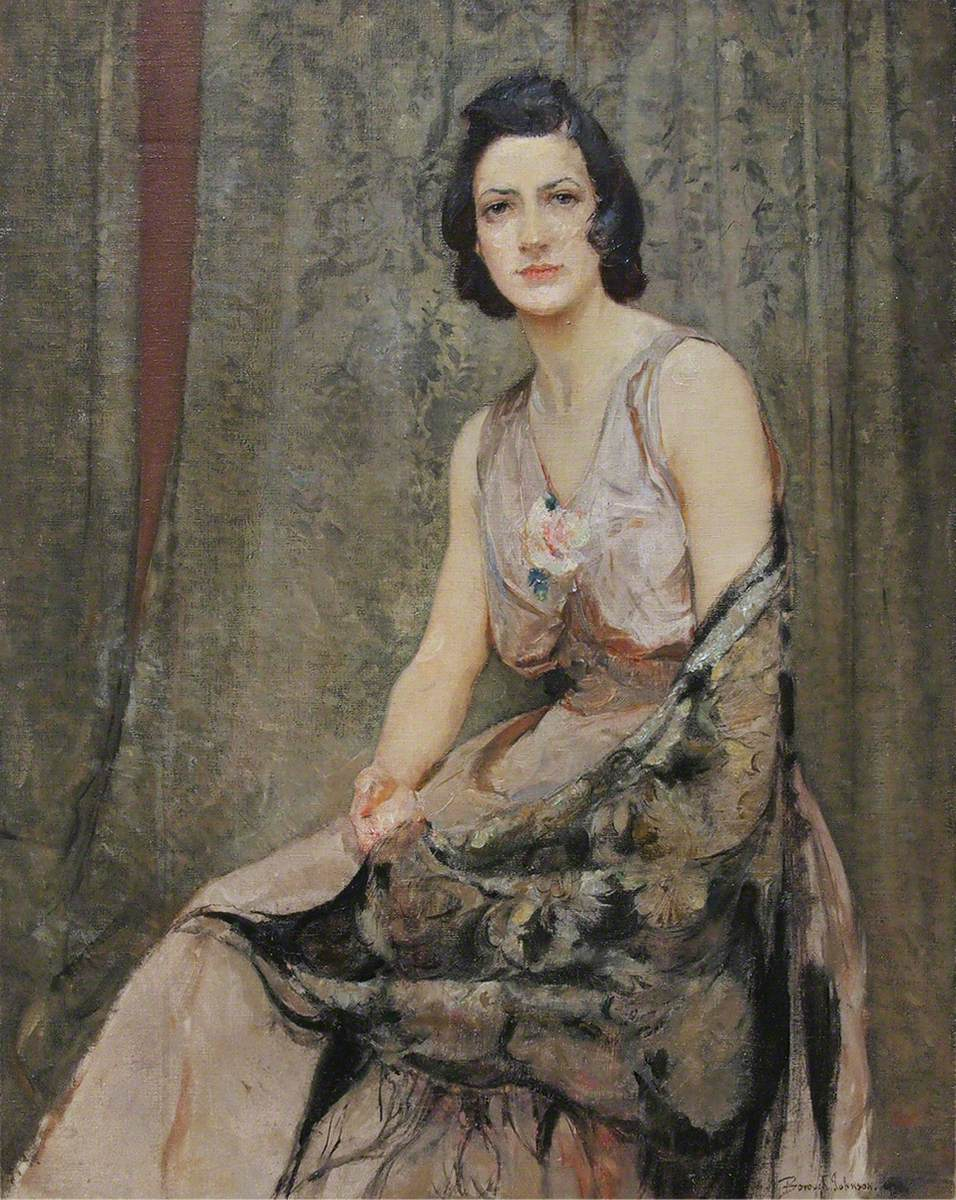
- Portrait of the artist by Ernest Borough Johnson (1866–1949), her husband.
- Born: Esther Harriet George; 2 April 1866; Sutton Maddock, Shropshire
- Died: 28 October 1958 (aged 92); Worcester Park, Surrey
- Education: Birmingham School of Art; Chelsea Art School; von Herkomer's School of Art
- Known for: Painting
- Spouse: Ernest Borough Johnson (1866–1949)

Esther Harriet Borough Johnson (Note: In this article, the surname is Borough Johnson.) née George (1866–1958) was a British painter.

== Personal life ==
Esther Harriet George was born on 2 April 1866 at Sutton Maddock in Shropshire. Her father was a clergyman, a curate at the time of her birth and later vicar of Pentney, Norfolk. She had a twin sister Lydia. She married the artist Ernest Borough Johnson (1866–1949) in 1903, and thereafter painted under the name Esther Borough Johnson. She died on 28 October 1958, aged 92, in a nursing home in Worcester Park, Surrey.

== Painting career ==
Borough Johnson studied at Birmingham School of Art, Chelsea Art School and at Hubert von Herkomer's School of Art in Bushey. During her career she exhibited paintings at the Royal Academy in London, with the Royal Institute of Painters in Watercolours, the Royal Institute of Oil Painters and with the Women's International Art Club. Her works are held in collections including Brighton and Hove Museums and Art Galleries, Bushey Museum and Art Gallery and The Box, Plymouth.

She wrote The technique of flower painting in oil, water-colour, and pastel, published by Pitman (1931), and the introduction to a 1907 Drawings of Michael Angelo published by Newnes.
