= Mackenzie District Council =

Territorial authority of New Zealand

Coordinates: 44.1001136°S 170.8266371°E

Type
- Type: Unicameral of Mackenzie District
- Houses: Governing Body
- Term limits: None

History
- Founded: 6 March 1989

Leadership
- Mayor: Scott Aronsen

Structure
- Seats: 7 (1 mayor, 6 ward seats)
- Length of term: 3 years

Website
- mackenzie.govt.nz

Mackenzie District Council is the territorial authority for the Mackenzie District of New Zealand. Its headquarters are at Fairlie.

The council is led by the mayor of Mackenzie, who is currently Scott Aronsen. There are also seven ward councillors. Following a cancer diagnosis that Munro made public in late 2024, she took extended leave from January 2025, with Karen Morgan as deputy mayor filling in. On 21 July 2025, Munro announced that she would not return from annual leave, but had to resign over uncertain health outlooks. Munro asked Morgan to remain in her acting role until the 2025 New Zealand local elections.

== Composition ==
=== Councillors ===
- Mayor Scott Aronsen
- Pukaki Ward: James Leslie, Matt Murphy, Emily Bradbury
- Opuha Ward: Anne Munro, Murray Cox, Stuart Barwood

=== Community boards ===
- Fairlie Community Board: Les Blacklock, Murray Cox, Angela Habracken, Damon Smith, Leaine Rush
- Tekapo Community Board: Steve Howes, Matt Murphy, Sharron Binns, Chris Scrase, Caroll Simcox
- Twizel Community Board: Jacqui de Buyzer, Amanda Sargent, Renee Rowland, Tracy Gunn, Emily Bradbury

== History ==
The council was established in 1989, replacing the MacKenzie County Council established in 1883.

In 2020, the council had 33 staff, including 10 earning more than $100,000. According to the right-wing Taxpayers' Union lobby group, residential rates averaged $1,884.
