= Fairlie, New Zealand =

Town in the South Island of New Zealand

Fairlie
- Town
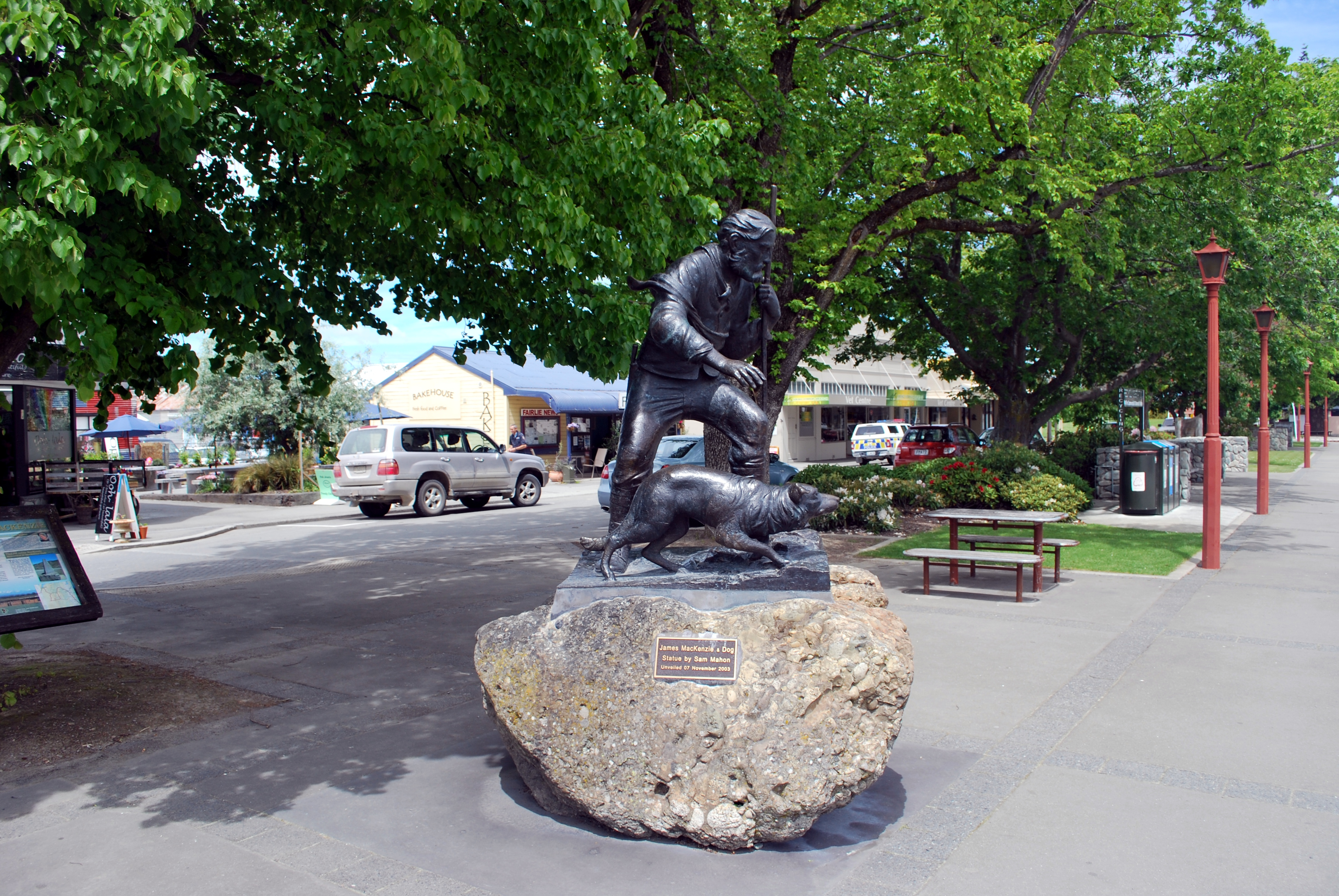
- A statue of James Mckenzie and his dog, in the centre of the town
- Interactive map of Fairlie
- Coordinates: 44°5′54″S 170°49′45″E
- Country: New Zealand
- Region: Canterbury
- Territorial authority: Mackenzie District
- Ward: Opuha Ward
- Community: Fairlie Community
- Electorates: Waitaki; Te Tai Tonga (Māori)

Government
  - Territorial authority: Mackenzie District Council
  - Regional council: Environment Canterbury
  - Mayor of Mackenzie: Scott Aronsen
  - Waitaki MP: Miles Anderson
  - Te Tai Tonga MP: Tākuta Ferris

Area
  - Total: 4.95 km^{2} (1.91 sq mi)

Population (June 2025)
  - Total: 970
  - Density: 200/km^{2} (510/sq mi)
- Time zone: UTC+12 (New Zealand Standard Time)
  - Summer (DST): UTC+13 (New Zealand Daylight Time)
- Postcode: 7925
- Area code: 03
- Local iwi: Ngāi Tahu
- Website: www.mackenzie.govt.nz

Fairlie is a Mackenzie District service town (or township) located in the Canterbury region of the South Island of New Zealand. The estimated population was 970 as of June 2025. Being on state highway 8 between Christchurch (182 km, 2 hours 20 minutes drive) and Queenstown (300 km 3.5 hours drive), tourism is fast becoming a major industry within the town. Kimbell is 8 km west of Fairlie via state highway 8. Geraldine is 45 km east via state highway 79 and Timaru is 58 km southeast of Fairlie via state highway 8. Fairlie sits at an altitude of 301 metres above sea level.

From 1884 to 1968, the town was served by the Fairlie Branch railway, though until 1934, this branch line actually terminated a kilometre beyond Fairlie in Eversley.

Fairlie is commonly known as the gateway to the Mackenzie Basin. The town was initially called Fairlie's Creek, a name purportedly chosen by David Hamilton, the brother-in-law of James Lister (or Lizter), who had built a boarding house near the creek. The name Hamilton had been suggested, but was rejected due to similarity to the City of Hamilton in the North Island. David Hamilton suggested the town be named Fairlie after Fairlie, Scotland, which he had visited as part of his honeymoon. After 1892, the town's name was shortened to Fairlie.

The Ōpihi River runs past Fairlie.

== Governance ==
The Mackenzie District Council provide local government services to Fairlie. The Mackenzie District Council offices are located at 53 Main Street, Fairlie. Fairlie is part of the Waitaki electorate. Miles Anderson of the National Party is the current member of parliament.

== Demographics ==
Fairlie is described by Statistics New Zealand as a rural settlement. It covers 4.95 km^{2} (1.91 sq mi) and had an estimated population of 970 as of June 2025, with a population density of 196 people per km^{2}.

Historical population
Year	Pop.	±% p.a.
2006	867	—
2013	861	−0.10%
2018	885	+0.55%
2023	918	+0.73%

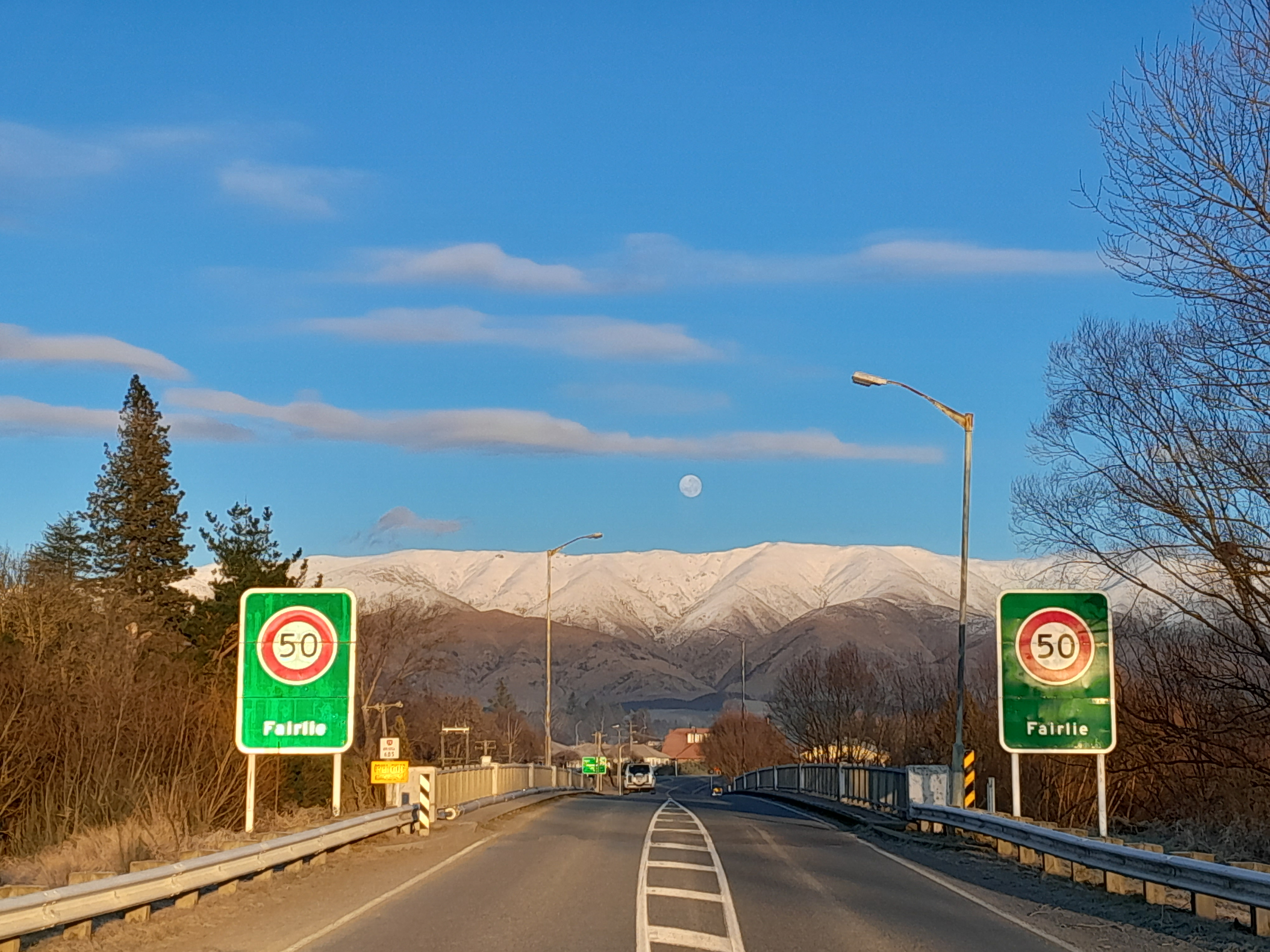
The bridge over the Ōpihi River just before Fairlie (July 2022)

Fairlie had a population of 918 in the 2023 New Zealand census, an increase of 33 people (3.7%) since the 2018 census, and an increase of 57 people (6.6%) since the 2013 census. There were 477 males, 435 females, and 3 people of other genders in 402 dwellings. 1.6% of people identified as LGBTIQ+. The median age was 47.5 years (compared with 38.1 years nationally). There were 135 people (14.7%) aged under 15 years, 138 (15.0%) aged 15 to 29, 405 (44.1%) aged 30 to 64, and 240 (26.1%) aged 65 or older.

People could identify as more than one ethnicity. The results were 88.9% European (Pākehā); 9.8% Māori; 2.0% Pasifika; 6.2% Asian; 0.3% Middle Eastern, Latin American and African New Zealanders (MELAA); and 1.3% other, which includes people giving their ethnicity as "New Zealander". English was spoken by 97.7%, Māori by 0.7%, and other languages by 7.5%. No language could be spoken by 1.0% (e.g. too young to talk). New Zealand Sign Language was known by 0.3%. The percentage of people born overseas was 19.0, compared with 28.8% nationally.

Religious affiliations were 33.7% Christian, 1.6% Hindu, 0.3% Buddhist, 0.3% New Age, and 1.3% other religions. People who answered that they had no religion were 52.6%, and 9.8% of people did not answer the census question.

Of those at least 15 years old, 114 (14.6%) people had a bachelor's or higher degree, 444 (56.7%) had a post-high school certificate or diploma, and 225 (28.7%) people exclusively held high school qualifications. The median income was $36,100, compared with $41,500 nationally. 36 people (4.6%) earned over $100,000 compared to 12.1% nationally. The employment status of those at least 15 was 399 (51.0%) full-time, 114 (14.6%) part-time, and 9 (1.1%) unemployed.

=== Opua statistical area ===
The Opua statistical area surrounds but does not include Fairlie. It covers 1,978.38 km^{2} (763.86 sq mi) and had an estimated population of 1,460 as of June 2025, with a population density of 0.74 people per km^{2}.

Historical population
Year	Pop.	±% p.a.
2006	1,107	—
2013	1,263	+1.90%
2018	1,347	+1.30%
2023	1,398	+0.75%

Opua had a population of 1,398 in the 2023 New Zealand census, an increase of 51 people (3.8%) since the 2018 census, and an increase of 135 people (10.7%) since the 2013 census. There were 738 males, 651 females, and 9 people of other genders in 546 dwellings. 1.7% of people identified as LGBTIQ+. The median age was 40.2 years (compared with 38.1 years nationally). There were 297 people (21.2%) aged under 15 years, 231 (16.5%) aged 15 to 29, 690 (49.4%) aged 30 to 64, and 180 (12.9%) aged 65 or older.

People could identify as more than one ethnicity. The results were 92.9% European (Pākehā); 8.2% Māori; 0.6% Pasifika; 1.9% Asian; 0.6% Middle Eastern, Latin American and African New Zealanders (MELAA); and 4.3% other, which includes people giving their ethnicity as "New Zealander". English was spoken by 97.6%, Māori by 1.3%, Samoan by 0.2%, and other languages by 5.6%. No language could be spoken by 1.9% (e.g. too young to talk). New Zealand Sign Language was known by 0.2%. The percentage of people born overseas was 14.2, compared with 28.8% nationally.

Religious affiliations were 33.5% Christian, 0.6% Hindu, 0.4% Buddhist, 0.2% New Age, 0.2% Jewish, and 0.6% other religions. People who answered that they had no religion were 54.7%, and 9.9% of people did not answer the census question.

Of those at least 15 years old, 210 (19.1%) people had a bachelor's or higher degree, 693 (62.9%) had a post-high school certificate or diploma, and 195 (17.7%) people exclusively held high school qualifications. The median income was $44,000, compared with $41,500 nationally. 114 people (10.4%) earned over $100,000 compared to 12.1% nationally. The employment status of those at least 15 was 663 (60.2%) full-time, 180 (16.3%) part-time, and 18 (1.6%) unemployed.

== Education ==
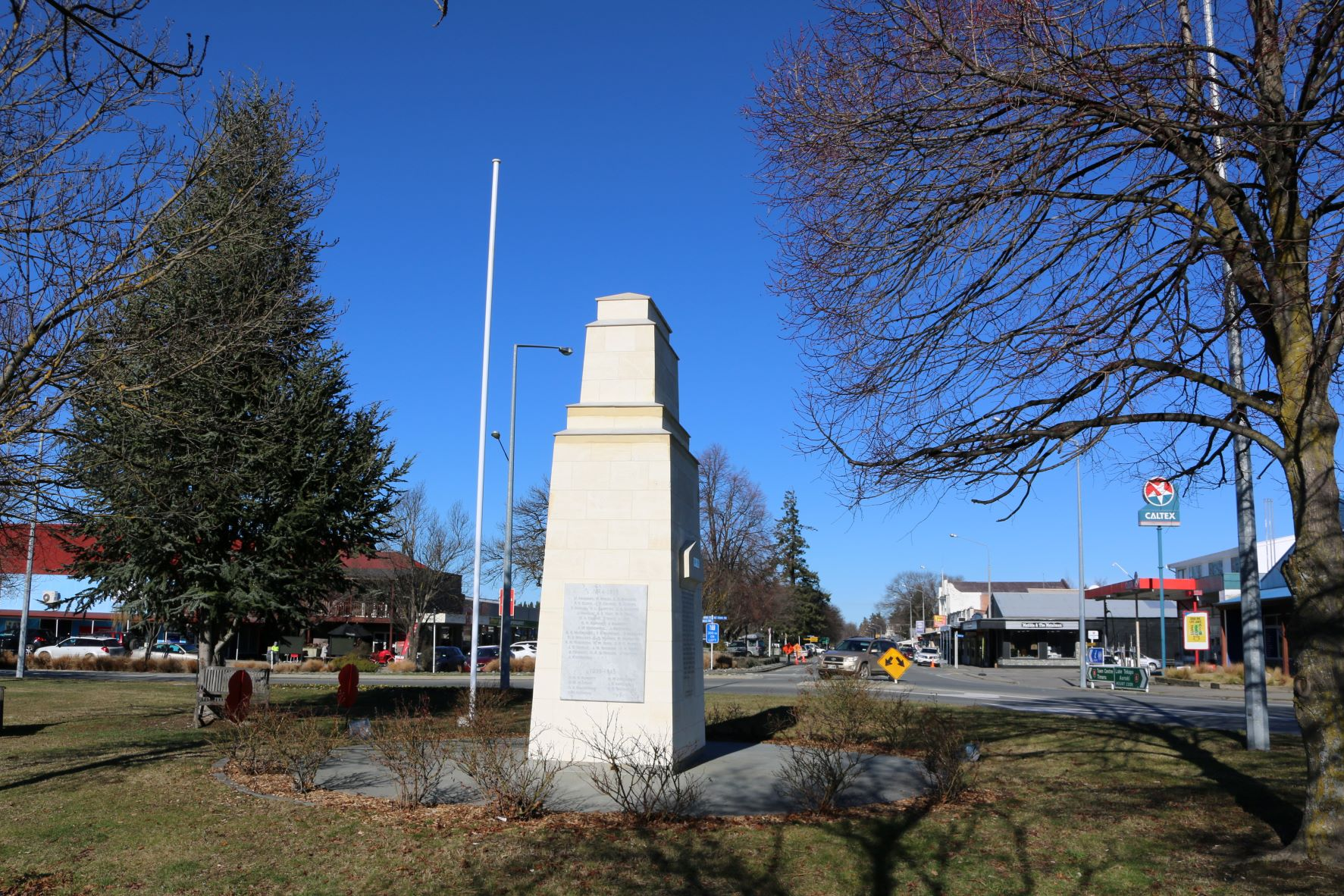
Fairlie War Memorial in the town centre (July 2021)

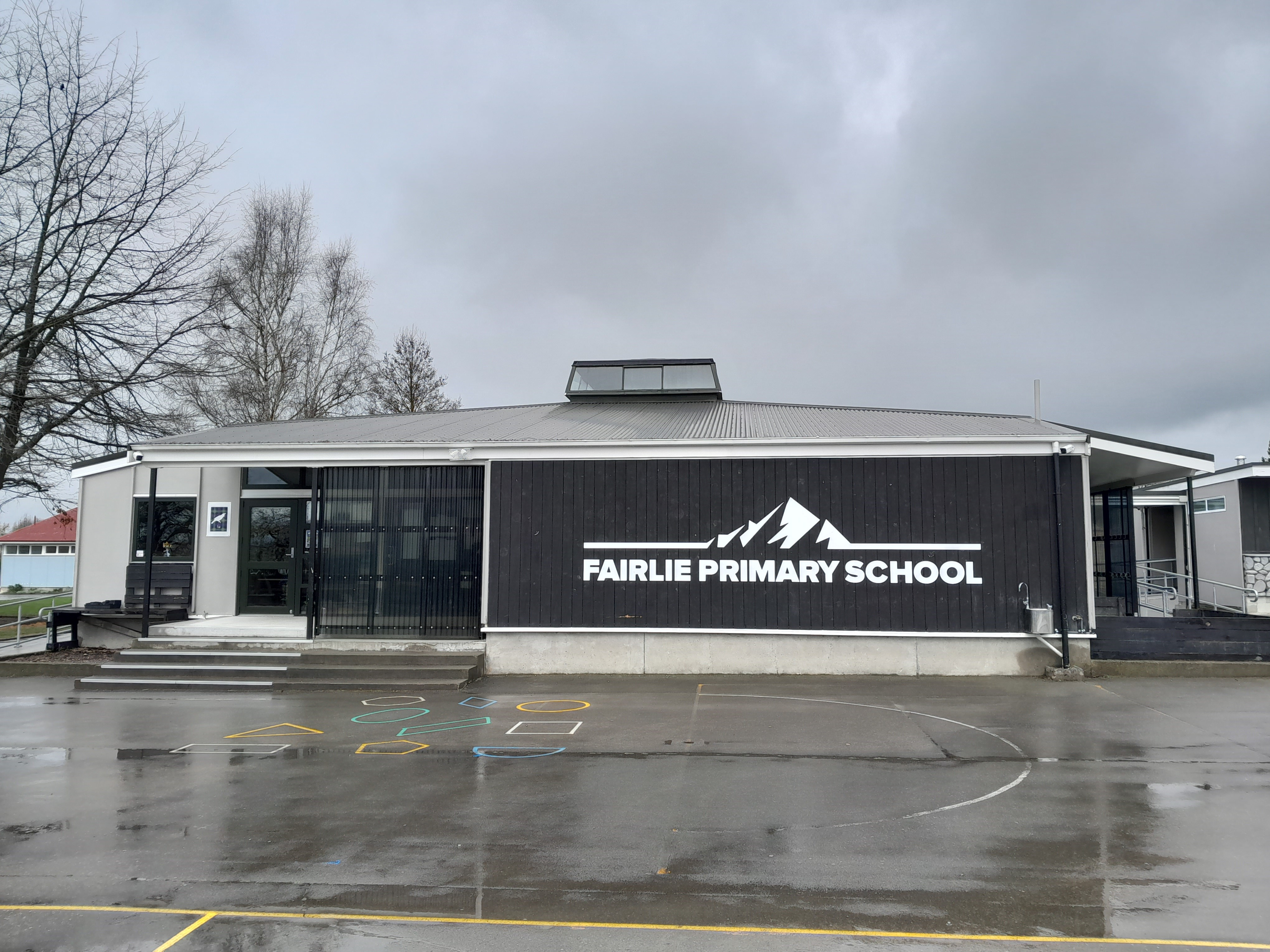
Fairlie Primary School (2023)

Fairlie has three schools:

- Fairlie School is a state contributing primary (Year 1 to 6) school. It has 137 students as of July 2026.
- Mackenzie College is a state Year 7 to 13 secondary school. It has 194 students as of July 2026.
- Saint Joseph's School is a state-integrated Catholic full primary (Year 1 to 8) school. It has 26 students as of July 2026. It opened in 1939.

Fairlie Creek School opened in 1879. In 1922 it established a secondary department, becoming Fairlie District High School (sometimes called Fairlie High School). Between 1939 and 1954, seven other schools merged to Fairlie District High: Allandale, Sherwood, Ashwick Flat, Ashwick, Kimbell (including Burke's Pass), Cricklewood and Shipton. Secondary students from Lake Tekapo also began busing to Fairlie during this time. By 1990 it had become Mackenzie College.

== Facilities and sports ==
=== Mackenzie agricultural and pastoral show ===
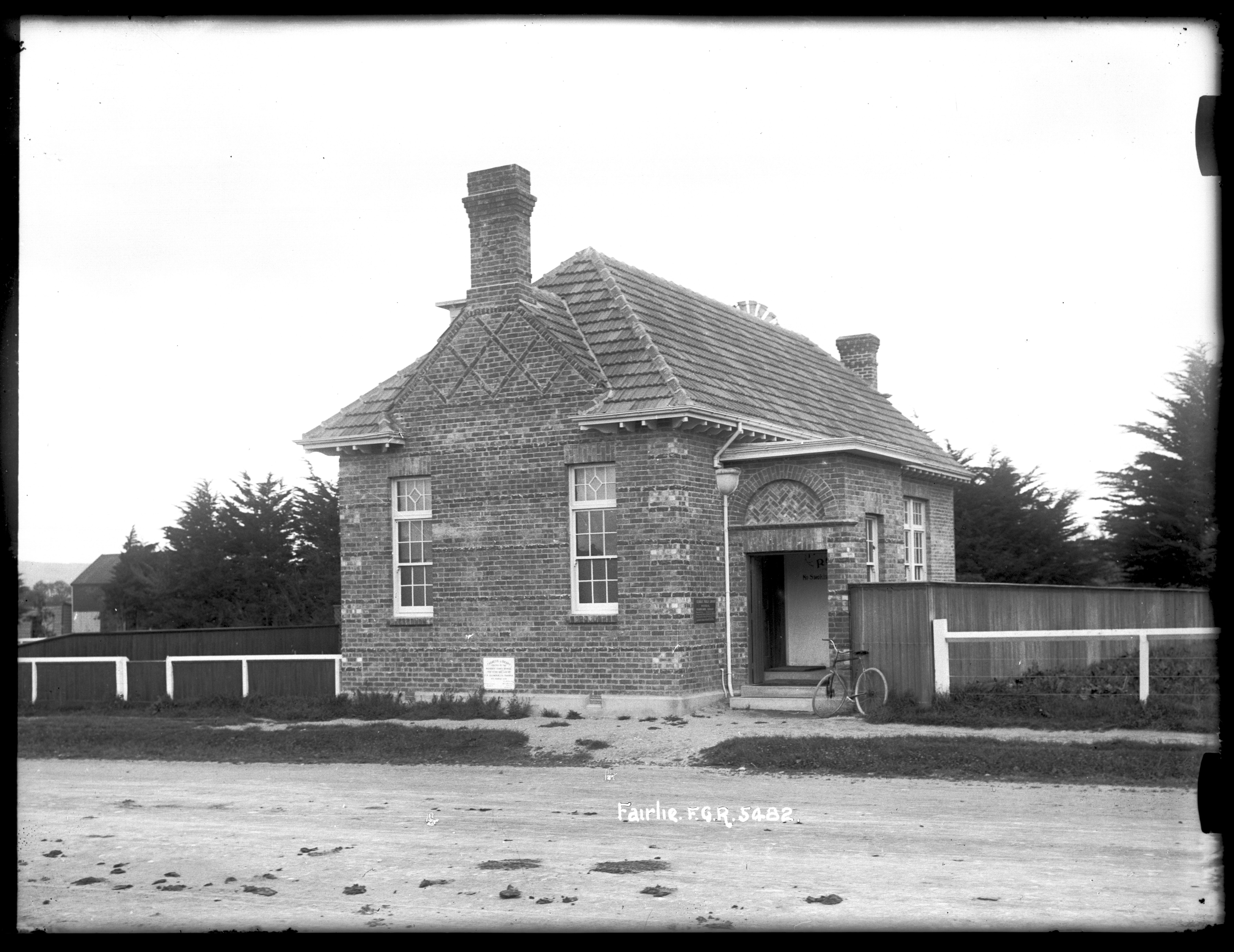
Fairlie Public Library (1916)

Fairlie hosts the annual Mackenzie District Agricultural and Pastoral show every Easter Monday. The first show was in 1899. The 100th edition ran in 1998. The show has been cancelled three times. Firstly in 1925 because of a polio epidemic, in 1943 due to WWII and 1948 due to an infantile paralysis epidemic.

=== Ski fields ===
Fairlie is near the Two Thumb mountain range. There are two ski fields close located nearby. Mount Dobson Ski Field is 28 km drive from Fairlie, as is Fox Peak Ski Field.

=== Golf course ===
The Fairlie Golf Club is an 18-hole golf course located on Talbot Street. The flat course has a 5526 metre long men's course with par being 70 and a 5017 metre long women's course with par being 72. The Fairlie 500 is a 72-hole tournament which is played on the third weekend of March each year. In April each year, the Glencairn ladies pairs tournament is held.

=== Rugby ===
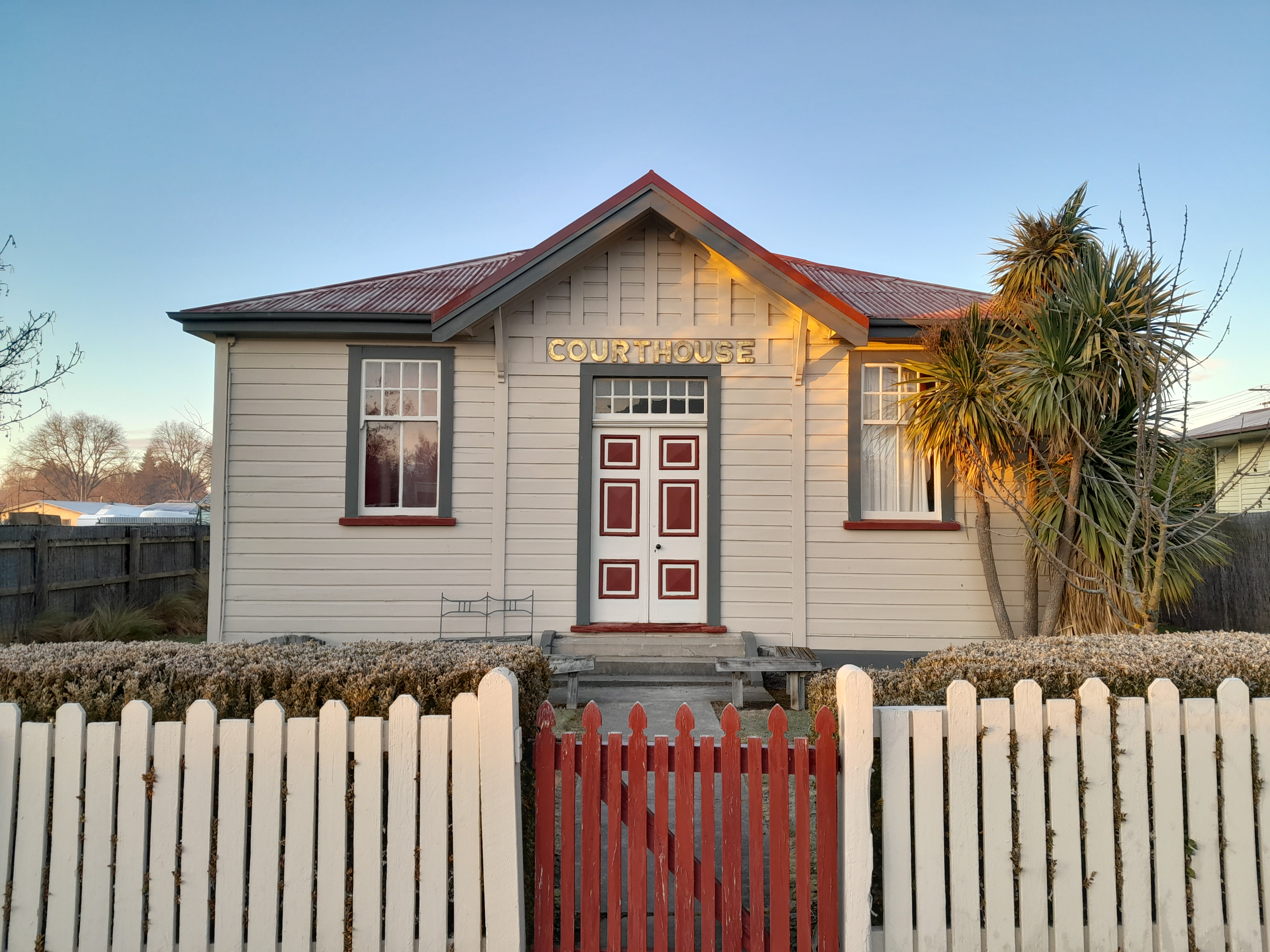
The former Fairlie courthouse

The Mackenzie rugby football club is based in Fairlie at Strathconan Park. It plays in all grades in the South Canterbury Rugby Union competitions. The Fairlie Creek Football Club was established in 1884 and played the rival Albury club two to three times each year initially. The Mackenzie sub union was formed in 1907 after the formation of the Cricklewood Club in 1907. Two other teams, Cave in 1911 and Alpine in 1912, also joined the Mackenzie sub union. After World War II, Tekapo and Pukaki also joined the Mackenzie sub union. In 1953, after the retirement of a number of players, the various clubs merged to form the Mackenzie rugby football club.

=== Swimming pool ===
The Strathconan pool is located on School Road, Fairlie. It is open between October and March each year. The facility includes a 25-metre heated indoor swimming pool. Management of the pool was transferred from the Mackenzie District Council to Belgravia Leisure for the 2020–2021 season.

=== Ice skating ===
The Fairlie Ice Rink is located between the Fairlie Domain and the Fairlie Campground. The ice rink is based on a man made pond and is reliant on cold weather which determines the length of the ice skating season. The location of the ice rink is two degrees Celsius colder than the town. The ice rink has been operating since the 1930s.

=== Half marathon ===
The Mackenzie Half-Marathon which first ran in July 2020 starts in Fairlie. 355 runners competed. The second edition ran in July 2021. The course includes a river crossing.

=== Skateboarding ===
A $100,000 skateboard park was proposed for Fairlie. It was finished in early 2021 and would have cost the community significantly more had not 1200 hours of work been completed by local volunteers.

=== Fairlie heritage museum ===
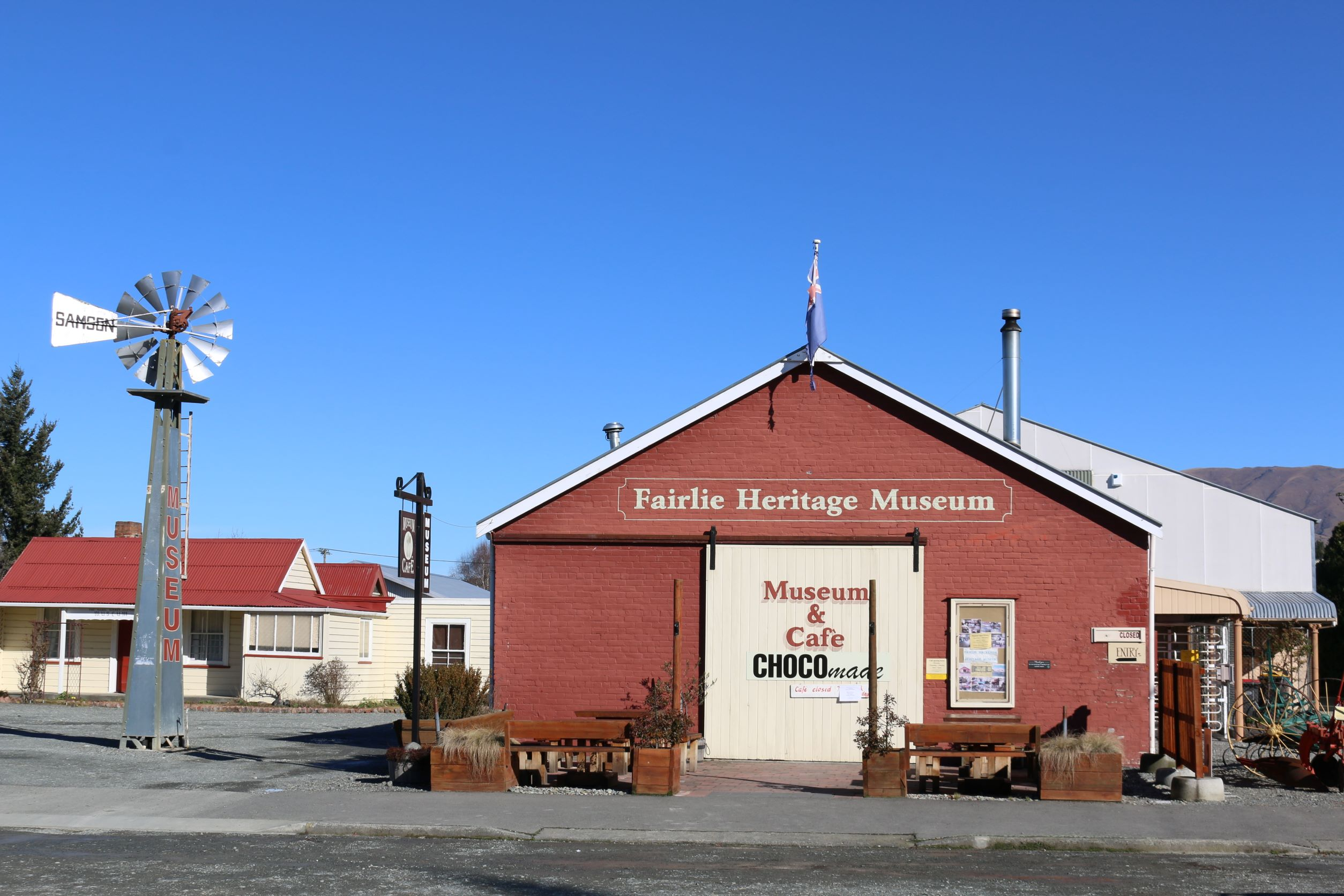
Fairlie Heritage Museum (July 2021)

The Fairlie heritage museum contains a collection of farm machinery, as well as many buildings including the old railway station. The Fairlie Heritage Museum has one of the biggest vintage wagon and carriage collections in the country.

== Notable residents ==
Jack Lovelock lived in Fairlie between 1919 and 1923. He was dux of the primary section of Fairlie School. The Jack Lovelock memorial track is an eight kilometre walking trail in Fairlie, named in his honour.

== Climate ==
Fairlie has mild summers and frosty winters. In summer, temperatures exceed 25 °C (77 °F) an average of 30 days a year and 30 °C (86 °F) on a few afternoons most years, while in winter temperatures drop below 0 °C (32 °F) an average of 113 nights a year.

Climate data for Fairlie (1992–2009 normals, extremes 1925–2009)
Month	Jan	Feb	Mar	Apr	May	Jun	Jul	Aug	Sep	Oct	Nov	Dec	Year
Record high °C (°F)	35.6 (96.1)	38.5 (101.3)	33.3 (91.9)	31.4 (88.5)	25.0 (77.0)	22.0 (71.6)	20.0 (68.0)	22.0 (71.6)	27.8 (82.0)	28.7 (83.7)	33.7 (92.7)	33.1 (91.6)	38.5 (101.3)
Mean maximum °C (°F)	31.6 (88.9)	30.8 (87.4)	27.9 (82.2)	24.6 (76.3)	21.1 (70.0)	18.1 (64.6)	17.4 (63.3)	19.1 (66.4)	21.9 (71.4)	24.6 (76.3)	27.3 (81.1)	28.4 (83.1)	32.5 (90.5)
Mean daily maximum °C (°F)	22.9 (73.2)	21.9 (71.4)	19.7 (67.5)	17.0 (62.6)	14.2 (57.6)	10.8 (51.4)	10.6 (51.1)	12.5 (54.5)	15.3 (59.5)	16.6 (61.9)	18.7 (65.7)	20.3 (68.5)	16.7 (62.1)
Daily mean °C (°F)	16.1 (61.0)	15.3 (59.5)	13.1 (55.6)	10.0 (50.0)	7.4 (45.3)	4.0 (39.2)	3.6 (38.5)	5.4 (41.7)	8.2 (46.8)	10.0 (50.0)	12.1 (53.8)	14.2 (57.6)	10.0 (49.9)
Mean daily minimum °C (°F)	9.2 (48.6)	8.7 (47.7)	6.5 (43.7)	2.9 (37.2)	0.6 (33.1)	−2.8 (27.0)	−3.4 (25.9)	−1.7 (28.9)	1.0 (33.8)	3.3 (37.9)	5.4 (41.7)	8.0 (46.4)	3.1 (37.7)
Mean minimum °C (°F)	2.3 (36.1)	1.9 (35.4)	−0.7 (30.7)	−3.8 (25.2)	−5.4 (22.3)	−8.8 (16.2)	−9.5 (14.9)	−7.1 (19.2)	−5.6 (21.9)	−3.4 (25.9)	−1.0 (30.2)	1.5 (34.7)	−11.1 (12.0)
Record low °C (°F)	−1.1 (30.0)	−2.0 (28.4)	−4.0 (24.8)	−8.6 (16.5)	−10.6 (12.9)	−14.0 (6.8)	−16.7 (1.9)	−15.0 (5.0)	−11.1 (12.0)	−6.7 (19.9)	−5.0 (23.0)	−2.0 (28.4)	−16.7 (1.9)
Average rainfall mm (inches)	51.6 (2.03)	56.5 (2.22)	80.0 (3.15)	49.6 (1.95)	52.9 (2.08)	46.2 (1.82)	39.6 (1.56)	52.5 (2.07)	43.0 (1.69)	66.6 (2.62)	57.1 (2.25)	66.2 (2.61)	661.8 (26.05)
Source: Earth Sciences NZ (rain 1979–2009)

== Notable buildings ==
The Gladstone Grand Hotel is a category two listed building built in 1884.

The Mount Cook Line building (which were formerly stables dating from 1906). This category two building was listed in 1984.

Fairlie is known for its pies produced at the Fairlie Bakehouse.

There are two church buildings, St Columba on Main Street and St Stephen's on Kirke Street. They are part of Mackenzie Cooperating Parish, an ecumenical parish. Saint Patrick and All Saints Catholic Church is located at 7 Gall Street.

In 2017, Westpac closed their Fairlie branch which left the town without a bank.

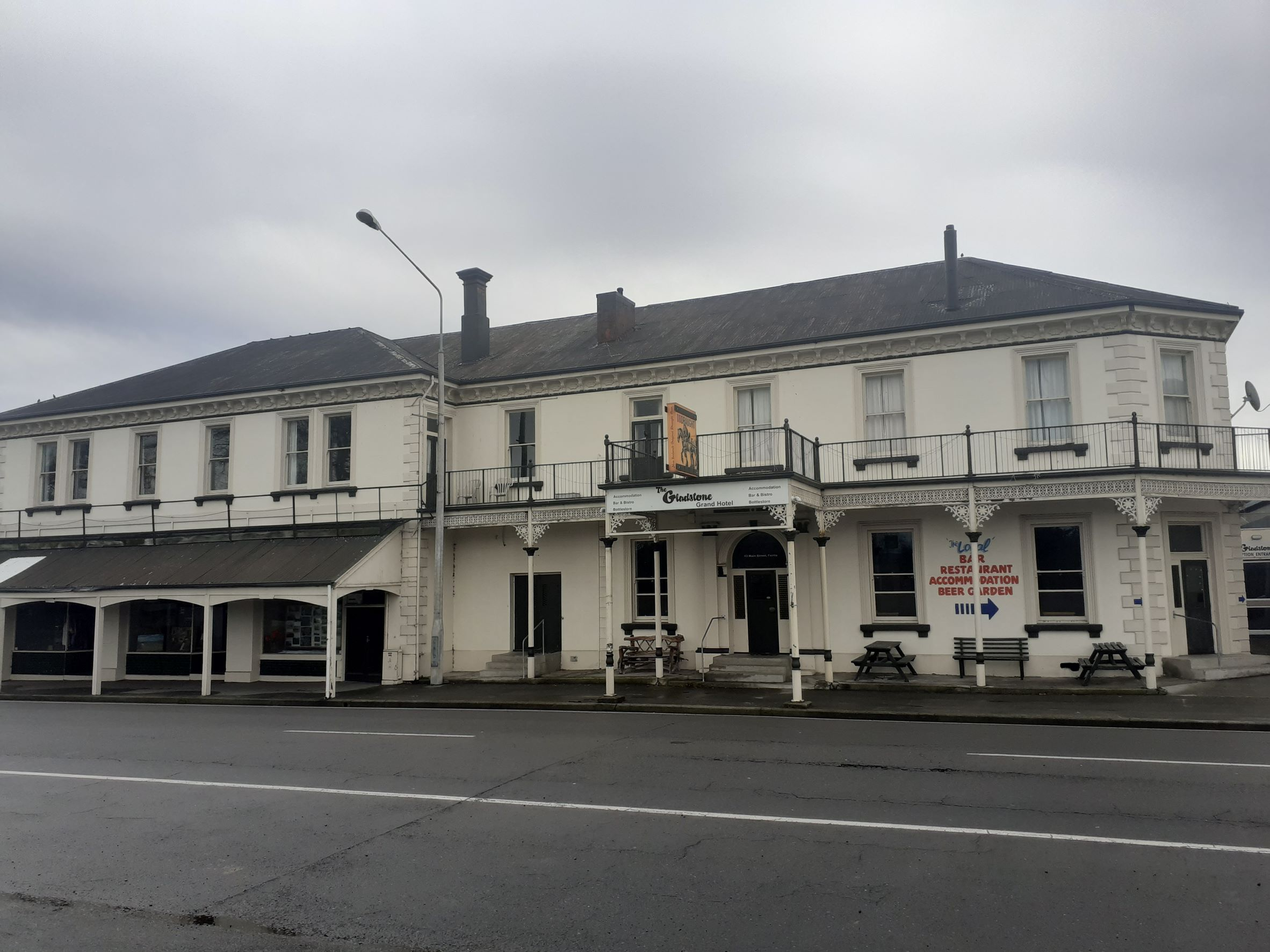
Gladstone Grand Hotel (July 2021)

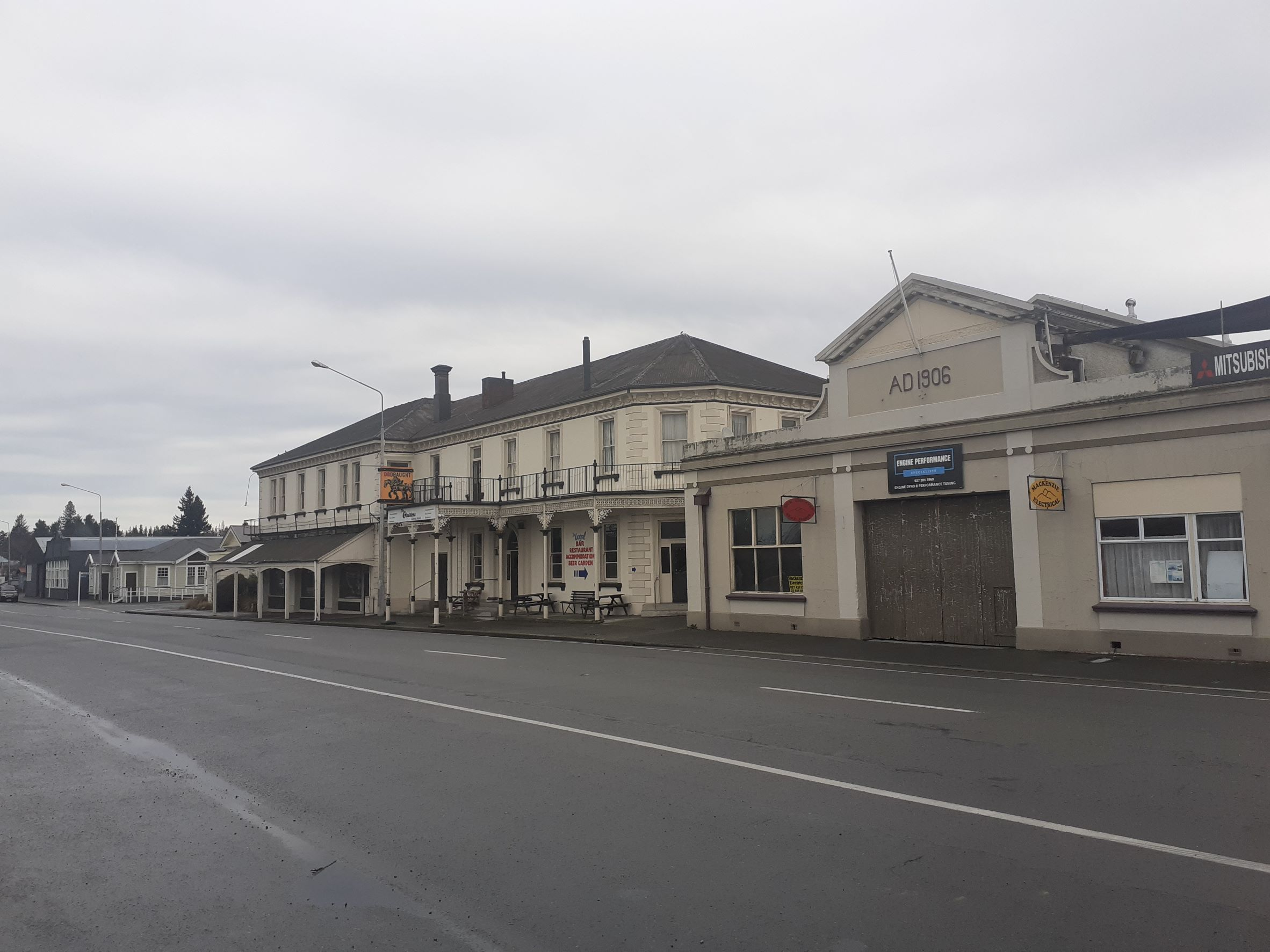
Mt Cook Line Building, next to the Gladstone Grand Hotel (July 2021)

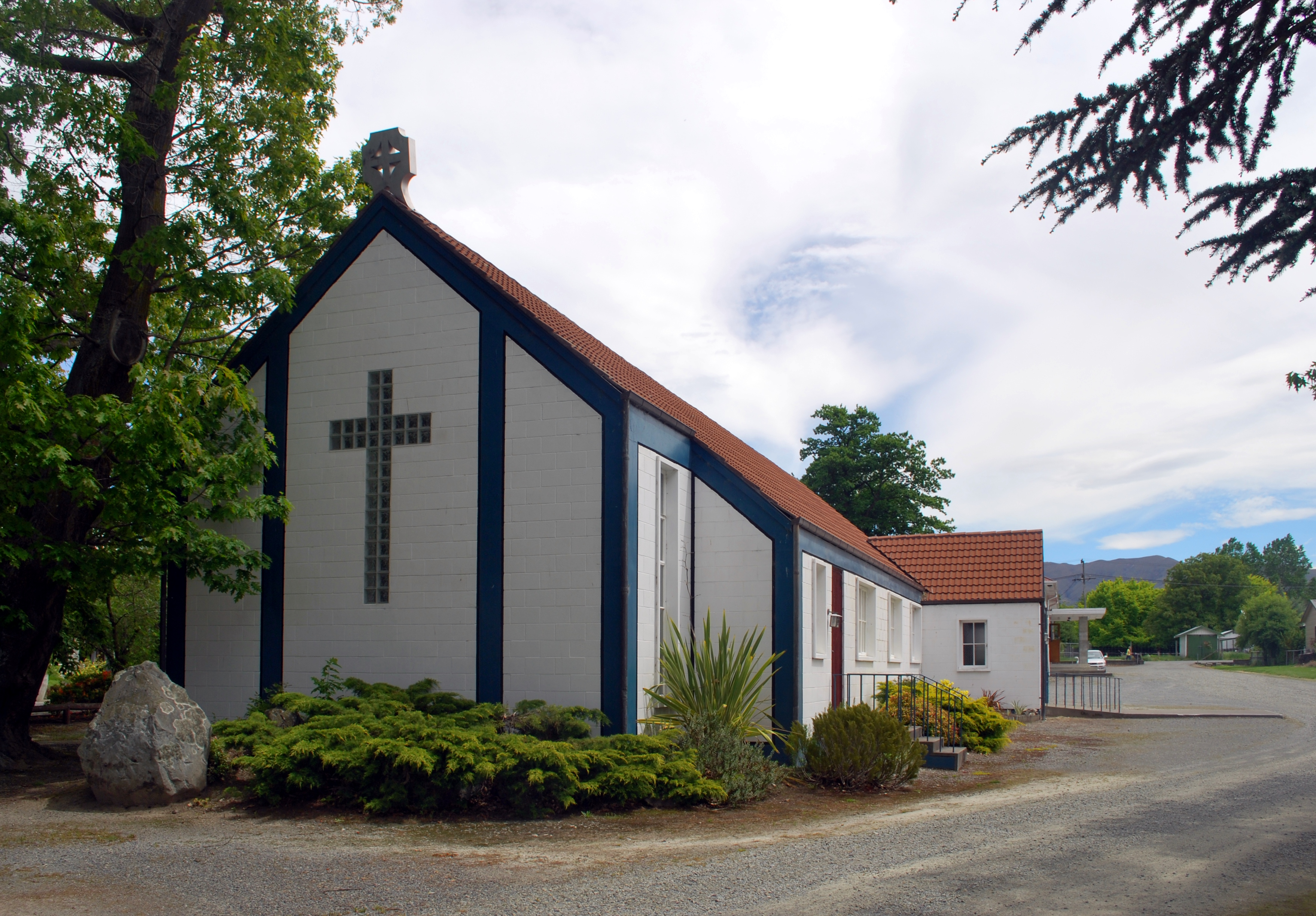
St Columba Church on Main Street (November 2011)

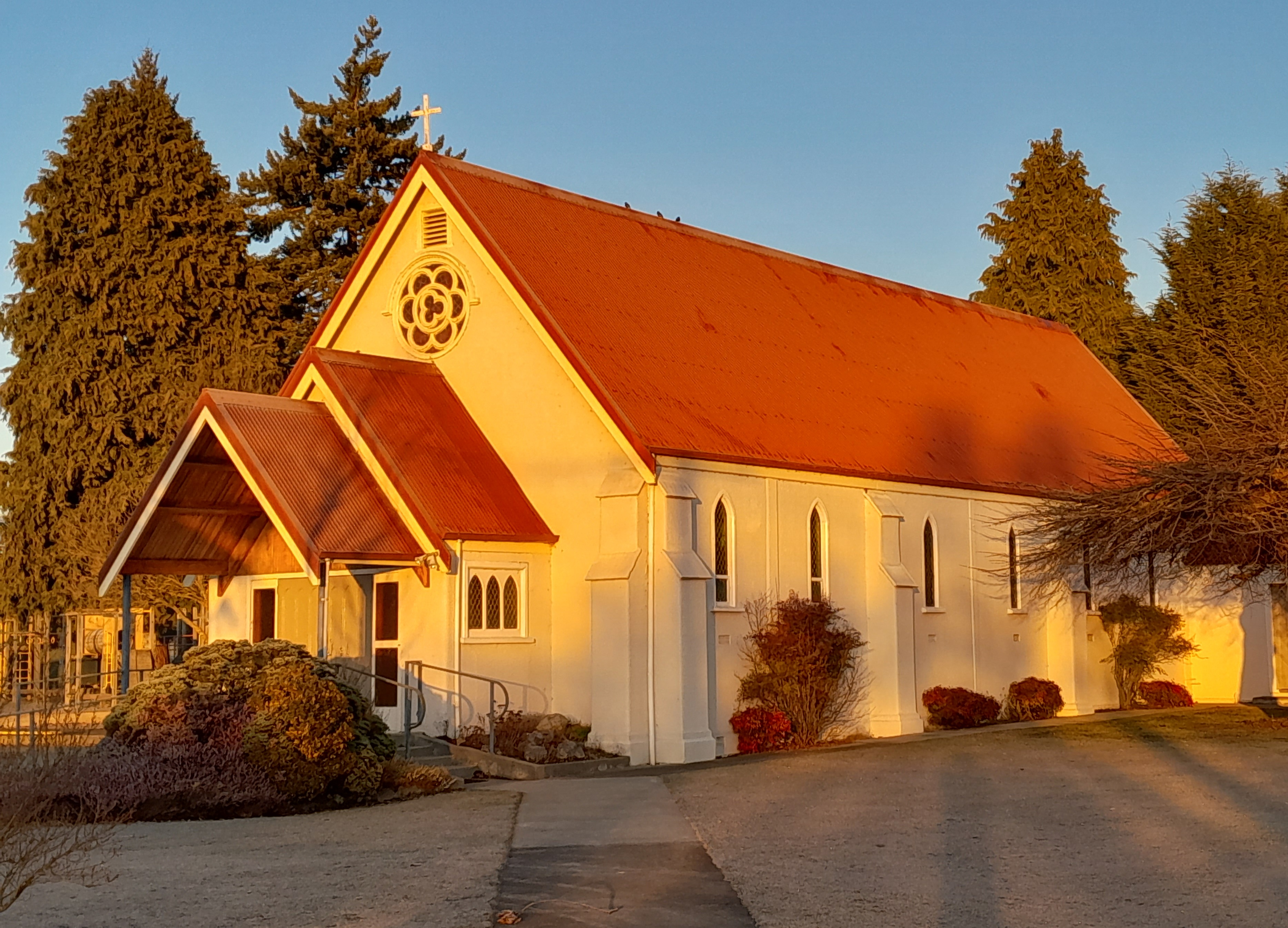
St Patrick's and All Saints Catholic Church (July 2022)

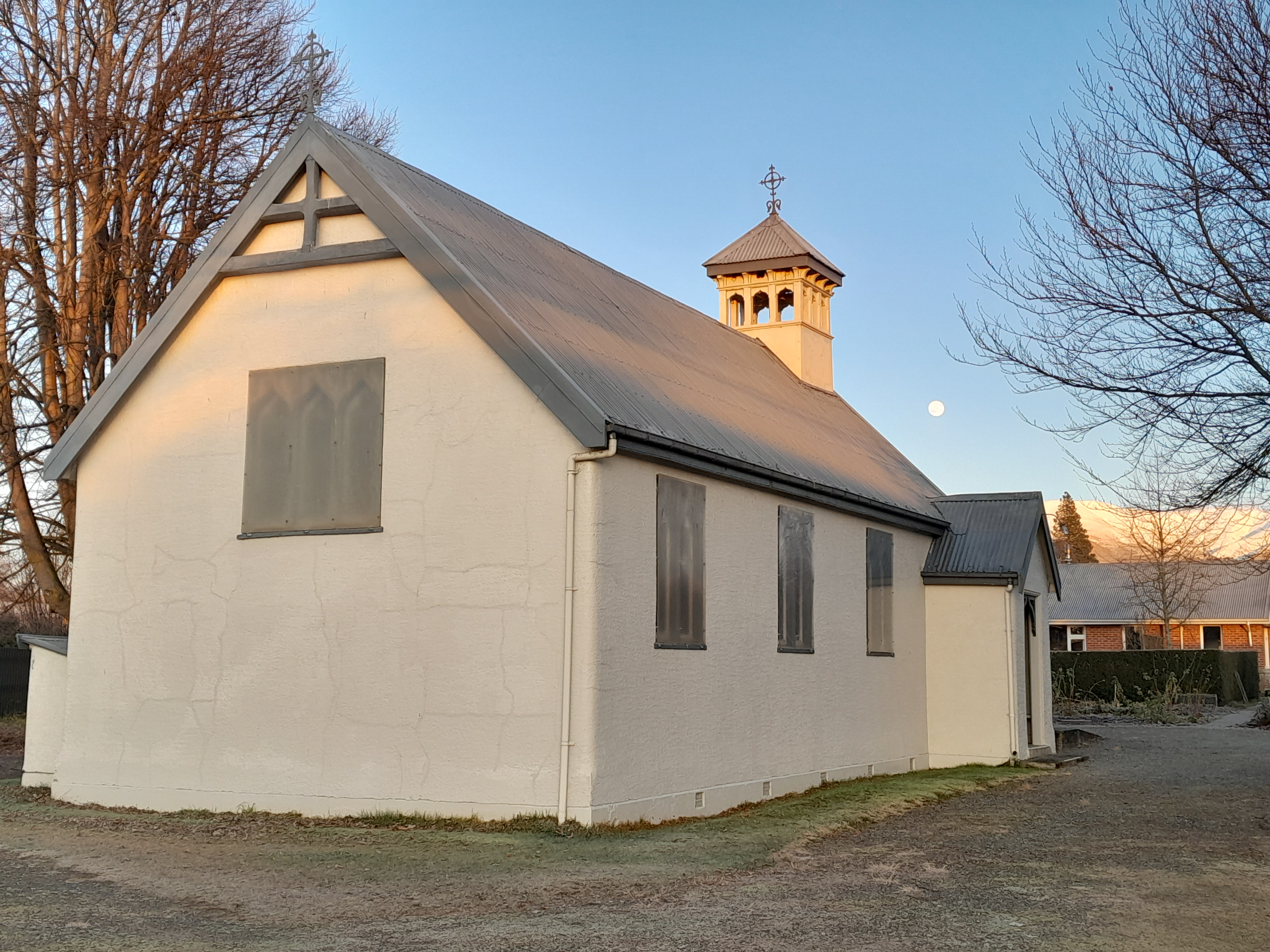
St Stephen's Anglican Church, Fairlie (July 2022)
