= Mayor of Mackenzie =

Head of a municipal government in New Zealand

- Coat of arms of the Mackenzie District Council
- Incumbent; Scott Aronsen since 2025
- Style: His/Her Worship
- Term length: Three years, renewable
- Inaugural holder: Bruce Scott
- Formation: 1989
- Salary: $88,714
- Website: Official website

The Mayor of Mackenzie officiates over the Mackenzie District Council.

Scott Aronsen has been the current mayor of Mackenzie since 2025. The previous mayor, Anne Munro, took extended leave from January 2025 following a cancer diagnosis, with Karen Morgan as deputy mayor filling in. On 21 July 2025, Munro announced that she would not return from annual leave, but had to resign over uncertain health outlooks. Munro asked Morgan to remain in her acting role until the 2025 New Zealand local elections.

== List of mayors ==
There have been 7 mayors of Mackenzie.

	Mayor	Term of office
1	Bruce Scott	1989–1992
2	Neil Anderson	1992–2001
3	Stan Scorringe	2001–2004
4	John O'Neill	2004–2010
5	Claire Barlow	2010–2016
6	Graham Smith	2016–2022
7	Anne Munro	2022–2025
8	Scott Aronsen	2025–present
