= Aigantighe Art Gallery =

Art museum in Timaru, New Zealand

- Main entrance
- Established: 1956; 70 years ago
- Location: Timaru, New Zealand
- Coordinates: 44°23′26″S 171°14′22″E
- Type: Art museum
- Collection size: over 1,800 works
- Visitors: 19,499 (2019)
- Director: Cara Fitzgerald
- Website: www.aigantighe.co.nz

The Aigantighe Art Gallery (pronounced "egg-and-tie") is an art gallery located in Timaru, New Zealand. It was established in 1956 and has the South Island's third-largest public art museum collection. It also features a sculpture garden with work from New Zealand and international sculptors.

== House ==
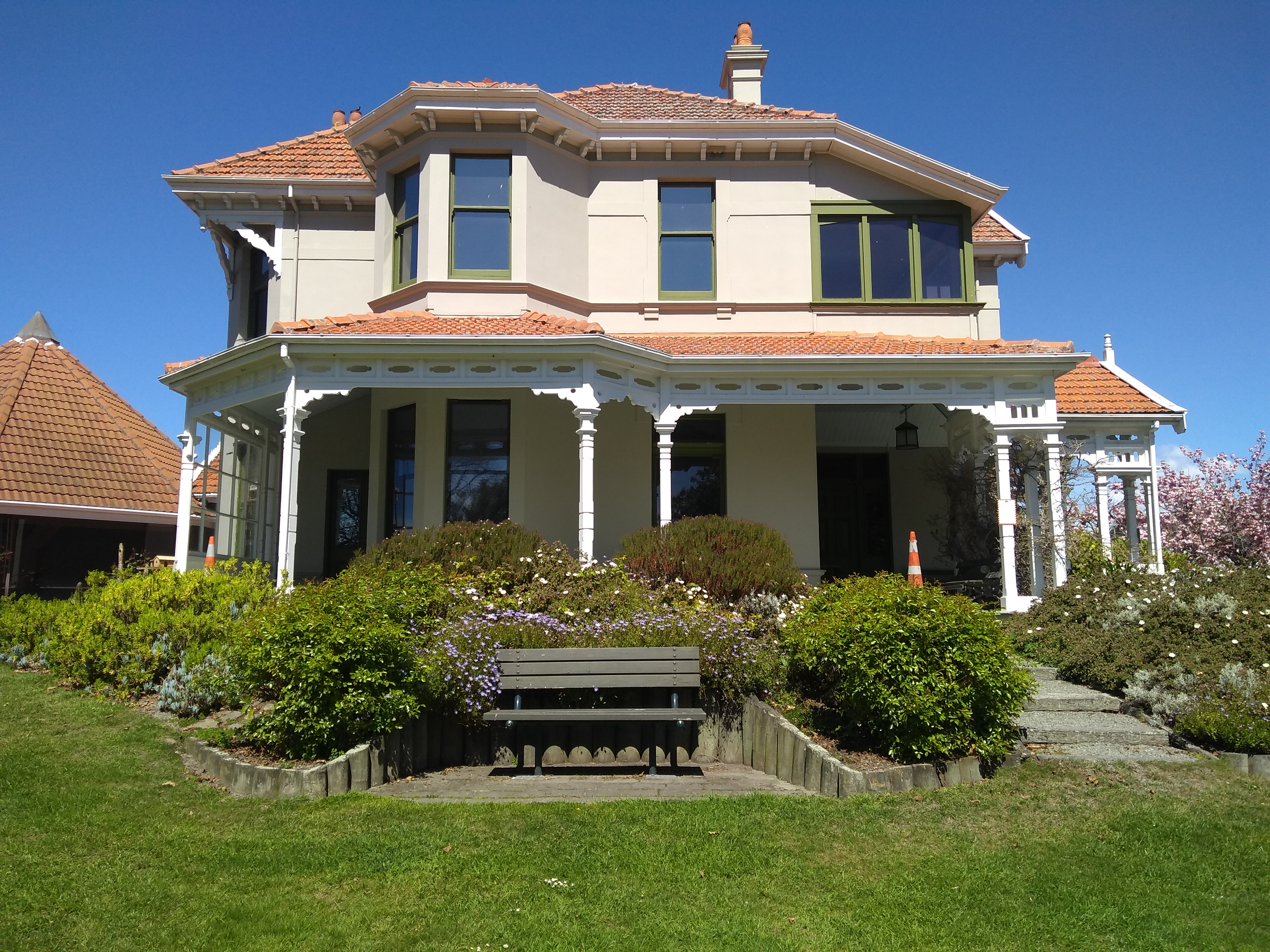
Heritage House Gallery

The 1905 Queen Anne Revival-style Edwardian mansion at the core of the gallery was designed by the Timaru architect James Turnbull (1864–1947). Its name, pronounced "egg-and-tie", is from the Scottish Gaelic aig an taigh, and means "at home" or "welcome to our home". It was built as a retirement home for Alexander (1832–1920) and Helen Grant (1854–1955), Scottish immigrants who had farmed Gray's Hills Station in the Mackenzie Country; "Aigantighe" was the name of Helen's family estate in Edinburgh.

The Grants lived in Aigantighe for 50 years. Alexander Grant died in July 1920 at the age of 89, and Helen Grant in July 1955 aged 101. Their son James William Grant inherited the house, and at the urging of his sister Jessie Wigley (herself an artist) bequeathed Aigantighe and its grounds to the Timaru City Council in October 1955, to be used as a public art gallery and garden.

On 23 June 1983, the building was classified D by the New Zealand Historic Places Trust (now Heritage New Zealand). When the classification system was changed, the building was designated a Category II historic place.

== Gallery ==
1978 extension

The Aigantighe Art Gallery was opened by the Governor General Sir Willoughby Norrie on 16 August 1956; the previous Timaru Art Gallery consisted of several rooms in the Public Library, run by the Arts Society. In its first ten years the Aigantighe attracted over 50,000 visitors. Its first director was Clifford Brunsden (1909–1969). After Brunsden's unexpected death, Mrs Olive Scott took over as gallary manager until art teacher Ainslie Manson was appointed in 1970. During his term the Friends of the Aigantighe was established in August 1976, with over 200 members at its creation and 400 by the following year. In 1982 Manson was succeeded as director for 20 months by Graham Sanders. Meg Parkin was director from 1983–1996, and Fiona Ciaran 1996–2014. Cara Fitzgerald was appointed in April 2015 after being acting manager following Ciaran's departure.

In 1974 the condition of the house led to speculation it would be demolished, but fundraising began for gallery extension; James Grant had donated £2000 towards an eastern wing in 1964, and in 1975 the City Council added $66,000 and central government $60,000. In September 1978 the new wing opened, containing a foyer, a 200 m^{2} (2,200 sq ft) exhibition space, an office, store room, and workshop. It was designed by Timaru architect Ron Dohig, also the architect of the South Canterbury Museum's Pioneer Hall (1966), with a similar octagonal component as the foyer. A further addition of an office and storeroom, also designed by Dohig, was made to the front of the gallery in 1995.

Sculpture garden

The gallery celebrated its 60th anniversary in 2016, but the following year a structural assessment found the main building, constructed of unreinforced masonry, was 10 per cent of the new earthquake standard, below the legal minimum of 34 per cent, and it was closed for strengthening; the main exhibition hall and foyer remained open. While in 2019 Perkins et al. remarked on the regenerative potential of tourism of the gallery, a 2020 report estimated $9 million of upgrades were needed, one third for strengthening the house gallery, and the rest in the 1978 and 1995 extensions to improve collection storage and climate control (in both storage and exhibition areas). In May 2022, the Council called for tenders for the $3.3 million project to strengthen the house, and an additional $5.2–6.2 million to demolish and replace the two extensions, but no expressions of interest were received, and by December 2022 the cost of strengthening had increased to $3.73 million. Farrell Construction began work in early December 2023, but in March 2024 was delayed eight weeks for half the roof joists to be replaced. The House Gallery was reopened with a garden party weekend on 14–15 December 2024.

== Collection ==
The gallery's initial collection was 84 works from the South Canterbury Arts Society which had been in storage in the Public Library for decades; over the years the Grant and Wigley families continued to donate art to the gallery. The Aigantighe has the third-largest public art collection in the South Island, and includes New Zealand, Pacific, Asian, and European artworks dating from the sixteenth century to the present. Artists represented include Thomas Kennington, Lexden Lewis Pocock, Jessie Wigley (daughter of Alexander and Helen Grant), Elizabeth Kelly, William Wontner, Russell Clark, John Loxton, Lucy Kemp-Welch, Henry John Yeend King, Giuseppe Gambogi, Giovanni Piranesi, Achille Buzzi, Clas Edvard Friström, Charles Collins, William Greene, Charles Worsley, Petrus van der Velden, Archibald Nicoll, Don Binney, and Colin McCahon. In 1977 eight works by the artist James Cook were acquired. At present the collection comprises over 1500 items, with about 10 per cent on display at any point.

== Exhibitions ==
- 2008, April: Lauren Lysaght Outcomes
- 2023,12 August–3 September: Like water by water Carol Anne Bauer, Dilohana Lekamge, Fiona Pardington, Suji Park
- 2024, June: Fiona Pardington Te taha o te rangi (The Edge of the Heavens) photographs of taxidermied birds from the South Canterbury Museum, later exhibited at the 2026 Venice Biennale.
- 1998–1999, 23 January–21 March: Colin McCahon: The Beginning of a Journey
- 1986, July: David Clegg glass and graphics (touring show)
