= Bush regeneration =

Type of ecological restoration in Australia

Bush regeneration, a form of natural area restoration, is the term used in Australia for the ecological restoration of remnant vegetation areas, such as through the minimisation of negative disturbances, both exogenous such as exotic weeds and endogenous such as erosion. It may also attempt to recreate conditions of pre-European arrival, for example by simulating endogenous disturbances such as fire. Bush regeneration attempts to protect and enhance the floral biodiversity in an area by providing conditions conducive to the recruitment and survival of native plants.

== History ==
=== Bradley method ===
In the early 1960s Joan and Eileen Bradley developed a series of weed control techniques through a process of trial and error. Their work was the beginning of minimal disturbance bush regeneration in New South Wales. The Bradley method urges a naturalistic approach by encouraging the native vegetation to self-reestablish. The Bradleys used their method to successfully clear weeds from a 16 hectares (40 acres) reserve in Ashton Park, part of Sydney Harbour National Park, NSW. The process demonstrated that, following a period of consecutive 'follow up' treatments of diminishing time requirement, subsequent maintenance was needed only once or twice a year, mainly in vulnerable spots such as creek banks, roadsides, and clearings, to be maintained weed-free.

The aim of their work was to clear small niches adjacent to healthy native vegetation such that the each area will regenerate from in-situ soil seed banks or be re-colonised and stabilised by the regeneration of native plants, replacing an area previously occupied by weeds. The Bradley method follows three main principles,

1. secure the best areas first;
2. minimise disturbance to the natural conditions (for example, minimise soil disturbance and off-target damage); and
3. do not overclear, let the regenerative ability of the bush set the pace of clearance.

The priority securing of quality vegetation aids in preserving areas of top biodiversity which provide regeneration has potential to expand these areas and reclaim areas as bushland.

=== Modern practice ===
The adoption of minimal disturbance bush regeneration increased in the decades that followed the work of the Bradleys. Their principles have guided bushcare programs in Australia, although the inclusion of herbicide in modern bush regeneration is a notable deviation from the ideals of the Bradley sisters. In addition, rather than 'minimal disturbance', a more favoured and ecologically sound trend since the 1990s has been towards more 'appropriate disturbance' as many Australian plant communities require some level of perturbation to trigger germination from long-buried seed banks. This has led to a range of additional disturbance-based techniques (such as burns and soil disturbance) being included in the regenerator's 'tool kit' in dry forest and grassland areas. Field experience has found that, even in rainforest areas, a resilience to disturbance is evident, enabling regenerators to clear weed in a fairly extensive manner to trigger rainforest recovery. This is borne out by a thriving rainforest regeneration industry in northern NSW Australia, modelled on the pioneering work of John Stockard at Wingham Brush (Stockard 1991, Stockard 1999). The rule of thumb in all cases is to constrain clearing to that area that matches the project's follow up resources.

The increased awareness and consideration of Australia's biodiversity by citizens has incrementally increased pressure on local governments to adopt conservation programs for remnant vegetation on council land. Most peri-urban councils now have some involvement in bush regeneration, either through planning, land management, volunteer support or through employment of bush regeneration practitioners. In NSW the level of coordination of bush regeneration programs through local governments is high, although in some other areas at present a lack of coordination is a serious concern in bush regeneration on public land, with only 40% of councils liaising with other councils. In such areas there may be a need for strategic management at a regional scale through Natural Resource Management Boards or non government organisations such as Trees For Life, which are involved in bushcare programs across wider areas. There is increasing interest in using species traits and the grouping of species by their traits into functional types to both predict plant community responses to environmental change and to address hypothesis about the mechanisms underlying these responses.

== Purposes ==
The aim of bush regeneration, also known as 'natural area restoration', is to restore and maintain ecosystem health by facilitating the natural regeneration of indigenous flora, this is usually achieved by selectively reducing the competitive interaction with invasive species, or mitigation of negative influences such as weeds or erosion. See also Albert Morris.

Invasive plant species are often the greatest threat to remnant vegetation, and therefore bush regeneration is closely associated with weed abatement activities. Weed management as one aim of bush regeneration, is used to increase native plant recruitment. The management of factors such as fire and herbivory can be just as important, depending on the ecosystem being restored. In recent years research and on-ground management has begun to recognise the importance of ecosystem processes rather ecosystem composition and structure and research into other ways of facilitating native plant recruitment is increasing.

== Technique ==
The original Bradley method of bush regeneration focuses on facilitating native plant recruitment from the seedbank, rather than planting seedlings or sowing seeds, as follows:

Weeding a little at a time from the bush towards the weeds takes the pressure off the natives under favourable conditions. Native seeds and spores are ready in the ground and the natural environment favours plants that have evolved in it. The balance is tipped back towards regeneration. Keep it that way, by always working where the strongest area of bush meets the weakest weeds.

Currently the term 'bush regeneration' includes activities other than weed removal, such as replanting and introducing species into an area where soil, water, or fire regimes have shifted the type of plant appropriate to the area (for example, a stormwater drain).

Weed species can be important habitat for native fauna (e.g. blackberry is important habitat for wrens and the southern brown bandicoot) and this should be taken into consideration with bush regeneration, for example by not clearing invasive species until adequate habitat alternatives have been established nearby with native vegetation.

Problems can occur when insufficient follow-up is conducted as the success of bush regeneration is dependent on allowing the native vegetation to regenerate in the area where weeds have been removed.

== List of bushcare groups ==
=== Community-training organisations ===
- Trees For Life
- Campbelltown Council, NSW, Streamcare Group
- San Diego Chapter, California Native Plant Society
- Wild Mountains Trust, Queensland, Australia

=== Reserves with volunteer groups ===
Reserves may have bush regeneration by volunteer groups, including:

- Chilworth Reserve, Beecroft, New South Wales
- George Kendall Riverside Park, New South Wales
- Whites Creek (Annandale), Sydney, New South Wales
- Puckeys Estate Reserve, North Wollongong, New South Wales
- Mermaid Pool, Manly Vale, Sydney, New South Wales
- Redwood Park, Toowoomba, Queensland

== Further references ==
- Brock, Thomas D. (October 2002). "The Bradley Method for Control of Invasive Plants" (PDF). Plants out of Place (pp 5–6). Invasive Plants Association of Wisconsin. Archived from the original (PDF) on 5 April 2004.
- Fuller, T.C.; G.D. Barbe (Fall 1997). "The Bradley Method of Eliminating Exotic Plants From Natural Reserves" (PDF). CALEPPC News (pp 7–8). California Exotic Pest Plant Council.
