= Eoin Young =

New Zealand-born motoring journalist

- Born: Eoin S. Young; 9 June 1939; Cave, New Zealand
- Died: 5 September 2014 (aged 75); Christchurch New Zealand
- Occupations: Motor sport journalist, Author
- Known for: Motor sport biographies Autocar columnist

Eoin S. Young (9 June 1939, Cave, New Zealand – 5 September 2014, Christchurch New Zealand) was a motoring journalist who wrote an Autocar column for some 30 years starting in 1967.

After first working in a bank in Timaru and writing motor sport columns for the Timaru Herald, he moved to the UK in 1961. He initially worked with Denny Hulme for the Formula Junior series in Europe, and then in 1962 he became Bruce McLaren's secretary, ghosting his column for Autosport. In 1964 McLaren founded his own racing organisation, Bruce McLaren Racing Ltd, and appointed Young as director. When McLaren stepped up to Formula 1 in 1966, Young decided to return to journalism full-time. His weekly Formula 1 column with Autocar magazine, ‘From The Grid’, would run for 31 years and be syndicated at its height to seven other magazines worldwide. In 1971 he authored Bruce McLaren's biography, McLaren: The Man and His Racing Team. In 1976 he wrote Against All Odds with James Hunt, the story of the British Formula One driver's only F1 championship,

In 2003, he authored Forza Amon!, a biography of Chris Amon, and in 2007 Memories of the Bear, a biography of Denny Hulme. He wrote columns and articles for many publications including Cars for the Connoisseur (UK), F1 Racing (UK), Victory Lane (USA), On Track (USA), NZ Classic Car (New Zealand), Autosprint (Italy) and Am Klassiek (the Netherlands). He also wrote for the web-based motor sport magazine pitpass.com. He returned to New Zealand and became ill in July 2014; he died on 5 September 2014.

== Selected bibliography ==
- McLaren Memories
- The Amazing Summer of '55: The Year of Motor Racing's Biggest Dramas, Worst Tragedies and Greatest Victories ISBN 1 84425 114 4
- Memories of the Bear: A Biography of Denny Hulme ISBN 9781869505431
- Jim Clark and his most successful Lotus ISBN 1 84425 029 6
- Bruce McLaren: The Man and His Racing Team ISBN 1 85260 511 1
- James Hunt: Against All Odds (by Young, James Hunt and David Hodges) ISBN 9780600352501
- It Beats Working: My Thirty Five Years Inside Motor Racing ISBN 1 85260 460 3
- It Still Beats Working: My Forty Years of Motor Racing Fun ISBN 0 85184 069 8
- Forza Amon!: A Biography of Chris Amon ISBN 1 84425 016 4
- Power and Glory: 1952-73 v. 2: History of Grand Prix Motor Racing (by Young and William Court) ISBN 1 85260 188 4
- Classic Racers: New Zealand's Grand Prix Greats ISBN 1 86950 460 7
