= Charles Talbot =

Charles Talbot may refer to:

- Charles Talbot, 1st Baron Talbot (1685–1737), British lawyer and politician
- Charles Talbot, 1st Duke of Shrewsbury (1660–1718), English statesman
- Charles Talbot Foxcroft (1868–1929), British Conservative Party politician
- Charles Talbot (Royal Navy officer) (1801–1876), British admiral
- Charles Talbot (priest) (1769–1823), English churchman
- Charles John Talbot (1873–1942), Liberal Party Member of Parliament in New Zealand
- Sir Charles Talbot, 2nd Baronet (1751–1812), British politician
