= Richard St. Barbe Baker =

English biologist and environmental activist (1889–1982)

Richard St. Barbe Baker OBE
- St. Barbe Baker in 1932
- Born: 9 October 1889; West End, England
- Died: 9 June 1982 (aged 92); Saskatoon, Canada
- Spouses: Doreen Long (m. 1946; div. 1953) Catriona Burnett (m. 1959)
- Children: 2
- Awards: Honorary Doctor of Laws from the University of Saskatchewan (1971); Order of the British Empire (1978)
- Scientific career
- Fields: Biology, botany

Richard St. Barbe Baker (9 October 1889 – 9 June 1982) was an English biologist and botanist, environmental activist and author, who contributed greatly to worldwide reforestation efforts. As a leader, he founded an organisation, Men of the Trees, still active today as the International Tree Foundation, whose many chapters carry out reforestation internationally.

== Life and work ==
=== Early years ===
He was born on 9 October 1889 in West End, Hampshire, to John Richard St. Barbe Baker and Charlotte Purrott. He was brother of Thomas Guillaume St. Barbe Baker. Another brother James Scott St. Barbe Baker, followed Baker to Canada, applied for a neighbouring homestead and applied for work in Electrical Engineering working on Saskatoon's early electrical streetcars until World War I broke out. Besides these two brothers, Baker had three sisters, the eldest, Charlotte Martha b. 6 January 1888 died in infancy. Baker was descended from lines of farmers, parsons and evangelists, with the occasional adventurer amongst his forebears as well. As a very young child he was attracted to gardening and, since the family's Beacon Hill home was surrounded by a wood, he began to explore the forest at a fairly early age. He became very adept at manual work and harboured a lifelong belief in its value.

St. Barbe Baker's father wanted him to enter the ministry, so at 13 he was sent to Dean Close School, a boarding school in Cheltenham, where he became interested in the sciences of botany and forestry. A clergyman recently returned from Canada appealed to his religious heritage and suggested that the young man prepare himself for missionary work in the western region of that country. Not only was Baker inspired by Exton Lloyd, but his imagination was fired by tales from his great Uncle Richard Baker who had previously travelled to Canada. Baker's voyage took place in 1910, sailing the Atlantic Ocean and heading far inland, where he lived in rough-hewn conditions on his homestead quarter North West section 25 township 34 range 6 west of the third meridian near Beaver Creek, Saskatchewan. Baker was devoted to studies that would earn him a diploma from Emmanuel College, University of Saskatchewan. Doing evangelical work, Baker travelled widely on horseback from his homestead [which he later abandoned] around the area attending to his ministry as well as to the university for classes. Working for a short while as a logger in the Prince Albert Lumber Camps he became convinced that the wanton waste of timber and agricultural practices (including the razing of the natural scrub trees) by European settlers were leading to deplorable soil degradation and potential aridity on Canada's prairies.

When World War I intervened, he served in France with Royal Horse Artillery (RHA) units and was wounded on three occasions. After discharge, he worked in the British Government's social services for a period. Following World War I Baker returned to England to study at Ridley Hall, Cambridge.

=== Work in Africa ===
St. Barbe Baker soon resumed studies at Cambridge in biology, botany. He had realised through observation that deforestation, resulting from the removal of trees without sufficient reforestation, results in soil-loss problems, declines in habitat and biodiversity, declines in availability of wood for fuel and industrial use, and reduction in quality of life.

Graduating from the Cambridge botany programme, he applied for work in British-ruled Kenya. In North Africa he saw the effects of centuries of land mismanagement, first from wheat farming in the later days of the Roman Empire and after that from the grazing of goats first introduced by Arabs. Immediately concerned with these deforestation problems, in 1922 he set up a tree nursery and founded an organisation with Kenya's Kikuyu people to carry out managed reforestation in the region, utilising native species. In the regional dialect, the local society was called "Watu wa Miti". This formed the foundation for what was to become an international organisation, the Men of the Trees (a translation of the original name).

He left Kenya in 1924 and went back to England. After giving a talk at the First Congress of Living Religions within the Commonwealth, (alternatively within the British Empire he was approached by Claudia Stewart Coles, who introduced him to the Baháʼí Faith because of the way he had approached a living religion among the tribes there in formulating the Men of the Trees; St. Barbe Baker studied this religion and embraced it shortly after (in 1924). See Baháʼí Faith in Kenya.

He then returned to Africa, where he was appointed Assistant Conservator of Forests [ACF] for the southern provinces of Nigeria from 1925 to 1929; he went on to do work similar to his work in Kenya. He also did forestry planning work in the Gold Coast. During this time, he devoted himself in part to a study of the ecology of extremely complex tropical forests. However, an incident occurred in which he defended an African man against abuse by a British official and, thereby running afoul of the Colonial Office, he was discharged from his duties.

=== Work in Palestine ===
He attended the First World Forestry Congress in Rome and then went on to work in Palestine and set up a chapter of the Men of the Trees there. There he met and won the support of Shoghi Effendi, then head of the Baháʼí Faith, who became the first life member of the Men of the Trees in Palestine. This support led to the backing of Muslim, Jewish and Christian leaders for a programme of reforestation in Palestine.

=== Work in America ===
Traveling to America, where he crossed the country and toured the Redwood groves on the West Coast, St. Barbe Baker became an author and sought-after lecturer, and received laudatory national attention from popular radio host Lowell Thomas. Returning to England via Australia, his thoughts returned to California and he became involved in the Save the Redwoods campaign. Sir Francis Younghusband, first president of the British chapter of the Men of the Trees, championed the cause in the UK. St. Barbe Baker's connections with the United States remained strong, and in the late 1930s he worked with President Franklin D. Roosevelt to establish the American Civilian Conservation Corps (CCC), said eventually to involve some six million youths.

=== Establishment of the Men of the Trees ===
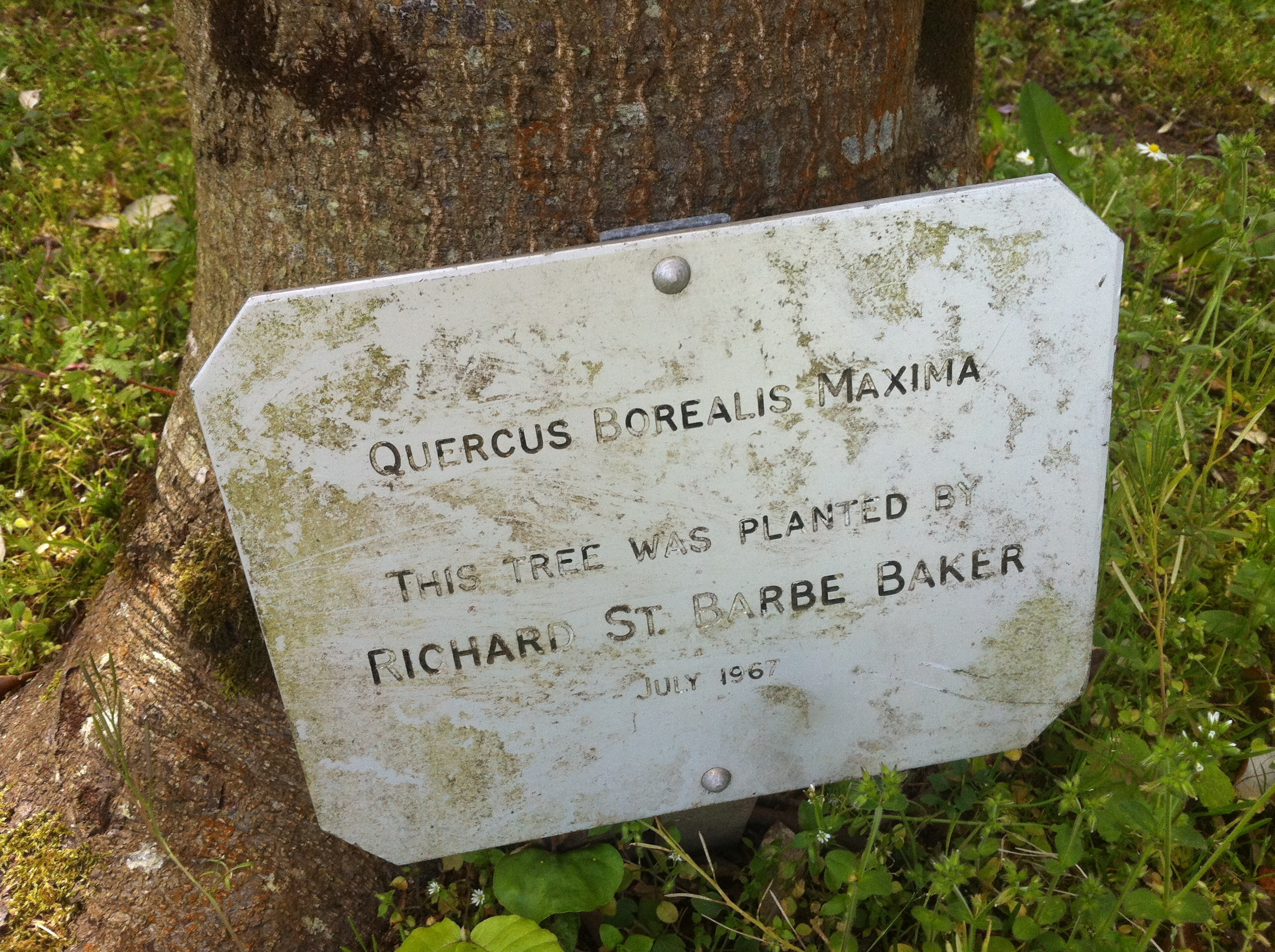
Plaque marking a tree planted by St Barbe Baker in Powerscourt, Enniskerry, Ireland

In good part because of St. Barbe Baker's continued travels, chapters of his organisation, the Men of the Trees (now the International Tree Foundation in the UK), were founded internationally. After World War II, a lecture tour into Austria, Germany and other countries launched his concept of an international Green Front to promote the idea of reforestation worldwide. Probably the largest single challenge that he addressed himself to was the concept of gradually reclaiming the Sahara Desert through the strategic planting of trees. This idea took shape after a 25,000-mile expedition around the desert (through 24 countries), which he undertook with a team in 1952–3. This idea is now being planned by the African Union as part of the Great Green Wall project.

St. Barbe Baker's organisation, the Men of the Trees, eventually grew to be known as the International Tree Foundation. Ultimately, there were chapters in over 100 countries. By some estimates, organisations he founded or assisted have been responsible for planting at least 26 trillion trees, internationally. St. Barbe Baker is grouped as one of three progenitors, along with Sir Robert McCarrison and Sir Albert Howard, of the organic agriculture movement.

He married his secretary, Doreen Long, in the church of St Mary's, Puncknowle, on 23 January 1946. They had two children: Angela, born 1946, and Paul, born 1949. They divorced in 1953. In 1959 he moved to New Zealand and married Catriona Burnett on 8 October 1959 at St. David's Memorial Church in Cave. Her late father was the MP Thomas Burnett. They lived at Mount Cook Station, her family's sheep station, located on the east side of Lake Pukaki.

St. Barbe Baker was a vegetarian. The International Tree Foundation have described him as a "leading advocate for a plant-based diet."

=== Other awards ===
St. Barbe Baker received the honorary degree of Doctor of Laws on 6 November 1971 from the University of Saskatchewan. This honour was followed by an appointment bestowed by Queen Elizabeth II as Officer of the Order of the British Empire (OBE) in the 1978 New Year Honours.

=== Death and legacy ===
St. Barbe Baker died on 9 June 1982 while visiting Saskatoon, Saskatchewan where he is buried at Woodlawn Cemetery. The following day the Universal House of Justice cabled:

PASSING DISTINGUISED DEDICATED SERVANT HUMANITY RICHARD ST BARBE BAKER LOSS TO ENTIRE WORLD AND TO BAHAI COMMUNITY AN OUTSTANDING SERVANT SPOKESMAN FAITH. HIS DEVOTION BELOVED GUARDIAN [ Shoghi Effendi ] NEVER CEASING EFFORTS BEST INTERESTS MANKIND MAERITORIOUS EXAMPLE.

Just days before his death he planted his last tree on the grounds of the University of Saskatchewan, and he was working on his thirty-first book. A memorial marker dedicated by Meewasin Valley Authority and the Saskatoon Bahá'í community honours Baker's last tree planting on World Environment Day 5 June 1982 and the interpretive sign pays tribute to the legacy of tree planting initiated internationally by Richard St. Barbe Baker. Saskatoon City Council in 1979 celebrated the achievement and distinction of Baker naming the afforestation area preserved in perpetuity in Saskatoon [south of the CNR station] in his honour ~ the Richard St. Barbe Baker Afforestation Area. Richard St. Barbe Baker's papers, manuscripts, personal correspondence, forestry and conservation activities, photographs and fonds are preserved at the University of Saskatchewan Archives and Special Collections room. Baker Road in the Rural Municipality of Corman Park No. 344 is located near the two homestead lands of Richard St. Barbe Baker and his brother James Scott St. Barbe Baker.

A memorial to St. Barbe Baker was unveiled in his birth village of West End in Hampshire in March 2003. The memorial includes a bronze bas-relief image of St. Barbe Baker sculpted by Jill Tweed, set in granite atop a Portland stone column. There is also a street in the village named Barbe Baker Avenue.

=== Baháʼí Faith ===
Richard St. Barbe Baker was referred to by Shoghi Effendi, the Guardian of the Bahá'í Faith, as "the first member of the English gentry to join the Bahá'í Faith." David Hofman, a British Bahá'í who served on the Universal House of Justice, said of St. Barbe Baker's acceptance of the Bahá'í Faith (shortly after 1924): "He always said that this was the beginning of his true life, and he realised that he derived so much benefit from these Baháʼí prayers that it was only fair that he should serve the Baháʼí Faith to the best of his ability." Mr. Hofman has also said that, "... he spread knowledge of the Faith wherever he went and was greatly admired by Shoghi Effendi for his dedication to the cause of humanity."

== Bibliography ==
Baker published over 20 books during his lifetime.

- Richard St. Barbe Baker (1985) [1970]. My Life, My Trees (2nd ed.). Forres: Findhorn. ISBN 0-905249-63-1.
- Richard St. Barbe Baker (2010) Tall Timber
- Richard St. Barbe Baker (1989,1993) Man of the Trees: Selected Writings of Richard St. Barbe Baker
- Richard St. Barbe Baker (1981) Trees for Health and Longevity
- Richard St. Barbe Baker (1974) Famous Trees of Bible Lands
- Richard St. Barbe Baker (1979) My Life, My Trees
- Richard St. Barbe Baker (1969) Caravan Story and Country Notebook
- Richard St. Barbe Baker (1966) Sahara Conquest
- Richard St. Barbe Baker (1965) Famous Trees of New Zealand
- Richard St. Barbe Baker (1962) Horse Sense; Horses in War and Peace
- Richard St. Barbe Baker (1958) Kamiti: A forester's dream
- Richard St. Barbe Baker (1957) Why I am a Vegetarian
- Richard St. Barbe Baker (1965) The True Book About Trees
- Richard St. Barbe Baker (1956) Dance of the Trees, The Adventures of a Forester
- Richard St. Barbe Baker (1956) Sahara Conquest
- Richard St. Barbe Baker (1956) Land of Tane : The Threat of Erosion. Lutterworth Press: London
- Richard St. Barbe Baker (1955) Kabongo: The Story of a Kikuyu Chief.
- Richard St. Barbe Baker (1954) Sahara Challenge
- Richard St. Barbe Baker (1952) Famous Trees
- Richard St. Barbe Baker (1949) Tambours Africains
- Richard St. Barbe Baker (1949) Green Glory -the forests of the World
- Richard St. Barbe Baker (1948) Trees, a reader's guide
- Richard St. Barbe Baker (1948) Trees: a book of the seasons.
- Richard St. Barbe Baker (1944) I Planted Trees. Lutterworth Press: London and Redhill
- Richard St. Barbe Baker (1943) The Redwoods
- Richard St. Barbe Baker (1942) African Drums. George Ronald Press: Wheatley and Oxford
- Richard St. Barbe Baker (1940) Trees.
- Richard St. Barbe Baker (1935) Magic in the Woods
- Richard St. Barbe Baker (1935) Among the Trees, (men of the Trees)
- Richard St. Barbe Baker (1931) The Brotherhood of the Trees
- Richard St. Barbe Baker (1931) Men of the Trees in the Mahogany Forests of Kenya and Nigeria
