= Trees For Life (Australia) =

Charity

- Formation: 1981
- Type: Conservation charity
- Region served: South Australia
- Volunteers: 2000
- Website: treesforlife.org.au
- Formerly called: SA Branch of Men of the Trees

Trees For Life is a registered charity that protects and restores land in the bush, farms, and urban areas of South Australia. It runs many programs, the oldest involving volunteers growing seeds into small plants for planting by farmers and other landholders. It was formed in 1981 and now has 2000 volunteers.

== Activities ==
The oldest and flagship Trees For Life program is the Tree Scheme. Landholders and farmers willing to plant trees, shrubs and grasses to revegetate their properties are matched with volunteers who grow the plants from seeds. There are around 500 such volunteers as of 2020. Seeds are collected from 42 zones around South Australia and tracked so that the seedlings can be planted near where the seeds were collected, maintaining genetic diversity. Plantations may expand remnants of native vegetation, as well as create new forests, form windbreaks and control erosion.

Since 1994, the Bush For Life program has focused on protecting and restoring existing bushland. Volunteers are trained to identify and remove weeds, conserving over 300 sites covering more than 4,000 hectares (10,000 acres).

Other Trees For Life programs involve direct seeding of large land areas, protecting the south-eastern red-tailed black cockatoo and silver daisy, helping people connect with local natural areas, offsetting carbon, and running the Westwood Nursery.

== History ==
Trees For Life was established in 1981 two weeks after a visit from Richard St. Barbe Baker, the founder of the International Tree Foundation, then known as Men of the Trees. It was originally the South Australian branch of Men of the Trees, and became Trees For Life two years later. The first tree was planted in 1982 at One Tree Hill.

By 2001, Trees For Life was one of the largest volunteer producers of native seedlings in the world, having grown 20 million seedlings; 1.5 million small trees were being grown by almost 2000 volunteers each year. 201 species were being grown including melaleucas, acacias, she-oaks, and all major eucalypts. Over half the species were understory plants such as shrubs and ground covers.

Trees For Life was granted registered charity status on 3 December 2012.

The number of seedlings produced reached 32 million by 2015. That year, 850 landholders placed orders, and had to pay around 15c per plant tube, compared to the retail price of A$2.50.

In 2018, Trees For Life had sustained a 30 percent reduction in federal government funding from the Natural Heritage Trust via the National Landcare Program, and state government funding had also been reduced. This threatened projects such as the Paddock Trees Project which, in partnership with the Adelaide and Mt Lofty Natural Resources Management Board and under advice from ornithologists, was revegetating land from Strathalbyn to Gawler.

In 2020, it was announced that Trees For Life will co-ordinate and deliver all 6,500 tree plantings of the A$1.2 million Bushfire Recovery Paddock Tree Project. This would restore areas of the Adelaide Hills damaged by bushfire in December 2019, providing habitat for the brown treecreeper and diamond firetail birds, as well as benefiting agriculture. Also in 2020, it was announced that Trees For Life would be a partner in a $3 million Revitalising Private Conservation in South Australia program, which provides grants to landholders with a Heritage Agreement.

== See also ==
- Trees for Life (Scotland) – an unaffiliated charity that also uses volunteers for environmental restoration
