= Raphaël Arlettaz =

Swiss conservation biologist and ecologist

- Born: August 28, 1961 (age 65); Sion, Valais, Switzerland
- Citizenship: Swiss
- Education: University of Fribourg; University of Lausanne; University of Bern
- Known for: Conservation of threatened species; ecosystem restoration; biodiversity-friendly land management
- Awards: Laureate of La Science appelle les Jeunes (1982); Laureate of the Fonds Jeunesse, Caisse d'Epargne (1986); Prof. Henri A. Guénin Prize (1995); Prof. Schläfli Prize (1996); Research Medal of the Association for the Study of Animal Behaviour (1997); Kolenati’s award (1998); Elisabeth Rentschler Stiftung Prize (2001)
- Scientific career
- Fields: Conservation biology; ecology; restoration ecology
- Workplaces: University of Bern; Swiss Ornithological Institute

Raphaël Arlettaz (born 28 August 1961) is a Swiss conservation biologist, restoration ecologist, and professor at the University of Bern. He is known for his research on the ecology and conservation of threatened species, the restoration of degraded ecosystems, and his role in bridging academic research and applied biodiversity management in Switzerland and internationally.

== Early life and education ==
Arlettaz was born in Sion, in the canton of Valais, Switzerland, and grew up in the nearby village of Fully. He studied at the University of Fribourg, earning a diploma's degree in natural sciences. He completed his doctoral studies in biology at the University of Lausanne in 1994, with a dissertation on the ecology of sibling mouse-eared bats Myotis myotis and Myotis blythii, analysing their zoogeography, niche partitioning and foraging ecology.

== Academic career ==
Following his doctoral work, Arlettaz held research and teaching positions at the Swiss Ornithological Institute and the University of Lausanne, and completed postdoctoral research supported by the Swiss National Science Foundation at the Universities of Lausanne, Aberdeen, Bristol and Erlangen-Nüremberg. In 2001 he was appointed full professor of Conservation Biology at the University of Bern, where he became head of the Division of Conservation Biology and co-director of the Institute of Ecology and Evolution. He also served as acting director of the institute from 2008 to 2010 and as acting director of the Department of Biology in 2019–2020.

In addition to his university work, Arlettaz founded and co-directed the Valais Field Station of the Swiss Ornithological Institute (2000–2012), which focuses on monitoring and applied conservation of endangered farmland, forest and Alpine birds. He was also the founder of the Valais Bat Network (1979), the Groupe Ornithologique Valaisan (1981), the Bearded Vulture Network Western Switzerland (1987) and Fauna.vs (1997), the Valais association of wildlife biologists, which he led for years. He is also the founder of the Valais Nature Foundation (2026). His dual engagement in academia and hands-on conservation has been noted for effectively linking research with on-the-ground biodiversity management.

== Research ==
Arlettaz's research integrates population biology, behavioural ecology, community ecology, population dynamics, eco-physiology and landscape management to address conservation problems across farmland, forest, river, and Alpine ecosystems. Early in his career, he investigated the trophic ecology, acoustic behaviour and host-parasite relationships of European bats, publishing influential work on niche differentiation, foraging strategies, and eco-physiology.

Since joining the University of Bern, his group has carried out extensive comparative and experimental research on biodiversity-friendly management, particularly in agricultural landscapes such as grasslands, vineyards and fruit tree plantations. He demonstrated that conventional agri-environmental schemes in Europe often fail to sustain insectivorous vertebrates such as birds and bats because of insufficient prey availability, notably due to limited accessibility of foraging habitats following agricultural intensification. His real site-scale, full factorial and controlled grassland experiments showed that delaying mowing and maintaining uncut refuges can dramatically increase invertebrate abundance and benefit higher trophic levels, findings that have influenced Swiss and European agri-environmental policy and practice.

Other projects have extended to the conservation of Alpine wildlife and the effects of land-use change, climate destruction and recreation (stress ecology) on mountain bird populations. Additional research areas include riverine restoration, forest biodiversity management, predator–prey relationships (apex carnivores and their ungulate prey), population dynamics of birds and bats, and the ecological impacts of renewable energy infrastructure, notably wind turbines, on bats and birds.

He is the author of more than 220 publications in international peer-reviewed journals, several dozens of chapters in collective books, more than 50 scientific notes and numerous outreach articles. His public engagement includes interviews in newspapers, radio and television in French, German, English and Spanish, as well as frequent lectures to scientific and general audiences.

== Awards and recognition ==
Arlettaz has received numerous awards for his scientific contributions, including the Prof. Henri A. Guénin Prize (University of Lausanne, 1995) and the Prof. Schläfli Prize (Swiss Academy of Science, 1996) for his doctoral work, as well as the Research Medal of the Association for the Study of Animal Behaviour (1997) and the Elisabeth Rentschler Stiftung Prize for Animal Protection (2001). He has also been a laureate of the Swiss Youth Science (1982) and other prizes in Switzerland and abroad.

In 2015 he served as an author for the Europe and Central Asia assessment of the Intergovernmental Science-Policy Platform on Biodiversity and Ecosystem Services (IPBES). He has been continuously funded by the Swiss National Science Foundation since the mid-1990s, mostly for applied research projects.

== Selected publications ==
- Arlettaz, Raphael; Perrin, Nicolas; Hausser, Jacques (1997). "Trophic Resource Partitioning and Competition between the Two Sibling Bat Species Myotis myotis and Myotis blythii". The Journal of Animal Ecology. 66 (6): 897. Bibcode:1997JAnEc..66..897A. doi:10.2307/6005. ISSN 0021-8790. JSTOR 6005.
- Arlettaz, Raphael (1999). "Habitat selection as a major resource partitioning mechanism between the two sympatric sibling bat speciesMyotis myotisandMyotis blythii". Journal of Animal Ecology. 68 (3): 460–471. Bibcode:1999JAnEc..68..460A. doi:10.1046/j.1365-2656.1999.00293.x. ISSN 0021-8790.
- Arlettaz, Raphael; Ruchet, Catherine; Aeschimann, John; Brun, Edmond; Genoud, Michel; Vogel, Peter (2000). "Physiological Traits Affecting the Distribution and Wintering Strategy of the Bat Tadarida teniotis". Ecology. 81 (4): 1004. doi:10.2307/177174. ISSN 0012-9658. JSTOR 177174.
- Arlettaz, Raphaël; Jones, Gareth; Racey, Paul A. (2001). "Effect of acoustic clutter on prey detection by bats". Nature. 414 (6865): 742–745. Bibcode:2001Natur.414..742A. doi:10.1038/414742a. ISSN 0028-0836. PMID 11742397.
- Arlettaz, Raphaël; Nusslé, Sébastien; Baltic, Marjana; Vogel, Peter; Palme, Rupert; Jenni-Eiermann, Susanne; Patthey, Patrick; Genoud, Michel (2015). "Disturbance of wildlife by outdoor winter recreation: allostatic stress response and altered activity–energy budgets". Ecological Applications. 25 (5): 1197–1212. Bibcode:2015EcoAp..25.1197A. doi:10.1890/14-1141.1. ISSN 1051-0761. PMID 26485949.
- Arlettaz, Raphaël; Chapron, Guillaume; Kéry, Marc; Klaus, Elisabeth; Mettaz, Stéphane; Roder, Stefanie; Vignali, Sergio; Zimmermann, Fridolin; Braunisch, Veronika (2021-06-07). "Poaching Threatens the Establishment of a Lynx Population, Highlighting the Need for a Centralized Judiciary Approach". Frontiers in Conservation Science. 2 665000. Bibcode:2021FrCS....2.5000A. doi:10.3389/fcosc.2021.665000. ISSN 2673-611X.
