= South Canterbury Museum =

Museum in Timaru, New Zealand

Te Kura Marumaru South Canterbury Museum
- Pioneer Hall
- Former name: South Canterbury History Museum
- Established: 1952; 74 years ago
- Location: Perth Street, Timaru, New Zealand
- Coordinates: 44°23′50″S 171°15′04″E
- Director: Philip Howe
- Website: museum.timaru.govt.nz

Te Kura Marumaru South Canterbury Museum is a museum located in Timaru, New Zealand operated by the Timaru District Council. Its collection encompasses natural history, Māori history, European settlement, and recent social history. The museum houses a replica of the aeroplane local inventor Richard Pearse built and experimented with.

== Early attempts ==
The discovery of a human skeleton in the sands of Saltwater Creek in 1875 prompted the Timaru Herald to call for a museum for the town. By 1884 a collection including geological specimens collected by Haast were being housed at Timaru High School. A committee was formed in 1883 including Moss Jonas, later mayor of Timaru, which made an approach to the Minister of Lands to have land gazetted as a museum site; this was unsuccessful. The discovery in October 1894 of moa bones at Kapua near Waimate, which went to Canterbury Museum, prompted further calls for a museum.

== First museum ==
Thomas Burnett's house on Perth Street, later the original South Canterbury Historical Museum

The first step towards a museum was the founding of the South Canterbury Historical Society in 1941. Although it had no building to display collections, the Timaru Public Library offered to house early records. Later that year came the bequest of land and two houses on Perth Street from the estate of Thomas David Burnett, former National Party MP for Temuka. Burnett left his property to the Timaru Borough Council for the purposes of a museum, with the wish that the location be called Pioneer Hill, and any new museum built on the site be named Pioneer Hall. The Historical Society took over converting two rooms of Turnbull's former Perth Street house into a museum, with a £300 grant from the Internal Affairs Department and some rent money from the property which the Council had accumulated. The South Canterbury Historical Museum opened to the public on 20 December 1952, but soon realised its two rooms were too small to house all the Society's collections. A new museum building was suggested, commemorating the upcoming centenary of Timaru in 1959.

== Pioneer Hall ==
Fourteen years of fundraising followed, including contributions from private donors, the Golden Kiwi Lottery fund, and the South Canterbury Centennial fund. The South Canterbury Historical Society eventually raised £48,500 for a purpose-built museum building on the Perth Street site. The old house was demolished in January 1965.

Timaru architect Ronald L. Dohig designed a distinctive modern octagonal building with extensive use of glass and tin sheeting. An octagonal glazed mezzanine floor encircled the building, and its pinnacle was a skylight echoing the spire of neighbouring St Mary's Church. Burnett's request was honoured by naming the building "Pioneer Hall" when it opened on 10 December 1966. The opening displays included a roped-off recreation of a period Victorian room in the centre of the building.

Interior of museum

The South Canterbury Historical Society operated the museum, supported by the Council, but in 1988 a deed transferred the ownership of the museum and its collections to the Timaru District Council.

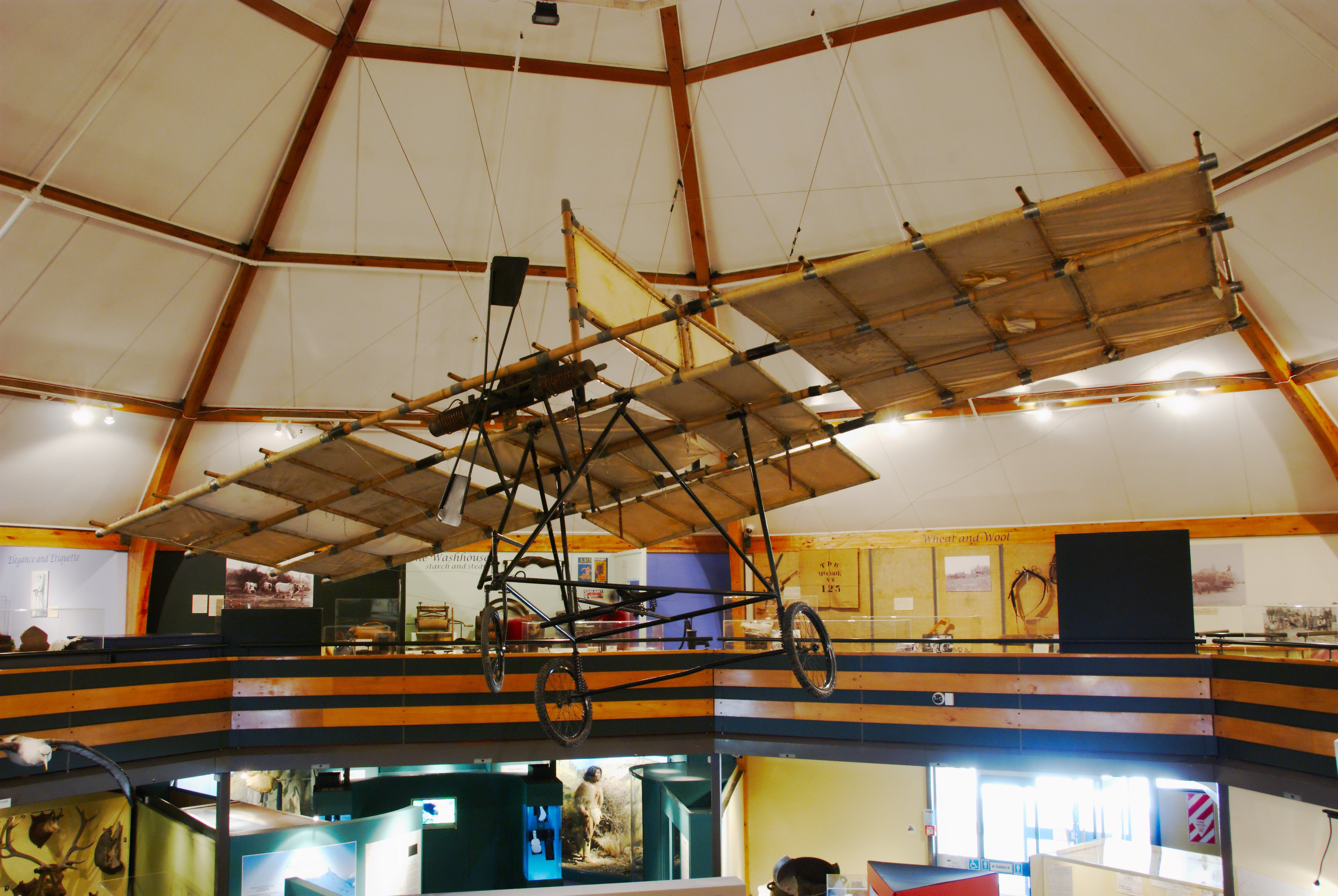
Replica of Richard Pearse's aeroplane

Pioneer Hall had some deficiencies as a museum building: access for people and large collection objects was difficult, and the octagonal shape led to oddly-shaped displays. Its internal climate was difficult to control: Director Philip Howe began working in the building in February 1989, and in winter, "realised just how cold the building could get with poor insulation and heating."

A three-storey extension to the south of the building was built in 1999–2000, and contained insulated collection storage, a workshop with materials storage, and curatorial workspaces.

The museum recorded over 28,000 users—physical visitors and enquiries—in 2024, its highest ever number (up from 6300 visitors in 1989) and roughly equivalent to the population of Timaru.

== Renaming and new building ==
In 2025 the Timaru District Council launched a $47 million project to redevelop the Theatre Royal, an associated laneway, and a new museum building on Barnard Street, a block away from Pioneer Hall. The construction company Hawkins won the project in January 2026, with a 31 December planned completion date. In May 2026 Te Rūnanga o Arowhenua gifted the museum a Māori name, Te Kura Marumaru, meaning "the sheltered treasures".

The budget for the new building's main exhibition was $2 million, and by September 2026 three quarters of that had been raised, with the help of a $80,000 grant from Ahu Community Trust.

On 26 October 2026, 60 years after it opened, Pioneer Hall closed its doors in preparation for the move to the new building in April 2027. The Perth Street building would remain as a collection storage facility to house publicly-accessible archives.
