= Thomas Burnett (New Zealand politician) =

New Zealand politician

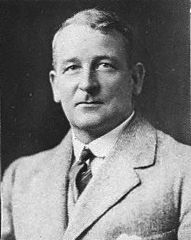
Thomas Burnett in 1935

Thomas David Burnett (25 November 1877 – 30 November 1941) was a New Zealand politician of the Reform Party, and joined the National Party after the 1935 election.

== Early life ==
Burnett's parents were Andrew Burnett and Catherine Burnett from Strathnaver in the Scottish Highlands, with the locality named after the river of the same name. His parents arrived in Canterbury, New Zealand in 1861 and proceeded to the Mackenzie Basin. In May 1864, they selected the Mount Cook Station, so named after the adjacent mountain, and developed it into a sheep station.

Burnett was born on 25 November 1877, according to the contemporary advertisement, at the "residence" of the Burnetts. Later sources record his place of birth as Timaru or Cave (some 23 kilometres or 14 miles north-west of Timaru), The Burnetts had eight children and to provide better access to education, they purchased land in Cave in 1873 and built a homestead there. To be even closer to the schools in Timaru, Andrew Burnett had a home built in Timaru's Perth Street in 1876; this house became the South Canterbury Museum after Thomas Burnett's death.

Burnett received his education at Timaru Main Primary and Timaru Boys' High School.

== Farming ==
Upon leaving school, Burnett worked on Mount Cook Station, which he inherited on his father's death in 1927. In late 2015, the property was for the first time put up for sale, after 151 years in family ownership.

== Political career ==
New Zealand Parliament
Years	Term	Electorate	Party
1919–1922	20th	Temuka	Reform
1922–1925	21st	Temuka	Reform
1925–1928	22nd	Temuka	Reform
1928–1931	23rd	Temuka	Reform
1931–1935	24th	Temuka	Reform
1935–1936	25th	Temuka	Reform
1936–1938	Changed allegiance to:		National
1938–1941	26th	Temuka	National

Burnett was for some years a member of the Mackenzie County Council. In the 1919 election, he challenged Charles Talbot of the Liberal Party, the incumbent in the Temuka electorate. Burnett was successful, with a narrow majority of 31 votes, a 0.47% margin.

He represented the rural Temuka electorate until his death in 1941.

In 1935, he was awarded the King George V Silver Jubilee Medal.

== Community involvement ==
TD was an advocate of extensive tree planting on a bare landscape and there is an unusual and well-known inscription to that effect on the Burkes Pass monument. In about 1918, Burnett had the memorial built with the wording “Ye who enter the portals of the Mackenzie to found homes, take the word of a child of the misty gorges and plant forest trees for your lives, so shall your mountain facings and river flats be preserved for your children’s children and for evermore – 1917.” A century later the creep of wilding pines from Mount Cook Station into the surrounding country would have brought no joy to him. He paid for another memorial at the Mackenzie Pass to commemorate outlaw James Mackenzie who drove a mob of stolen sheep through the pass and thereby became the first European to explore what became the Mackenzie Country. He had St. David's Memorial Church built in Cave. As the instigator of the Downlands Water Supply he won wide praise for a scheme that provided a reliable water supply to the hill country west of Timaru, known as Downlands. The £200,000 project, built between 1938 and 1940, takes water from the Tengawai River and disperses it through 1,400 kilometres of pipes. The Burnett's Cave property, Aorangi, is opposite the St David's Church. The grand gates were built during the 1933 depression by Charlie Groves and illustrate the class structure of the time, with a main gate for the residents and separate side gates, one for English workers, the other for Irish workers. It was perhaps a joke. A memorial to the work of T.D.Burnett along the road near Cave says” “Erected by grateful ratepayers to commemorate the work of THOMAS DAVID BURNETT in fostering the Downlands Water Supply. Here weary beasts shall drink for many a day, Here travellers shall rest beside the way, And think upon the man whose wise forethought Such lasting work of loving kindness wrought. As he once stood, his monument shall stand, A steadfast witness in a changing land."

TD died in 1941 and is buried on a hill slope on Mount Cook Station. The coffin was moved by dray then manhandled to Rock Etam where the gravesite overlooks the majestic Tasman Valley. TD was a big man and the coffin was lead-lined. A cairn marks the spot.

== Family and death ==
His mother died on 9 July 1914 after a short illness. His father died in September 1927. Thomas Burnett died on 30 November 1941, survived by his wife, his son and his daughter Catriona. His daughter married the silviculturist Richard St. Barbe Baker in 1959.

New Zealand Parliament
Preceded by Charles John Talbot	Member of Parliament for Temuka; 1919–1941	Succeeded by Jack Acland
