= Revegetation =

Process of rebuilding disturbed soil

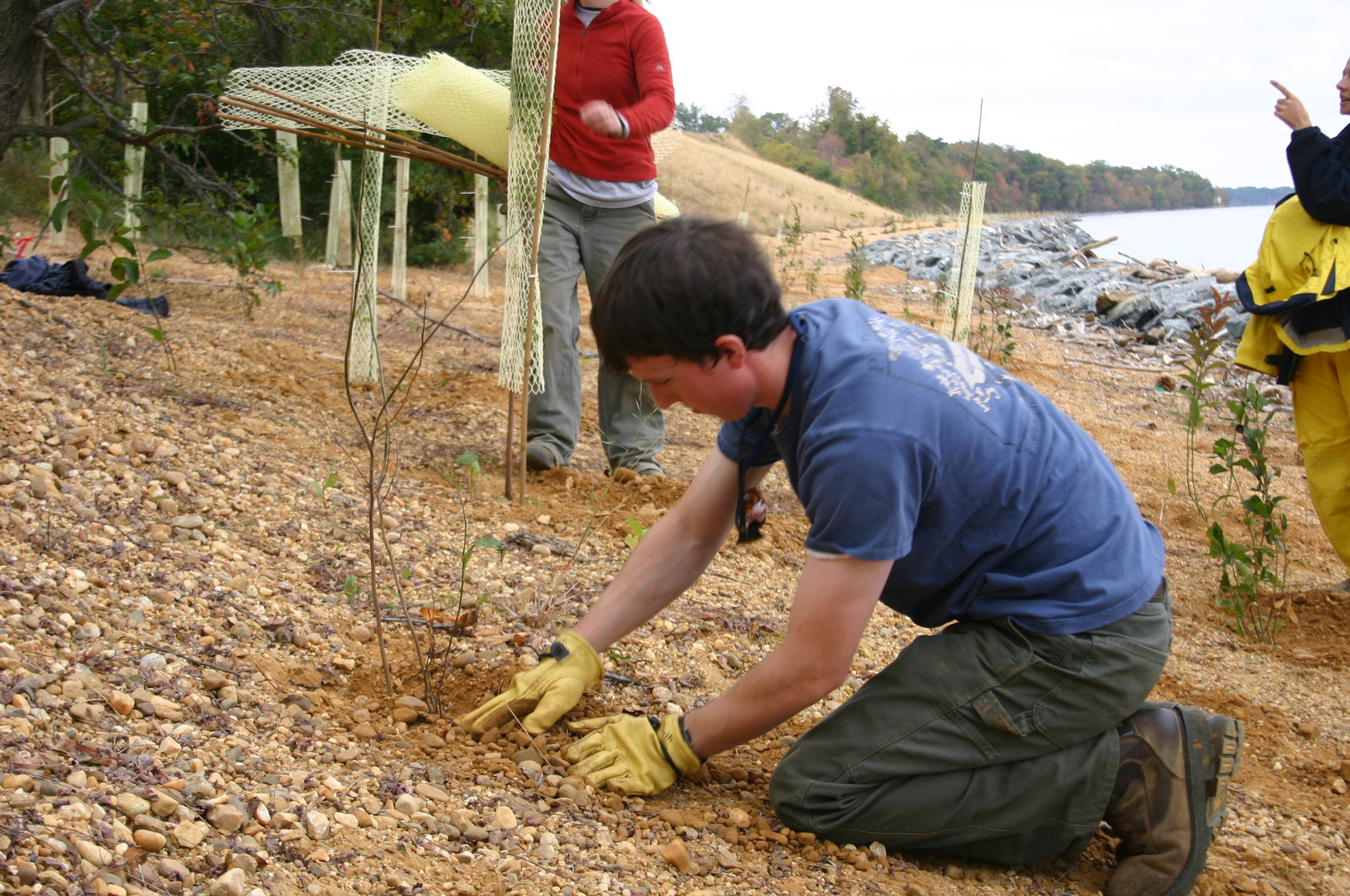
Revegetation on the banks of the Potomac River, USA

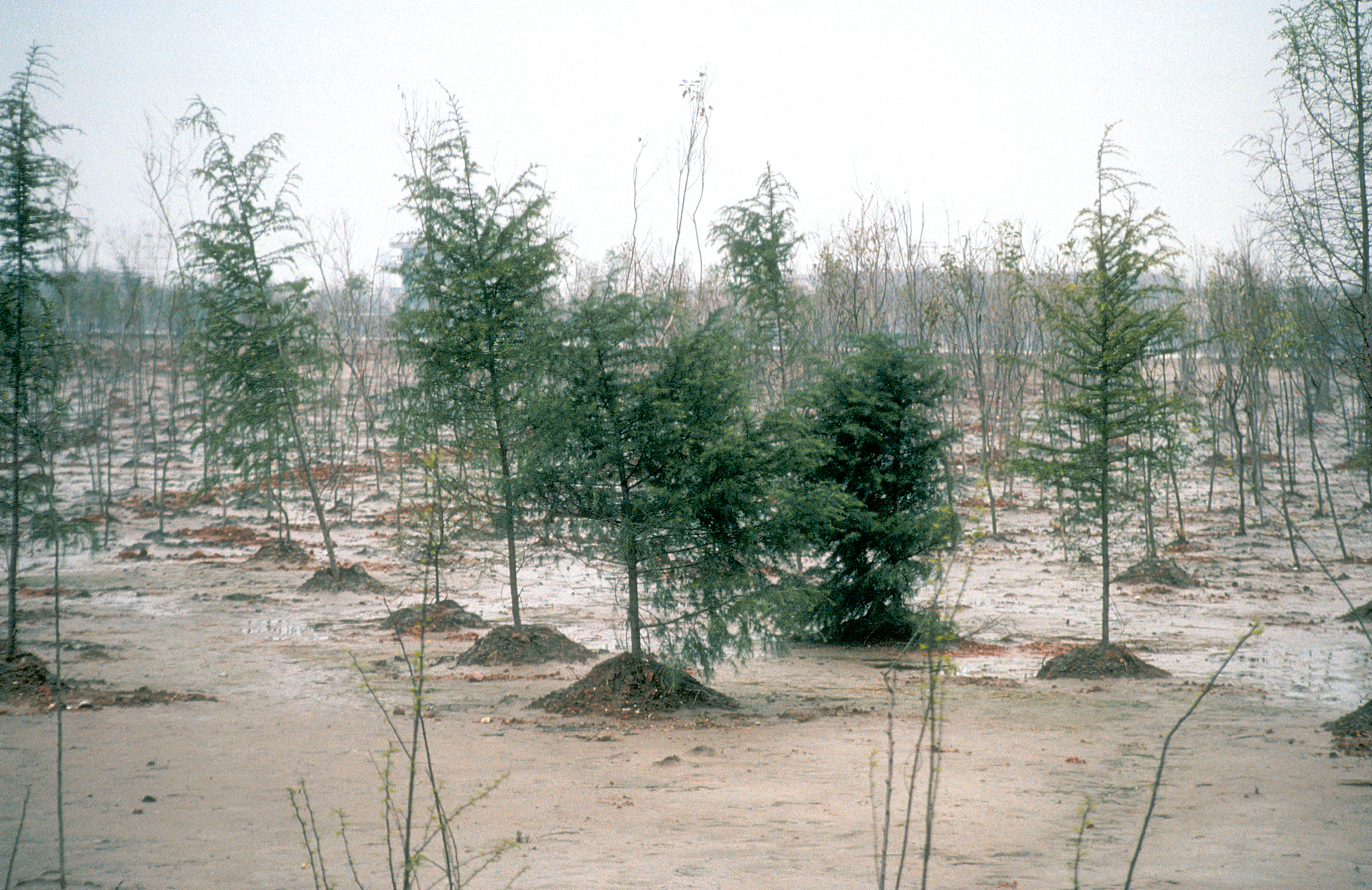
CSIRO ScienceImage 4361 Revegetation of degraded site northern China 1991

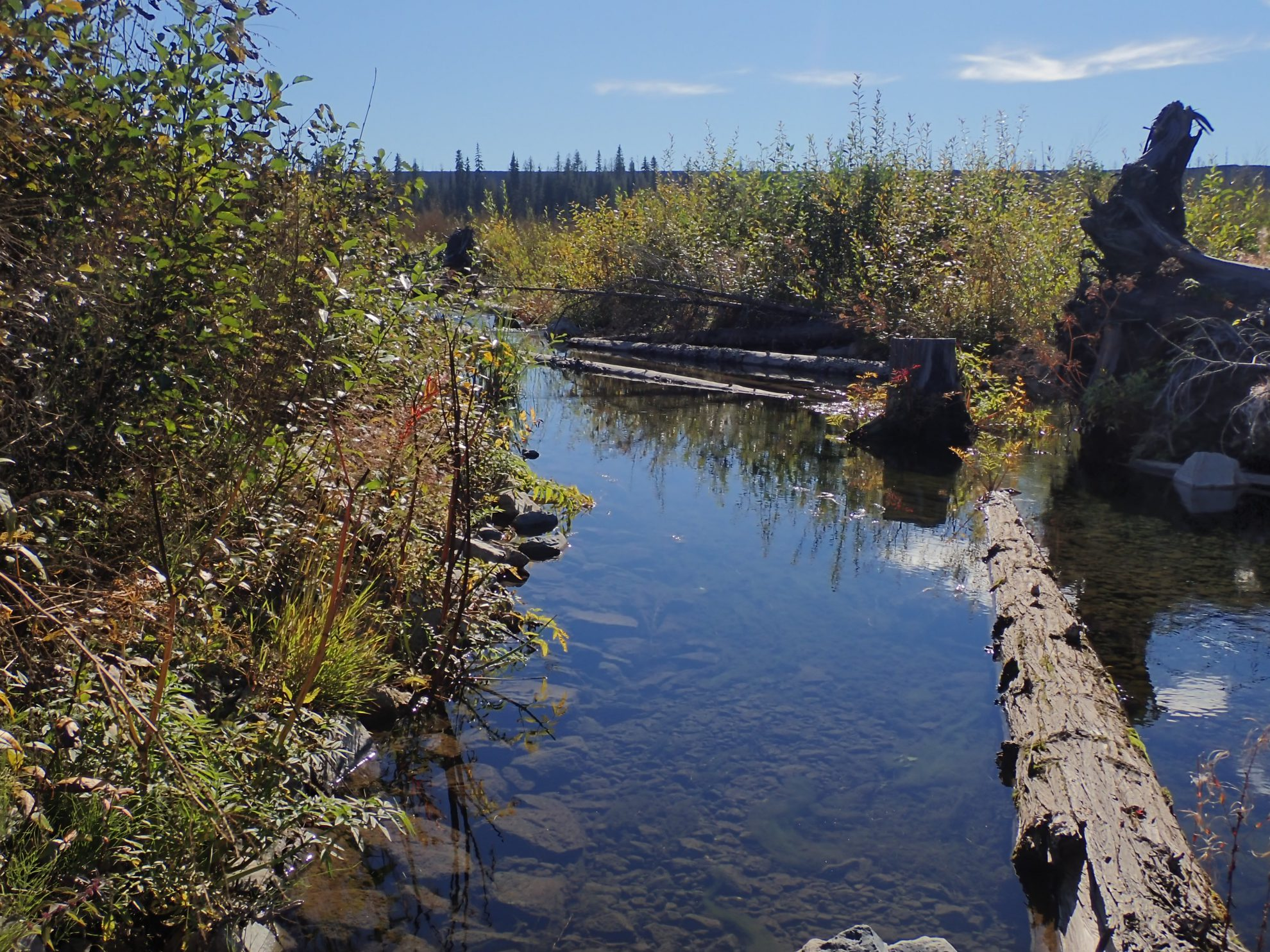
Riparian revegetation work at the Mount Polley mine in British Columbia, Canada

Revegetation is the process of replanting and rebuilding the soil of disturbed land. This may be a natural process produced by plant colonization and succession, manmade rewilding projects, accelerated process designed to repair damage to a landscape due to wildfire, mining, flood, or other cause. Originally the process was simply one of applying seed and fertilizer to disturbed lands, usually grasses or clover. The fibrous root network of grasses is useful for short-term erosion control, particularly on sloping ground. Establishing long-term plant communities requires forethought as to appropriate species for the climate, size of stock required, and impact of replanted vegetation on local fauna. The motivations behind revegetation are diverse, answering needs that are both technical and aesthetic, but it is usually erosion prevention that is the primary reason. Revegetation helps prevent soil erosion, enhances the ability of the soil to absorb more water in significant rain events, and in conjunction reduces turbidity dramatically in adjoining bodies of water. Revegetation also aids protection of engineered grades and other earthworks.

Organisations like Trees For Life (Brooklyn Park) provide good examples.

== For conservation ==
Revegetation is often used to join up patches of natural habitat that have been lost and can be a very important tool in places where much of the natural vegetation has been cleared. It is therefore particularly important in urban environments, and research in Brisbane has shown that revegetation projects can significantly improve urban bird populations. The Brisbane study showed that connecting a revegetation patch with existing habitat improved bird species richness, while simply concentrating on making large patches of habitat was the best way to increase bird abundance. Revegetation plans, therefore, need to consider how the revegetated sites are connected with existing habitat patches. Revegetation in agricultural areas can support breeding bird populations, but often it supports more common species, rather than those that are in decline.

== Spatial arrangement ==
The spatial arrangement of the selected plant species influences the vegetation system and the greater habitat system. Spatial planning determines interactions between plant species. These interactions can be facilitative or competitive. Planting certain species together can protect one or both from extreme temperature fluctuations, drying out in the sun, harsh winds, and predators, in addition to improving soil composition. Competition can occur within or between species, and generally weaker individuals and weaker species die out, resulting in increased plant spacing. Spatial arrangement of revegetation species also influences pollination and seed dispersal. For species whose seeds are wind-dispersed and animal-dispersed, plant diversity in seed dispersal range is important for genetic fitness. However, too much competition within the seed dispersal range can cause reproduction to be suppressed, so it is important to balance.

On the ecosystem level, the spatial planning of revegetation species influences animal species. A more varied plant species composition is more likely to be used by a wider variety of animal species. High-density edible plants mean animals do not have to forage as far to eat, and a plant species even being in the presence of palatable species could lead to it having more interaction with animals. Abiotic aspects of the ecosystem are also altered. Higher density revegetation can reduce erosion, protect against extreme temperatures, decrease evaporative losses of water, and increase water filtration and reinfiltration. However, higher density revegetation requires the use of more soil nutrients and water, which can potentially dry out and deplete the soil. For riparian revegetation, plant roots help to increase the shear strength of bank soil, and if tree roots begin to lose their strength, the bank is susceptible to land slips. Fibrous or matted roots in particular help to prevent against soil erosion, and are typically found in reed and sedge species.

== Soil replacement ==
Mine reclamation may involve soil amendment, replacement, or creation, particularly for areas that have been strip mined or suffered severe erosion or soil compaction. In some cases, the native soil may be removed before construction and replaced with fill for the duration of the work. After construction is completed, the fill is again removed and replaced with the reserved native soil for revegetation.

== Mycorrhizal communities ==
Mycorrhizae, symbiotic fungal-plant communities, are important to the success of revegetation efforts. Most woody plant species need these root-fungi communities to thrive, and nursery or greenhouse transplants may not have sufficient or correct mycorrhizae for good survival. Mycorhizal communities are particularly beneficial to nitrogen-fixing woody plants, C4-grasses, and soil environments low in phosphorus. Two types of mycorrhizal fungi aid in restoration: ectomycorrhizal fungi and arbuscular mycorrhizal fungi.

== See also ==
- Rewilding (conservation biology)
- The Lorax
- Tubestock
- Restoration Ecology
- Land Rehabilitation
- Mine Reclamation
- Agri-environmental measures
