= Thomas Buxton (New Zealand politician) =

New Zealand politician

The Honourable Thomas Buxton
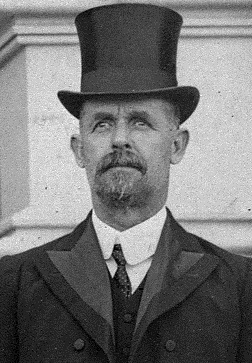

Minister without Portfolio
- In office 28 March 1912 – 10 July 1912
- Prime Minister: Thomas Mackenzie

Member of the New Zealand Parliament for Temuka
- In office 7 December 1911 – 10 December 1914
- Preceded by: New electorate
- Succeeded by: Charles John Talbot

Member of the New Zealand Parliament for Geraldine
- In office 2 December 1908 – 7 December 1911
- Preceded by: Frederick Flatman
- Succeeded by: Electorate abolished

Personal details
- Born: 1863 Lincolnshire, England
- Died: 28 May 1939 (aged 75–76) Christchurch, New Zealand
- Party: Liberal
- Relatives: Searby Buxton (father)

Thomas Buxton (1863–28 May 1939) was a Liberal Party Member of Parliament.

== Biography ==
=== Early life and career ===
He was born in Lincolnshire, England, in 1863 and came to New Zealand with his family in 1865. He was the son of New Zealand politician Searby Buxton.

When young he gained employment at the Farmers' Co-operative Association at Timaru remaining there until he commenced business on his own account 18 years later. He became a grain and produce merchant, first in Temuka and later in Timaru.

He was the chairman of the Temuka sports association and actively played tennis, cricket and golf.

=== Political career ===
New Zealand Parliament
| Years | Term | Electorate | Party |
|---|---|---|---|
| 1908–1911 | 17th | Geraldine | Liberal |
| 1911–1914 | 18th | Temuka | Liberal |

He was one of the inaugural members of the Temuka Borough Council and was the Mayor of Temuka for 10 years.

He represented the Geraldine electorate from 1908 to 1911; and then the Temuka electorate from 1911 to 1914, when he retired. He was a member of the Executive Council (without portfolio) in 1912 in the Liberal Government.

After leaving Parliament Buxton remained politically active and was for many years a local organiser for the Liberal Party, and later he was the national organiser for its successor the United Party.

=== Later life and death ===
He later became an organiser of the Farmers' Union. Buxton moved to Christchurch in 1921, where he spent the remainder of his life. He died there on 28 May 1939.

== Notes ==
New Zealand Parliament
| Preceded by Frederick Flatman | Member of Parliament for Geraldine; 1908–1911 | Constituency abolished |
| New constituency | Member of Parliament for Temuka; 1911–1914 | Succeeded by Charles John Talbot |
