= Joan and Eileen Bradley =

Bush regenerators (1916–1982)

- Eileen and Joan Bradley - environmentalists
- Born: Joan Burton Bradley and Eileen Burton Bradley; Neutral Bay
- Occupations: chemist and environmentalist
- Employer: National Trust of Australia
- Known for: Bush regeneration

Joan Burton Bradley (2 September 1916 – 18 May 1982) and her sister Eileen Burton Bradley (14 August 1911 – 1976) were Australian bush regenerators. They created a successful method of controlling invasive plants.

== Life ==
Eileen Bradley was born in Neutral Bay in 1911, and her sister Joan was born five years later in 1916. Their parents were Caroline Mary (born Drummond) and John Houghton Bradley. The two sisters were very close. Joan attended the University of Sydney and afterwards worked as an industrial chemist. Eileen was based at home but she did work at a dentists. Their father was a dentist and the rest of the family were amateur gardeners. In time the two sisters aided by their mother created a decorating business.

In 1958 the sisters published "Notes on the Behaviour and Plumage of Colour-ringed Blue Wrens" in the peer-reviewed journal Emu, which described their work trapping and ringing 25 superb fairywrens from three different groups, which they found in their garden and the nearby Ashton Park. Six years later they went to the press when they noticed that the population had been decimated. Joan was a trained chemist and they pointed out that organochlorine insecticides caused sterility in birds.

The sisters are known for their ideas for encouraging native plants to grow. They had seen that when weeds were cut back, they not only returned but they were stronger and more vigorous. However, their random acts of removing plants they did not like seemed to be successful. They experimented with weeding using only hand tools and found that removing weeds by hand was much more successful. Importantly, they would retain the mulch, after they had worked, to make sure that seeds were not mistakenly removed. They worked for only an hour a day attacking a less-infested area and only proceeding to more-infested areas as they witnessed regrowth after their work. They saw that native plants needed time to take over land so they had to be careful to be gentle and to not proceed too quickly. An area of high infestation should only be tackled when all the nearby areas were cleared. Eileen Bradley published Weeds and Their Control, Ashton Park, Mosman, N.S.W. in 1967 and in 1971 Joan published Bush Regeneration.

Joan was employed by the National Trust of Australia in 1975 as they experimented with the Bradley method of controlling weeds at the Ludovic Blackwood Memorial Sanctuary in Beecroft.

Joan died in Clifton Gardens in 1982, six years after Eileen. Both had died of myocardial infarction.
