= Dilohana Lekamge =

Sri Lankan/NZ artist, writer and curator

- Born: 1994
- Known for: Moving image and performance art, art curation
- Notable work: A Different Ocean

Dilohana Lekamge is a Sri Lankan-New Zealand artist, writer and curator. Her work uses performance and video to explore Sri Lankan diaspora and migration experiences.

Lekamge was a facilitator for MEANWHILE, an artist-run exhibition space, venue and studio in Wellington, from 2017 to 2019. She is an archivist for Satellites, a digital archive and online publisher for Aotearoa-based Asian artists.

== Art practice ==
Lekamge works in performance and moving image media.

In 2021 she was awarded the RM Women's Moving Image Grant, with which she produced the work A Different Ocean.

A Different Ocean was included alongside a new commissioned film work, A softer limestone, in Like water by water (2023) at Aigantighe Art Gallery, in Timaru. Both works focus on Ram Setu and geological elements of place.

== Writing ==
As a writer Lekamge has been published widely across New Zealand art channels, including work in Art New Zealand, Gus Fisher Gallery's website, and Christchurch Art Gallery's Bulletin.

== Curatorial work ==
Lekamge's curatorial lens interrogates the boundaries of national identity in New Zealand art history to find those whose contributions have continued to be marginalised, as in 2022's The house is full at Te Tuhi.

Lekamge was Associate Curator at The Performance Arcade in 2021, and became Exhibition Curator and Gallery Manager for Depot, an art space and creative hub in Devonport, in 2023.
