= Charles John Talbot =

Member of Parliament in New Zealand

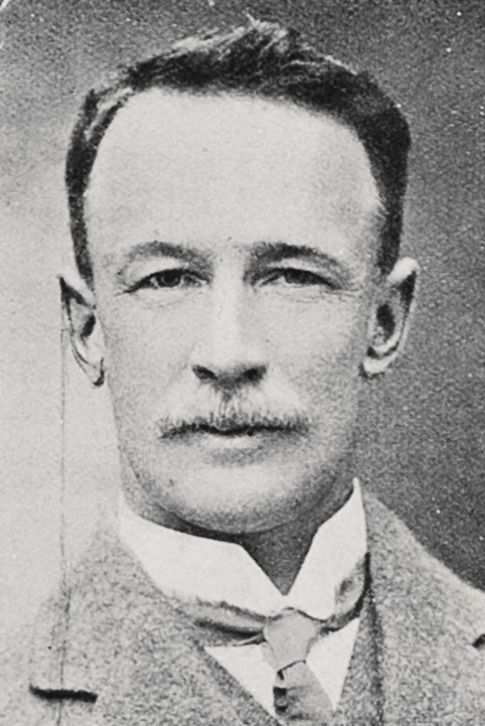
Charles Talbot

New Zealand Parliament
Years	Term	Electorate	Party
1914–1919	19th	Temuka	Liberal

Charles John Talbot (1873–1942) was a Liberal Party Member of Parliament in New Zealand.

He won the Temuka electorate in south Canterbury in the 1914 general election, and held it until 1919, when he was defeated by Thomas Burnett.

New Zealand Parliament
Preceded by Thomas Buxton	Member of Parliament for Temuka; 1914–1919	Succeeded by Thomas Burnett
