= Henry John Yeend King =

English painter

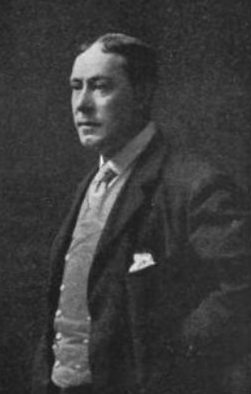
- Born: 21 August 1855; London, England
- Died: 10 June 1924 (aged 68); London, England
- Known for: Genre painting

Henry John Yeend King (21 August 1855 – 10 June 1924) was an English painter. He is known for his paintings of pastoral genre scenes.

== Biography ==
Yeend King was born in London in 1855. He would first work for three years in a glassworks on Berners Street in Marylebone. He would begin his artistic training under William Bromley before moving to Paris to study under Léon Bonnat and Fernand Cormon who were at the time professors at the École des Beaux-Arts.

Yeend King would exhibit both in London, at the Royal Academy from 1879, and throughout Europe including in Munich and Berlin. He would also receive a bronze medal at the 1889 Exposition Universelle in Paris. He was a member of the Royal Society of British Artists and would serve as vice-president of the Royal Institute of Painters in Watercolours.
