= St. David's Memorial Church, Cave =

Church in Cave, New Zealand

St. David's Memorial Church
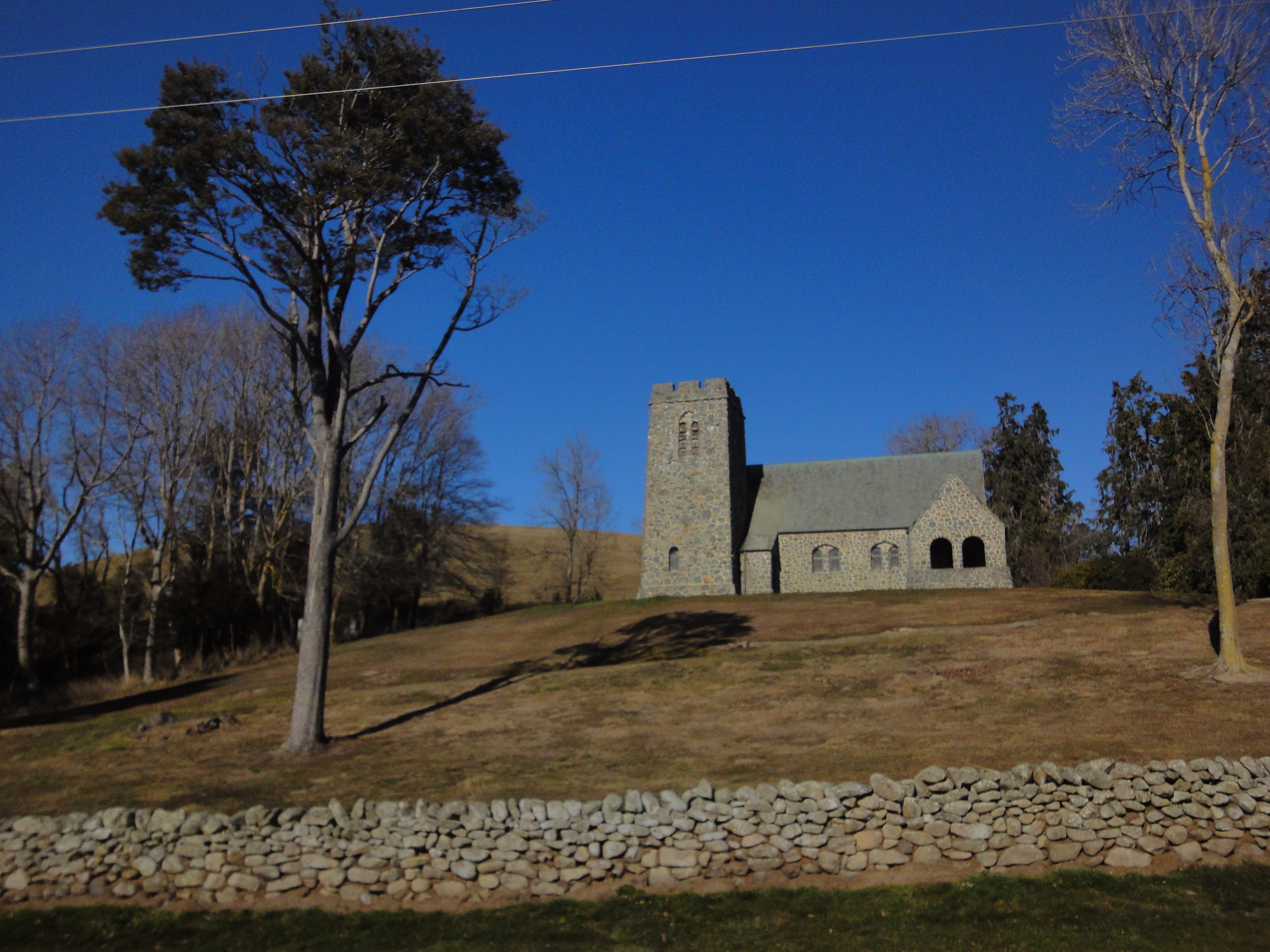
- Interactive map of the St. David's Memorial Church area

General information
- Architectural style: Norman revival
- Location: Cave, New Zealand
- Coordinates: 44.318175°S 170.939222°E
- Completed: 1930

Design and construction
- Architect: Herbert W. Hall
- Awards: NZIA Gold Medal 1934

Heritage New Zealand – Category 1
- Designated: 28 June 1984
- Reference no.: 312

St. David's Memorial Church is a historic building in the township of Cave, New Zealand. One of two memorial churches in South Canterbury recognising the runholders and shepherds of the Mackenzie country, it is registered with Heritage New Zealand as a Historic Place Category 1 building.

== History ==
St. David's Memorial Church was designed in 1930 by Herbert W. Hall. The building was awarded the New Zealand Institute of Architects gold medal in 1934. It was built for Thomas Burnett in memory of his father Andrew Burnett (1838–1927) and his mother Catherine (1837–1914), as well as to commemorate other pioneering run-holders who took up runs in the Mackenzie country. A memorial chair to the early ministers in the Mackenzie Country, made of black pine, was installed in 1935.

Built from glacial stones that had been minimally worked for a rugged, randomised appearance, St. David's Memorial Church has similarity to the Norman style of churches. It has a nave, to which an entry porch is provided, and a tower with a crenelated parapet. Westmoreland slate was used for the roof.

The National Historic Places Trust, the predecessor to Heritage New Zealand, listed the church as a Historic Place Category 1 on 28 June 1984, with a list number of 312.
