= Agri-environmental measures =

Agricultural policies in the EU

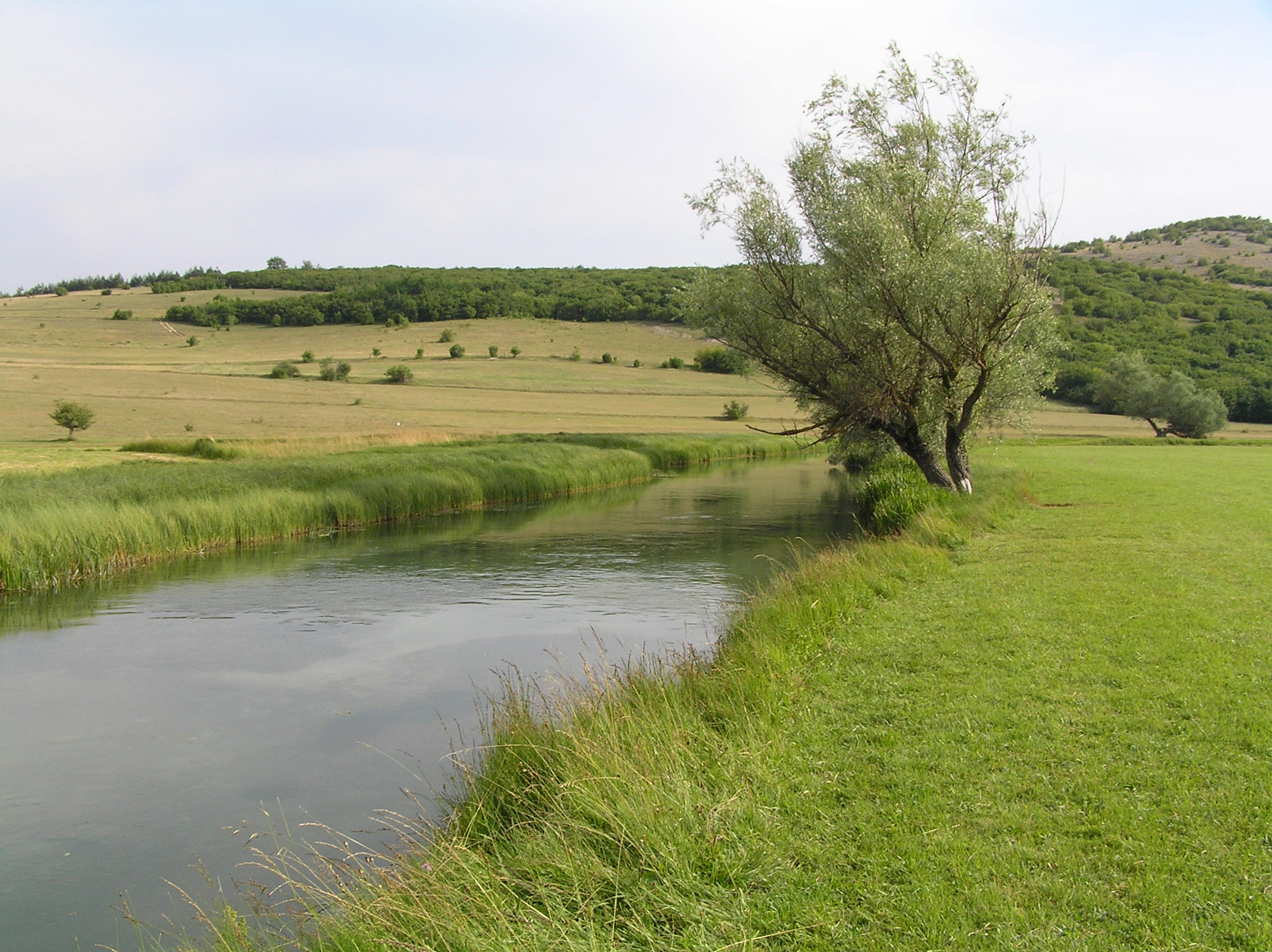
Grass strips act as erosion control devices and flood expansion zones. They limit the input of pesticides and fertilizers to watercourses. Extensively grazed and/or mowed, they play a major role in bank protection and biological corridors, provided they are not polluted or too isolated from other natural landscape features.

Agri-environmental measures (MAE) are measures introduced in the European Union as part of the Common Agricultural Policy, in return for payments to voluntary farmers. They are one response to the growing concerns of the public, consumers, local authorities and certain elected representatives about the ecological impact of the intensification of agriculture, which developed strongly throughout the 20th century, relying on crop mechanization, chemical inputs, off-farm breeding and, more recently, biotechnologies integrating the transfer of genes from one species to another (transgenesis).

== Objectives ==
These measures are mainly aimed at protecting rural landscapes, watercourses, flora, and fauna.

These credits are generally for maintenance (management), not investment ( they finance hedge management, not hedge planting). They are governed by the European "agri-environmental" regulation of June 30, 1992, which resulted from the reform of the Common Agricultural Policy (CAP) in May 1992. Each member state has developed its subsidiary version.

In France, the 2007-2013 programming period classifies MAEs into nine schemes:

1. the Prime Herbagère Agroenvironnementale or PHAE
2. the rotational MAE
3. aid for input-saving polyculture-breeding forage systems (SFEI)
4. aid for conversion to organic farming (CAB)
5. support for maintaining organic farming (MAB)
6. protection of endangered breeds (PRM)
7. Preservation of endangered plant resources (PRV)
8. aid for beekeeping
9. MAE territorialized (MAET)

In the case of MAET, only certain types of measures are eligible, and only on certain territories; for example, in Natura 2000 areas, in regional nature parks, in areas vulnerable to erosion, etc. (they are said to be territorialized). These measures can be financed by the State via the DIREN, or by the Water Agencies (protection of water catchment areas, etc.), but also by local authorities (regional councils, general councils, etc.). They are co-financed up to 55% by the European Agricultural Fund for Rural Development (EAFRD).

== Examples of agri-environmental measures (MAE) ==
- grassed strips along watercourses
- agri-environmental grassland premium (PHAE)
- fertilizer ban on certain natural grasslands.
- maintenance of rangelands
- restoration and maintenance of hedges and hedgerows
- agroforestry
- Limitation of phytosanitary treatments
- conversion to organic farming
- Topographical equivalent surface (SET)

== MAET and biodiversity ==
From 2011 to 2013, the following are eligible as "biodiversity areas (BA)":

- Permanent grassland, moorland, rangeland, alpine pastures, estates located in Natura 2000 zones; 1 ha of grassland in Natura 2000 = 2 ha of SB, and 1 ha of SB = 0.5 ha of grassland in Natura 2000;
- Perennial grassed buffer strips located outside watercourses, established as part of GAEC; 1 ha of buffer strips = 1 ha of SB and 1 ha of SB = 1 ha of buffer strips;
- Fixed fallow (excluding industrial set-aside); in strips 10 to 20 m wide 1 ha fallow = 1 ha SB 1 ha SB = 1 ha fallow;
- Herbaceous areas set aside and withdrawn from production; 1 m length = 100 m2 of SB 1 ha of SB = 100 m length set aside;
- High-stem orchards; 1 ha of high-stem orchards = 5 ha of SB and 1 ha of SB = 0.2 ha of high-stem orchards;
- Peat bogs; 1 ha of peat bogs = 20 ha of SB and 1 ha of SB = 5 ares of peat bogs Hedges 1 linear meter = 100 m^{2} of SB 1 ha of SB = 100 m of hedges;
- Tree lines; 1 linear meter = 10 m^{2} of SB and 1 ha of SB = 1 km of tree lines;
- Isolated trees; 1 tree = 50 m^{2} of SB and 1 ha of SB = 200 isolated trees;
- Forest edges, copses; 1 meter of edge = 100 m^{2} of SB and 1 ha of SB = 100 m of forest edge;
- Ditches, watercourses, gullies; 1 linear meter = 10 m^{2} of SB and 1 ha of SB = 1 km of ditches;
- Ponds, potholes; 1 meter of perimeter = 100 m^{2} of SB and 1 ha of SB = 100 m of perimeter;
- Low walls, terraces with low walls, clapas; 1 meter of low walls = 50 m^{2} of SB and 1 ha of SB = 200 m of low walls;
- Certain types of moorland, grazing land, mountain pastures, estivates (defined at the departmental level by the prefect);
- Certain permanent grasslands defined at the departmental level (wet meadows, coastal meadows, etc.);

The Prefect, by prefectural decree, may add to this list certain types of permanent grassland or extensive grazing areas of particular interest for the protection of biodiversity (wet meadows or coastal meadows, for example).

== Assessments, evaluations ==
Despite Natura 2000 programs and over 20 years of agri-environmental subsidies, across the northern hemisphere as a whole, most agricultural biodiversity indicators show worrying problems, including in most areas where agri-environmental measures have been applied since the 1990s. This is also true of France, where we are witnessing a trivialization of flora and fauna, with a sharp reduction in biodiversity. These measures have slowed the phenomenon, but not stopped it. Research on agricultural biodiversity and finance peaked between 2000 and 2003, with limited subsequent integration into newer work on corporate sustainability reporting or conservation finance instruments.

Qualitative and financial assessments are difficult to establish for several reasons:

- systems that compensate farmers financially for the loss of income associated with measures deemed beneficial to the environment or biodiversity vary from country to country and from period to period; thus, in some cases, the main objectives are a sharp reduction in emissions of chemical or non-chemical inputs (chemical fertilizers or nutrients brought in excess in other forms); pesticides. These objectives do not seem to have been achieved in 2013 in France, for example, where nitrates and pesticides continue to pose serious eutrophication and ecotoxicological problems.) Other objectives include protecting biodiversity and its habitats, through renaturation (restoration of ponds, hedges, reintroduction of species, etc.), rural landscapes, and preventing rural exodus;
- a geographical area may be affected by pesticide inputs (mainly airborne or runoff) or by turbidity phenomena induced by agriculture outside the area concerned, or upstream of the watershed;
- program content, requirements, and indicators vary from country to country and region to region, and not all European countries benefit from agri-environmental programs (only 26 out of 44 European countries had such a program at the beginning of the 2000s; however, some of the countries not benefiting from such programs had more extensive agriculture, and a priori less destructive of biodiversity);
- logically, areas of extensive agriculture (where biodiversity is still relatively present) were more targeted by these programs, while areas of intensive agriculture (where biodiversity had already been greatly reduced, continued to deteriorate).

=== In the United States; a tradition going back more than 70 years ===
In the United States, agricultural subsidies (and even crop insurance) are much more subject to cross-compliance than in Europe. This environmental conditionality has been an integral part of American agricultural policy since the 1930s, following the observation of severe soil degradation caused by the intensification of agriculture.

In 1985, the United States introduced three separate cross-compliance programs for field crops (corn, wheat, barley, sorghum, oats, rice, cotton, and soybeans, which receive aid via commodity programs). These three programs were set up under the 1985 Farm Bill. They are overseen by the Farm Service Agency (FSA) and the Natural Resources Conservation Service (NRCS).

1. conservation compliance", aimed primarily at combating soil erosion and degradation (with 41 million hectares eligible);
2. sodbuster", designed to protect vulnerable soils from plowing and cultivation;
3. the "swam-buster", targeting wetlands (6 million hectares)

In 2013, "about 80% of U.S. farmers use crop insurance as an essential risk management tool to manage price volatility and climate variability; Farmers and ranchers pay a premium for this insurance, but about 60 percent of the actual cost of this premium is covered by taxpayers via USDA subsidies". Thus, the public may legitimately want crop insurance payments to be conditional on environmentally sound agricultural performance, argues Bruce Knight, Director of Strategic Conservation Solutions and former Secretary of Marketing and Regulatory Programs at the United States Department of Agriculture (USDA) from 2006 to 2009, after having headed the Natural Resources Conservation Service (from 2002 to 2006).

=== In Europe: mixed results ===
In Europe, eco-conditionality has been enshrined in the horizontal regulations of the "Berlin Agreement" since 1999. However, for reasons of subsidiarity, it is the member states of the European Union who define the precise content of the programs, and who must ensure, through appropriate controls, that they are properly applied on their territory.

In 2003, a study estimated that around 24.3 billion euros had been spent on agri-environmental programs in the European Union (EU) between 1994 and 2002, but it was not possible to assess how much of this was spent on biodiversity; an exhaustive search of studies that had sought to test the effectiveness of agri-environmental programs in the press showed that only 62 evaluation studies had been published, carried out in just 5 EU countries and Switzerland; 76% of the studies were carried out in the Netherlands and the UK, where at that time only 6% of the EU's agri-environmental budgets had been spent. A few studies concerned Germany Ireland and Portugal; and 31% of these studies contained no statistical analysis. What's more, when an experimental approach was used, its conclusions were generally weak and biased towards the most favorable indicators. The most common experimental design (used by 37% of studies) was to compare biodiversity in agri-environmental scheme areas and areas presented as control areas, but with biases, for example when farmers or coordinating authorities selected the agri-environmental scheme sites studied. In such cases, the sites were likely to have higher biodiversity at the outset than the control sites; this problem can be solved by collecting a wider range of baseline data (34% of studies), comparing trends and not just inventories or inventories (32%) or studying changes (26% of cases) in biodiversity depending on whether or not the area benefits from agri-environmental measures, or better (done in only 16% of studies) by matching control sites and those that have benefited from agri-environmental measures so that their environmental conditions are similar.

- only just over half (54%) of the indicator species or groups studied showed an increase. And 6% of these indicators showed a decrease in species richness (fewer species) or abundance compared to the control sites.
- At 17% of sites, some species seemed to benefit from the measures, while 23% showed no change at all, with a highly variable response depending on the taxa observed.
- Of 19 studies that examined bird response and included statistical analysis, only 4 concluded that there was a significant increase in bird richness or abundance. Two studies even showed a decrease, while 9 others showed both increases and decreases.
- About arthropods, comparisons with control sites were made by 20 studies; only 11 studies showed an increase in species richness or abundance, but none showed a decrease, and three showed both increases and decreases depending on the taxon.
- Concerning effects on plant biodiversity: 14 studies were carried out, of which less than half (six) showed an increase in species richness or flora abundance. Two showed decreases, and no study showed a combination of increases and decreases. the review of the literature published in 2003 for Europe concluded that none of the evaluation studies published up to that point could be considered robust or allow a general judgment to be made on the effectiveness of European agri-environmental programs. The authors called for a process of ecological effects assessment to be incorporated as an integral part of any agri-environmental scheme, including systematic collection of baseline data, more random positioning of control sites, but in areas benefiting from the measures, and ensuring that they are scientifically comparable (which implies similar initial conditions) with sufficient replication of measures and controls. They also feel that the results of these studies should be more widely collected and disseminated, to better identify and disseminate best practices in biodiversity enhancement and protection, and to spend the subsidies and grants earmarked for these measures more efficiently.

In 2019, an econometric study carried out in Lorraine also attempted to measure the impact of this policy on land use, which conditions the production of ecosystem services, from 1988 to 2015, based on data collected from the Fadn and Annual Agricultural Statistics (Dussine, 2019). It appears that direct subsidies paid to encourage certain activities have a relatively limited impact on land use, while agri-environmental measures could explain the development of certain surfaces such as protein crops which, when coupled with oilseeds (such as the rapeseed/beans combination), make it possible to limit insecticide treatments. Similarly, compensatory allowances paid for natural handicaps (Ichn) seem to have a very positive impact on grassland, wasteland, and deciduous trees and even seem to be able to slow down the artificialization of land, but the amounts involved are small and many farmers consider them insufficient.

=== Under the new CAP ===
A few new features have appeared locally and briefly, including the possibility (in 2010 only) of MAE Rotationnelle (MAER), a 5-year contract for farms producing 60% or more of cereals and oilseeds in the 2010 UAA. In return, they must diversify their annual crop rotation and introduce a crop succession (on the plots involved) that better preserves or restores biodiversity, while limiting inputs.

From 2003 onwards, the new CAP must theoretically accompany its subsidies with clearer environmental requirements and result indicators. Second pillar aids" are "voluntary contractual aids, in the form of the Indemnité Compensatoire des Handicaps Naturels (ICHN), or return for compliance with environmental specifications over five years (Mesures Agroenvironnementales, including the Prime Herbagère Agroenvironnementale and the MAE Rotationnelle...) "; new MAEs are theoretically limited to MAE Territorialisées (in Natura 2000 zones, and especially catchment areas). A new aid reform is scheduled for 2014 (in particular to accompany the end of milk quotas scheduled for 2015). Farmers must declare on the RPG (Registre parcellaire graphique) the outline of the "parcelles culturales" that are the subject of a commitment (MAE, PHAE, Bio, etc.), and enter the code of each crop, committed or not, present within the PAC islet, which should also help improve environmental assessment statistics. GAECs are subject to a special procedure concerning the "maximum surface area that can be committed to a new MAE contract (PHAE2, MAE Rotationnelle), with a limit of 3 farms within the GAEC ".

== See also ==
- Revegetation
- Ecological engineering
- Sustainable agriculture
- Natura 2000
- Agroforestry

== Bibliography ==
- "Des projets agro-environnementaux innovants, intégrés et collectifs: quelques enseignements tirés de l'analyse d'expériences de terrainCentre d'études et de prospective du ministère de l'Agriculture, de l'Agroalimentaire et de la Forêt". Centre d'études et de prospective du ministère de l'Agriculture, de l'Agroalimentaire et de la Forêt. 2015.
- "Productions végétales, pratiques agricoles et faune sauvage, Acta, réalisé avec l'IUPP". ONCFS. 2007. ISBN 978-2-85794-239-9.
- D, Kleijn; W.J, Sutherland (2003). "How effective are European agri-environment schemes in conserving and promoting biodiversity?". Journal of Applied Ecology. 40 (6): 947–969. Bibcode:2003JApEc..40..947K. doi:10.1111/j.1365-2664.2003.00868.x.
- L, Dobremez; F, Véron (1997). "à l'évaluation des mesures agri-environnementales: exemples de démarches". Ingénieries-EAT.
- Premier bilan des mesures agroenvironnementales européennes. 1993.
