= Temuka (electorate) =

Temuka was a parliamentary electorate in the Canterbury region of New Zealand from 1911 to 1946. The electorate was represented by four Members of Parliament.

== Population centres ==
In the 1911 electoral redistribution, the North Island gained a further seat from the South Island due to faster population growth. In addition, there were substantial population movements within each island, and significant changes resulted from this. Only four electorates were unaltered, five electorates were abolished, one former electorate was re-established, and four electorates, including Temuka, were created for the first time.

Through the 1911 electoral redistribution, the Geraldine electorate was abolished, and its area split between the new Temuka electorate and an enlarged Ashburton electorate. Initially, the Temuka electorate included the settlements of Temuka, Pleasant Point, Fairlie, Lake Tekapo, Mount Cook, and Twizel.

In the 1918 electoral redistribution, the Temuka electorate moved north and gained the town of Geraldine. In the 1922 electoral redistribution, the Temuka electorate moved slightly south with losing or gaining significant settlements.

In the 1927 electoral redistribution, the Temuka electorate moved significantly to the north, and Fairlie, Lake Tekapo, Twizel, and Mount Cook were lost, and Mount Somers was gained. Boundary changes through the 1937 electoral redistribution were minimal, with some area near the town of Temuka gained from the Timaru electorate. In the 1946 electoral redistribution, the Temuka electorate was abolished, with most of its area going to the Ashburton electorate, and the balance, including the town of Temuka, going to the Waimate electorate.

== History ==
The electorate was established for the 1911 election. The first representative was Thomas Buxton of the Liberal Party, who had previously represented Geraldine and who retired at the end of the term in 1914. Charles John Talbot won the 1914 election, but was defeated at the 1919 election by Thomas Burnett of the Reform Party. Burnett represented Temuka until his death in 1941.

Jack Acland succeeded Burnett in a 1942 by-election. The electorate was abolished in 1946, and Acland was defeated standing for the Timaru electorate.

=== Members of Parliament ===
The electorate was represented by four Members of Parliament.

Key

Liberal Reform National

Election	Winner
1911 election	Thomas Buxton
1914 election	Charles Talbot
1919 election	Thomas Burnett
1922 election	Thomas Burnett
1925 election	Thomas Burnett
1928 election	Thomas Burnett
1931 election	Thomas Burnett
1935 election	Thomas Burnett
1938 election	Thomas Burnett
1942 by-election	Jack Acland
1943 election	Jack Acland
(Abolished in 1946; see Ashburton and Waimate)

== Election results ==
=== 1942 by-election ===
1942 Temuka by-election
Party	Candidate	Votes	%	±%
National	Jack Acland	4,142	73.20	
Independent	Donald Cyrus Davie	1,516	26.80	
Majority		2,626	46.40	
Turnout		5,658		

=== 1938 election ===
1938 general election: Temuka
Party	Candidate	Votes	%	±%
National	Thomas Burnett	5,494	56.41	+5.84
Labour	James Arnold Kearton	4,245	43.59	
Majority		1,249	12.82	+6.32
Informal votes		28	0.29	
Turnout		9,767	96.31	+4.27
Registered electors		10,141		

=== 1935 election ===
1935 general election: Temuka
Party	Candidate	Votes	%	±%
Reform	Thomas Burnett	4,701	50.57	−6.94
Labour	Bert Langford	4,096	44.06	+1.57
Democrat	James Cartwright	499	5.37	
Majority		605	6.51	−8.51
Turnout		9,296	92.04	+4.00
Registered electors		10,100		

=== 1931 election ===
1931 general election: Temuka
Party	Candidate	Votes	%	±%
Reform	Thomas Burnett	4,737	57.51	+7.01
United	Bert Langford	3,500	42.49	−7.01
Majority		1,237	15.02	+14.02
Informal votes		18	0.22	−0.15
Turnout		8,255	88.04	−2.53
Registered electors		9,376		

=== 1928 election ===
1928 general election: Temuka
Party	Candidate	Votes	%	±%
Reform	Thomas Burnett	4,360	50.50	−3.20
United	Bert Langford	4,274	49.50	
Majority		86	1.00	−6.40
Informal votes		32	0.37	−0.15
Turnout		8,666	90.57	−3.11
Registered electors		9,568		

=== 1925 election ===
1925 general election: Temuka
Party	Candidate	Votes	%	±%
Reform	Thomas Burnett	3,883	53.70	+1.00
Liberal	Charles John Talbot	3,348	46.30	
Majority		535	7.40	+1.61
Informal votes		38	0.52	+0.06
Turnout		7,269	93.68	+3.27
Registered electors		7,759		

=== 1922 election ===
1922 general election: Temuka
Party	Candidate	Votes	%	±%
Reform	Thomas Burnett	3,705	52.70	+2.46
Liberal	Bert Langford (Note: Many sources refer to Langford as "Liberal-Labour")	3,298	46.91	
Independent	Philip Richard Needham	28	0.40	
Majority		407	5.79	+5.32
Informal votes		33	0.47	−0.33
Turnout		7,064	90.41	+9.23
Registered electors		7,813		

Table footnotes:

=== 1919 election ===
1919 general election: Temuka
Party	Candidate	Votes	%	±%
Reform	Thomas Burnett	3,294	50.24	
Liberal	Charles Talbot	3,263	49.76	
Majority		31	0.47	
Informal votes		53	0.80	
Turnout		6,610	81.18	
Registered electors		8,142		
