= International Tree Foundation =

International conservation organisation

- Predecessor: Watu wa Mitu (People of the Trees)
- Formation: 1922 (as Men of the Trees)
- Registration no.: 05219549
- Location: Oxford, United Kingdom
- Region served: Africa, United Kingdom
- Website: internationaltreefoundation.org
- Formerly called: Men of the Trees

International Tree Foundation (ITF) is an international, non-profit, non-political, conservation organisation. It is involved in planting, maintenance and protection of trees. It was founded in Kenya on 22 July 1922 by Richard St. Barbe Baker as Men of the Trees.

ITF operates in several countries in Africa and in the United Kingdom. There have been chapters in over 100 countries. By some estimates, organizations he founded or assisted have been responsible for planting at least 26 billion trees, internationally.

== History ==
ITF was founded in 1924 by Richard St. Barbe Baker. Following his work in Kenya creating Watu wa Mitu (People of the Trees) with Chief Josiah Njonjo, he returned to the United Kingdom with the goal of raising awareness about the benefits of reforestation around the world by creating the charity Men of the Trees. In 1929, a branch was opened in Palestine.

== Renaming ==
In 1992, Men of the Trees was renamed to the International Tree Foundation, and has continued to work around the world in local communities on a variety of projects centred around reforestation, environmental protection and community-building.

In Australia there is currently still a small organization that goes by the name Men of the Trees, although in England, where the charity originated, the original charity has now been fully rebranded as the International Tree Foundation.

== See also ==
- Ancient Forest Alliance
- Global Forest Coalition
