= Cave, New Zealand =

Cave
- town
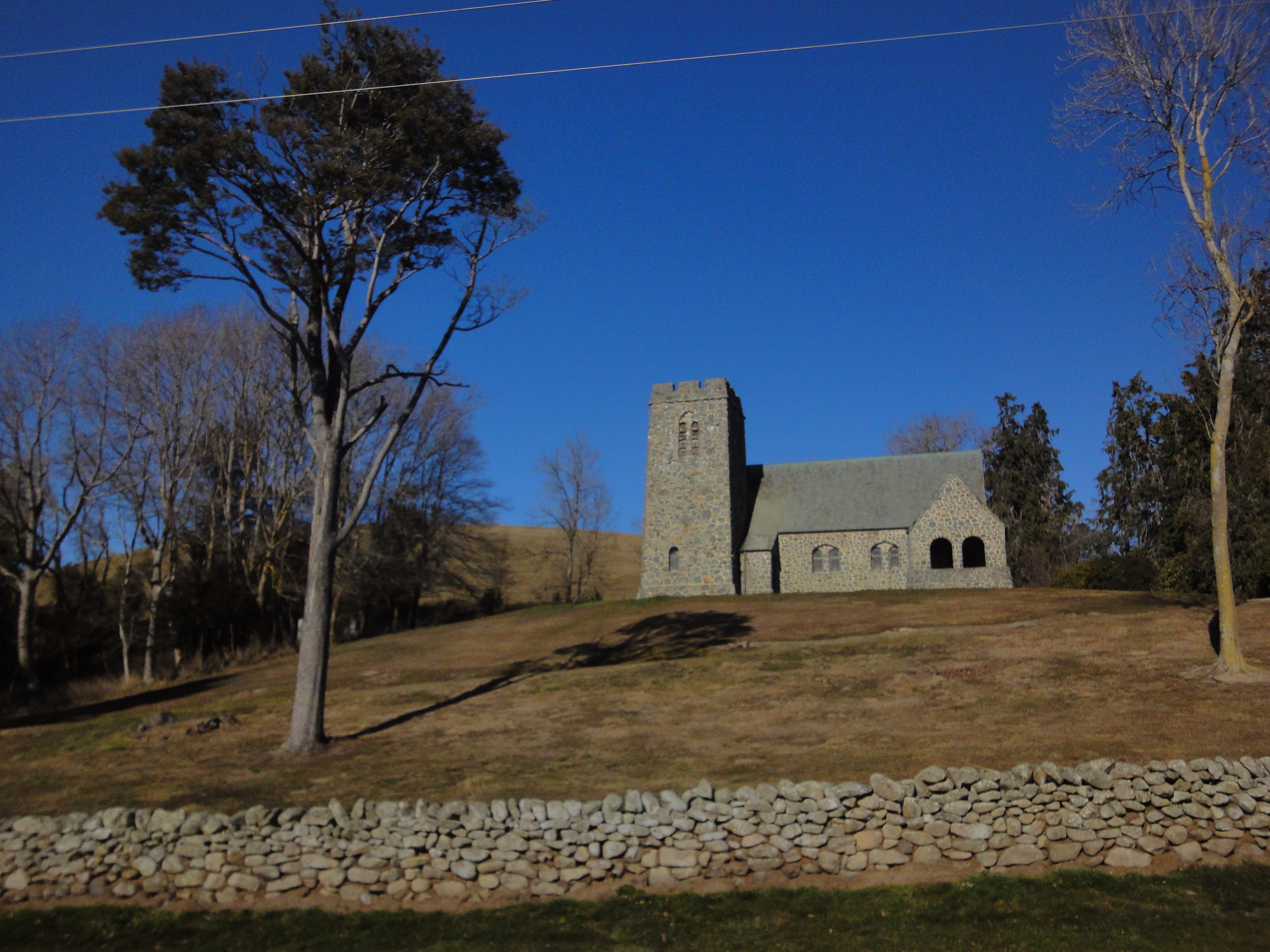
- St. David's Memorial Church
- Interactive map of Cave
- Coordinates: 44°19′S 170°57′E
- Country: New Zealand
- Region: Canterbury
- Territorial authority: Timaru District
- Ward: Pleasant Point-Temuka
- Community: Pleasant Point
- Electorates: Waitaki; Te Tai Tonga (Māori)

Government
  - Territorial authority: Timaru District Council
  - Regional council: Environment Canterbury
  - Mayor of Timaru: Nigel Bowen
  - Waitaki MP: Miles Anderson
  - Te Tai Tonga MP: Tākuta Ferris

Area
  - Total: 1.24 km^{2} (0.48 sq mi)

Population (June 2025)
  - Total: 100
  - Density: 81/km^{2} (210/sq mi)
- Time zone: UTC+12 (New Zealand Standard Time)
  - Summer (DST): UTC+13 (New Zealand Daylight Time)
- Postcode: 7930
- Local iwi: Ngāi Tahu
- Website: timaru.govt.nz

Cave is a town located in the Timaru District, South Island, New Zealand. It is approximately 23 kilometres (14 mi) north-west of Timaru on State Highway 8. St. David's Memorial Church was commissioned by Thomas Burnett and designed by Herbert W. Hall. Built in 1930, it is registered as a category I heritage building with Heritage New Zealand.

Although the name suggests otherwise, there are no caves for the public to explore in Cave. The town was named Cave after several limestone caves in the wider area.

== Demographics ==
Cave is described as a rural settlement by Statistics New Zealand, and covers 1.24 km^{2} (0.48 sq mi). It had an estimated population of 100 as of June 2025, with a population density of 81 people per km^{2}. The settlement is part of the larger Levels Valley statistical area.

Historical population
Year	Pop.	±% p.a.
2006	78	—
2013	81	+0.54%
2018	78	−0.75%
2023	96	+4.24%

Cave had a population of 96 in the 2023 New Zealand census, an increase of 18 people (23.1%) since the 2018 census, and an increase of 15 people (18.5%) since the 2013 census. There were 45 males and 54 females in 42 dwellings. The median age was 52.5 years (compared with 38.1 years nationally). There were 9 people (9.4%) aged under 15 years, 9 (9.4%) aged 15 to 29, 51 (53.1%) aged 30 to 64, and 27 (28.1%) aged 65 or older.

People could identify as more than one ethnicity. The results were 96.9% European (Pākehā), and 9.4% Māori. English was spoken by 100.0%, Māori by 3.1%, and other languages by 3.1%. The percentage of people born overseas was 18.8, compared with 28.8% nationally.

Religious affiliations were 25.0% Christian, and 3.1% Buddhist. People who answered that they had no religion were 56.2%, and 12.5% of people did not answer the census question.

Of those at least 15 years old, 3 (3.4%) people had a bachelor's or higher degree, 57 (65.5%) had a post-high school certificate or diploma, and 24 (27.6%) people exclusively held high school qualifications. The median income was $35,700, compared with $41,500 nationally. 6 people (6.9%) earned over $100,000 compared to 12.1% nationally. The employment status of those at least 15 was 42 (48.3%) full-time, 15 (17.2%) part-time, and 3 (3.4%) unemployed.
