= List of New Zealand women artists =

This is a list of women artists who were born in New Zealand or whose artworks are closely associated with that country.

== A ==
- Airini A'Court (born 1953), painter
- Zena Abbott (1922–1993), weaver
- Caroline Abraham (1809–1877), painter
- Emily Acland (1830–1905), pioneer settler and watercolour painter
- Avis Acres (1910–1994), painter, illustrator, writer
- Florence Akins (1906–2012), metalworker and textile artist
- Chrystabel Aitken (1904–2005), sculpture, jewellery, metalwork, linocuts
- Gretchen Albrecht (born 1943), painter, sculptor
- Edith Amituanai (born 1980), photographer
- Gladys Anderson (born 19th century), painter
- Hiria Anderson (born 1974), painter
- Rita Angus (1908–1970), painter
- Aina Apse (1926–2015), potter
- Esther Archdall (1916–1999), textile artist
- Mina Arndt (1885–1926), painter
- Tanya Ashken (born 1939), sculptor and jeweller
- Raewyn Atkinson (born 1955), ceramicist

== B ==
- Whero O Te Rangi Bailey (1935—2016), weaver and textile artist
- Gertrude Ball (1879–1971), wood engraver and painter
- Ria Bancroft (1907–1993), sculptor
- Nola Barron (born 1931), potter
- Pauline Bern (born 1952), jeweller
- Phyllis Bethune (1899–1982), landscape painter
- Vivien Bishop (born 1945), painter
- Lisa Black (born 1982), mixed media sculptor
- Margery Blackman (born 1930), weaver
- Eden Bleazard (1855–1946), painter
- Bessie Blomfield (1880–1984), painter
- Constance Bolton (1884–1949), painter
- Christine Boswijk (born 1939), ceramist
- Olivia Spencer Bower (1905–1982), painter
- Joanna Braithwaite (born 1962), painter
- Jane Brenkley (1882–1973), painter, wood carver and embroiderer
- Stella Brennan (born 1974), installation artist
- Freda Brierley (born 1942), textile artist
- Jude Broughan (born 1976), mixed media artist
- Cath Brown (1933–2004), weaver and ceramicist
- Helen Brown (1917–1986), painter
- Pelenakeke Brown, multi-disciplinary artist
- Kathleen Browne (1905–2007), painter
- Mary-Louise Browne (born 1957), text-based conceptual artist
- Annie Buckhurst (1894–1959), metalwork artist
- Jessie Buckland (1878–1939), photographer
- Emily Valentine Bullock (living), jeweller and creator of wearable art
- Maude Burge (1865–1957), painter
- Sulieti Fieme'a Burrows (born 1951), tapa cloth artist
- Mirranda Burton (born 1973), printmaker and graphic novel illustrator
- Fanny Buss (1910–1986), textile artist, fashion designer, printmaker and book illustrator
- Debra Bustin (born 1957), visual artist
- Grace Butler (1886–1962), landscape painter
- Margaret Butler (1883–1947), sculptor

== C ==
- Helen Calder (born 1955), painter
- Emma Camden (born 1966), glassworker
- Corrie Cameron (1904–1993), printmaker and painter
- Donna Campbell (born 1959), curator, weaver and textile artist
- Jenny Campbell (1895–1970), painter
- Rosemary Campbell (born 1941), painter
- Ida Carey (1891–1982), painter and art teacher
- Ruth Castle (born 1931), weaver
- Vera Chapman (1885–1953), painter
- Ellen Cheeseman (1848–1928), painter and botanist
- Madeleine Child (born 1959), ceramist
- Liyen Chong (born 1979), embroiderer, ceramacist and printmaker
- Bessie Christie (1904–1983), painter
- Fiona Clark (born 1954), photographer
- Tangimoe Clay (born 1960), weaver and textile artist
- Betty Clegg (1926–2009), watercolour painter
- Edith Collier (1885–1964), painter
- Alice Beville Collins (1884–1973), silversmith
- Octavia Cook (born 1978), jeweller
- Fiona Connor (born 1981), mixed media artist
- Dale Copeland (born 1943), collage and assemblage artist
- Ivy Copeland (1888–1961), painter
- Stella Corkery (born 1960), artist and drummer
- Paerau Corneal (born 1961), ceramicist
- Bronwynne Cornish (born 1945), ceramist, sculptor, educator
- Helen Crabb (1891–1972), pen and ink artist, painter and art teacher
- Ann Culy (born 1952), jewellery designer
- Vera Cummings (1891–1940), portrait painter
- Betty Curnow (1911–2005), painter and printmaker

== D ==
- Lily Daff (1885–1945), painter and illustrator
- Andrea Daly (born 1965), jeweller
- Judy Darragh (born 1957), sculptor, assemblage artist, photographer, painter
- Shona Rapira Davies (born 1951), sculptor, painter
- May Davis (1914–1995), ceramicist
- Eileen Olive Deste (1909–1986), photographer
- Pip Devonshire (born 1966), weaver
- Fran Dibble (born 1962), sculptor, painter
- Ngila Dickson (born 1958), costume designer
- Lynley Dodd (born 1941), children's book illustrator
- Alison Duff (1914–2000), sculptor
- Davina Duke (born 1975), ceramics artist
- Joan Dukes (1903–1993), illustrator
- Sarah Dutt (living), mixed media artist
- Dagmar Dyck (born 1972), printmaker, painter
- Rona Dyer (1923–2021), painter and wood-engraver

== E ==
- Audrey Eagle (1925–2022), botanical illustrator
- Gay Eaton (1933–2017), textile artist
- Vanessa Wairata Edwards (born 1980), printmaker
- Frances Dolina Ellis (1900–1971), artist, printmaker and teacher
- Lorna Ellis (1903–1981), sculptor and ceramist
- Jane Evans (1946–2012), painter
- Claudia Pond Eyley (born 1946), painter, filmmaker

== F ==
- Jacqueline Fahey (born 1929), painter and writer
- Lusi Faiva (living), stage performer and dancer
- Nicola Farquhar (born 1972), painter
- Joan Fear (1932–2022), painter
- Irene Ferguson (born 1970), portrait painter
- Di ffrench (1946–1999), photographic and performance artist
- Ivy Fife (1905–1976), portrait painter
- Charlotte Fisher (born 1959), sculptor
- Frances Fletcher (1846–1935), painter
- Luise Fong (born 1964), painter
- Selina Foote (born 1985), painter
- Tabatha Forbes (born 1972), botanical painter and textiles
- Patricia France (1911–1995), abstract artist
- Margaret Frankel (1902–1997), painter, potter, printmaker and art teacher
- Jacqueline Fraser (born 1956), multidisciplinary artist
- Hester Frood (1882–1971), painter and printmaker
- Elizabeth Fuller (born 1957), illustrator

== G ==
- Joanne Gair (born c.1958), make-up artist
- Briar Gardner (1879–1968), ceramicist
- Rosalie Gascoigne (1917–1999), sculptor and assemblage artist
- Kay George (born 1954), painter
- May Gilbert (1901–1977), printmaker and painter
- Suzanne Goldberg (1940–1999), painter
- Star Gossage (born 1973), painter
- Kohai Grace (born 1966), weaver
- Joan Gragg (born 1943), painter and sculptor
- Charlotte Graham (born 1972), painter
- Ayesha Green (born 1987), painter and sculptor
- Sarah Greenwood (1809–1889), painter

== H ==
- Alison Hale (born 1955), painter
- Amy Merania Harper (1900–1998), photographer
- Emily Harris (1837–1925), painter
- Christine Harvey (living), tā moko artist
- Niki Hastings-McFall (born 1959), artist and jeweller
- Rhona Haszard (1901–1931), painter
- Christine Hellyar (born 1947), sculptor, installation artist
- Louise Henderson (1902–1994), painter
- Rangimārie Hetet (1892–1995), weaver
- Veranoa Hetet (born 1966), weaver
- Georgina Hetley (1832–1898), painter
- Avis Higgs (1918–2016), textile designer
- Mabel Hill (1872–1956), painter
- Bessie Hocken (1848–1933), painter and photographer
- Frances Hodgkins (1869–1947), painter
- Ola and Marie Höglund (Ola 1956–2024, Marie born 1955), glass artists
- Katherine McLean Holmes (1849–1925), painter
- Esther Studholme Hope (1885–1975), painter
- Gabrielle Hope (1916–1962), painter
- Jean Horsley (1913–1997), painter
- Eleanor Hughes (1882–1959), painter
- Alexis Hunter (1948–2014), contemporary painter, photographer
- Mary Young Hunter (1872–1947), painter

== I ==
- Ruth Ige (born 1992), painter
- Ana Iti (born 1989), contemporary artist working with sculpture, video and text

== J ==
- Nicola Jackson (born 1960), painter
- Linda James (born 1951), painter
- Helen Varley Jamieson (born 1966), digital media artist, writer
- Eana Jeans (1890–1986), painter
- Ellen Jeffreys (1827–1904), painter
- Dorothy Jenkin (1892–1995), painter
- Megan Jenkinson (born 1958), photographer
- Jess Johnson (born 1979), drawer, animator
- Nina Jones (1871–1926), painter

== K ==
- Robyn Kahukiwa (1938–2025), painter and illustrator
- Emily Karaka (born 1952), painter
- Annie Elizabeth Kelly (1877–1946), portrait painter
- Flora Kelton (1925–2003), artist and sculptor
- Robyn E. Kenealy (born 1983), comic creator
- Martha King (1803–1897), painter
- Susan Te Kahurangi King (born 1951), pencil/ink
- Te Rongo Kirkwood (born 1973), glass designer
- Denise Kum (born 1968), artist

== L ==
- Sarah Laing (born 1973), cartoonist and author
- Lily Laita (born 1969), painter
- Maureen Lander (born 1942), weaver and installation artist
- Daisy Le Cren (1881–1951), painter
- Rozana Lee (born 1970), artist
- Saskia Leek (born 1970), painter
- Ranginui Parewahawaha Leonard (1872–1984), weaver
- Janet Lilo (born 1982), digital photography, video, and multimedia artist
- Connie Lloyd (1895–1982), etcher
- Bridie Lonie (born 1951/2), painter, academic and arts writer
- Ida Mary Lough (1903–1985), weaver
- Nikole Lowe (born 1973), tattoo artist
- Cheryl Lucas (born 1954), ceramicist
- Caroline Lush (1854–1945), painter
- Julia Lynch (1896–1975), portrait artist
- Vivian Lynn (1931–2018), multidisciplinary artist

== M ==
- Sophia Augusta Moore (1861–1945), painter
- Molly Macalister (1920–1979), painter, sculptor
- Jeanne Macaskill (1931–2014), painter
- Viola Macmillan Brown (1897–1981), painter
- Marian Maguire (born 1962), lithographer
- Rhea Maheshwari (born 1993), painter
- Toi Te Rito Maihi (1937–2022), weaver
- Catherine Manchester (born 1957), painter
- Dorothy Manning (1919–2012), painter
- Lina Marsh (born 1972/73), multidisciplinary artist and musician
- Sylvia Marsters (born 1962), painter
- Mata Aho Collective (formed 2012), mixed-media artists
- Liz Maw (born 1966), painter
- Elizabeth McClure (born 1957), glass artist
- Shona McFarlane (1929–2001), painter
- Mary McIntyre (born 1928), painter
- Lois McIvor (1930–2017), painter
- Rachael McKenna (born 1971), photographer
- Tui McLauchlan (1915–2004), painter
- Tanja McMillan (Misery) (born 1982), graffiti artist, painter and sculptor
- Sarah Ann McMurray (1848–1943), woodcarver
- Caroline McQuarrie (born 1975), photographer, textile artist
- Ellen von Meyern (1882–1912), portrait painter
- Judy Millar (born 1957), painter
- Marjory Mills (1896–1987), painter, embroiderer
- Margaret Milne (1917–2005), ceramicist
- Sofia Minson (born 1984), painter
- Merata Mita (1942–2010), filmmaker
- Shona Moller, painter
- Muriel Carrick Moody (1907–1991), sculptor, ceramist
- Bev Moon (born 1968), painter, knitter
- Peg Moorhouse (1917–2024), weaver and artist
- Julia Morison (born 1952), multidisciplinary artist
- Edith Emily Morris (1895–1965), jewellery designer, silversmith
- Elise Mourant (1921–1990), painter
- Marianne Muggeridge (born 1952), painter and screenprinter

== N ==
- Indira Neville (born 1973), comics artist, educator
- Kate Newby (born 1979), installation artist
- Jan Nigro (1919–2012), painter

== O ==
- Nina Oberg Humphries (born 1990), sculpture, photographer
- Ani O'Neill (born 1971), artist
- Daisy Osborn (1888–1957), painter, illustrator, jewellery designer
- Rona Ngahuia Osborne (born 1974), painter, textile and clothing artist

== P ==
- Pacific Sisters, collective of artists, performers, fashion designers, jewellers and musicians
- Evelyn Margaret Page (1899–1988), painter
- Fiona Pardington (born 1961), photographer
- Tania Patterson (born 1969), jeweller
- Joanna Paul (1945–2003), visual artist, poet, filmmaker
- Ruth Paul (born 1964), children's writer, illustrator
- Patricia Charlotte Perrin (1921–1988), potter
- Juliet Peter (1915–2010), potter and printmaker
- Margot Philips (1902–1988), painter
- Séraphine Pick (born 1964), painter
- Judy Pickard (1921–2016), painter
- Kim Pieters (born 1959), painter, musician and digital filmmaker
- Molima Molly Pihigia (born 1950/51), weaver
- Ada May Plante (1875–1950), painter
- Diane Prince (born 1952), painter, weaver, installation art practitioner and set designer
- Erenora Puketapu-Hetet (1941–2006), weaver, writer

== R ==
- Rachael Rakena (born 1969), digital artist
- Tia Ranginui, photographer based in Whanganui
- Rosanna Raymond (born 1967), installation artist, poet, and cultural commentator.
- Lisa Reihana (born 1964), video and multimedia artist
- Rangimahora Reihana-Mete (1899–1993), weaver
- Bridget Reweti (active since 2000s), photographer and moving image artist
- Kura Te Waru Rewiri (born 1950), painter, educator
- Pauline Rhodes (born 1937), sculptor, installation artist
- Gwyneth Richardson (1896–1980), watercolour artist
- Dolla Richmond (1861–1935), painter
- Dorothy Robertson (died 1979), painter
- Helen Rockel (born 1949), painter
- Yvonne Rust (1922–2002), potter and painter
- Frances Rutherford (1912–2006), painter

== S ==
- Kathleen Salmond (1895–1946), painter
- E. Rosa Sawtell (1865–1940), painter
- Emily Schuster (1927–1997), weaver
- Carole Shepheard (born 1945), printmaker
- Maud Winifred Sherwood (1880–1956), painter
- Jeena Shin (born 1973), painter
- Emily Siddell (born 1971), mixed-media artist
- Sylvia Siddell (1941–2011), painter, etcher, screen-printer
- Freda Simmonds (1912–1983), painter
- Tiffany Singh (born 1978), installation artist
- Susan Skerman (1928–2025), painter
- Yvonne Sloan (born 1941), weaver, textile artist
- Katherine Smyth, ceramicist
- Ella Spicer (1876–1958), painter
- Peggy Spicer (1908–1984), painter
- Vida Steinert (1903–1999), painter
- Elizabeth Stevens (1923–2008), painter
- Helen Stewart (1900–1983), painter

== T ==
- Yuk King Tan (born 1971), artist
- Mahiriki Tangaroa (born 1973), painter
- Salome Tanuvasa, multi-disciplinary artist
- Mary Taylor (born 1948), artist
- Diggeress Te Kanawa (1920–2009), weaver
- Cherie Templer (1856–1915), painter
- Saffronn Te Ratana (born 1975), mixed media artist
- Elizabeth Thomson (born 1955), painter
- Margaret Thomson (1910–2005), filmmaker
- Pauline Thompson (1942–2012), painter
- Te Wharetoroa Tiniraupeka, (1863–1964), weaver
- Ela To'omaga-Kaikilekofe (born 1969), visual artist and arts administrator
- Mollie Tripe (1870–1939), painter
- Merylyn Tweedie (born 1953), multi-media artist
- Marion Tylee (1906–1969), painter

== U ==
- Francis Upritchard (born 1976), sculptor and installation artist
- Colleen Waata Urlich (1939–2015), ceramicist

== V ==
- Juliet Valpy (1835–1911), painter
- Bianca van Rangelrooy (born 1959), painter, sculptor
- Erica van Zon (born 1979), ceramicist
- Lesley Vanderwalt (active 2010s), hair designer, make-up artist
- Kathleen Vane (1891–1965), painter

== W ==
- Lisa Walker (born 1967), jeweller
- Edith Wall (1904–2012), painter
- Elizabeth Wallwork (1883–1969), painter
- Emma Maria Walrond (1859–1943), painter
- Enga Washbourn (1908–1988), painter
- Ruth Watson (born 1962) photographer, sculptor, painter, installation artist and academic
- Alice Waymouth (1884–1963), metalworker and artist
- Marilynn Webb (1937–2021), printmaker, painter
- Christine Webster (born 1958), visual artist and photographer
- Ans Westra (1936–2023), photographer
- Annie Julia White (1852–1932), painter
- Robin White (born 1946), painter, printmaker
- Violet Whiteman (1873–1952), painter
- Alice Whyte (1885–1952), painter
- Areta Wilkinson (born 1969), jeweller
- Judy McIntosh Wilson (born 1937), sculptor, fibre artist
- Mary Wirepa (1904–1971), painter
- Christina Wirihana (born 1949), weaver
- Hilda Wiseman (1894–1982), bookplate designer, painter, calligrapher
- Sina Woolcott (1907–2003), potter

== Y ==
- Pauline Yearbury (1926–1977), Māori modernist art
- Charlotte Youmans (1869–1957), painter
- Adele Younghusband (1878–1969), painter, photographer

== Z ==
- Beth Zanders (1913–2009), painter

== See also ==
- List of New Zealand artists
- List of New Zealand women photographers
