= Rutland Group =

New Zealand art association formed by students from the Elam School of Fine Arts

Rutland Group or Rutland Arts Group was a New Zealand art association formed by students from the Elam School of Fine Arts in Auckland, New Zealand. The group took its name from the location of the original Elam Art School which was on Rutland Street. It is considered to have existed from 1935 through 1958. Members of the group, which changed over time, exhibited yearly. The shows were often covered by the New Zealand art press.

In 2002 an exhibit "The Rutland Group Revisited" was presented at the Kinder House in Auckland.

In 2004, a history of the group, We learnt to see :Elam's Rutland Group 1935–1958; a biographical journey with Auckland artists (ISBN 978-0-908943-27-2) was written by Ian Thwaites and Rie Fletcher.

== Artists associated with the Rutland Group ==
The history of the group "We learnt to see" lists over 100 artists associated with the group. This list is derived from that information, unless otherwise noted.

- Bertram Gordon Worth Battensby
- Elizabeth Mary Bisley
- Catherine Joan Blomfield
- Serville Bede Bourdôt
- Rosalie Brickman
- Helen Brown
- William Francis Buckley
- Eunice Boyle Cairns
- W.J. Capel
- Gordon Asher Cassrels
- Mary Frances Cebalo
- Bessie Christie
- Madge Clayton
- Clarice Coppard
- Ruth Mary Coyle
- J. W. Crippen
- Marguerete W. Crookes
- Pia De Podesta
- Cyril Gerard De Silva
- Winifred Percy Dixon
- Brian William Donovan
- Don Driver
- Vera Eleanor Dutton
- Nancy Edgar
- Winifred A. Edgar
- Ernest Edwards
- Joan Edwards
- Jean Farquhar
- Sybil Ferguson
- Joy Porter Field
- Esme Carter Freedman
- A. G. A. Funnell
- Briar Gardner
- Alex Garmonsway
- Charles Gentil
- Tui Ffrances Gifford Ward
- May Gilbert
- Olive Gillon
- Thelma De Lancy Green
- Rosemary Grice
- Cynthia Harper
- Jocelyn Harrison-Smith
- Isobel Blanche Hazelwood
- Louise Helps
- Arthur C Hipwell
- Jean Horsley
- Esme Carter Hughes
- Thelma De Lancy Hulford
- Frances Hunt
- A. J. P. Inglis
- Zoe Ireland
- Margaret Jackson
- Mary Elise Johnson
- Cyril Ewart Kelsey
- John Joseph Kingsford
- Ellen Jane Knight
- Harold Knight
- Eric Lee-Johnson
- Winifred Percy Leonard
- Valerie Gwen Lewis
- Joan Lillicrap
- V. Jean Livingston
- F. J. Macdonald
- Ellen Jane Mcgowan
- Vera Eleanor Mcmullen
- Dorothy Morton
- Trevor Douglas Salter Nichols
- Janet Sommerville Payne
- Edward William Payton
- Walter J. Pearce
- Alison Pickmere
- Janet Sommerville Pringle
- Mary Elise Putwain
- Hildegarde E. Read
- John Thornley Rhodes
- K. B. Robson
- Eunice Boyle Rout
- Winifred Rowe
- Helen Sandall
- Christine Smith
- Joan Winifred Smith
- May Smith
- Olivia Spencer Bower
- Peggy Spicer
- Agnes Hamilton Stanton
- Vida Steinert
- Ron Stenberg
- Marjorie Lillian Stuart
- A. D. Swinton
- Betty Thompson
- Fred Thorpe
- Eric Tice-Martin
- Louise Tilsley
- Ronald Tizard
- Marion Tylee
- Marjorie Vaughan
- Roland Vaughan
- Marie D'Arcy Vickerman
- Alice Maria Warren
- Marjorie Watson
- Robert Peter White
- Sina Woolcott
- Blanche Wormald
- F. H Wright
- Amy Sybil Gertrude Yorke
