= Tabatha Forbes =

New Zealand artist

- Born: 1972 (age 53–54)
- Education: University of Auckland's Elam School of Fine Arts
- Known for: painting, textiles
- Style: botanicals

Tabatha Forbes (born 1972) is a New Zealand artist known for her botanical paintings and textiles.

== Early life and family ==
When Forbes was nine years old, during a family trip to South Africa, her grandfather Ernest Forbes gave Forbes her first set of oil paint and paintbrushes and told Forbes she only needed four colours that were white, yellow, blue and red. At age 21, she was accepted into Elam School of Fine Arts, University of Auckland, but she did not pursue painting but instead focused on sound, art video and performance. In 2000, she lived in West Auckland. She later moved to Rarotonga, Cook Islands, with her family from 2011 through 2016 while she studied part-time for Doctorate in Fine Arts, and eventually graduated in 2016 from Elam School of Fine Arts, University of Auckland.

== Art career ==
While her family was living in Rarotonga between 2011 through 2016, her family was immersed with the locals and her children attended schools in Rarotonga. Her exhibitions in Rarotonga featuring 'ei katu (flower crowns) were well-received by the Rarotongan locals.

=== Selected solo exhibitions ===
- 2023: The Printed Hibiscus, Bergman Gallery, Auckland, New Zealand
- 2020: In Another Light II, Muse Art Gallery, Hastings, New Zealand
- 2017: 'Ei Katu, Bergman Gallery, Rarotonga, Cook Islands
- 2012: Takeaways: from the South Pacific, Seed Gallery, Auckland, New Zealand
- 2011: I Don’t Know Your Name (But I’ll Call You…), Corban Estate Arts Centre, Auckland, New Zealand

=== Selected group exhibitions ===
- 2023: State of Nature – Picturing the Silent Forest, Puke Ariki, New Plymouth, New Zealand
- 2020: Tatou 2, The Story of Us, Bergman Gallery, Rarotonga, Cook Islands
- 2011: Group Exhibition, Corban Estate Art Centre, Auckland, New Zealand
