= Helen Brown (artist) =

New Zealand artist

- Born: Helen Campbell Brown; 1919; Auckland, New Zealand
- Died: 1986 (aged 66–67)
- Education: Elam School of Fine Arts
- Known for: Painting

Helen Campbell Brown (1917 – 1986) was a New Zealand artist. Works by Brown are included in the Museum of New Zealand Te Papa Tongarewa.

== Career ==
Brown worked primarily in oils and watercolor. Works by Brown include: Old sheds, Avondale; The Doorway (1949); The Cove (1954); and Ebb Tide (1950).

Brown exhibited with:

- Auckland Society of Arts
- Canterbury Society of Arts
- Rutland Group
- The Group in 1949

Her work is featured in Christopher Johnstone's book Landscape Paintings of New Zealand (2013).
