= Erica van Zon =

New Zealand artist

Erica van Zon (born 1979) is an artist from New Zealand.

== Education and career ==
Erica van Zon completed a Bachelor of Fine Arts at the Auckland University of Technology in 2001. Following this, she studied at the Elam School of Fine Arts in Auckland, completing a Masters in Fine Arts in 2008.

Her artworks are held in the collections of the Dowse Art Museum, the Dunedin Public Art Gallery, the Sarjeant Gallery, and Wellington City Council. In 2011 she travelled to Beijing for the Wellington City Council / Asia New Zealand WARE Residency; in 2014 she was the Dunedin Public Art Gallery's Visiting Artist in Resident; and in 2016 she undertook the Tylee Cottage Residency in Whanganui.

Van Zon is based in Wellington and is represented by Melanie Roger Gallery in Auckland, and Jhana Millers Gallery in Wellington.

== Art ==
Van Zon works in a wide variety of media: sculpture, tapestry, embroidery, beading, photography, stained glass, and ceramics. Her practice is influenced by architecture; lost and abandoned objects, clothes, and places; film; novels; art history; pop culture; and the flow of information on the internet. From these wide-ranging elements, van Zon creates stitched scenes, tableau, and re-imagined artworks. Her work has been described as a way to "re-evaluate and re-observe the humdrum. We are faced with an artistic jamais vu, a state in which we look at the everyday and see it as a previously unnoticed object".

Her installation at the Dowse Art Museum Coffee Perhaps, for example, was inspired by Helen Hitchings, a gallerist in 1950s New Zealand who ran the country's first modernist dealer gallery. This installation combined elements of stained glass, printed scarves, sculpted wood, painted walls, and a famous Toss Woollaston painting recreated in embroidery. As evidenced in this show, modes of presentation—shelves, plinths, wall hanging apparatuses—are part of van Zon's artwork and carefully considered in relation to the exhibition as a whole.

This was also evidenced in van Zon's 2016 exhibition Opal Moon, Local Lime at the Sarjeant Gallery. Works in this show took the form of empty window frames and trellises, on which other works were hung. The mixed media artwork in this show also demonstrated van Zon's linked chain of thinking and making, many works related to the next, and formed a visual map of van Zon's time spent in Whanganui as the Tylee Cottage Resident.

Humour is an important part of van Zon's art practice. Her artworks often include visual puns, or funny mistakes as one medium is translated to another. For example, the Toss Woollaston painting mentioned above, is embroidered thickly in wool. She has commented, "I've been working with the idea of cognitive dissonance or distancing – how you imagine the world that you are reading, the disappointment when the world is created by someone else. I enjoy the slippage between reality and my clumsy way of making things. I love humour in art."

== Selected solo exhibitions ==
- 2019 6 Days in Samoa, Auckland Art Fair, Jhana Millers Gallery
- 2018 Peppermint Twist, Millers O'Brien, Wellington
- 2017 Opal Moon, Local Lime, Sarjeant Gallery, Whanganui, and Objectspace, Auckland
- 2016 Coffee Perhaps, SOLO, The Dowse Art Museum, Lower Hutt
- 2014 Dogwood Days, Dunedin Public Art Gallery visiting artist show
- 2013 The Light on the Dock, Hirschfeld Gallery, City Gallery Wellington
