= Hildegarde Read =

New Zealand painter

Hildegarde Egmont Read (née Dixon, 1892–1988) was a New Zealand painter. Her work is held in the collection of Auckland Art Gallery Toi o Tāmaki.

Read was born in Stratford, New Zealand in 1892.

Read studied at Elam School of Fine Arts, and her contemporaries included Bruce Roughton, Guy Mountain, Jocelyn Wilkie, and Samuel Marsh Williams. Read also studied at the Royal College of Art in London. One of her artworks exhibited in the Auckland Society of Arts 1929 exhibition was purchased for the City Art Gallery by the Auckland City Council. The work purchased was a "spirited sketch in sepia of the male figure." One of Read's charcoal drawings was reproduced in English art monthly The Studio.

In 1940, Read married Bert Read, and they lived in Grey Lynn, Auckland.
