= Salome Tanuvasa =

New Zealand–Tongan–Samoan artist

Salome Tanuvasa is a New Zealand artist of Tongan and Samoan descent. Her work is part of the permanent collection of Auckland Art Gallery Toi o Tāmaki. She is a multi-disciplinary artist and uses moving image, drawing, photography and sculpture. Her work explores themes related to her immediate surroundings and her family life.

== Biography ==
Tanuvasa was born and raised in New Zealand; her parents had migrated to the country from Tonga and Samoa. She began her art studies at Manukau School of Visual Art in Auckland. After one year's study she transferred to Elam School of Fine Arts at the University of Auckland, where she completed a Master of Fine Arts degree in 2014. The title of her master's thesis was My appreciation.

In 2012 and 2013, she was awarded the NICAI Summer Scholarship and worked with Fiona Jack on the Rosebank Art Walk and with Jim Speers on a project in Shanghai. In 2014, Tanuvasa's film work Expensive Moments was exhibited at a solo show at Gaffa in Sydney.

She had her first solo dealer show in 2018 with Tim Melville Gallery, titled In a Midnight Hour. Tanuvasa also works as an educator at Te Tuhi Gallery in Auckland.
