= Alison Blomfield Pickmere =

New Zealand secretary, interior decorator and artist

Alison Pickmere
- Born: 14 November 1908; Mount Eden, Auckland
- Died: 1971 (aged 62–63)
- Movement: Modernism

Alison Blomfield Pickmere (1908–1971) was a New Zealand artist and was prominent in the mid-century Auckland art scene. She exhibited in group and solo shows from the 1940s to the 1970s and her works are held in institutional and private collections across New Zealand.

== Early life ==
Alison Pickmere was born on 14 November 1908 in Mount Eden, Auckland. After school, she wanted to be an artist, but her family disagreed with this career path. She instead worked for an engineering firm as a secretary and part-time as an interior decorator. She also wrote articles for the magazine Home and Building.

== Art ==
In 1937, Pickmere studied at Elam School of Art, Auckland, for nine months. During this time, she joined multiple art groups, such as the Auckland Society of Arts (where she served as a secretary), the Hawke's Bay and East Coast Art Society and the Rutland Group. In 1947, she began studying at East Sydney Technical College in Australia. In 1963, she took art courses in Wellington with Paul Olds and then went to Europe to learn colour etching from Stanley Hayter.

Her paintings primarily depicted native flora and fauna that contributed to a national search for identity through the unique New Zealand landscape. She tended towards abstraction in her landscapes with a strong use of colour. Many of her semi-abstract landscapes drew inspiration from Northland and Auckland coasts. The 1960s saw her lean into the colour-etching technique, after her studies with the famed Stanley Hayter in Paris.

Pickmere's younger brother Ralph was an architect who helped design the National Women's Hospital in Greenlane, Auckland in the 1950s. Alison helped with interior design after researching the therapeutic effects of colour on patients.

In the 1950s, she exhibited with the Thornhill Group and in 1957 with The Group. In the 1960s, she exhibited at the New Vision Gallery, the Auckland Society of Arts, the Hawke's Bay and East Coast Art Society, the New Zealand Academy of Fine Arts, and other galleries in Sydney and Adelaide.

Upon the opening of the InterContinental Hotel in Auckland in 1968, Pickmere had four oil paintings selected to be hung in its lounges and 150 of her colour-etchings in guest rooms.

== Reception ==
She was complimented by the New Zealand Herald for her perceptiveness in representing the "New Zealand character" that is often overlooked by other artists. Imric Porsolt wrote about Pickmere in the Auckland Star, stating "Alison Pickmere is one of a generation which has helped so much to pull New Zealand painting up by its shoestrings." Porsolt highlighted her ability to adapt with a constantly changing art scene and believed her a key artist in the Auckland scene.

== Personal life ==
In 1949, Pickmere married Terence Thornton Bond, a publisher who was the nephew of New Zealand painter Charles Goldie. She continued to work under her maiden name.
