= Rona Ngahuia Osborne =

New Zealand artist (born 1974)

Rona Ngahuia Osborne (born 1974) is a New Zealand painter, textile and clothing artist. She has Māori (Ngāi Tahu/Kai Tahu), Scottish (Clan Fyfe/Clan MacDuff) and Irish (Clan Caduggan) ancestry. Her artwork is held in the permanent collection of the Auckland Art Gallery.

== Biography ==
Osborne was born in Auckland and raised in Hokianga. She has a Bachelor of Fine Arts from the Elam School of Fine Arts at the University of Auckland. She works in a range of media including textiles, painting, photography and audiovisual installation. Her work often features images of objects from early Māori–Pākehā trade, and imagery drawn from the natural environment, such as mountains, birds and plants.

Osborne produces textile work under the name Native Agent.

Osborne has collaborated with performance artists such as Louise Potiki Bryant, Atamira Dance Company and The New Zealand Dance Company to work on set and costume design for dance productions.

== Personal life ==
Osborne is married to artist Dan Mace.
