= Liz Maw =

New Zealand artist (born 1966)

- Born: 1966 (age 59–60); Wellington, New Zealand
- Education: Elam School of Fine Arts
- Known for: Painting
- Partner: Andrew McLeod

Liz Maw (born 1966) is an artist from New Zealand.

== Background ==
Maw was born in 1966 in Wellington, New Zealand. She graduated from the Elam School of Fine Arts in 2002. She lives with her partner, fellow painter Andrew McLeod in Mount Eden.

== Career ==
Maw is primarily a painter, working in oils. Drawing on her Catholic background, Maw's work melds religious iconography and contemporary issues. She also references European old masters but takes celebrities and modern characters as her subjects, including notable portraits of Francis Upritchard, David Attenborough, and Michael Jackson. Her fantasy figures often depict women and explore the idea of the femme fatale.

Selected exhibitions by Maw include:

- evil genius miscellaneous, 2010 Peter McLeavey Gallery (Wellington)
- What I Did Last Summer, 2011, group show at Peter Mcleavey Gallery (Wellington)
- For Oscar, 2011, group show at Peter Mcleavey Gallery (Wellington)
- New Paintings, 2011, Ivan Anthony Gallery (Auckland)
- The Montgomery Twins Dead End and Avercamp Machine Man Winter Scene, 2012, Peter McLeavey Gallery (Wellington)
- Pandora rides the noon day demon and I feel sorry for you, no, I really do, 2013, Ivan Anthony Gallery (Auckland)
- A Different View: Artists address pornography, 2013, Gus Fisher Gallery, University of Auckland, group exhibition
- summer field, Mary, Jacinda, and an English Artist from a magazine, 2014, Robert Heald Gallery (Wellington)
- Voicing the Visible: feminist art from the University Collection, 2014, Gus Fisher Gallery, University of Auckland, group exhibition
- Sam and Dani, Debi’s secret and The Future is Not what it used to be, 2016, Robert Heald Gallery (Wellington)

Maw is represented in Auckland by the Ivan Anthony Gallery and in Wellington by the Peter McLeavey Gallery.

Works by Maw are held in several public collections, including at the Auckland Art Gallery Toi o Tāmaki, Chartwell Collection, James Wallace Arts Trust, Museum of New Zealand Te Papa Tongarewa, and the University of Auckland.
