= Constance Bolton =

New Zealand artist

- Born: Constance Muriel Beard; 29 December 1884; Masterton, New Zealand
- Died: 30 March 1949 (aged 64)
- Known for: Painting
- Spouses: Edward Yates Bolton (m. 1922; div. 1929) Frederick Charles Renyard (m. 1937; died 1948)

Constance Muriel Bolton (née Beard, 29 December 1884 – 30 March 1949) was a New Zealand artist.

Born in Masterton, New Zealand, on 29 December 1884, she was the daughter of Spencer Francis Beard and Marion Rolleston Smith, and the eldest of four children.

Bolton was educated in England and returned to New Zealand in 1913 to study at the Elam School of Art in Auckland.

She married Edward Yates Bolton in 1922 and as an artist she was known under her married name (they divorced 1929). She travelled in the United Kingdom to study at the Royal College of Art in London and became an Associate in 1928. Returning to New Zealand in 1930, she married Frederick Charles Renyard in 1937.

Bolton exhibited with the New Zealand Academy of Fine Arts and the New Zealand Society of Artists exhibition in 1933.
