= Natalie Couch =

New Zealand artist

Natalie Couch (born 1976) is a New Zealand artist and landscape architect. Her artwork is held in the permanent collection of the Auckland Art Gallery.

== Biography ==
Couch was born in 1976. She graduated with a Bachelor of Fine Arts from Elam School of Fine Arts in 1998 and began exhibiting in 2003. She trained as a printmaker and is a member of the Māori print collective Toi Whakataa. She completed further study graduating with a Bachelor of Landscape Architecture in 2017.

Much of her artwork is in graphite on board, however in addition to drawing she also uses sculpture, painting, design and adornment in her practice. Couch's art explores how people respond to the tangible and intangible elements of their natural surroundings.

Couch is of Māori (Ngāti Tūwharetoa, Ngāti Te Rangiita and Te Arawa), Scottish, English and French descent.
