= Vera Cummings =

New Zealand painter (1891–1949)

- Born: 1891; Thames
- Died: 1949 (aged 57–58)
- Occupation: Painter

Veronica Cummings (1891–1949) was a New Zealand painter and a student of C.F. Goldie. She is known for her oil paintings of Māori people.

== Early life ==
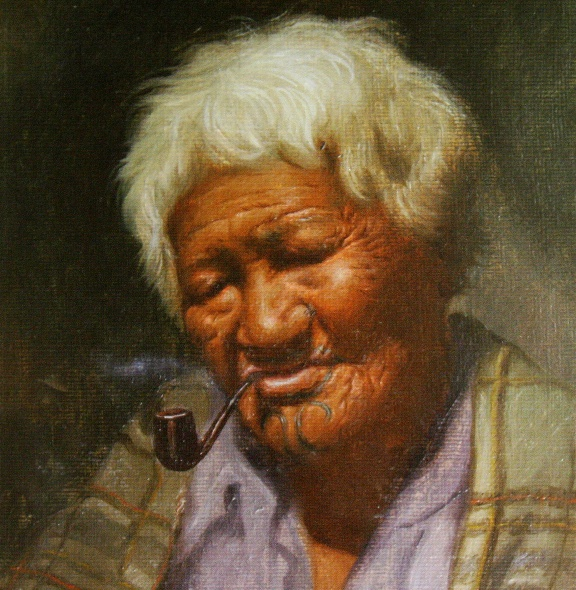
Maori woman smoking a pipe

Cummings was born in Thames, a small town in the North Island of New Zealand, in 1891. Her parents Matthew and Annie were of Scottish and Irish descent. The family later moved to Hamilton and Tauranga, followed by Auckland. There, Matthew worked in residential constructions, and built a number of large timber houses in the suburbs of Ponsonby and Herne Bay.

When Cummings was 11, she received a scholarship to attend Elam School of Fine Arts. She was one of the youngest students to study at the school, and while there studied under C.F. Goldie, a renowned portrait painter. She was considered the only student able to reproduce the colour of Maori skin as Goldie painted.

== Career ==
After graduating from Elam, Cummings continued to paint alongside Goldie, often sharing the same models – usually elderly Maori who lived in the Maori hostel near Parnell.

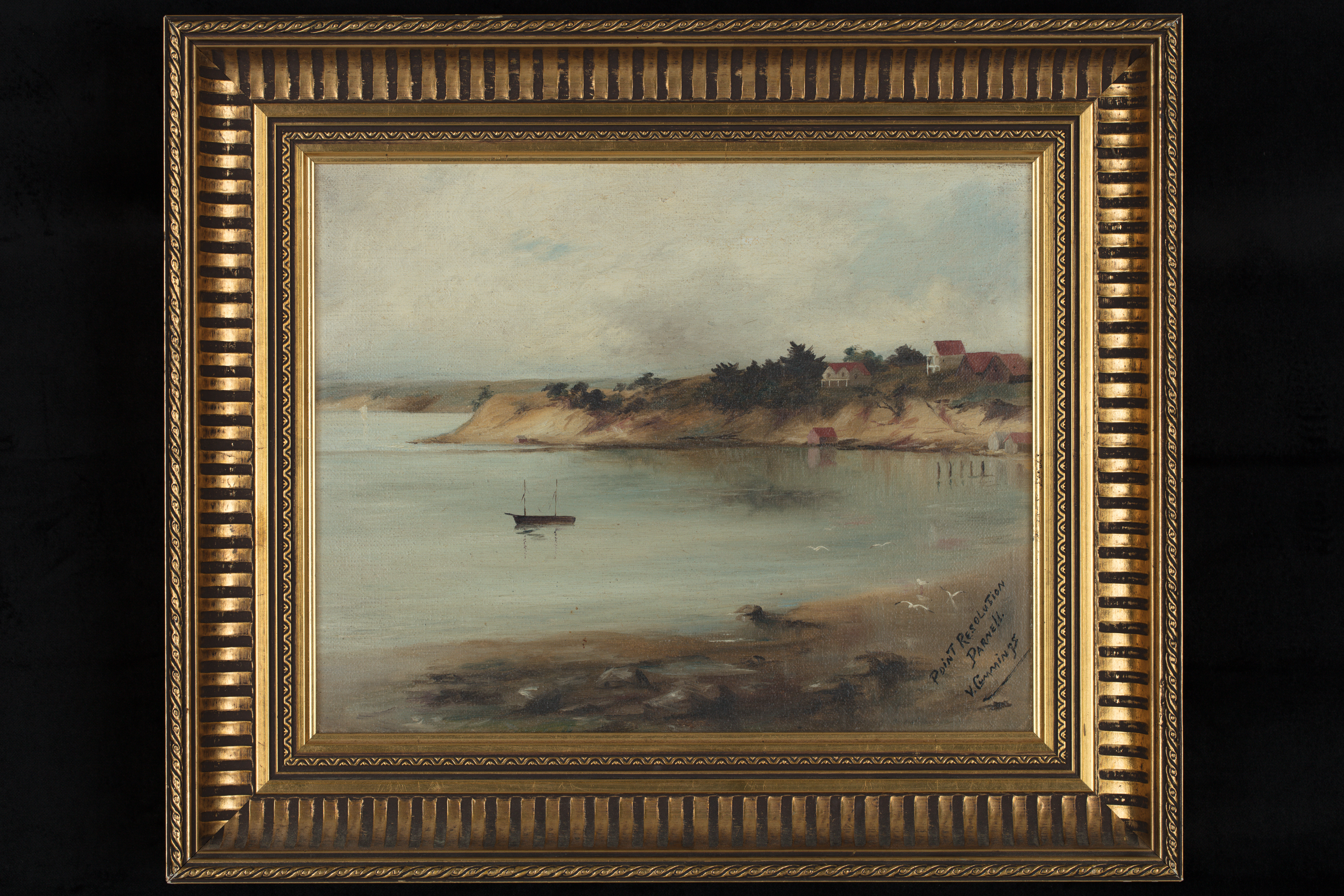
Point Resolution. Parnell

Cummings lived in Parnell near Judges Bay and died in Auckland in 1949, aged 58.

== Legacy ==
Cummings' paintings continue to sell for high prices at art auctions. In 2010, her painting of a Māori woman smoking a pipe, Kapai Te Toriri (Tobacco is Good) sold for NZ$10,600, although it had been expected to sell for NZ$3,00 – $4,000. Her painting Portrait of a Maori Woman is in the collection of the Auckland Art Gallery Toi o Tāmaki. In 2024 a portrait of a Māori man with a tā moko was sold in the United Kingdom to a New Zealand buyer for NZ$3790.
