= Sina Woolcott =

New Zealand artist

- Born: Sina Helen Gibson Woolcott; 24 August 1907; Ba, Fiji
- Died: 29 May 2003 (aged 95); Auckland, New Zealand
- Known for: Painting

Sina Helen Gibson Woolcott (24 August 1907 – 29 May 2003) was a New Zealand artist, born in Ba, Fiji.

Woolcott was educated at the Elam School of Fine Art in Auckland. She was a member of, and exhibited with:

- Auckland Society of Arts
- New Zealand Academy of Fine Arts
- Rutland Group
- The Group in 1950
