= Alice Maria Warren =

British born New Zealand artist (1882–1973)

- Born: 1882; Hemel Hempstead, England
- Died: 27 May 1973 (aged 90–91); Remuera, Auckland, New Zealand
- Other name: Glory
- Education: Elam School of Fine Arts

Alice Maria Warren (née Carr, 1882–1973) was a British-born artist, short story writer, poet and newspaper editor, who used the pseudonym Glory. She emigrated to Australia and then New Zealand.

== Life ==
Warren was born in 1882 in Hemel Hempstead, England. After her first marriage she became Alice Maria Carr-Tibbits.

She emigrated to Australia where she raised her three children. She remarried and became Alice Maria Warren. Warren studied singing at the Elder Conservatorium of Music, Adelaide, South Australia, then published the crime short story "The Valley of Silence" in The Australian Journal in 1924.

After moving to New Zealand, Warren was employed by Sun newspapers and the New Zealand Mirror. She later became "Lady Editor" of the New Zealand Observer. She was a member of the League of New Zealand Penwomen.

She studied at Elam School of Fine Arts, Auckland, then exhibited her paintings with the Rutland Group. As Glory Warren she exhibited at the Auckland Society of Arts.

She died on 27 May 1973 in Remuera, Auckland.
