= Susan Nugent Wood =

New Zealand writer (1836–1880)

- Portrait published in a 1901 newspaper
- Born: Susan Lapham; 21 August 1836; Great Swanport, Van Diemen's Land, Australia
- Died: 30 November 1880 (aged 44); Riverton, New Zealand
- Occupation: Writer
- Spouse: John Nugent Wood (m. 1854)
- Writing career
- Pen name: "A daughter of the soil"
- Notable work: Bush Flowers (1867)

Susan Nugent Wood (née Lapham; 21 August 1836 – 30 November 1880), published under the names A daughter of the soil and Mrs Nugent Wood, was a New Zealand poet, short-story writer and non-fiction writer. Born in Van Diemen's Land, she moved to New Zealand with her family in 1861 and wrote about her experiences of colonial life. Her poems, articles and stories appeared in publications including the Otago Witness and The Australian Journal, and she published three books, including the non-fiction advice book Women's Work in Australia (1862) and the poetry collection Bush Flowers (1867).

== Early life and family ==
Susan Lapham was born in Great Swanport, Van Diemen's Land on 21 August 1836. Her parents were farmers and her father was a probation officer, and the family lived remotely (probably on Maria Island). Wood said of her childhood that educational opportunities were scarce: "I pored over old books, and dreamed my own dreams about the outer world". In 1852, her father became the deputy sheriff for Portland, Victoria.

She married John Nugent Wood on 9 February 1854 at Portland. Their first daughter died at the age of about six months around 1857, and possibly two other daughters died in infancy. Her husband worked as a clerk on the Bendigo goldfields during this time. The family moved to Otago, New Zealand, in 1861, where her husband began working at the Gabriel's Gully goldfield.

The family lived in various places in the South Island over the next couple of decades, and moved to Riverton in the late 1870s. Wood gave birth to her first son in a tent by Lake Wakatipu in 1863, and to her second son at Nokomai in Southland in 1865. Her younger brother, writer Henry Lapham, also followed her to New Zealand.

== Career ==
Wood wrote poems, articles and short stories for publications including the Otago Witness and The Australian Journal, and published three collections of her work (two under the pseudonym "A daughter of the soil"). Women's Work in Australia, published in 1862, is described by Catherine Bishop as being "one of the few [women's] advice books written specifically for the Australasian market". The Otago Witness described her poetry collection Bush Flowers (1867) as being "of considerable merit".

Wood wrote about her family's life on the goldfields, the deaths in infancy of her three daughters, her love for her husband and two sons, her homesickness for Australia, and her Christian beliefs. She had an interest in ghosts and the supernatural. In 1869 she gave a public lecture about the spirit world as part of fundraising for a new hospital at Switzers; the Otago Witness noted that "the mere fact of a lady lecturing at all is such a novelty to the majority among us, that mere curiosity could not fail to draw a full house".

Although Wood earned money through her writing, she argued that a woman's place was in the home; in Women's Work in Australia she said "Woman is the helpmeet, the beauty, the glory of man". She saw women's domestic work as of equal value to men's work. Her entry in the Dictionary of New Zealand Biography notes that her work "provides insight into the life, aspirations and social attitudes of one pioneer woman and into the popular literary tastes of the time".

== Death and legacy ==
Wood died at Riverton of tuberculosis on 30 November 1880, aged 44. She was survived by her husband, at that time the resident magistrate of Ashburton, and her two sons. Her younger brother Henry Lapham died seven years later of the same illness; shortly before his death he had attempted to obtain a copy of Bush Flowers (then out of print), hoping to include Wood's poems in a publication about Australasian poets.

In 1905, the fourth volume of The Cyclopedia of New Zealand described her as a "pleasing and versatile writer of prose and verse", and recorded:

She was a highly valued and very popular contributor to the Otago Witness in the early sixties, and published a small book of poems, which attracted favourable notice throughout New Zealand, and is still treasured in many a bookcase.

== Selected works ==
- Woman's Work in Australia (Melbourne, 1862) (advice book published under the pseudonym "A daughter of the soil")
- Bush Flowers (London, 1867) (poetry collection published under the same pseudonym)
- Waiting for the Mail, and other sketches and poems (Melbourne, 1875), including contributions from her brother Henry Lapham
