= The Australian Journal =

Australian magazine (1865-1962)

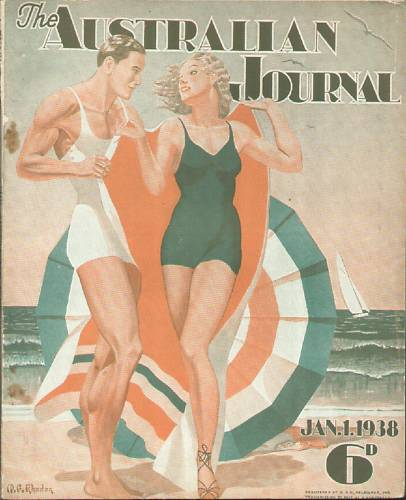
- The Australian Journal periodical. January 1, 1938.
- Editor: G.A. Walstab; Marcus Clarke (1870–71); R.P. Whitworth (1874–75); E. Kidgell (1875); William Smith Mitchell (1878 – 1909); R.G. Campbell (1926-1955)
- Categories: Literature
- Frequency: Monthly
- Publisher: Clarson, Massina and Co.
- First issue: September, 1865
- Final issue: April 1962
- Country: Australia

The Australian Journal was one of Australia's longest running and influential magazines, running for ninety-seven years from 1865 to its final issue printed in 1962. The magazine began as "A Weekly Record of Amusing and Instructive Literature, Science and the Arts", but gradually became a more focused publication of popular short stories written by Australian writers for readers across both genders and age groups.

== History ==
The Australian Journal began as a weekly publication for its first four years before stretching out to monthly issues. The monthly issues sold for 6d for a number of years, offering value for money in a marketplace where it was competing with publications from England. Each issue contained a variety or departments for both sexes and all ages, which attributed to its success. During the Depression and into World War II, the magazine maintained a circulation of around 100,000 in the 1930s and 1940s and peaked at 120,000 in 1945, a circulation that was second only to The Bulletin.

The Australian Journal supplied popular fiction to all Australians by offering a wide range of fiction of varying genres—adventure, romance, mystery, and crime/detective stories set in Australian cities or in the Bush. A typical issue of The Australian Journal was likely to include: a few serials headed by illustrations, a comic tale, half-a-dozen pages of advertisements, some full-page illustrations, several poems and short stories, a paper pattern illustration for a lady's frock, as well as a few non-fiction articles. The quality of the work varied throughout the issues, which likely played a part in the success of the magazine. The works ranged from the 'Sixpenny Dreadful' class of stories through to works of the highest literary standard. This allowed the journal a wide readership and works that would appeal to a whole family or peer group.

By the 1920s The Australian Journal was marketing itself as a literary magazine. The front cover of the August 1926 issue sports an illustration of a cowboy on horseback with a revolver in hand, with a line from a featured short story at the bottom of the page which reads: "'Shoot! And be d--- to you!' 'PARTNERS' - A Great Short Story in This Issue." The cover also advertises the inclusion of works by 'popular authors' Arthur J. Palk, W.D. Flannery, Rex Grayson, and H.G. Barwick. Although being aimed at both men and women, this particular issue seems to target adolescent boys. The journal had a wide range of subject matter on its covers over the ninety-seven years of its publication, with each issue perhaps targeting a specific audience to keep its readership as widespread as possible.

== Later era ==
In the 1950s editorial changes were made to modernise the magazine for a changing audience. Crossword puzzles were introduced, as well as a children's page, recipes, and fashion articles. This left less room for fiction works and blurred the magazine's focus. As the readership began to decline the size of the magazine reduced from 82 to 74 pages, and again to 66 pages until it folded in 1962. Television has been accused of aiding in the magazine's decline, but it is more likely the magazine failed due to a combination of issues, including changing habits in its readership and the magazine's dilution of its original concept and features in an attempt to move with the times.

== Notable contributors ==
- Roy Bridges
- Thomas Alexander Browne
- Ada Cambridge
- Marcus Clarke
- Mary Fortune
- Charles Harpur
- Ernestine Hill
- John O'Grady
- Vance Palmer
- Olaf Ruhen
- Alice Maria Warren
- Osmar White
- Susan Nugent Wood

== Editors ==
=== Marcus Clarke ===
Marcus Clarke was born in London on the 24th of April, 1846 and died in 1881. In 1864, Clarke set off for Melbourne, initially staying with his uncle. After a short stint working at a bank, he moved out to work on a station and discovered the beauty of the Australian bush, which would have a great influence on his writing. He continued to write and sketch, being a talented cartoonist and illustrator as well as a writer, and had his work published under the pen name Marcus Scrivener. Not long after leaving the station, Clarke found work in Melbourne as a member of the literary staff of the Argus journal.

Clarke's first (although unfinished) novel, Long Odds, appeared in serial form in the Colonial Monthly, yet he was only able to write a few chapters before being thrown from his horse and fracturing his skull. In 1869 Clarke took on the editorship of Humbug and around the same time married Marian Dunn. Shortly after this, Clarke began work on His Natural Life and spent a brief stint as the editor of The Australian Journal. Under Clarke's leadership , The Australian Journal lent a focus toward accepting submissions set in the colonies and by domestic writers.

Marcus Clarke greatly assisted the popularity of The Australian Journal by publishing his celebrated work, His Natural Life in serial format. Clarke later altered the story to better suit the longer form of a novel and renamed it For The Term of his Natural Life. The novel went on to garner widespread success in Australia, Britain and America and was also translated into German. The Australian Journal declared in 1881 that For The Term of his Natural Life should be "read by the youth of Australia and accepted as a classic." Clarke died at the early age of 35, robbing Australian literature of many more great works.

=== R.G. Campbell ===
Ron Campbell was a school teacher in the 1920s with the ambition of writing the great Australian novel. He submitted work to The Australian Journal and worked as a teacher and writer between 1922 and 1926 until he took over the editorship of The Australian Journal from his 81-year-old predecessor, Mr. Adcock.

Campbell was editor of The Australian Journal for just under thirty years, from 1926 to 1955. During this period the opportunities for freelance short story and serial writers peaked, with Campbell also placing a strong focus on publishing Australian writers and writing. In the decades before he was appointed editor, the magazine relied on a mixture of domestic work as well as syndicated fiction from overseas, in particular England and the United States. Campbell took his work seriously and although the publication aimed for a wide audience he begrudged the "'academics and highbrows' for suggesting that the Australian Journal 'was a trivial publication suitable only for the less knowledgeable type of housewife.'" Yet he, himself, wrote that The Australian Journal readers were "mainly women, with limited literary tastes and expectations." Campbell endeavoured to develop continued relationships with the Australian writers that contributed to the Journal during his editorship, and to encourage younger writers trying to build their careers. By the 1940s, The Australian Journal was one of the few Australian periodicals that was willing to pay its contributors a competitive rate for their submissions. However, it was during this time that Campbell complained of the declining number of Australian writers able to produce quality work in the short story format, stating that "the fact remains that of late years the number of writers who can turn out the well-constructed and characteristic yarn of between 5,000 and 6,000 words seems to be diminishing." Campbell went on to create an anthology of works featured in The Australian Journal during his editorship. The collection was titled The Australian Journal Story Book, but was never published. Campbell had a semi-regular editorial column in the Journal that he titled 'In Passing'.

The importance of Campbell's work as editor of The Australian Journal and his contribution to Australian literature can be seen in the dedications to Campbell in novels from authors such as Robert S. Close and S.H. Courtier.
