= May Gilbert =

New Zealand artist (1901–1977)

May Oswald Gilbert (16 May 1901 – 21 May 1977) was a New Zealand printmaker and artist, working in watercolours, oils and acrylics. Her work is held in the Christchurch Art Gallery.

== Biography ==
Gilbert was born in 1901 in Parnell, Auckland, the eldest of three sisters; her brother, her sisters, and her all shared the middle name Oswald. The family drapery and haberdashery shop, known as "Paris House", was on Parnell Road opposite St John's Catholic Church. Gilbert attended Epsom Girls' Grammar School, winning a Senior National Scholarship in 1919, and entered Elam School of Fine Arts in 1920, returning in the mid-1930s and attending classes in life drawing and landscapes every year until the early 1940s. She also studied at the private art school Le Foyer.

Gilbert was a member of the Auckland Society of Arts for over 45 years, from 1930 to 1976. She exhibited a set of linocuts there in 1932, and also exhibited with the New Zealand Academy of Fine Arts (1931–42), the Nelson Suter Art Society, and the Canterbury Society of Arts. She was a member of the Rutland Group in Auckland, appearing regularly in catalogues and art reviews between 1938 and 1952. She worked in oil and watercolour, often painting around Auckland with her friend Peggy Spicer; she was also friends with the artists Bessie Christie, Hilda Wiseman, and Dorothy Morton.

Gilbert was an art teacher in the 1930s and 1940s, initially at St. Cuthbert's College from 1937 to 1940. She also taught arts and crafts and drawing at the Diocesan School for Girls, which her sisters had attended from 1920 to 1927.

Gilbert never married and spent much of her time looking after other family members, regularly taking the harbour ferry to Devonport for example and walking to Bayswater to baby-sit and return the next day. Art was practised when time permitted, and generally not discussed with her family, though all were aware of her abilities. She travelled overseas twice, producing paintings and sketches each time: first to Hobart, and then in the 1950s to the Cotswolds.

She died in on 21 May 1977, five days after her 76th birthday, leaving paintings to the Auckland Society of Arts to help with their fundraising. She is buried in Purewa Cemetery, Auckland.
