= Caroline Lush =

New Zealand artist

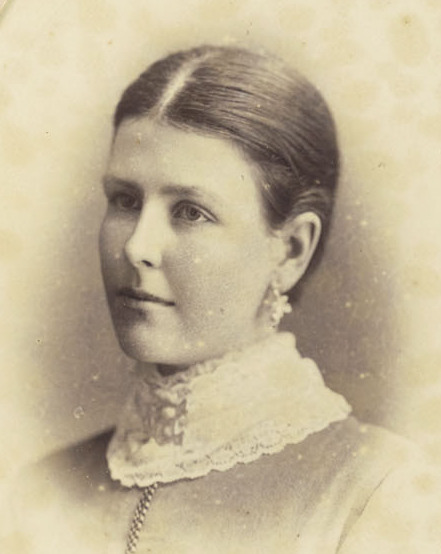
- Caroline Lush
- Born: Caroline Ellen White; 18 June 1854
- Died: 5 November 1945 (aged 91)
- Resting place: St Stephen's Cemetery, Parnell, Auckland
- Spouse: John Martin Hawkins Lush
- Children: 4
- Awards: Auckland Free School of Art Silver Medal

Caroline Ellen Lush (née White) (18 June 1854 - 5 November 1945) was a New Zealand artist. She began painting at age 10 and attended Auckland Free School of Art. Lush primarily painted New Zealand flora and fauna, and a large number of her paintings are now part of the archive of Ewelme Cottage.

== Biography ==
Lush was born Caroline Ellen White, the second daughter of William Bertram White, a magistrate, and Eliza Chitty (Clendon) White on 18 June 1854. On 5 April 1883, she married John Martin Hawkins Lush, a lawyer and the third son of Archdeacon Vicesimus Lush. She is referred to as Carrie White in the journals of Archdeacon Lush and his wife Blanche. Archdeacon Lush comments that both Caroline Lush and her sisters are talented artists, including Fanny White who had won a silver medal in a local competition.

Lush began painting at age 10, and primarily painted New Zealand native flora and fauna. She attended Auckland Free School of Art, which was founded by Sir John Logan Campbell in 1878, and closed in 1889 upon the creation of the Elam School of Art and Design. In March 1884, as a student of Auckland Free School of Art, Lush won a medal for her work "Copy from the flat".

A large number of her paintings are part of the archive of Ewelme Cottage, the house built by Archdeacon Lush, which was gifted, along with its contents, to the public in 1971.

She died on 5 November 1945 and is buried in St. Stephen's Cemetery, Parnell.

== Botanical illustrations ==
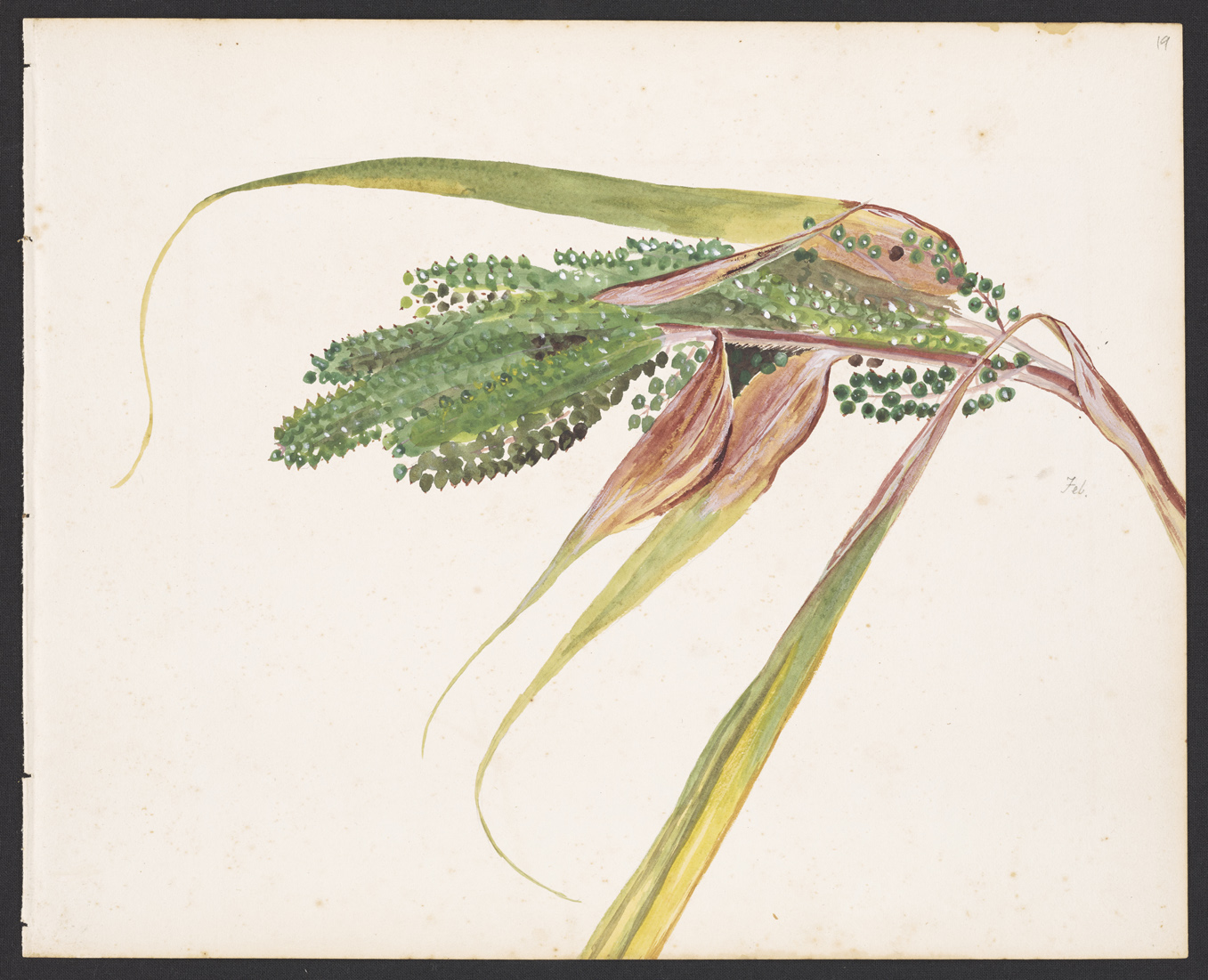
Lush, Caroline. Botanical illustration

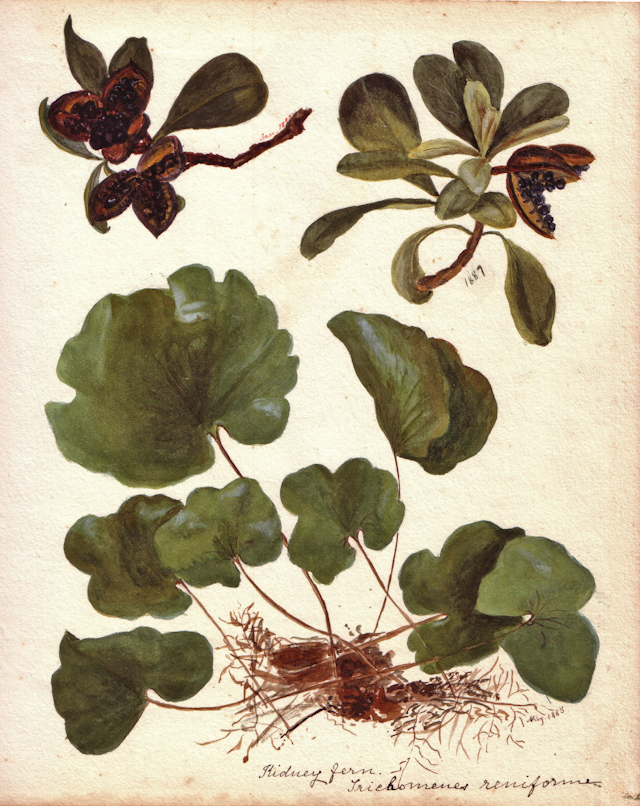
Lush, Caroline. Kidney fern.

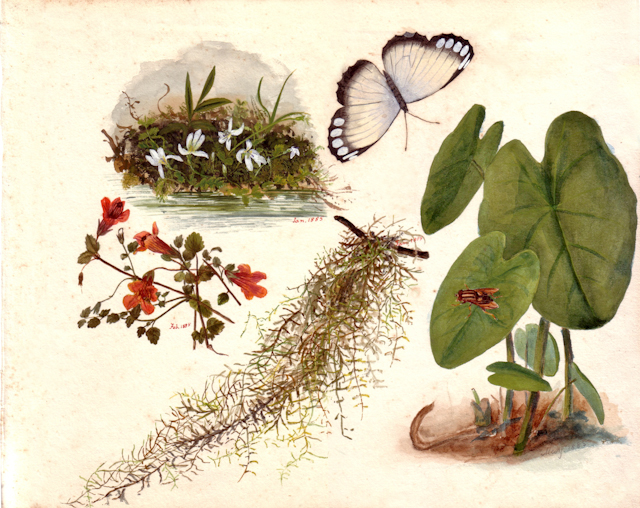
Lush, Caroline. Botanical and insect illustrations

== See also ==
- Botanical Illustration
