= Vida Steinert =

New Zealand painter

- Born: Vida Isabella Vickers; 24 January 1903; Hamilton, New Zealand
- Died: 27 February 1999 (aged 96); Auckland, New Zealand
- Education: Elam School of Fine Arts
- Known for: painting
- Notable work: The Valley, Ponies at the fair, Road to Colville, Spanish Dancer
- Movement: Modernism

Vida Isabella Steinert (née Vickers; 24 January 1903 – 27 February 1999) was a New Zealand painter, born in Hamilton, New Zealand. Also known as Vida Isabella Vickers, Vida Isabella Steinert, or Vida Steinhart.

== Education ==
A graduate of the Elam School of Fine Arts, Auckland, Steinert was part of the Rutland Group of painters, alongside Jack Crippen and Ruth Coyle. During her career she was based in Auckland, and associated with painters Charles Tole, Bessie Christie, Helen Brown, Joan Lillicrap, Joycelyn Harrison-Smith, and Alison Pickmer.

== Career ==
A modernist painter, her work often depicted life in New Zealand, specifically local people and landscapes. Steinert worked primarily in oils, watercolors, and pencils. Her works include: The Valley; Ponies at the fair; Road to Colville; and Spanish Dancer.

=== Exhibitions ===
In 1950, Steinert exhibited with The Group, an informal art association from Christchurch, New Zealand, that formed to provide a freer alternative to the Canterbury Society of Arts. Steinert also exhibited with the Rutland Group and the Auckland Society of Arts.
