= Ellen von Meyern =

New Zealand painter

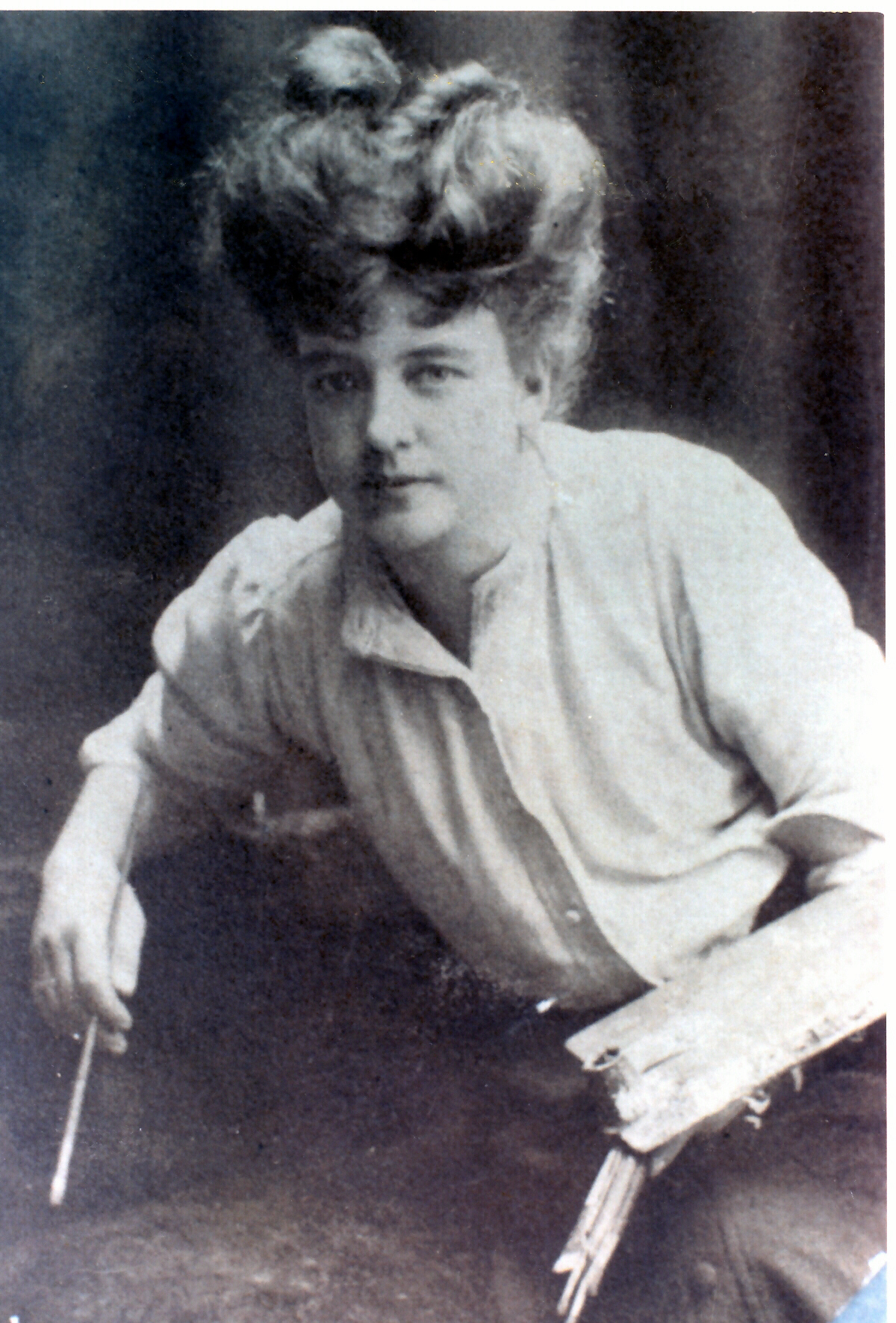
- Ellen von Meyern in her studio circa 1910.
- Born: 26 December 1881
- Died: 1912 (aged 30–31)

Ellen von Meyern (1882-1912) was a New Zealand artist who is remembered for her portraits of Maori people.

== Biography ==
Von Meyern was the daughter of Arthur von Meyern. Around 1895, she moved from Dunedin to Auckland, where she studied portraiture at the Elam School of Art. Her work includes portraits of her sister Blanche, with whom she shared a studio, and of music and theatre celebrities. Examples of her paintings can be seen in the National Museum of New Zealand. Von Meyern's Maori paintings are, like many by Gottfried Lindauer and Frances Hodgkins, associated with symbolist portraits of demure females with or without a child.

Her portrait of Prime Minister Richard Seddon is in the collection of the Auckland Art Gallery Toi o Tāmaki.

She died in October 1912.

== Gallery ==
Works by Ellen von Meyern

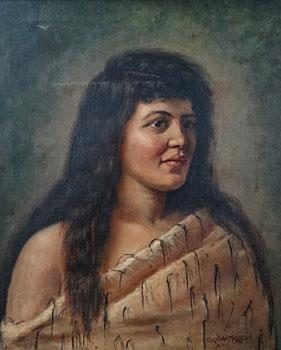
Maiden

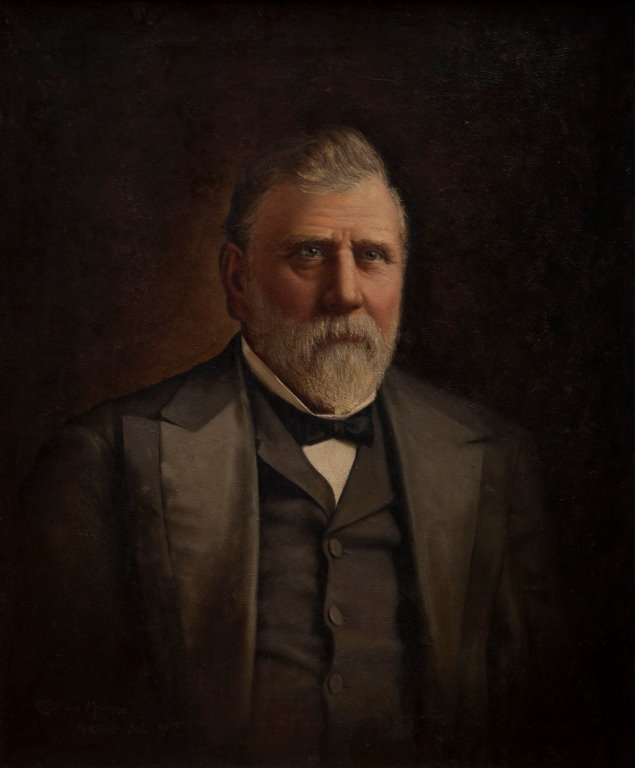
Richard Seddon

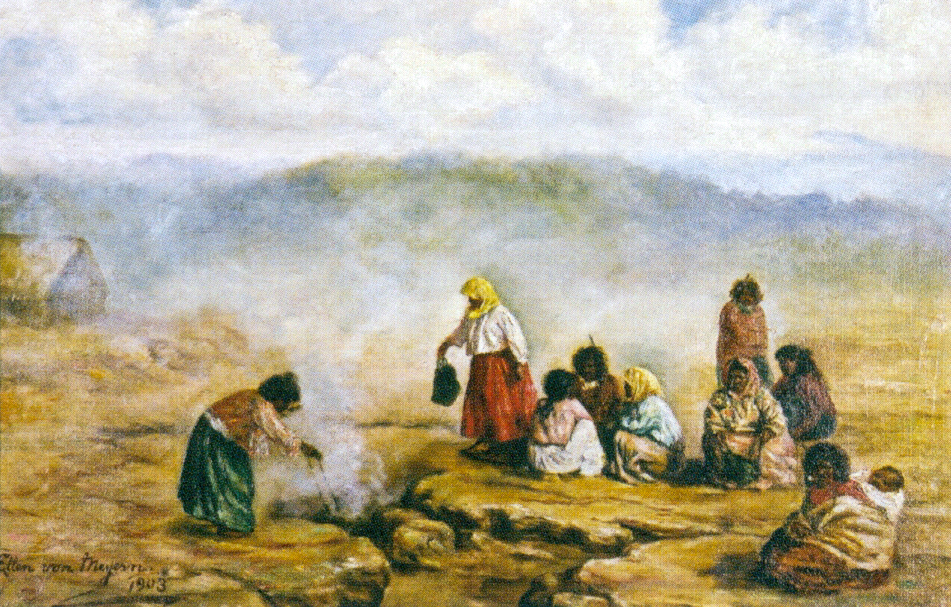
Maori women and children cooking at Geothermal Hangi Pit

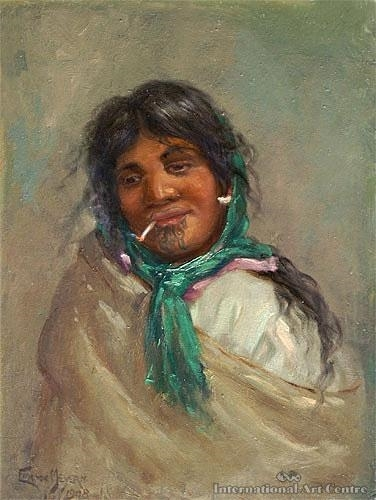
Day Dreams
