= Edward William Payton =

- Born: 21 May 1859; Warwickshire, England
- Died: 2 October 1944 (aged 85); Tauranga, New Zealand

Edward William Payton (21 May 1859 – 2 October 1944) was a photographer and painter in New Zealand.

Payton was born in Warwickshire, England. He studied art at the Municipal School of Art Birmingham under E. R. Taylor. He has received several medals and prizes in national competitions. He also studied at the Royal College of Art, as well as in Antwerp and Paris.

In 1882 he left for Australia, and in early 1883 from Melbourne he travelled further to New Zealand. Starting from the southern coastal town of Bluff he travelled wide and far in the country, making sketches and photos about the countryside and Maori people.

He settled down in Auckland and from there he visited the Hot Lakes district. He has seen and painted the Pink and White Terraces before and after the Mount Tarawera eruption.

In 1887 he exhibited in the Auckland Art Gallery, and in 1888 he published Round About New Zealand, a folio of etchings of Auckland and Rotorua. He became the first director of the Elam School of Art in 1890, a post which he held for 35 years, retiring in 1924. In 1930, he travelled to Europe and added to the Mackelvie Collection in Auckland Art Gallery by the purchase on behalf of the trustees of 134 paintings and about 100 prints.

In later life he settled in Rotorua. He died in Tauranga at the age of 85 on 2 October 1944.

== Gallery ==
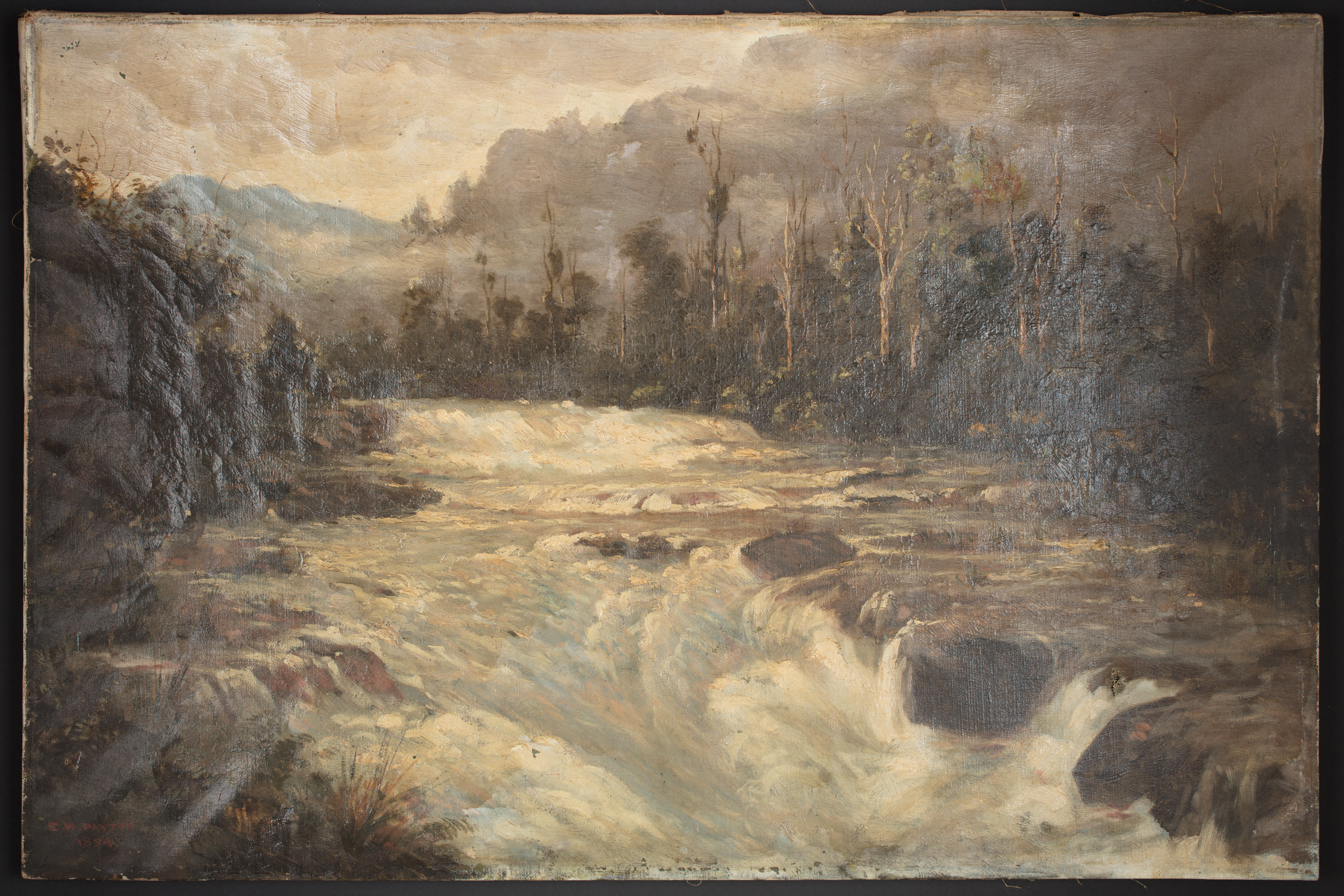
Aratiatia Rapids (1894)

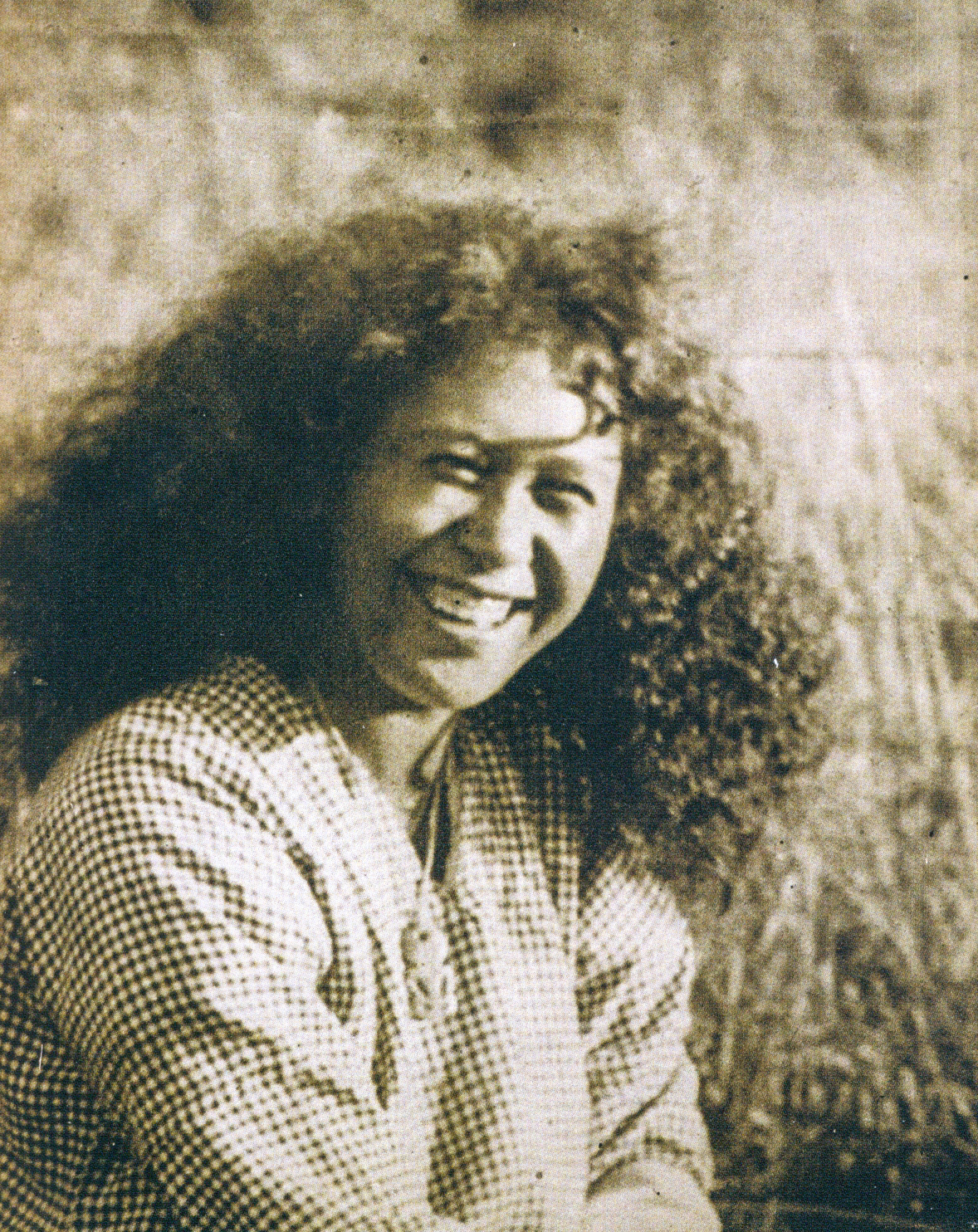
Study of a Maori Woman

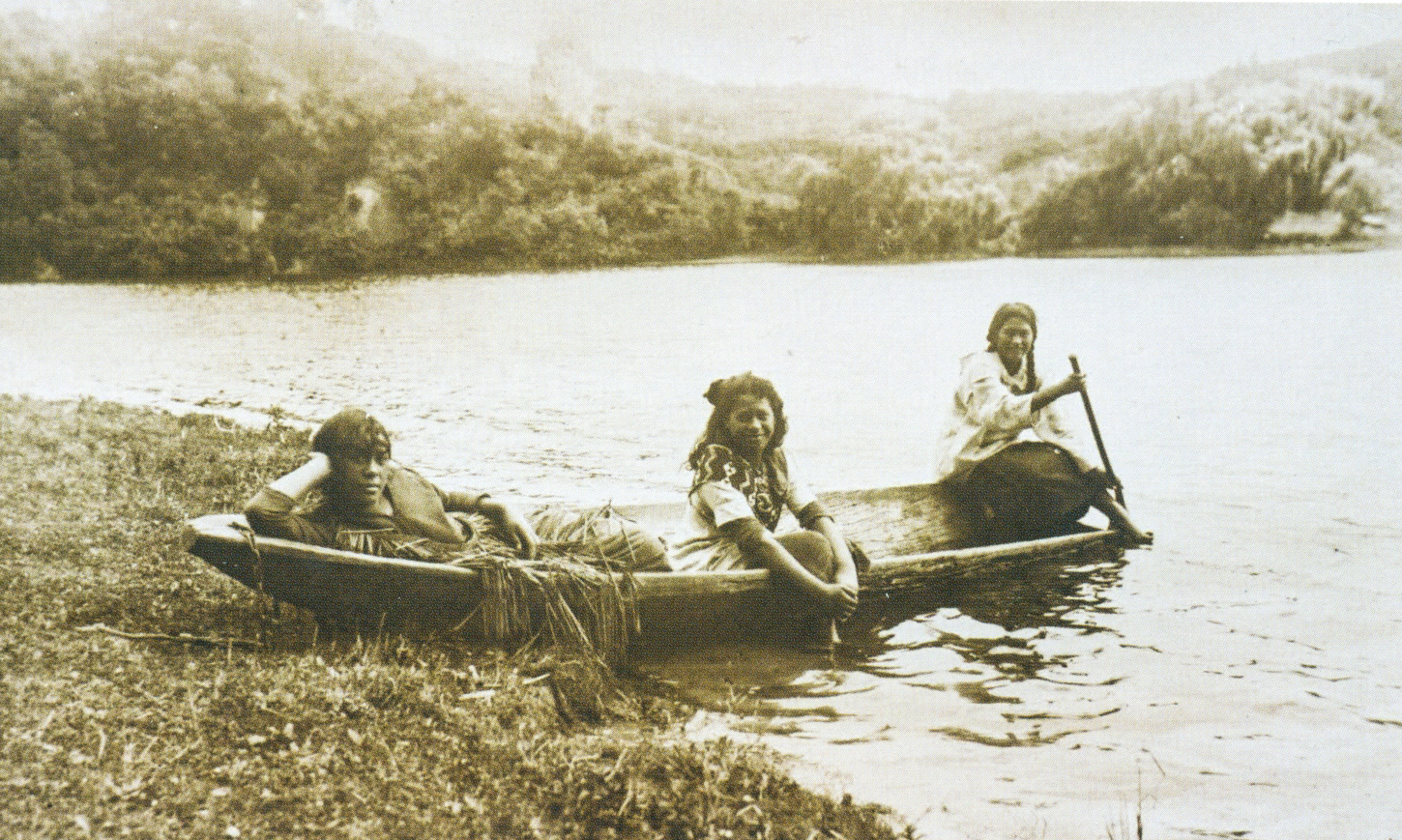
Three Women in a Waka, Rotoiti

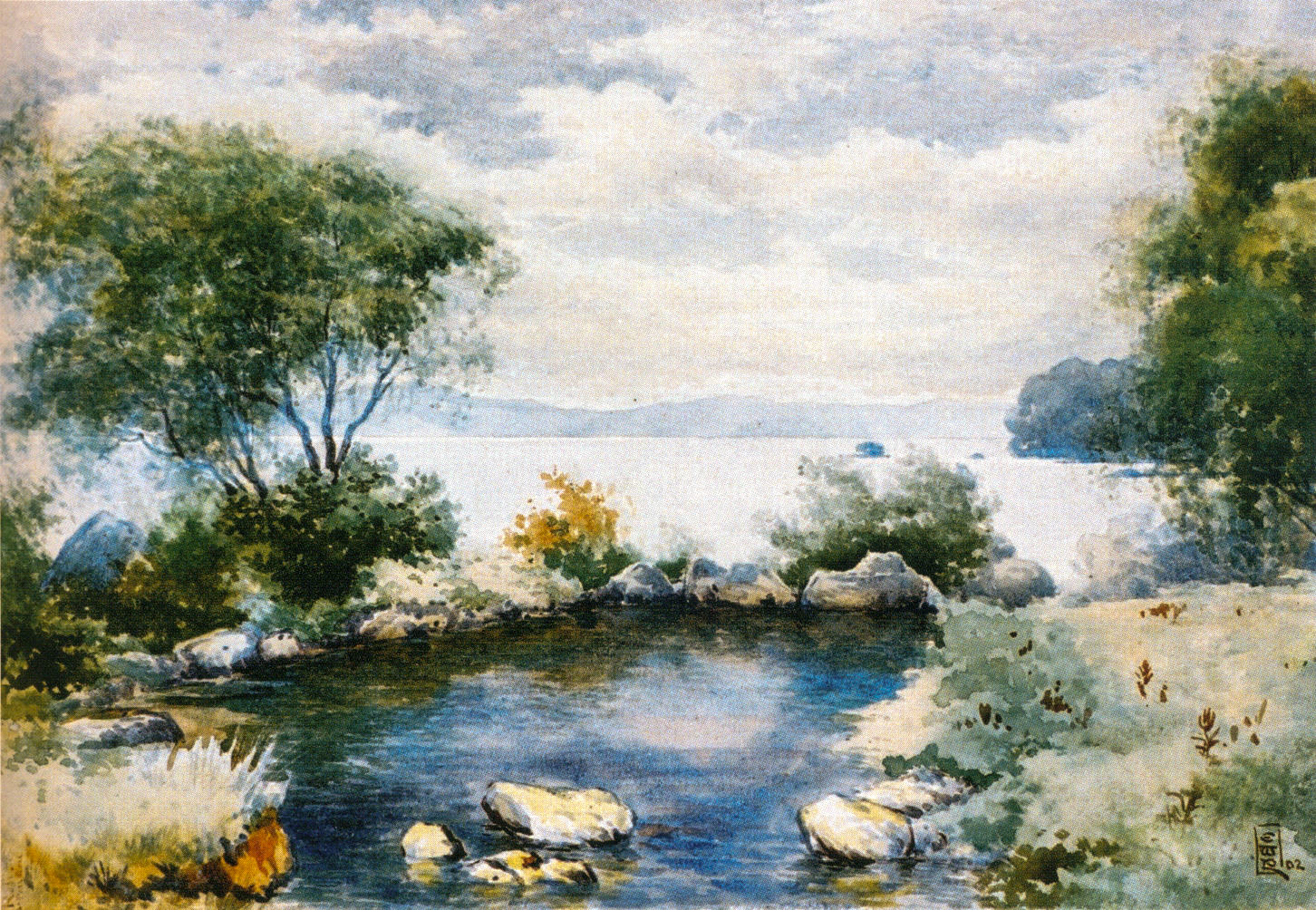
Hinemoa's Bath, Mokoia Island, Lake Rotorua (1902)

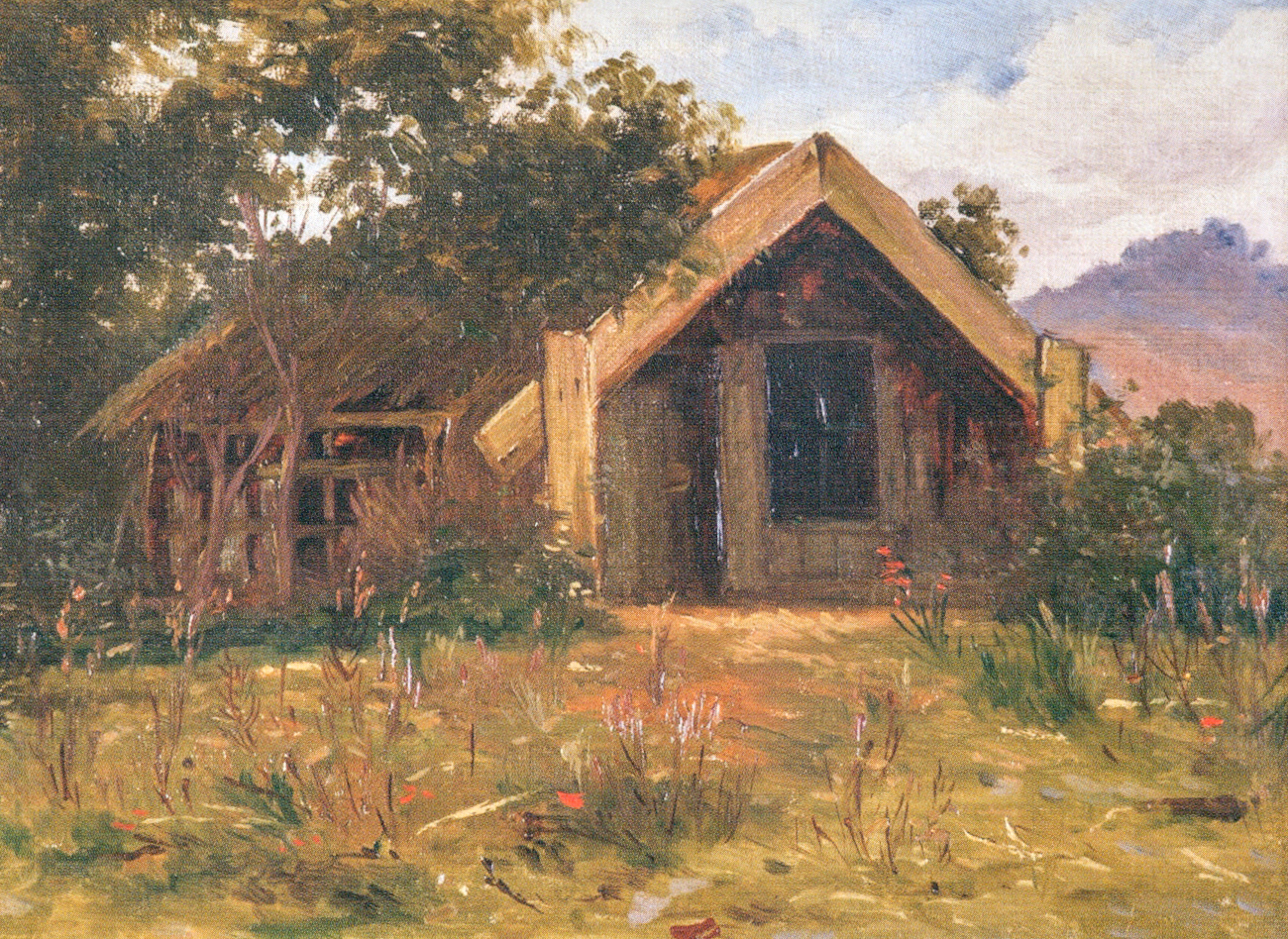
Deserted Whare near Rotorua (c. 1910)
