= Bessie Christie =

New Zealand artist (1904–1983)

- Born: Elizabeth Froomes Christie; 3 August 1904; Wellington, New Zealand
- Died: 9 March 1983 (aged 78); Auckland, New Zealand
- Education: Elam School of Fine Art
- Known for: Painting

Elizabeth Froomes Christie (3 August 1904 – 9 March 1983) was a New Zealand painter.

== Career ==
Born in Wellington on 3 August 1904, Christie trained at the Elam School of Fine Art at the University of Auckland. She taught art at Takapuna Grammar School between 1935 and 1940.

During World War II she was a driver in the New Zealand Women's Auxiliary Army Corps and her paintings were included in the 1944 Artists in Uniform exhibition.

Although Christie did paint some landscapes in oils, she preferred to break with her contemporaries and depict vibrant social scenes, specifically set in Auckland. Works include: Geddes' Stable Yard and Tobacco Queue, Karangahape Rd, Auckland.

During her career she was represented by the Auckland Art Gallery.

=== Exhibitions ===
Christie exhibited with the Auckland Society of Arts (of which she was a member from 1933) throughout the 1950s, exhibiting alongside A. Lois White, May Smith, Helen Brown, and Frances Hunt.

She also exhibited with the New Zealand Academy of Fine Arts and the Rutland Group, an organisation formed by students from the Elam School of Fine Art.

== Death ==
Christie died in Auckland on 9 March 1983, and her body was cremated at Purewa Crematorium.
