= Briar Gardner =

New Zealand Potter and speech therapist

- Born: Maria Louisa "Briar" Gardner; 29 July 1879; Hobsonville, Waitemata County, New Zealand
- Died: 20 October 1968 (aged 89); Auckland
- Known for: Pottery

Maria Louisa "Briar" Gardner (29 July 1879 – 20 October 1968) was one of New Zealand's first studio potters and later in life a speech therapist.

Gardner's nephew Tom Clark founded the Amalgamated Brick and Pipe Company in the 1930s. As an advisor, Gardner encouraged and facilitated the employment of women within the company. With guidance from Gardner, they later expanded into domestic ware and became known as Crown Lynn.

== Early life ==
Gardner was born on 29 July 1879 in Hobsonville to Louise (née Clark) and John Gardner. As a child she was tutored at home before spending two years at Araparera School after it opened in 1893.

Growing up, her family was involved in the pottery and brick-making industry: her uncles owned the Amalgamated Brick and Pipe Company, while three of her brothers established a brickworks in 1902 in New Lynn. Gardner moved to New Lynn with her brothers.

== Career ==
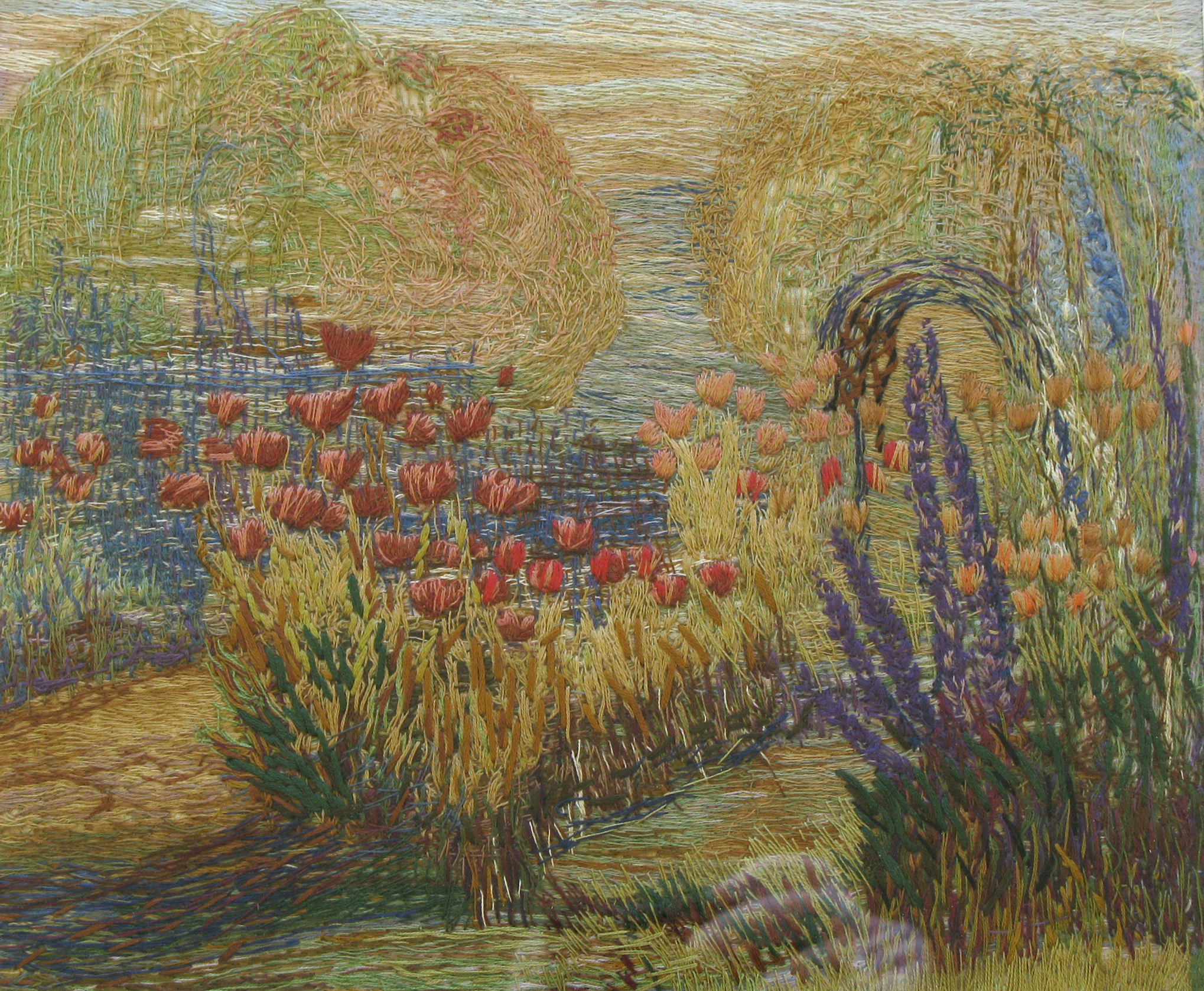
Wool and cotton embroidered picture of a flower garden at Bourne-End-on-Thames, England by Briar Gardner, c. 1940.

Gardner became increasingly interested in creative arts and began embroidery, tapestry and painting, spending some time in Australia studying these crafts and exhibiting her decorative needlework in Auckland in 1920. She began taking classes at Elam School of Fine Arts, studying sculpture under William Wright and learning about Māori design from artist and illustrator Trevor Lloyd.

Gardner became interested in pottery when English potter William Speer came to work at New Lynn on a newly installed pottery wheel. Although he was largely discouraging, she began to teach herself pottery, beginning at 5.30am and working for two hours until Speer came to work at 7.30 am. She experimented with different glazes and decorating materials, experiencing technical difficulties in her early works.

During the 1930s, her skill and recognition developed. She began regularly exhibiting her pottery through the Auckland Society of Arts in 1930. In 1937 she exhibited with the Waikato Society of Arts alongside four other women artists. The following year, she established a kiln and pottery studio at her family home. During the war years, demand for her work increased, and her work was sold throughout New Zealand, but particularly at the Auckland departments stores Smith & Caughey's and Milne & Choyce. Her pottery was also exported to Australia at times. However, nearing the end of her practice she kept her production manageable for just herself.

== Style ==
In the mid-1930s, Gardner “was praised for the marked development in her work, particularly her use of ‘soft harmonious colourings’, ‘flowing glazes’ and Maori and indigenous plant motifs.”

=== Mottled pieces in collections ===
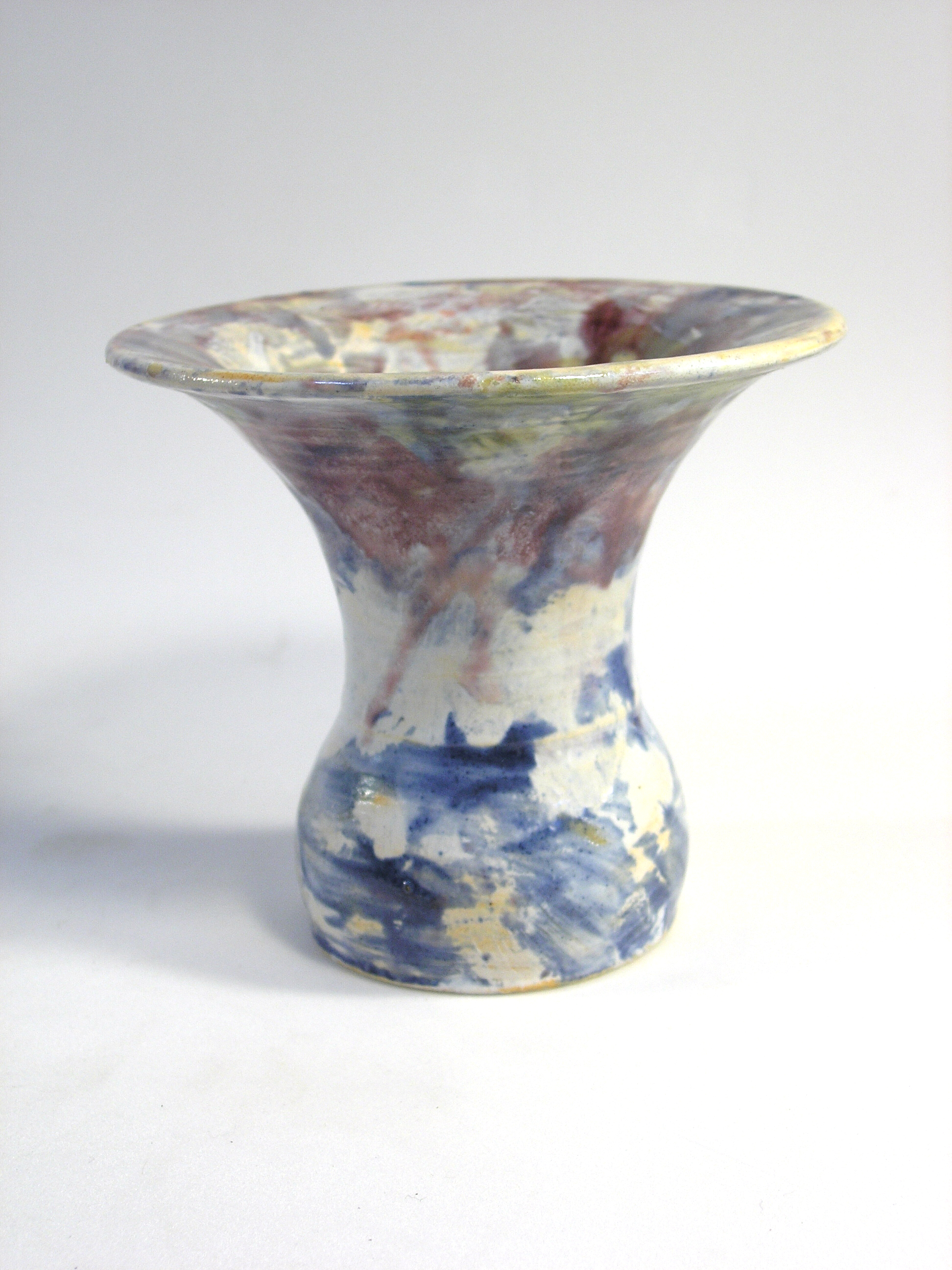
Mottled Flared Vase by Briar Gardner, 1930s/1940s, Auckland War Memorial Museum

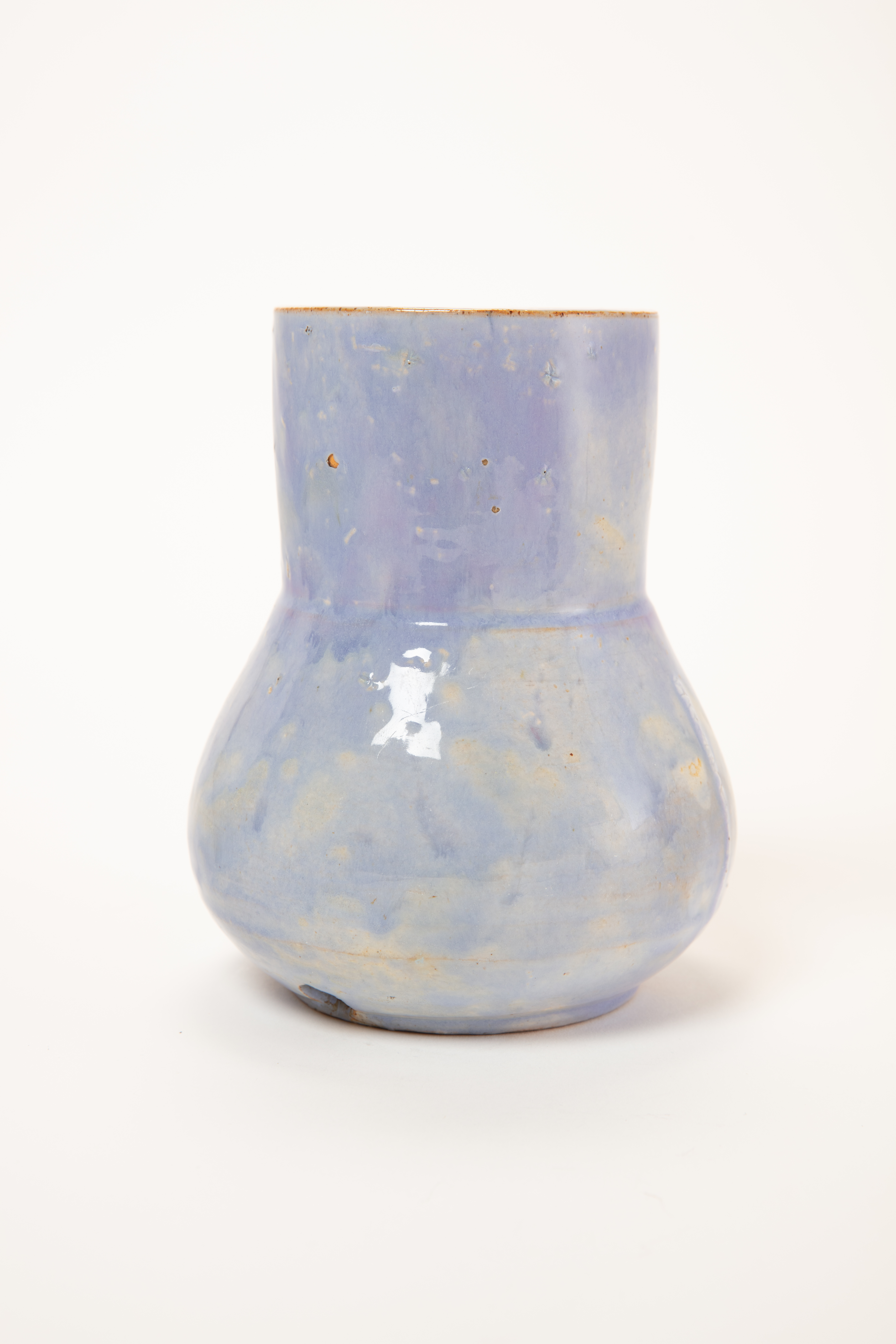
Straight Sided Neck Pale Blue Vase by Briar Gardner (Front) Auckland War Memorial Museum

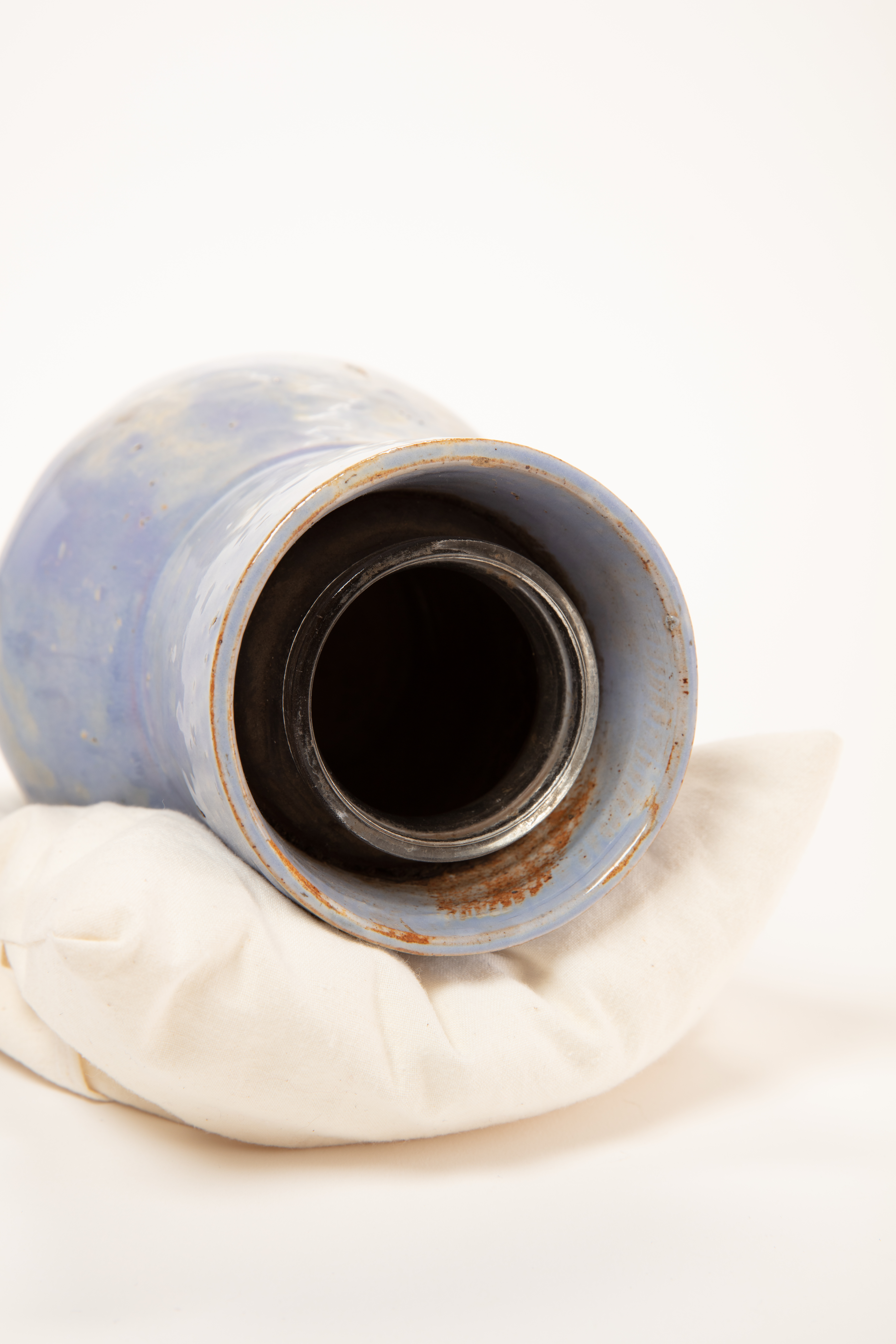
Interior with Jam Jar, Auckland War Memorial Museum

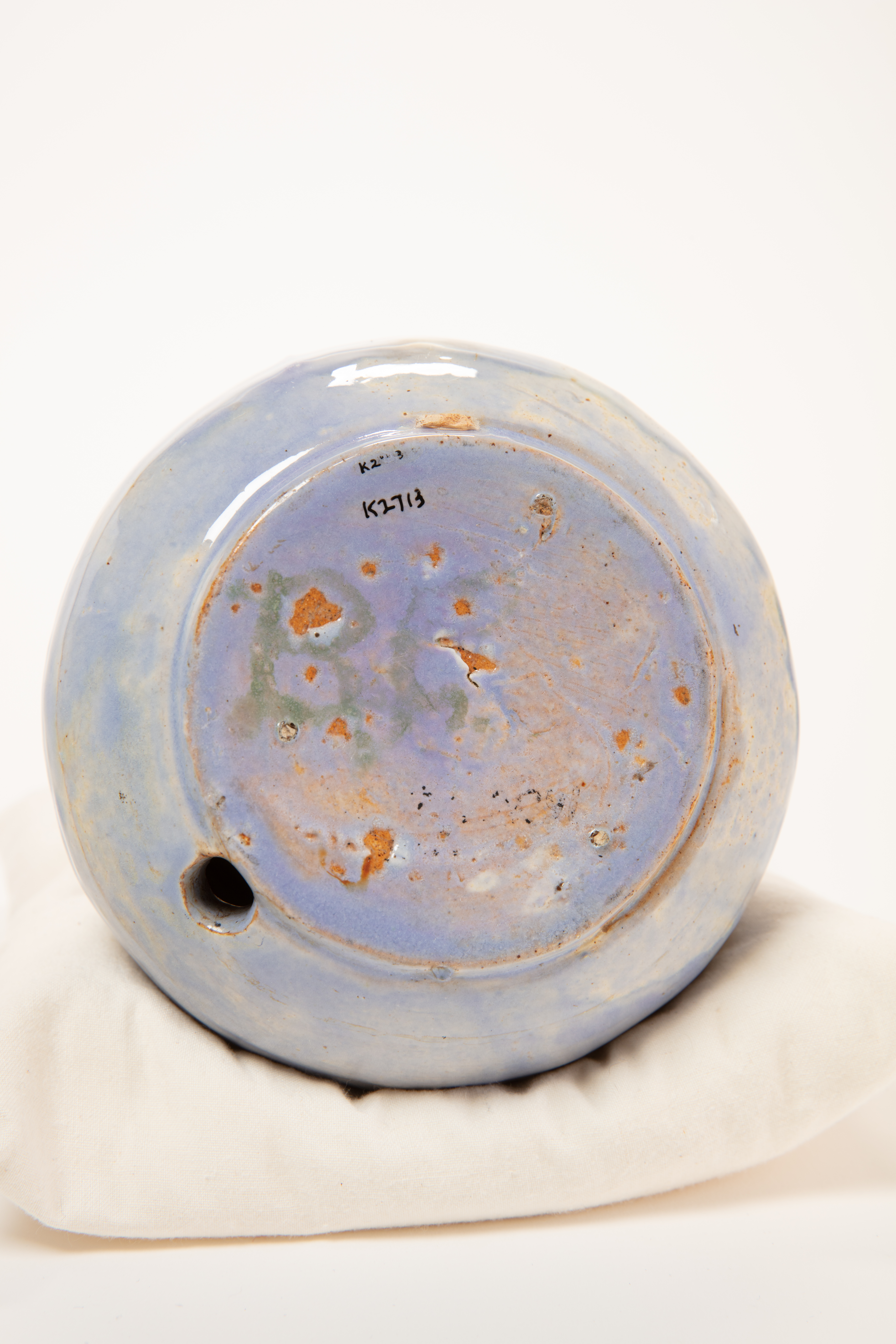
B.G. Signature Auckland War Memorial Museum

=== Māori design use ===
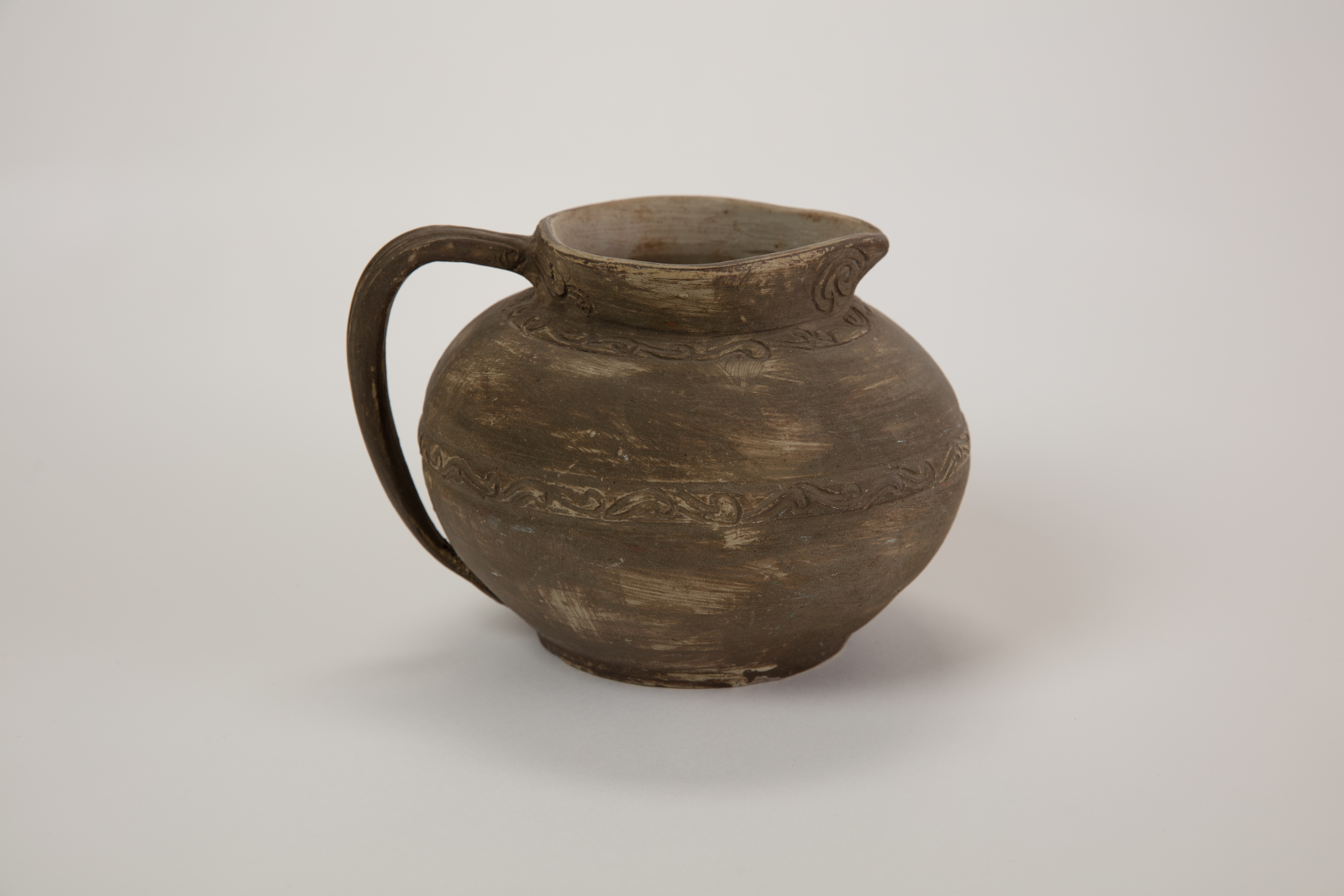
Jug with Incised Abstracted Māori Designs by Briar Gardner (1940), Auckland War Memorial Museum

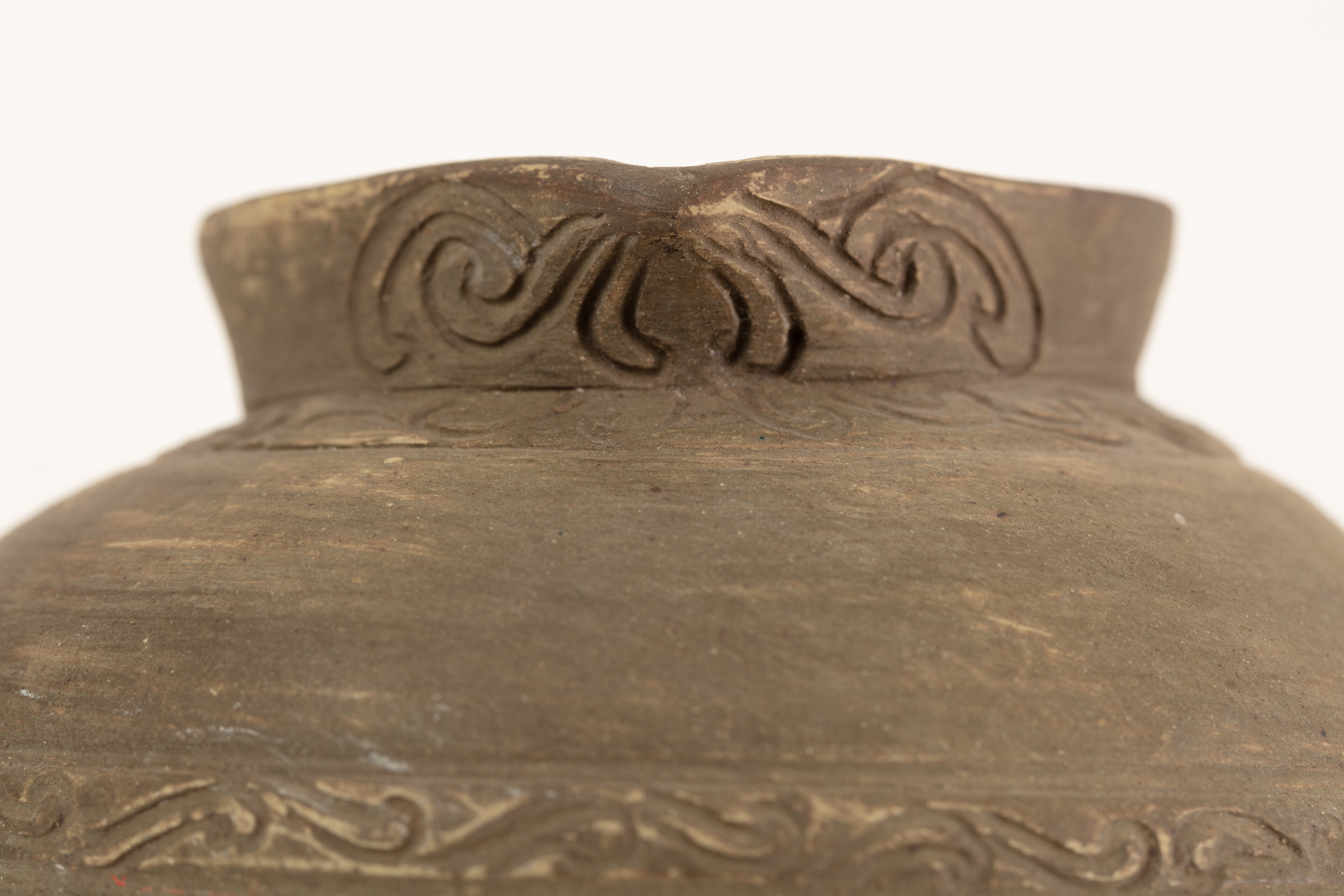
Close-Up of Incised Abstracted Māori Designs (1940), Auckland War Memorial Museum

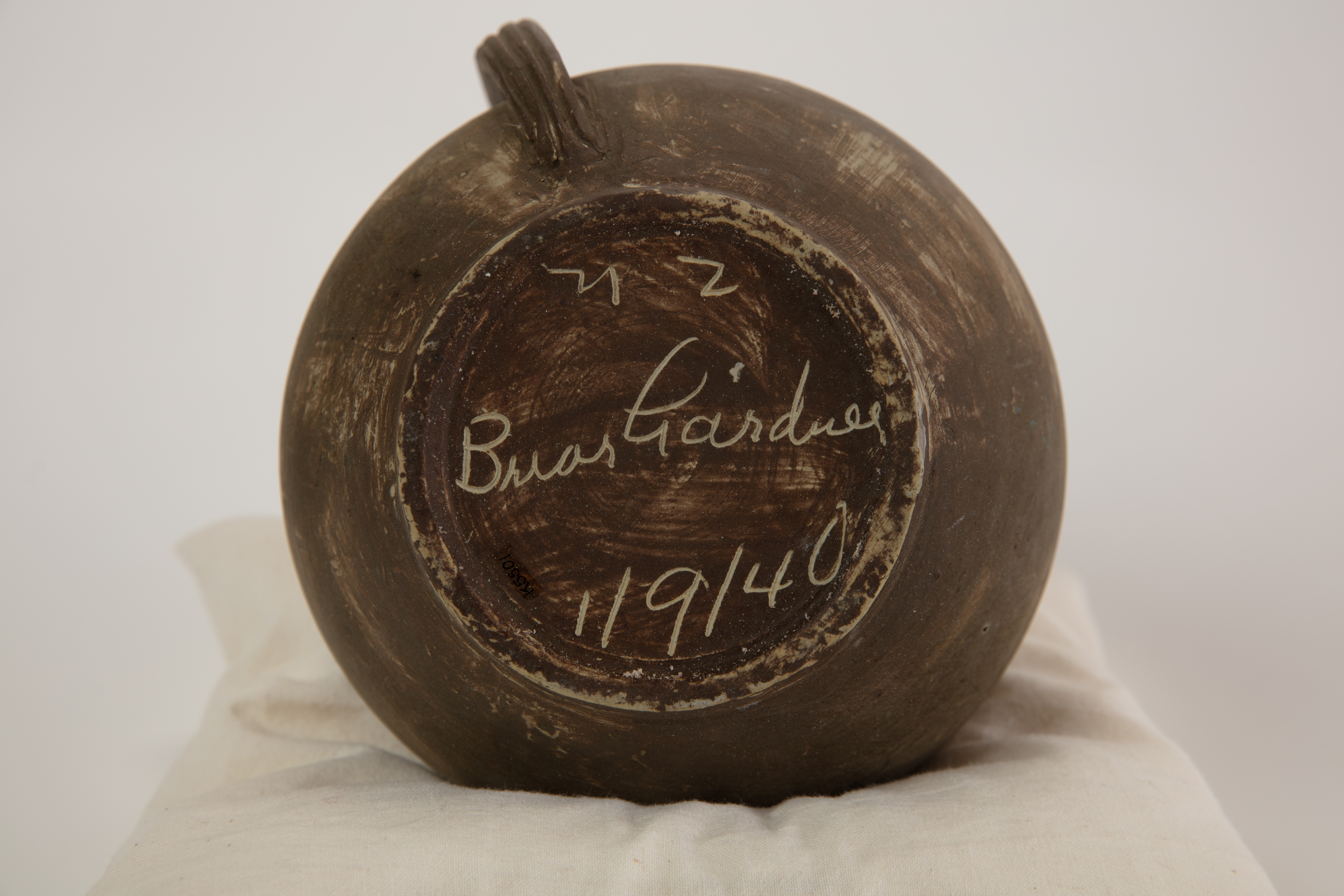
Base View with Maker's Mark Jug (Briar Gardner, 1/9/40), Auckland War Memorial Museum

== Later life ==
By 1950, arthritis forced her to stop pottery, and in 1951 she trained as a speech and drama teacher. She died in Auckland on 20 October 1968.

== Collections ==
Gardner's work is held in the collections of the Auckland War Memorial Museum, Museum of New Zealand Te Papa Tongarewa, and Te Toi Uku – Crown Lynn & Clayworks Museum.
