= Jean Horsley =

New Zealand artist

Jean Horsley OBE
- Born: Jean Alice Horsley; 15 February 1913; Auckland, New Zealand
- Died: 21 August 1997 (aged 84); Auckland, New Zealand
- Education: Elam School of Fine Art; Chelsea School of Art
- Known for: Painting
- Notable work: Maori Mere
- Style: Abstract expressionism

Jean Alice Horsley OBE (15 February 1913 – 21 August 1997) was a New Zealand artist. Her work is held in the permanent collection of the Auckland City Art Gallery.

== Career ==
Horsley attended the Elam School of Fine Art at the University of Auckland, and in 1934 traveled to the United Kingdom to study at London's Chelsea School of Art.

She returned to New Zealand due to World War II and trained as a physical therapist. She continued her interest in sketching and painting, taking lessons from Colin McCahon and through summer schools.

Following the end of the war, Horsley traveled to Japan, South Africa, and the USA. She moved to London in 1961 for seven years, and then to New York, where she stayed for fifteen years. During this time she continued to paint and exhibit.

In 1981, Horsley returned to New Zealand and settled in Auckland.

Horsley's paintings are abstract in style, often working in oils or watercolor. She was influenced heavily by the work of the abstract expressionists, especially artists whose work she was exposed to while in New York, including Philip Guston, Mark Rothko, Willem de Kooning, Robert Motherwell, and Helen Frankenthaler.

Notable works by Horsley include: Maori Mere.

In the 1996 New Year Honours, Horsley was appointed an Officer of the Order of the British Empire, for services to art.

=== Exhibitions ===
Horsley exhibited regularly with the Auckland Society of the Arts between 1935 and 1938, and was included alongside M. Rainier and Freda Simmonds in the 1957 exhibition Three Women Painters. She also held a shared exhibition with Louise Henderson at the New Vision Gallery in 1966.

She exhibited with the Rutland Group, an organisation formed by students from the Elam School of Fine Art and The Group, an informal art association from Christchurch, New Zealand, formed to provide a freer alternative to the Canterbury Society of Arts. She contributed works to multiple exhibitions by The Group including in: 1955; 1957; and 1960.

During her time in England, Horsley exhibited alongside fellow expatriates Ralph Hotere, Bill Culbert, and Ted Bullmore.

In 1997 a retrospective exhibit of Horsley's work entitled, Seize the Day: A Tribute to Jean Horsley, was held at the Auckland City Art Gallery.
