= May Smith (textile designer) =

New Zealand artist, born in Simla, India (1906–1988)

May Anne Smith
- Born: 18 June 1906; Simla, India
- Died: 24 July 1988 (aged 82); Coromandel, New Zealand
- Known for: Textile design, painting, print making

May Anne Smith (18 June 1906 – 24 July 1988) was a New Zealand painter, engraver, textile designer and textile printer. Smith was part of a movement of women who were instrumental in bringing new artistic ideas to New Zealand and influencing the art of the country.

== Early life ==
May Smith was born in Simla, India, in 1906 where British India had its summer government headquarters. Smith's father was Sir Joseph Smith, a civil engineer. Smith was the eldest of three children. She went to England in her early childhood in order undergo a series of hip operations. Because the procedures included long periods of enforced inactivity, her grandmother encouraged her to use this time to learn to paint. When she was mobile again at school she received formal art training, first at a convent in Mussoorie and later at Loreto College in Simla.

== Education ==
Smith returned to New Zealand, in 1921 with her mother and two brothers where they settled in Auckland. Smith began as a student of the Diocesan School. From 1924 to 1928 she attended Elam School of Art at Auckland University College where she studied engraving before returning to England to attend the Royal College of Art in London. She became briefly involved with the Communist party during her time at the Royal College. At the college, she also associated with Jocelyn Mays (who was later to marry A. R. D. Fairburn), James Boswell, and the painter Hildegard. She graduated from the Royal College of Art in 1931 with a diploma in engraving.

== Career ==
In 1933 Smith visited Spain where she met New Zealand artist Frances Hodgkins in the town of Ibiza. Hodgkins and Smith became friends.

Smith found it difficult to obtain work as an engraver after her graduation because of the Depression. Her attempts at obtaining work in book illustration or commercial art were also unsuccessful, especially because many places "refused to hire women when so many men were unemployed." Influenced by Hodgkins, Smith focused on painting and started exhibiting her work in small galleries. "It was during the depression and no-one was interested in art or artists. I was mainly concerned with earning a living so I concentrated on textiles." She taught herself fabric designing and printing, using wood or linoleum cut blocks. She had some success selling her hand-printed fabric to boutique stores such as Peter Jones and Heal and Sons but did no repeat business.

With the outbreak of World War II, Smith returned to New Zealand in 1939 and painting again became her priority. She was a part of the "Auckland Intelligentsia," a group of artists, writers and poets with "socialist leanings." As a member of these political discussions, Smith was considered a "quiet leader" who was good at redirecting poorly thought out ideas.

During this time she began to be recognized for her paintings. At the 1940 Auckland Society of Arts Show, Smith exhibited some of the paintings that she'd brought back with her. With their original sense of design and structure, and their daring use of colour, they aroused both shock and admiration. However the shortage of fabrics caused her to return to fabric printing. She became a member of was a member of the Auckland Society of Arts and worked on commissioned fabric prints and murals.

In 1944 she married Philip Hardcastle, a trades union official. In 1945, Smith was the topic of an article in The Arts in New Zealand by R.P. Anschutz. In 1950, Smith and her husband moved to Gisborne, where they set up work as commercial fabric printers. In 1952 their marriage was dissolved and Smith returned to Auckland. Smith taught part-time at the Auckland Teachers Training College in the 1950s before teaching art full-time at the Epsom Girls' Grammar School and illustrating for the School Journal.

She continued to exhibit her hand-printed fabrics in group shows with the artist A. R. D. Fairburn and her work sold in a number of Auckland and Wellington shops including the Helen Hitchings Gallery. Smith eventually became disillusioned with textile design, feeling that it wasn't possible to compete with mass-produced fabrics, but she continued to incorporate textile design into her work. She also introduced her students, among them Robin White, to the possibilities of screenprinting.

She retired from the art department at Epsom Girls' Grammar School in 1965 and in 1967 moved permanently to the Coromandel. In 1974 she married John Fowler who was very helpful and supportive of her art, creating an "ideal environment for a painter to work in" for her. She continued to paint and exhibit regularly in Thames, Hamilton, Coromandel, Auckland and Dunedin up until the early 1980s. May Smith died in 1988.

== List of works ==
- Works in the collection of the Museum of New Zealand Te Papa Tongarewa
- Works in the collection of Auckland War Memorial Museum
