= Elam School of Fine Arts =

Art school at the University of Auckland

Coordinates: 36.855469°S 174.767922°E

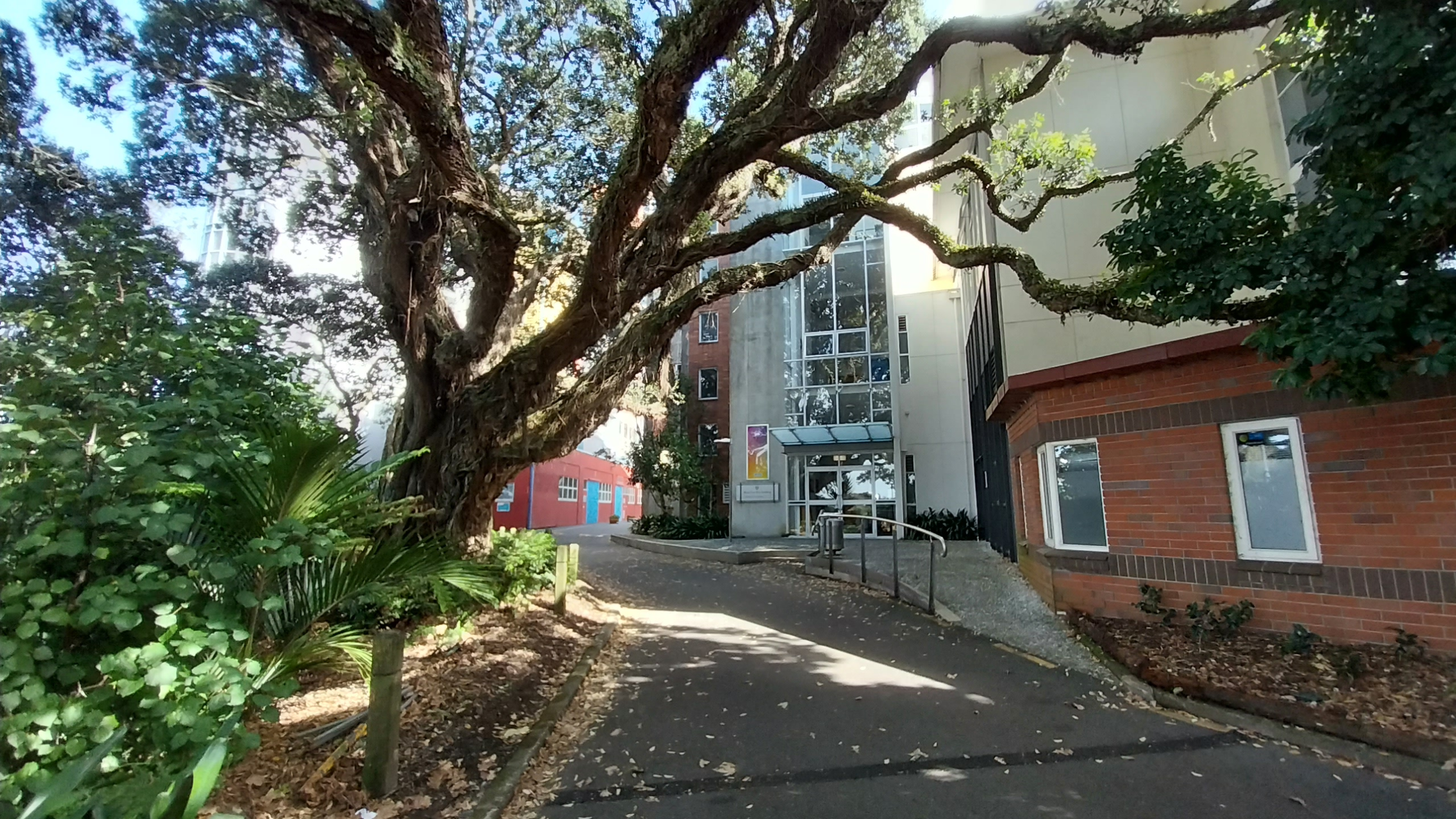
- Active: 1890–2026
- Founder: John Edward Elam
- Parent institution: Faculty of Arts and Education, University of Auckland
- Head: Fiona Jack
- Location: Auckland, New Zealand

The Elam School of Fine Arts, founded by John Edward Elam, was a former art school that was incorporated into the University of Auckland in 1950. In January 2026, it was dissolved and merged into the University of Auckland Faculty of Arts and Education's School of Creative Arts. It offered the first Bachelor of Fine Arts programme in New Zealand starting in 1967. Students study degrees in fine art, across three buildings, the Mondrian building, Building 431 (or the "Main" fine arts building), and Elam B, which includes the studios for postgraduate and doctoral students on Princes Street, in central Auckland, New Zealand.

== History ==
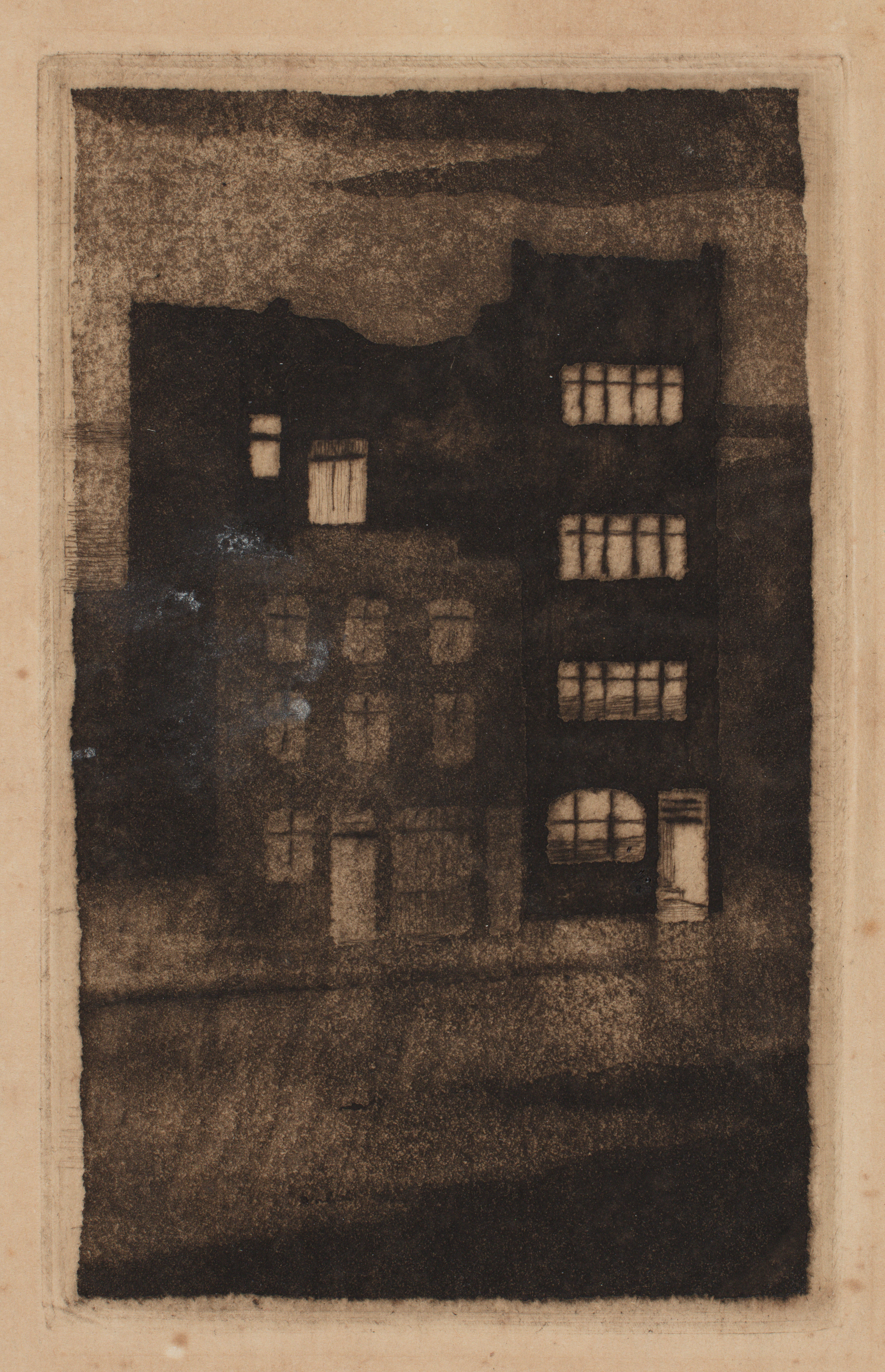
Watercolour by Edward William Payton of the Rutland Street campus

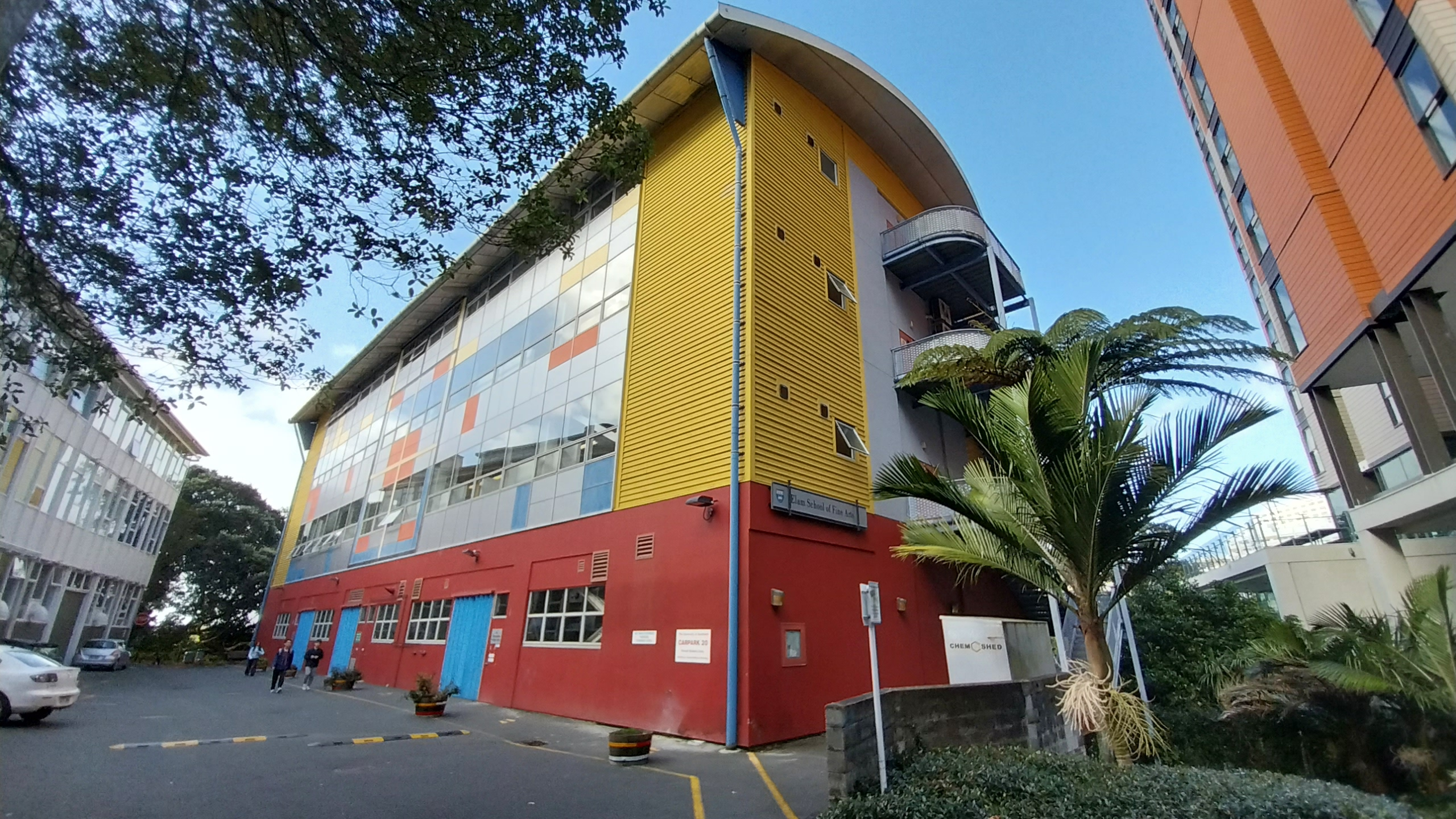
Mondrian Building

The school was founded from a bequest on the death of Dr. John Edward Elam in 1888 of ten thousand pounds. His will stated 'in the selection or admission of pupils those shall be preferred who, from poverty or circumstances, are unable at their own charge to obtain for themselves the advantages furnished by the school.' Edward William Payton was the first director, retiring in 1924 after 35 years. It opened in 1890 and for the first 60 years ran full and part-time instruction in art to both adults and children.

The first premises of the school was in 'rooms located under the bell tower of what is now the Auckland City Art Gallery'. (History - Elam School of Arts)

Archie Fisher was appointed principal in 1924 and was instrumental in the school's inclusion within the University of Auckland in 1950. A fire in 1949, which destroyed the school and library, was the catalyst, as well as the loss of pre-1950 administrative records, that resulted in joining with the University.

The Bachelor of Fine Arts programme was established in 1967 and was the first fine arts bachelor degree in the country. (History - Elam School of Arts)

In 1994 the George Fraser Gallery started to be administered by Elam School of Fine Arts, and it is mainly an exhibition space for their students. The gallery was before managed by the Sargeson Trust, named after Frank Sargeson. It is located in the downstairs premises of a historic stables in Princes St, Auckland.

The Fine Arts Library housed New Zealand's largest collection of specialist monographs, and had an extensive collection of art books, which is believed to be the largest in New Zealand. In 2018 students and staff protested at Auckland University's Fine Arts Library as its proposed closure.

On 1 January 2025, Elam School was merged into the University's new Faculty of Arts and Education. On 9 January 2026, Elam School was dissolved and merged with the School of Music and Dance Studies programme to form the "School of Creative Studies," one of the five constituent schools of the Faculty of Arts and Education.

== Notable staff and alumni ==
Notable alumni include:

- Gretchen Albrecht
- Rita Angus
- George Baloghy
- Don Binney OBE
- Louie Bretaña
- Peter Brown
- Niki Caro
- Stella Corkery
- Bessie Christie
- Noel Crombie
- Melvin Day
- Lynley Dodd
- Selina Foote
- Luise Fong
- Ian George
- May Gilbert
- Ayesha Green
- Peter Haythornthwaite ONZM
- Jean Horsley
- Bridie Lonie
- Kees Meeuws
- Ellen von Meyern
- Jan Nigro
- Michael Parekowhai
- Reuben Paterson
- Ian Scott
- Vida Steinert
- Chad Taylor (writer)
- Ray Thorburn
- Alice Maria Warren
- Lois White
- Natalie Couch
- Ruban Nielson
- Paul Eagle

Notable staff include:

- Paul Beadle, Professor and Dean of Fine Arts, 1961–1976
- Michael Dunn (art historian), Professor and Dean of Fine Arts, 1994–2006.
- Robert Ellis ONZM
- Arnold Goodwin, Director of Design and Applied Art
- Luise Fong, lecturer in painting from 2001 to 2005
- John Francis Kavanagh
- Peter Haythornthwaite ONZM
- John Weeks
