= Charles Rose (artist) =

New Zealand artist (1921–2017)

Charles Rose (7 May 1921 – 16 July 2017) was a New Zealand artist.

== Early life in London ==
Rose was born in the front parlour of his family home in Falconer Walk in Finsbury Park in London on 7 May 1921. He had a working-class upbringing in a family of four brothers and five sisters, raised by Louise Rose (nee Richard), crowded into a house with only two bedrooms. Rose began his working life in London as an architectural draughtsman.

== Military career ==
In 1942, during World War II, Rose was called up for military service and joined the Royal Ordinance Corps in the British Army. He was sent to Egypt as part of the 13th Corps, 8th Army. Rose served on the front lines in the Second Battle of El Alamein and later spent time in Lebanon before landing with the Allied Forces in Italy. He narrowly escaped capture crossing the Sangro River. Demobilised in 1945, Rose returned to London.

== New Zealand, art school and further education ==
Rose arrived in New Zealand in 1951 and initially stayed for two years, returning to England in 1953. A few months later he was back in Auckland, arriving in early January 1954. Rose decided to commence studying at Elam School of Fine Arts at Auckland University College. He passed the preliminary examination on 31 January 1955, at the age of 34. Rose studied painting under Ida Eise but decided to major in sculpture under John Kavanagh. He graduated DipFA in 1958. After art school, Rose completed a teaching diploma at Auckland Teachers' College. He then taught at Otahuhu College in Auckland and at Colenso College in Napier.

== Art career ==
Rose became a working member of the Auckland Society of Arts in the late 1950s and began to make a name for himself with a series of art exhibitions from 1963. He exhibited with the New Zealand Academy of Fine Arts from 1962 to 1966, the John Leech Gallery, the Denis Cohn Gallery, Whitecliffe Galleries, the New Vision Gallery and the Kitchener Gallery.

Rose was a member of the short-lived Auckland group of artists known as 'The Group' which included Russell Hollings, John Horner, Dorothy Milne, Margot Mountain, Elise Mourant and Peggy Spicer. His work was included in their show in September 1974.

Rose subsequently became a freelance artist known for his figurative, landscape and still life paintings, and he also carried out architectural work and the restoration of paintings. He was an Auckland Society of Arts' tutor in the 1970s and 1980s.

Rose and his work were included in Re-reading the Rainbow, a survey of LGBTQI artists in New Zealand that was published in 2017. Ron Brownson, in a public lecture after Rose's death, described Rose as "a gay visionary, who had a self-belief, trust in his own talent, painting the figure which mirrored his obsessions and passions".

== Personal life and death ==
During World War II, Rose was in a relationship with Alf Rothery that lasted the duration of the War. In 1968, Rose met his long-term partner Peter Brown and they lived together at various times in central Auckland, Helensville, Laingholm, and on Waiheke Island, until Rose's death on 16 July 2017.

== Selected exhibitions ==
- Waiheke Paintings, John Leech Gallery, 1966.
- Human Form, John Leech Gallery, 1972.
- THE GROUP 74, Auckland Society of Arts, 1974.
- The New Zealand Nude, Denis Cohn Gallery, 1979.
- The Gentle Nude, Whitecliffe Galleries, 1981.
- Figure Paintings, New Vision Gallery, 1984.
- Flowers and Figures, Pacific Gallery, 1986.
- Still Life Paintings by Charles Rose, Corban Estate Art Centre, 2005.
- Group Show, Northart, 2015.

== Sources ==
- Brownson, Ron (2017). Ron Brownson speaks on Charles Rose - a visionary gay artist. Blikfang Gallery, Northcote, Auckland: Blikfang Event - Artweek.
- Coutts, Brent; Hajian, Georges (2023). Charlie Rose & Peter Brown: The gay artist and his lover. Auckland, New Zealand: Queer Art Narratives. ISBN 978-0-473-67114-3.
- Coutts, Brent (2017). Inclusion / Exclusion in Brent Coutts, Steve Lovett, Richard Orjis and Luisa Tora (Editor: Pepper Burns), Re-reading the Rainbow. Auckland, New Zealand: INKubator. ISBN 978-0-473-38484-5.
- Kay, Robin; Eden, Tony (1983). Portrait of a Century. The History of the N.Z. Academy of Fine Arts 1882-1982. Wellington, New Zealand: Millward Press Ltd. ISBN 0-908582-60-9.
- Thwaites, Ian; Fletcher, Rie (2004). We Learnt to See: Elam's Rutland Group 1935-1958. Puriri Press. ISBN 0-908943-27-X.
