= Rena Frances Manson =

New Zealand artist (1914–2013)

Rena Frances Manson (née Brodie) (August 1914 – 8 October 2013) was a New Zealand artist.

Manson was born in Hāwera, Taranaki, in August 1914. She was the daughter of Frank and Hilda (Pearl) Brodie, and granddaughter of Captain Francis (Frank) Brodie (1837–1916), and Rowena Brodie, née Williams (1855–1936). Manson's father was a bank manager, first in Hokitika, then Ashburton. The Brodie family left Ashburton in 1930, and moved to Auckland.

Manson studied at the Elam School of Fine Arts where her lecturers included John Weeks and Lois White. Manson joined the army during WWII, and served in the New Zealand Women's Army Auxiliary Corps (NZWAAC). After the war, she continued to live with her father until his death in the late 1960s. In 1972, aged about 58, she married Jack Manson, also an artist, but then was widowed in the same year. Manson moved to Remuera, close to where her grandparents had lived.

Manson exhibited with groups such as the Auckland Society of Arts and the NZ Fellowship of Artists. She painted familiar scenes with bright colours. An archive of her scrapbooks and ephemera is held in the Auckland Art Gallery's archive. The collection features many activities of the Auckland Society of Arts and various Auckland painting groups including The Tuesday Group, and the St Heliers Art Group. Her collecting of news clippings also followed the careers of her artists friends and mentors, including Ida Eise, Peggy Spicer and Bessie Christie.

Manson died in 2013, aged 99.
