= Pauline Yearbury =

New Zealand artist

Pauline Kahurangi Yearbury
- Born: Pauline Kahurangi Blomfield; 31 December 1928; Matauri Bay, Northland, New Zealand
- Died: May 27, 1977 (aged 48)
- Occupation: Artist
- Known for: Māori modernist art
- Spouse: Jim Yearbury

Pauline Kahurangi Yearbury (née Blomfield; 31 December 1928 – 27 May 1977) was a New Zealand artist. She is considered a leading practitioner in Māori modernist art, and her work is held by the Whangarei Museum, Auckland Art Gallery Toi o Tāmaki and Russell Museum.

== Biography ==
=== Early life and education ===
Yearbury was born in 1926 in Matauri Bay, Northland, New Zealand to Valentine Blomfield and Waiatua Hikuwai Ihaia. She went to school in Russell and in 1943 moved to Auckland to attend Elam School of Fine Arts.She was one of the first two Māori women who studied at the school; graduating in 1946, she became the first Māori person to receive a fine arts degree. Among other subjects, she learnt painting with John Weeks and mural design with Archie Fisher, the head of the school. Two years after being accepted to the school, she taught there as a tutor.

Early influence to Yearbury's drawings were Elam School of Fine Arts teacher Lois White and Director Archibald Joseph Charles, whose skills were grounded in crisp lines and gradual shading. During art school Yearbury joined a collective of Elam School of Fine Arts graduates and teachers called the New Group. The New Group had a shared belief in 'a visual approach to their subjects', favouring representation over abstraction'. Members of the New Group included but not limited to Ida Eise, Selwyn Te Ngareatua Wilson, James Turkington, and May Smith.

=== After Education ===
In 1951 Yearbury moved back to Russell and worked creating murals and signs and tutoring in art. One of her largest murals was created in collaboration with her husband Jim - a nine-metre-long depiction of the signing of the Treaty of Waitangi for Waitangi Hotel in 1964. From 1966 to 1977 the couple also ran an art studio in the town, which displayed and sold the couple's wood panels of legendary Māori figures – these were designed by Yearbury and incised and coloured by her husband.

==== The Children of Rangi and Papa: The Māori Story of Creation ====
In 1976 Yearbury published The Children of Rangi and Papa: The Maori Creation Story, an illustrated book including a reproduced series of her gouache paintings telling the Māori story of creation. The publication was made possible by a grant from the Māori Purposes Fund Board. The text was based on a 1956 revision of Sir George Grey's book Polynesian Mythology, and the foreword was written by Member of Parliament Whetu Tirikatene-Sullivan. Yearbury's illustrations intended to "create a bridge between the European style of realism and the traditional Māori carving".

Within the book, Yearbury credits Māori educator and community leader Maitu Te Hau as well as Māori Labour Party membersWhetu Tirikatene-Sullivan & Matiu Rata for their assistance.

==== Further Work ====
Yearbury's work was part of the First Māori Festival of the Arts held in 1963 at Ngāruawāhia, and was also part of the exhibition New Zealand Māori Culture and the Contemporary Scene held at Canterbury Museum in 1966 curated by Buck Nin; this exhibition was the first major exhibition of Māori art in a significant museum in New Zealand. The Department of External Affairs later funded the exhibition to tour to Sydney, Apia, Singapore, Kuala Lumpur, Hong Kong and Tokyo.

Names Of Work (Incomplete)
Year	Name of Work	Medium	Creator(s)
1976	Hine Mahuru	incised wood panel, dyed stain	Pauline Kahurangi Yearbury, James Yearbury
1976	Tawhirimatea	incised wood panel, dyed stain	Pauline Kahurangi Yearbury, James Yearbury
unknown	Haka	incised wood on panel	Pauline Kahurangi Yearbury, James Yearbury
unknown	Maori Madonna and Child	incised wood panel	Pauline Kahurangi Yearbury
unknown	Tane-Mahuta	incised wood panel	Pauline Kahurangi Yearbury

==== End of Life ====
In 1977, one year after The Children of Rangi and Papa was published Pauline Yearbury passed away at age 50.

=== Legacy ===
In 2014, her painting Papatuanuku and Ranginui was featured on a New Zealand Post postage stamp.

=== Personal life ===
Yearbury married Jim Yearbury in the late 1940s, a fellow student at Elam School of Fine Arts. She was of the Ngāpuhi iwi.

In The Children of Rangi and Papa: The Maori Creation Story Yearbury thanks her mother in the dedication; 'For my mother, Waiatua Hikuwai Ihaia Bloomfield, "from whence I am", as well as her husband Jim by stating "with whom, I am...".
