= Mary Spicer =

Mary Spicer may refer to:

- Peggy Spicer, full name Mary Margaret Gore Spicer, (1908 – 1984), New Zealand artist.
- Nellie Spicer, full name Mary Nelson Spicer, (born 1987), American indoor volleyball player.
