= Auckland Society of Arts =

- Formation: 1870
- Dissolved: 2004; 22 years ago
- Legal status: Artist society
- Headquarters: Auckland, New Zealand
- Formerly called: The Society of Artists

The Auckland Society of Arts was a community organisation that brought together over 2000 local and national artists in Auckland, New Zealand between 1870 and 1984. It was the first community art society in New Zealand and one of the first within Australasia. The group was originally known as the Society of Artists, Auckland, and exhibiting artists produced work for their annual exhibitions that begun in 1881. The average year saw them producing 14 exhibitions total, four as a group, eight solo, and two with unique themes. The society was officially wound up in 2004.

== History ==
The criteria for what the Auckland Society of Arts wished to exhibit included various disciplines within "fine and applied art." These details were clearly outlined in their early meeting on 31st August, 1880.

For their 31st annual exhibition in 1912, records show the gallery located in Coburg Street. The building had been designed and proposed with the involvement of Messrs Goldsbro and Wade (architects) and Mr J J Holland (builder) by at least 1905, with the proposed cost at the time being £2500. Mr Mackechnie, art enthusiast and heavily associated with the society's founding, left £2500 for the purpose of a maintaining the function of the gallery in his will. Subsequently, through a mixture of members' fees and governmental assistance the council paid £900 in land fees.

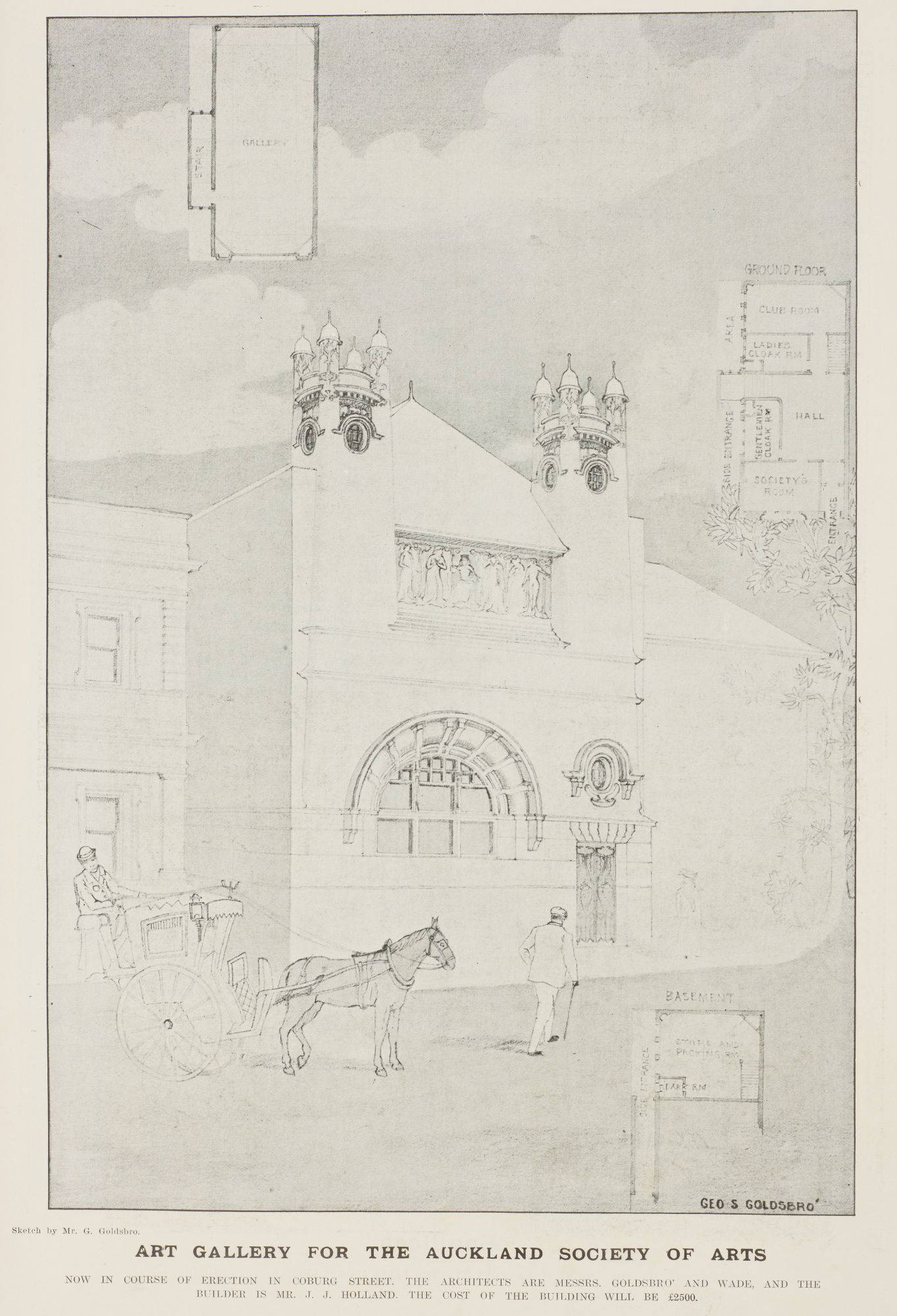
Sketch of Coburg Street, Auckland Society of Arts Gallery

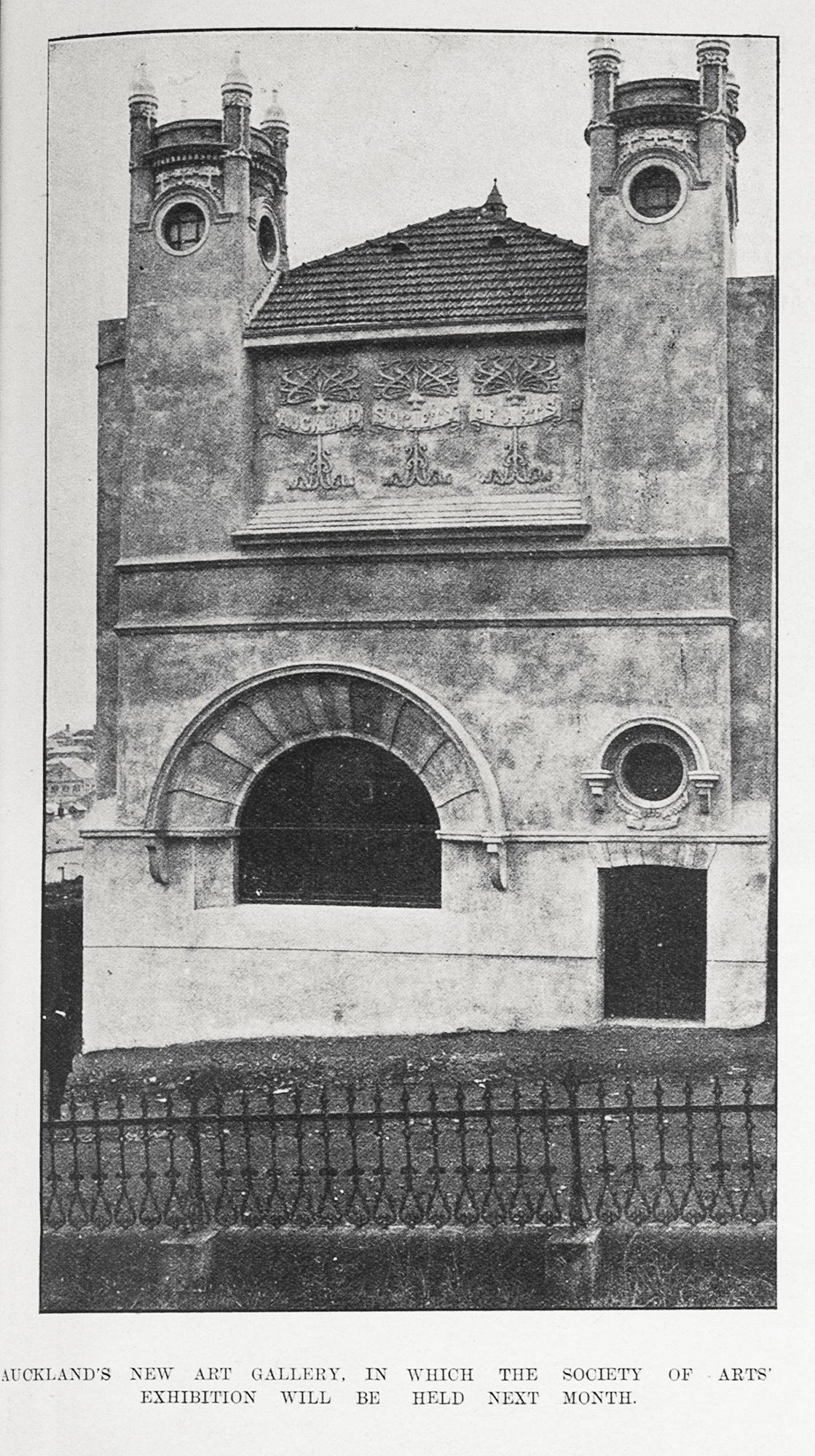
Auckland Society of Arts Gallery, Coburg Street Exterior.

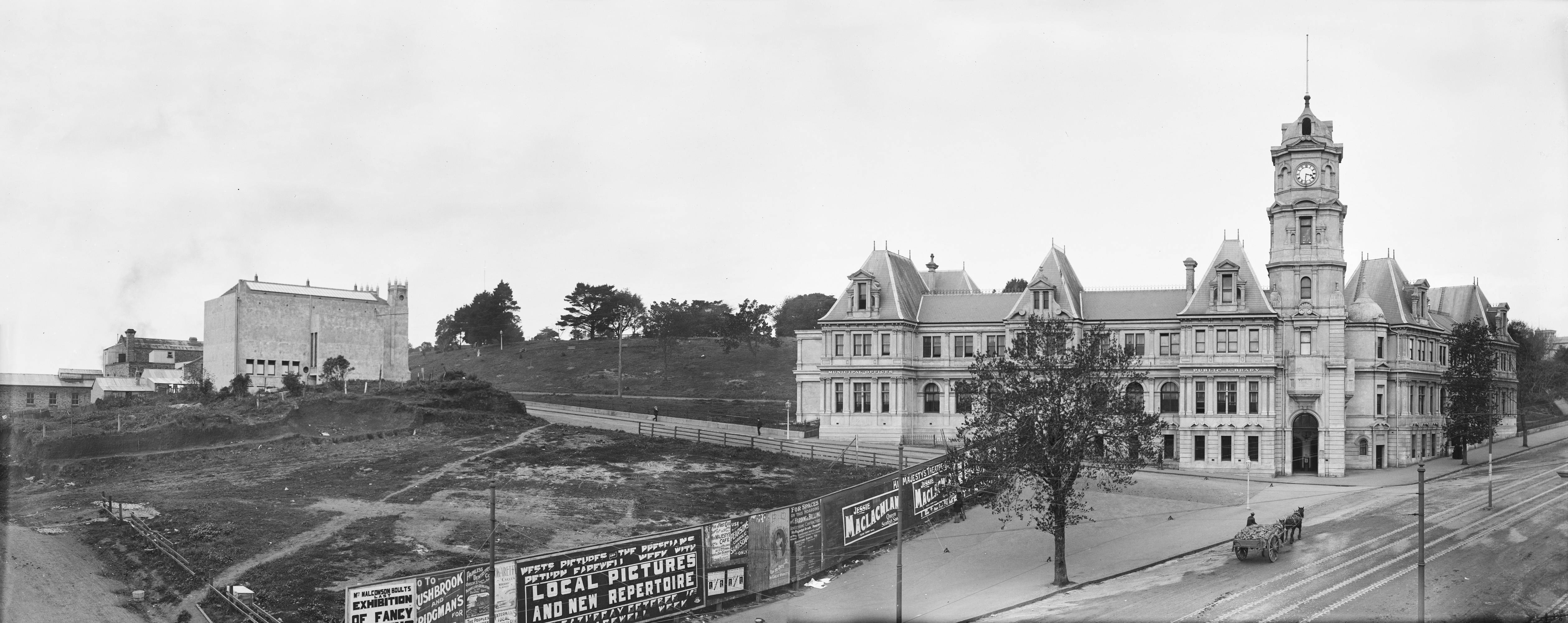
Auckland Public Library and Art Gallery, 1905

Their exhibitions later took place at 4 Eden Crescent, Auckland with solo exhibitions taking place at the Eden Terrace galleries. The building itself was made from kauri in 1898 on the original grounds of 'Bishop Selwyn's School and Home for Ministers' and consisted of two storeys with 600 ft of exhibition areas.

The first meeting of the society consisted of only sixteen people in Mr. Henry Partington's office in Queen Street, Auckland, with soon to be members like Mr James Barber and William Eastwood both present. As a result of this meeting, all in attendance became the first official members of the society, and seven formed the committee. Together they worked towards their first exhibition in March 1871. As a result of a meeting on 31st August, 1880, the society introduced their new title as the Auckland Society of Arts, and members were designated as either "working" or "honorary."

By 1951 the society had started exhibiting annually as part of the Auckland Arts Festival. Later in 1952 this was housed and presented by Auckland Art Gallery as part of the same festival.

=== First committee ===
- Chairman – James Baber
- Secretary – John Symons
- Members – Edward Bartley, William Eastwood, I. S. Hall, Thomas Warner, Frederick William Wright
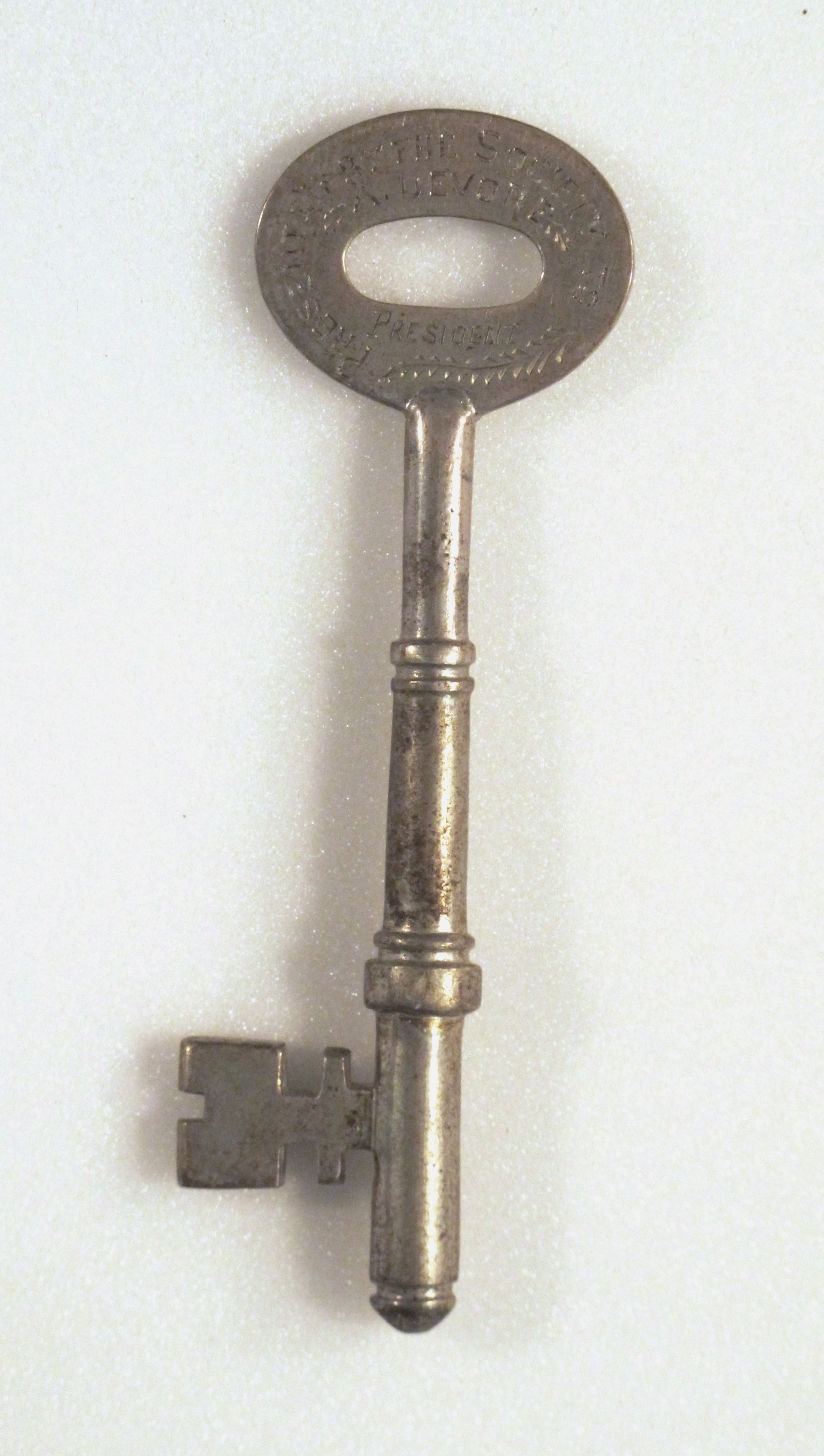
  Back of a commemorative key given to A. Devore, President of the Auckland Society of the Arts. Commemorative Key, Auckland Society of Arts, 1905, Auckland War Memorial Museum Tāmaki Paenga Hira. 1999x2.154 (temporary accession number). © Auckland Museum CC BY. https://www.aucklandmuseum.com/discover/collections/record/605829?f=object_assoc_person_id:37703#gallery

=== Membership process ===
As the national currency and economic status of New Zealand changed over time the society's membership process remained relatively consistent in principle. An example of this is the annual subscription for members from 1959 which included the following fees and privileges:

Fee for Honorary membership: Two guineas

Fee for Working Members: One and one half guinea

'Membership privileges were listed as:

- Exhibition Galleries and Club Rooms near city centre
- Library of latest art journals and books
- Picture hire service
- Private view invitations to exhibitions
- Lecture and film evenings and popular luncheon talks
- Art Studio facilities
- For working members - an opportunity to exhibit work
- For honorary members, participation in an Art Union to the extent of 10/ - on a full year's subscription.'

=== Society spaces and events ===
The following spaces and events were included in the society's membership brochure potentially dating to the 1960s.

The society offered two exhibition spaces for artists to use that were monitored by the receptionist during opening hours. Work in galleries could be viewed daily by the public of Auckland. Exhibition opening events were also offered due to the addition of a kitchen. The studio space for artists with memberships was located in the basement and was complete with an etching press, different storage methods like lockers, and toilets.

Multiple lectures on various art historical or art topics took place. Members could attend lots of group events with some of these being centred around film. More regular group gatherings included "life groups" and a group who painted landscapes together resulting in an exhibition and a "one week summer painting holiday" elsewhere.

The clubroom was advertised as one of collaboration in close proximity to Auckland's city centre. Artists and customers could converse with one another. The space was inclusive with light refreshments and a library of art books and zines to browse. The picture library involved a loaning system controlled by a monthly cost which allowed the public to borrow works for personal use. Customers could then buy the work they loaned if they wished to.

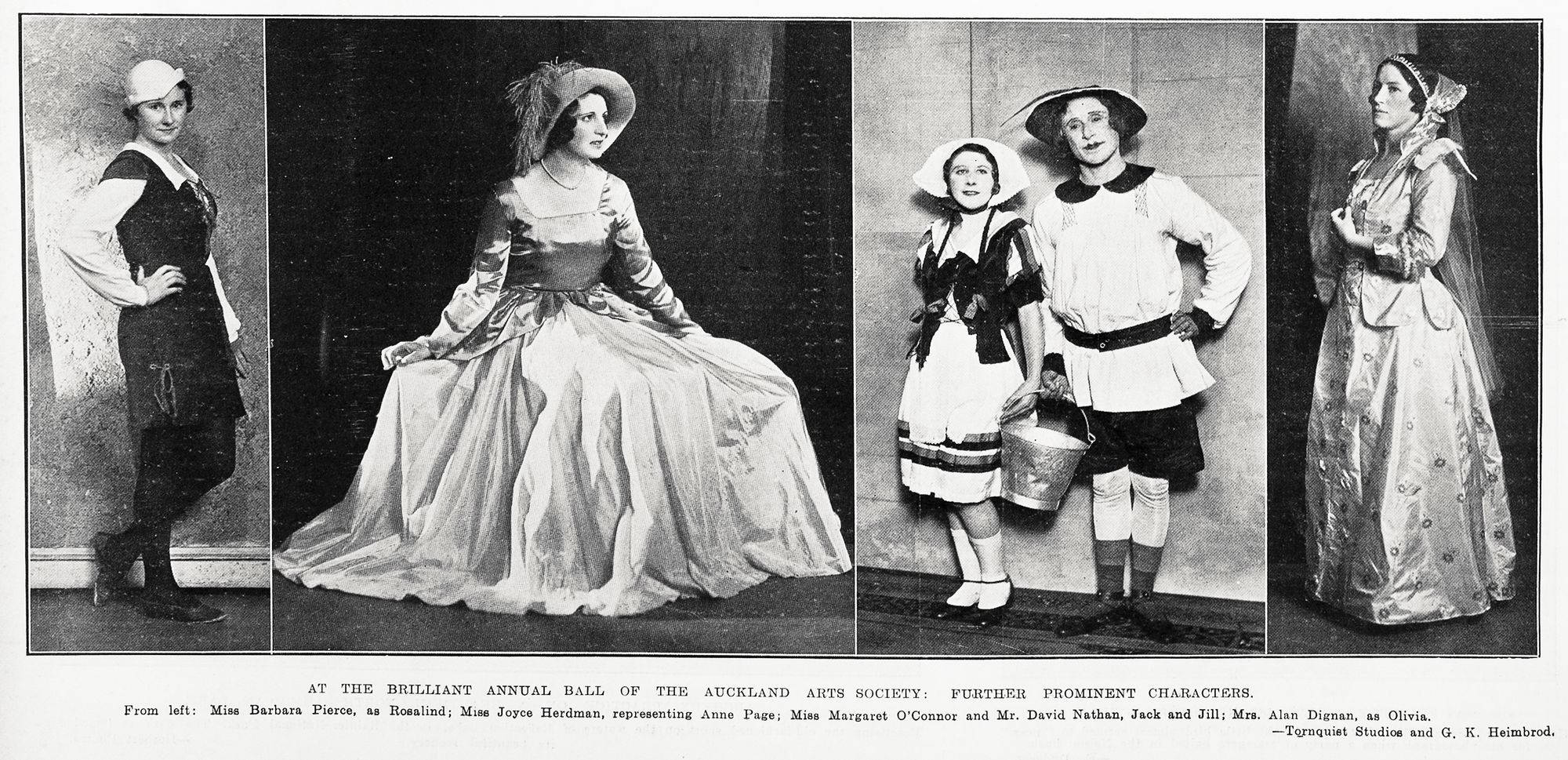
Auckland Society of Arts Ball 1932

The society held Arts balls periodically where members could gather and socialise. For example, the Peter Pan cabaret ball occurred on the 20th June 1951 at Lewis Easy Ltd on behalf of Dr and Mrs Gilbert Archey. The grand parade took place at 9:30pm. Tickets were £1.10 per person and monetary prizes were given for the following dress categories: Lady's costume (ten guineas), Gentleman's costume (ten guineas), Most original costume (ten guineas), Best couple (seven guineas), Best group (twelve guineas). The ball committee at the time consisted of Mrs Pascoe Redwood, Mrs L. Henderson, Mrs A. J. C. Fisher, Mrs C. Tucker, Mrs H. Parkinson, Mrs E. B. Readman, Mrs T. Bond, Miss Margaret Lumsden, "Marina", Phil Shone, Don Lever, Barton Gillespie. Alongside the committee James Turkington and Ron Stenberg assisted in the organisation of the event.

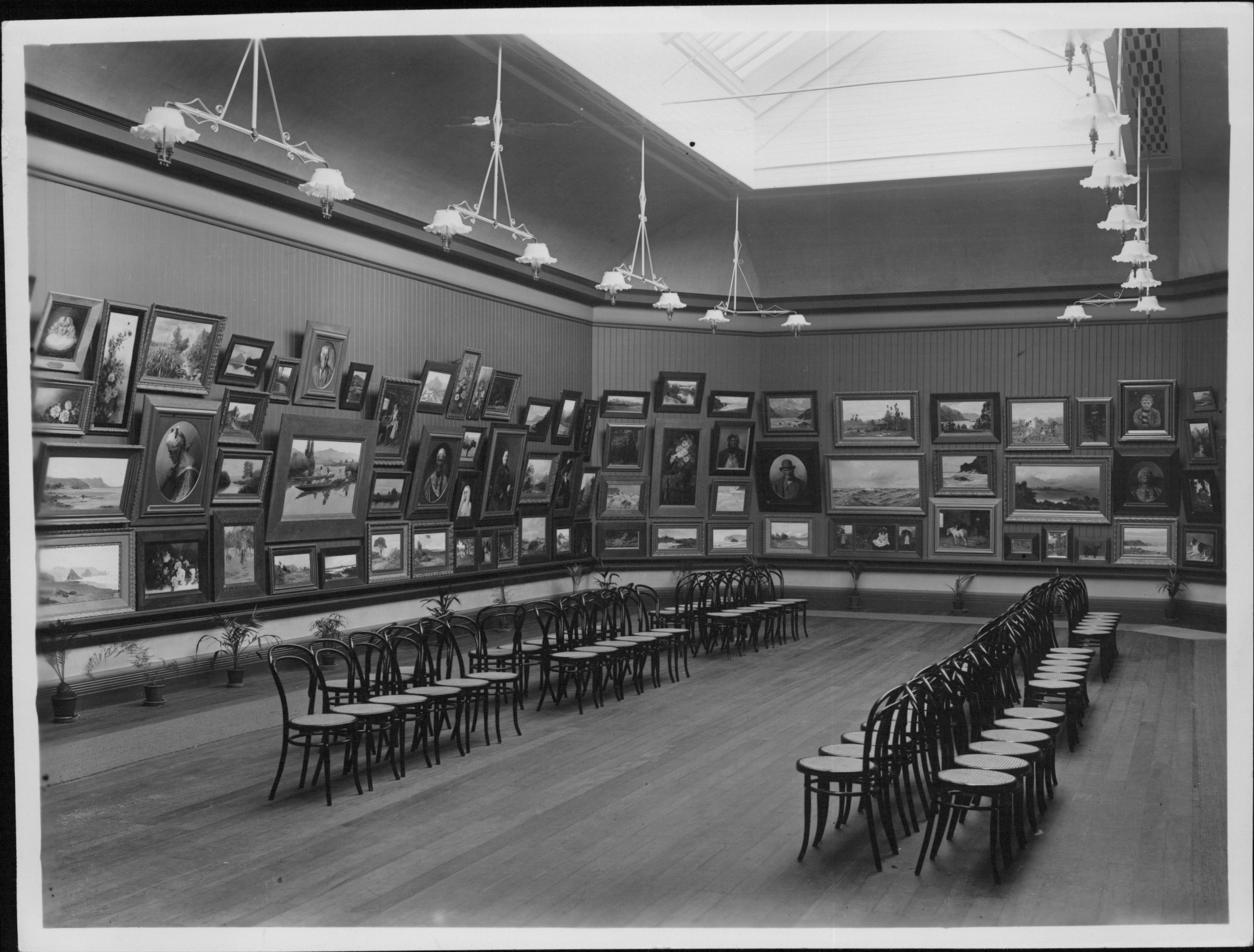
An interior view of the Kitchener Street exhibition space

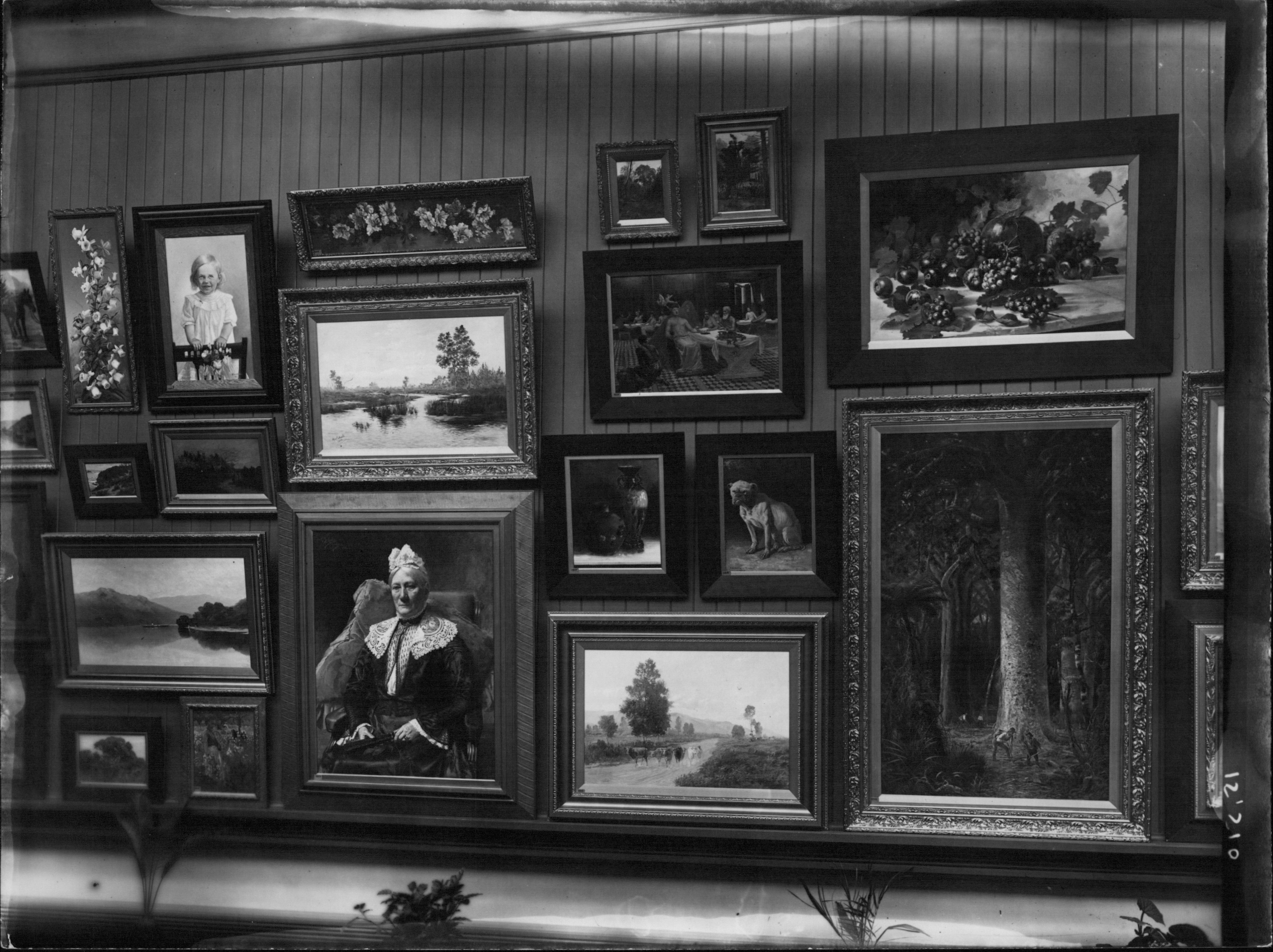
Close-up of artworks in Kitchener Street Gallery

== Committee politics ==
On 6 September 1880 a comment on the first committee of the society was made in the New Zealand Herald by an anonymous reviewer. From their perspective issues with management and communication to members occurred before the first committee's resignation, as well as an alleged focus on economic gain as opposed to building community. Later that month the new working committee held their second meeting where the general rules were conversed over and established. The location for the public general meetings also changed from the Young Men's Christian Association Rooms to the Museum lecture room on Princes Street.

Another perspective suggested that the previous committee ran the Society of Artists as an exclusive society for just art, and the new society aimed to be inclusive of high art as well as more everyday art and craft forms. The society, with Mr. Neil Heath as their honorary secretary, welcomed assistance and support for this approach from wealthy households and businessmen. They received help from the Bishop, Sir G. M. O'Rorke, Judge Fenton, R. C. Barstow, the Mayor, Messrs J. M. Clark, E. K. Tyler, J. M. Dargaville, G. P. Pierce, and G. Aickin.

At their 4 October 1880 general meeting the foundations of the new society were concretised, including the official revised name, The Auckland Society of Arts. The annual rotation of president, vice-presidents, secretary, treasurer, and ten collective members was enacted through voting. The committee agreed on an inclusive and supportive aim for the society, and that members could be in honorary and pay an annual subscription of ten shillings and six dimes which gave free admission to the annual exhibitions, a share in the art union and have the ability to vote in the committee elections. Additionally members could be classified as working members and they were required to make one original artwork for showing per year and pay a yearly fee (for ladies five shillings, and for men ten shilling and six dimes).

The exhibiting artists were to participate in the annual exhibitions and this opportunity was also extended to artists living outside of Auckland who wished to put work forward for submission. Artists would benefit from the art union at each exhibition managing purchases of work as honorary members would receive a share of the profit of their work valued at their yearly fees minus five percent. Furthermore, if artists were to win prizes for their works they were obligated to spend their monetary winnings on future exhibitions or risked losing their funds.

=== 20th century ===
Political disagreements were continuous throughout the society's time and they were affected by changing government decisions which either financially supported the arts or did not. In 1954, by decision of the president of the society at the time, Mr Pascoe Redwood, the council protested to the Minister of Internal Affairs because of how the term "art union" was being used. They were upset by the phrase being coined as the same as a lottery, when they wanted art unions to remain distinct opportunities for artists to grow their careers by having the choice to submit works of art as prizes for lotteries.

Additionally in 1954 the council fought against the Post and Telegraph Department's process of choosing New Zealand stamp designs that discredited local artists. The group banded together to propose that artists be given commissioned opportunities to design the stamps. This argument faced slight disagreement from Wellington artist, Mr E. Mervyn Taylor, who stated that entries to stamp design competitions had decreased due to artists not finding the risk nor reward worthwhile. Pascoe Redwood reinforced that stamps were an international icon representing New Zealand art and therefore the matter should be considered.

=== Second committee ===
- President – John Logan Campbell
- Vice-presidents – William Cowie (Bishop of Auckland), Maurice O'Rorke, Francis Dart Fenton, Arthur Purchas, Edward King Tyler, James Clark, George Patrick Pierce, Josiah Firth, Robert Barstow, Thomas Buddle, Joseph Dargaville, Frederick Whitaker
- Members – Kate Clark, Mrs B. Ireland, Miss Carpenter, Miss Horne, Samuel Edger, Josiah Martin, Charles Blomfield, Messrs Watkin, Sharpe, Trevithick
- Treasurer – Albin Martin
- Honorary secretary – Mr N. Heath

The new committee's first exhibition took place at Choral Hall, showcasing eighty to ninety paintings of New Zealand landscapes and global castles, eighty youth watercolour pieces, and various sketches, lace designs, baskets, wax figurines, and clay models. The event was opened on 6th April 1881 at one shilling per individual entry, the offer of two shillings and six dimes for the four days and nights that it was open, or a family of three deal for five shillings. It opened between the hours of 9am and 9pm each day, and officially closed on 11th April 1881.

Recognised by the New Zealand Herald at the time, a Mr Firth was named an excellent original artist for his contributions. The exhibition was also an opportunity for eighty other works to be put on display for purchase as permitted by their owners. Many well-known international sights captured in photos and print were shown in the space, including a photo from the Ghiberti Gates in Florence, and an Albert Durer print of Melencolia. The New Zealand Herald reported the loan collection totalling eighty-three pictures, ninety-two watercolours, sixty-four oils, three illuminations, and thirty-seven pencil and crayon sketches.

By the exhibition's conclusion the sales of local artists' works totalled to 209 pounds. The New Zealand Herald reported a demand for oil paintings, Teutenberg's Nautilus shells and wax flowers. News of the exhibition's success reached the South Island and Australia. Dr. J. L. Campbell was voted in as president for the 1881-82 year with a society of almost 200 members.

=== Annual reports ===
The society's annual reports recorded many of the general and specific art trends in Auckland and New Zealand through statistics on popular and less favourable items made and sold by artists. One example in their 1880-81 Annual Report noted a positive trend in furniture and ornaments decorated with New Zealand native greenery. Therefore, it was recommended that younger members of the society without a clear artistic direction help fulfil the demand of this style through various mediums such as paper, silk, china, oils, etc. The committee further encouraged this idea with prizes and certificates of merit being made for artists who participated and exhibited the designs in the next exhibition.

== Women in the society ==
Women made significant contributions to the society as professional practising artists. 'The Ladies Committee' was also established during this time and functioned as a sub group of the larger committee. The first members included Mrs J. M. Clark, Mrs B. Ireland, Miss Carpenter, and Miss Horne, with Mrs J. M. Clark contributing artworks depicting the North Island in the first exhibition. Other noted contributors to the exhibition in newspapers includes Mrs General Stoddard and her three Italian paintings and drawings, and Mr Charles Bloomfield, a younger artist successfully conveying native scenery in oil and watercolour.

Their 1951 exhibition displayed the work of eighty six artists with over half of them being women. Some of their most prominent women artists include Ivy Margaret Copeland, a member and vice president in the 1940s-50s. Alongside all her teaching work she did a solo exhibition with the society for her paintings in 1951 inclusive of 96 original artworks. Two of her works are held in Auckland Art Gallery's collection, including The Back of beyond and Mary Chen of Singapore.

Frances Irwin Hunt was known for her painted flora and landscapes of Waikaro, Taupō, and Rotorua in "a fractured Cubist style." Peggy Spicer was a member for 48 years and best known for her successful solo exhibition 'Old Auckland' in 1968. Spicer painted many Auckland icons as well as spots in the South Island whilst also making time for to organise a weekly Auckland sketching group during the 1960s. The Fletcher Trust hold two of Spicer's works in their collection, Cement Works, Warkworth and Mōkai - Taupō Area.

== Contributions ==
The E H McCormick Research Library located at Auckland Art Gallery Toi o Tāmaki was founded on material gifted to the institution by the Auckland Society of Arts. The society gave out scholarships to New Zealand students wanting to pursue the arts, in particular for those interested in painting. One example is the Auckland Society of Arts Carnegie Travelling Scholarship which gave partial financial support to the recipient who showed significant potential in their creative practice.

Medals like these were crafted by Anton Teutenberg and occasionally awarded to winning artists:

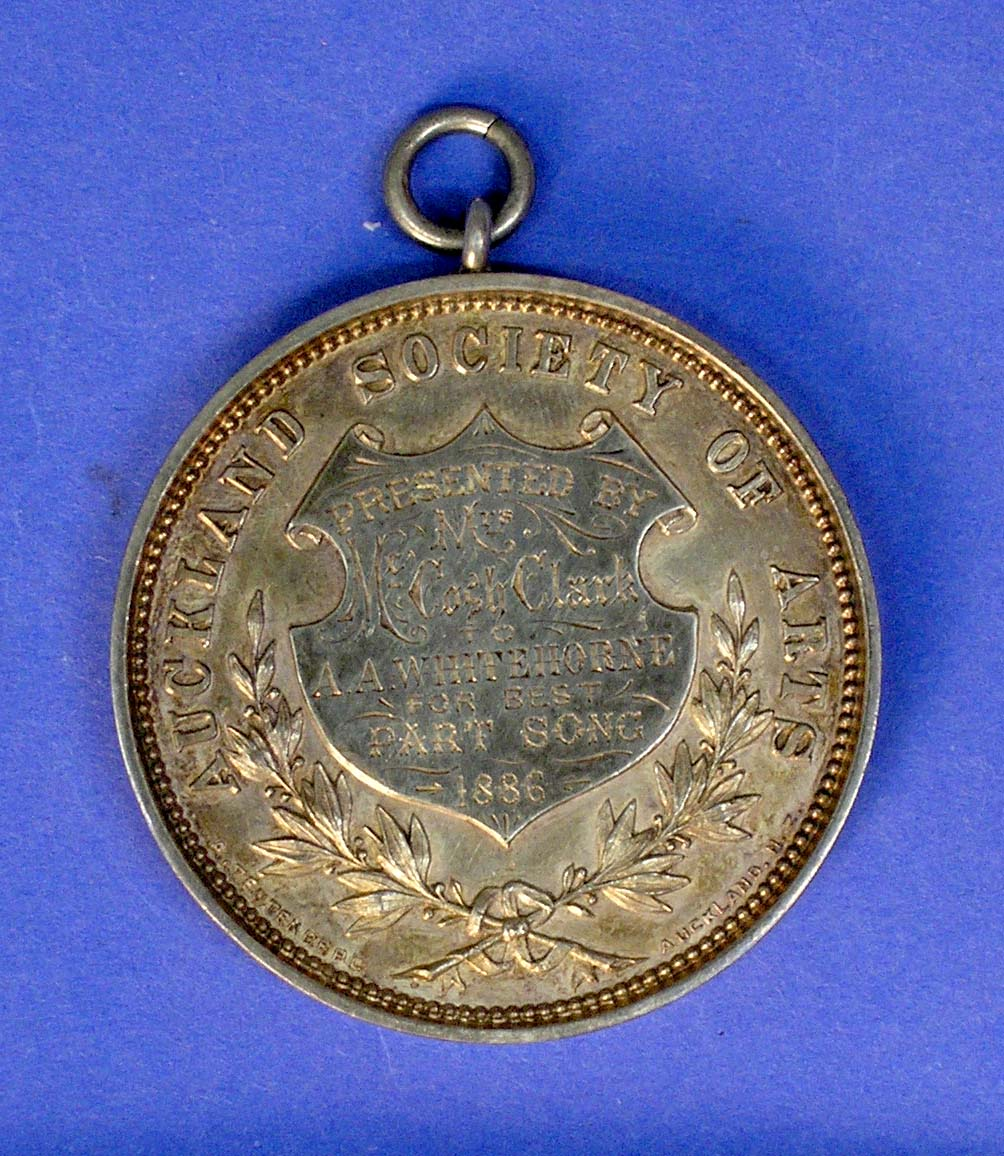
(Back) An Auckland Society of Arts medal awarded to A.A. Whitehorne.

(Front) An Auckland Society of Arts medal awarded to A.A. Whitehorne.

Other medals included recognition for First in Colour, First in Monochrome, and Second in Monochrome. A unique record of Frederick J. Porter's medal for achievement in Class B Section 8 is also held at Te Papa Tongarewa.

The society ran many competitions throughout its time in mediums ranging from pottery, to sculpture, and painting, to increase engagement with the society whilst also supporting emerging and established artists. From October to November 1954, the society ran a competition open to all New Zealand artists centred around "The Religious Theme in Art." The committee accepted entries in the form of paintings and newly completed sculptures, all in the running for a monetary prize valued at £100. Another example from 1992 was in collaboration with the Press for the Wiremark Award for Sculpture valued at $7000. Eight artists entered including Andrew Drummond, Pauline Rhodes, Ralph Hotere, Jeff Thomson, Para Matchitt, Mart'e Szirmay, Peter Roche, and Lucy Macdonald. A second form of engagement established was the school competition which allowed youth and student entries for exhibition and judging. For the 1881 showing, Master Joseph Williams from Napier was awarded first place for his piece "A Group of Fruit from the Round", second place went to Master Clayton from Parnell, and third to Miss G. Purchas from Auckland.

Alongside competitions the society had opportunities for artists to auction off their work for charity. For example, in 1989 the society financially assisted a charity for children with immune deficiencies. The charity dealt with an incident of a businessman named Mr Anthony Philpot who supposedly raised thousands of dollars for them but then mysteriously vanished. An initiative named "Operation Kids" was then set up by Leanne Beransconi to run different events in hopes of raising the money for the charity. However Mr Alan Mountain and Mrs Margot Mountain, "a long-time member of the Auckland Society of Arts," organised an auction of a watercolour painting of Rangitoto Island and some other prints of the original. The charity event aimed to raise over $20,000, working towards one of their main goals of $200,000 for a cell sorting machine for the Auckland Medical School.

== Select exhibitions ==
Alongside their annual exhibitions for all members, the society hosted multiple individual and group exhibitions for their members each year that covered varying themes and mediums. Select exhibitions of theirs include the following:

Exhibitions & artists
Title	Artists	Location	Date	Catalogue
Black and White Exhibition. Drawings, Paintings and Sketches "in black and white"	Mrs J. M. Clark, Mr. Albin Martin, Miss Fauny Martin, Miss Emily Martin, Mrs L. W. Harrop, Miss E. Cheeseman, Miss Rose Keesing, Miss Bleazard, Mr. Charles Blomfield, Mr. Drummond, Mr. Ball, Miss C. W. Horne, Miss M. A. Eames, Miss I. Outhwaite, Miss Kenderdine, Rev. P. Walsh, Bishop Cowie, Mr. Alfred Sharpe, Mrs. Butcher, Mr. Kinder, Mr. Whitmore, Miss Plumley, Master W. Clayton, Miss Ethel Snelling, Miss Hooper, Miss Helen Brown, Miss B. Brown, Mr. Samuel Herapath, Miss Tye, Mr George C. Beale, Mrs. Amphlett	Auckland Museum	November 10 1881	Catalogue
Auckland Society of Arts. Catalogue of Spring Exhibition	Katherine Rayner, Ida G. Eise, H. Tornquist, A. Ramsay, Salome Coombs, Zoe Hamilton, Ida H. Carey, L. F. Fraser, I. M. Copeland, M. J. Wilkie, Guy C. Mountain, Pascoe Redwood, K. B. Robson, Russell F. Whittome, D. J. Payne, R. Pheney, Adele Younghusband, Ida Hogan, Alice F. Whyte, J. Turkington, Ivy Perry, B. Jackson, A. B. Dawson, A. Hansen, H. Matthewman, Lucretia Johnson, Ella Spicer, A. E. Austin, E. Fenton, B. Jackson, Ellice Alison, E. Goodfellow, May O. Gilbert, D. V. Young, Martha Buchanan, Dorothy Ashton, Walter J. Pearce, Frances H. Wright, W. Bassett, Hilda Wiseman, Alice J. Westwood, M. Lynn Gurney, Elizabeth Ryburn, W. Passett, O. Harrison-Smith, V. Crisp, E. Wadham, A. M. Davies, F. P. Worley, Winifred Simpson, Zoe Hamilton, Connie Lloyd, G. H. Nichols, Lois White, P. S. Herbert, C. C. Roberts, Mrs. M. Cheal, Briar Gardner, Josephine Mulvany, Sybil Mary Mulvany	Location Unknown	10 - 14 October 1932	Catalogue
Auckland Society of Arts. Festival '40' Exhibition. Auckland Festival of Arts	Mark Venables, Sandy Matheson, Molly C Stewart, Ruth Coyle, Cyril Whiteoak, Arthur Thompson, Roger Hart, M.H. de Carteret, John Stackhouse, Jack W. Crippen, Ron Stenberg, Jan Nigro, Elsie Mourant, E. Mervin Taylor, Nan Manchester, Susan Skerman, Nelson Thompson, Sina Woolcott, Arthur Thompson, John Tole, Edwin A. Dutch, Dorothy Morton, Don Lever, Gwyneth Richardson, A.G. Funnel, Dorothy V. Young, David Kennedy, Jean Horsley.	4 Eden Crescent	May 24 - June 7 (estimated 1940s)	Catalogue
Auckland Society of Arts. Summer Exhibition Catalogue.	Winifred Rowe, E. Wadham, John Tole, I. M. Copeland, Dorothy Morton, F. W. Gross, A. B. Barnes Graham, G. Warren, A. Reid, U. L. Holler, Frances Hunt, Winifred Bodle, John Campbell Duncan, Anna Robinson, I. G. Eise, Lois White, Alice F. Whyte, A. B. Barnes-Graham, Bessie Christie, D. Vallance Young, Ron Stenberg, Minnie F. White, C. Duckworth, Vida Steinert, Charles Tole, K. Rayner, A. C. Hipwell, Elsie M. White, Amy B. Dawson, M. Spence, E. Seed, M. Buchanan, Hazel Dalton, Sina Woolcott, W. S. Dudley, Hilda Wiseman, F. Stevens, Jean McKay, M. Lees, Joy Field, F. H. Wright, Herbert E. Rodgers, Ella Spicer, Ivy M. Copeland, Frances Hunt, Lillias Lane, R. Tizard, Peggy Spicer, Gwyneth Richardson, May Gilbert, Helen Brown, F. Thorpe, G. L. Lee, Lynne Hamilton, Marguerite W. Crookes, Jean Robertson, B. Jackson, P. Wilkinson, Connie Lloyd, Roland Brialey, Nance Porett Patrick, Vernon Brown, L. F. Fraser, Olive Jones, Work Presented on Behalf of Council of Adult Education	Location Unknown	28 November -, 1941	Catalogue
Paintings. Drawings. Engravings. By William Jones	William Jones	Auckland Society of Arts Gallery	February 17 - February 28, 1958	Catalogue
Paintings, Drawings and Mosaics by Hannah Schrikkel	Hannah Schrikkel	4 Eden Crescent	15 - 17 February 1960	Catalogue
Artists & Craftsmen in New Zealand. Associated with David Ingram of David's Bookshop	David Brokenshire, Len Castle, Roy Cowan, Juliet Peter, Harry & May Davis, Jack Laird, Patricia Perrin, Jeff Scholes, Helen Mason, Mirek Smisek, Peter Stitchbury, Paul Beadle, Alison Duff, Peter Janssen, Molly Macalister, John Middleditch, Greer Twiss, Kobi Bosshard, Jens Hansen, Guenter Taemmler, Zena Abbot, Karen Wakely, Frank Finan.	Auckland Society of Arts Gallery	September 15 - October 3 (estimated early 1970s)	Catalogue
The Paintings Of Barbara Joseph, Bridie Lonie, Helen Mitchell, Belinda Wilson	Barbara Joseph, Bridie Lonie, Helen Mitchell, Belinda Wilson	4 Eden Crescent	December 8 - 19 (estimated 1970s)	Catalogue
Lucille Cranwell - Drawings	Lucille Cranwell	4 Eden Crescent	16-27 June 1975	Catalogue
"Our common denominator...the Human Figure"	Marjory Edwards	4 Eden Crescent	18-29 August 1975	Catalogue
Auckland Society of Arts. Exhibition Catalogue by Affiliated Art Societies	Tokoroa Art Society: John G. Smithson, Zelda Paul, Jocelyn Glucina, Cambridge Society of Arts: Joan Ogilvie, M. F. B. Esling, June Shannon, Norman Willers, Joan Britton, Norman Willers, E. C. Cleland, Kay Walsh, Gwen Chard, L. C. Morgan, Stephen Sims, Dorothy Philpot, L. T. Norwell Taranaki Society of Arts: M. Fletcher, Dorothy E. Lange, J. Leggott, Mavis Standish, Colin Nicholls, R. P. Hull Northland Society of Arts: Muriel Wilson Mary L. Rathbone, Mary Bridger, Natalie Findlay, Thyrza Bindon, Win Parkinson, Muriel Fisher, Lois Naismith, H. L. Jounneaux, Diana Watson, Freda Simmonds, S. Cole, Jackie Fulton Rotorua Society of Arts: Alison Caulton, Kaye Herrick, Ian McMillan, Joan Thornton, Julie Clarke, Frank Davidge, Liz Brann, Walter Bakkenes, Helen Mountfort, Debbie Thyne, Basil Honour. Waikato Society of Arts: Joan Page, Buck Nin, Ruth Davey, Rena Swallow, D. M. Ridall, S. C. Smith, Jean Fairburn, Mary McIntyre, Margot Philips, Jan Lucas, Joan Fear, Heather Lomas, Frank Forster, R.B.K. Gardner, Ray Starr. Hawke's Bay Society of Arts: G. F. Fuller, Patricia Davidson, Nan Rusbatch, Helen Arthur, Phyllis Simmonds, I. G. Brown, Dawn Irewheelar, Dorothy Waters, Peter Liley, W. A. Mac Cormick, Diana Harland, W. A. G. Penlington, G. W. E. Edwards, C. M. J. Blow, L. M. Theakstone	4 Eden Crescent	September 6 - 13 1975	Catalogue
'Twenty-Five Portraits' - Lucille Cranwell - Exhibition of Brush Drawings and Paintings	Lucille Cranwell	Location Unknown	Estimated 1976	Catalogue
Oil Paintings By C. D. R. Lobban	C. D. R. Lobban	Location Unknown	Estimated 1976	Catalogue
Brian A Reid DFA 'New Zealand Women'	Brian A Reid DFA	Location Unknown	1969-1976	Catalogue
Members Autumn Exhibition	1987 Auckland Society of Arts members	4 Eden Crescent	April 27 - May 8 1987	Catalogue
3 Exhibitions	David Jones, Dave Gunson and Kalvin Collins	13 Blake Street, Ponsonby	April 23 - May 3 c. 1980s-1990s	Catalogue

Members with external biographical pages: Bessie Christie, Beatrice Enid Bell, Ida Eise, Lois White, Charles Blomfield

== Exhibition photos ==
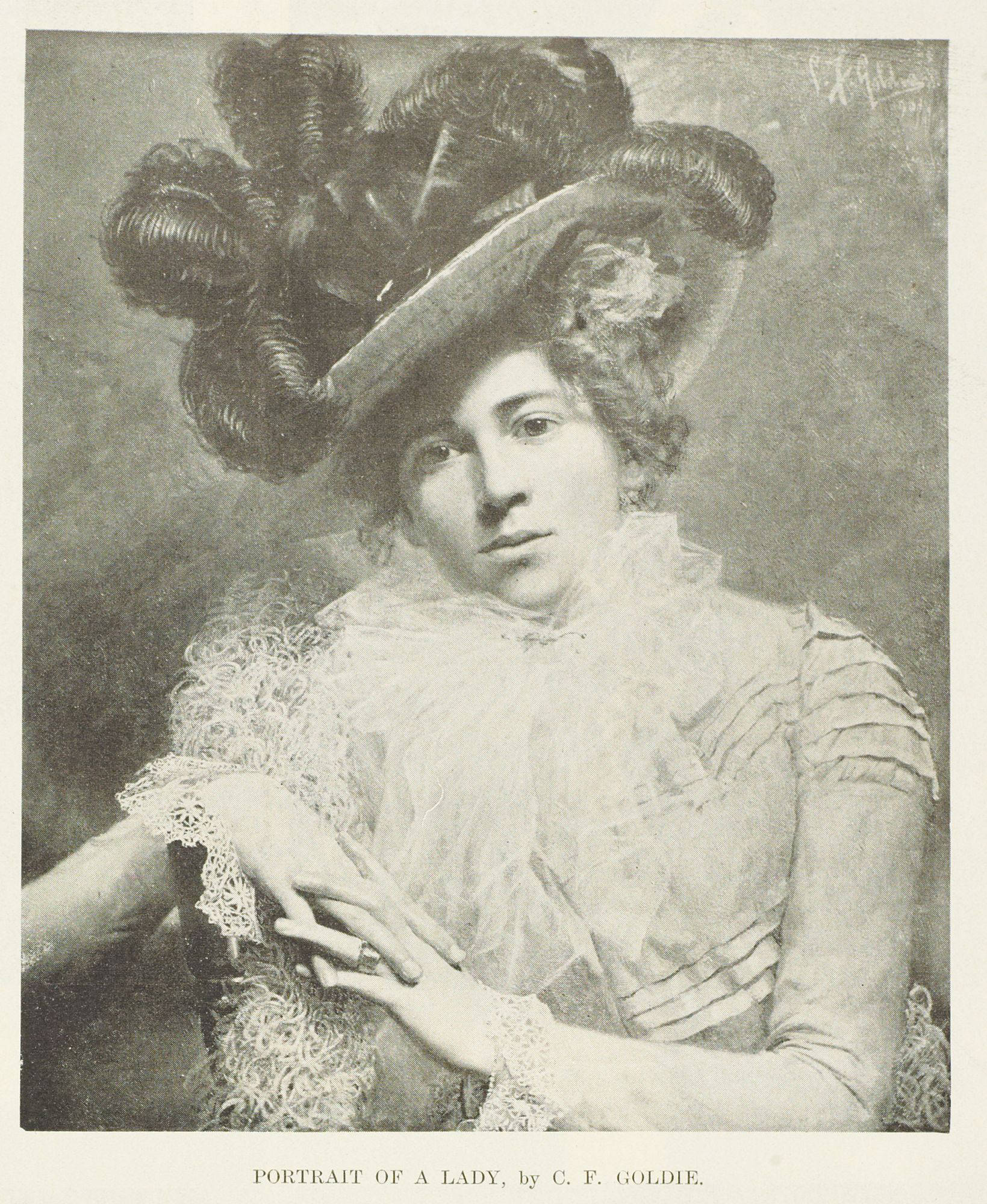
Portrait of a Lady, by C. F. Goldie 1905

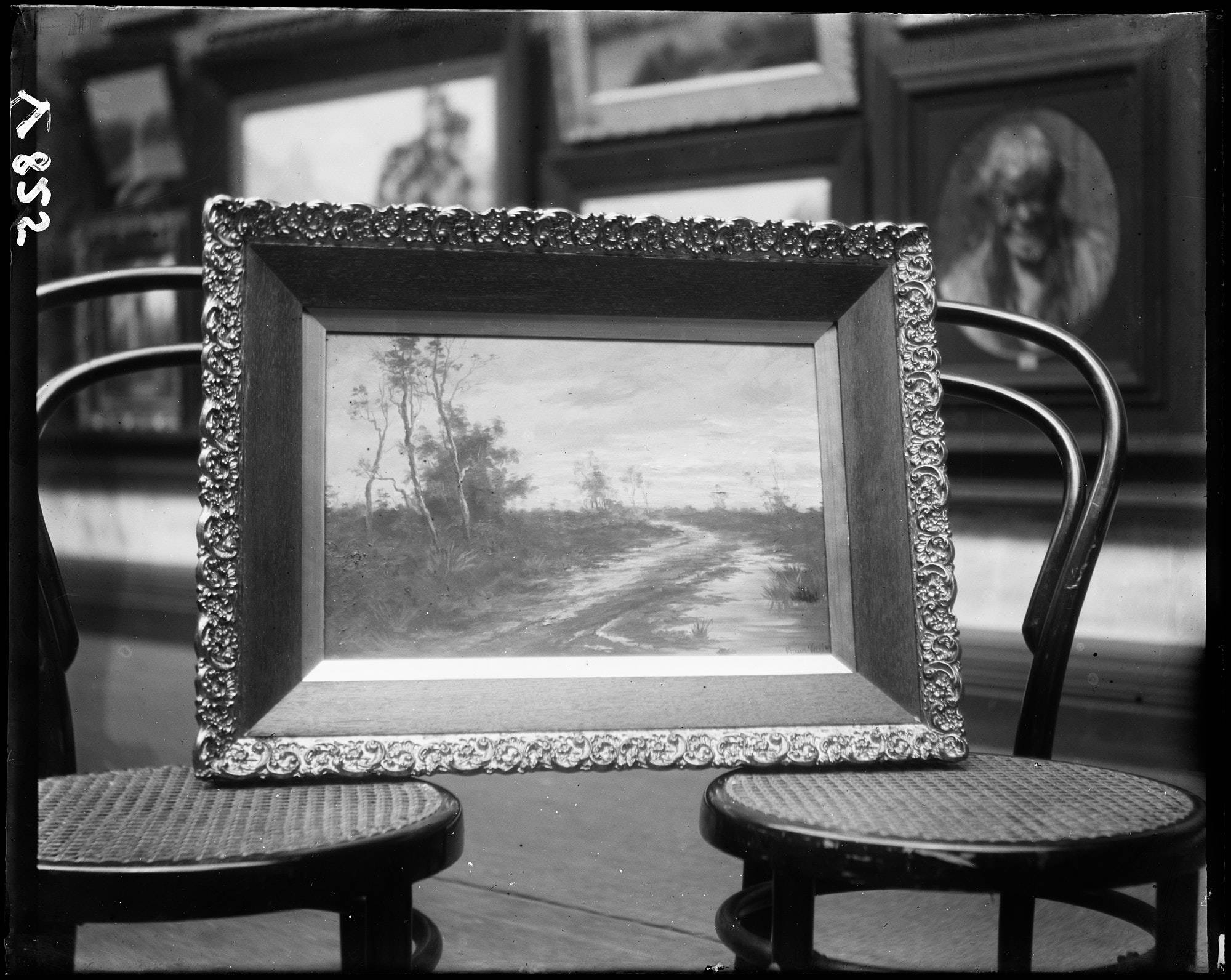
Framed painting by Annie Vaile at Auckland Society of Arts exhibition, signed by the artist.

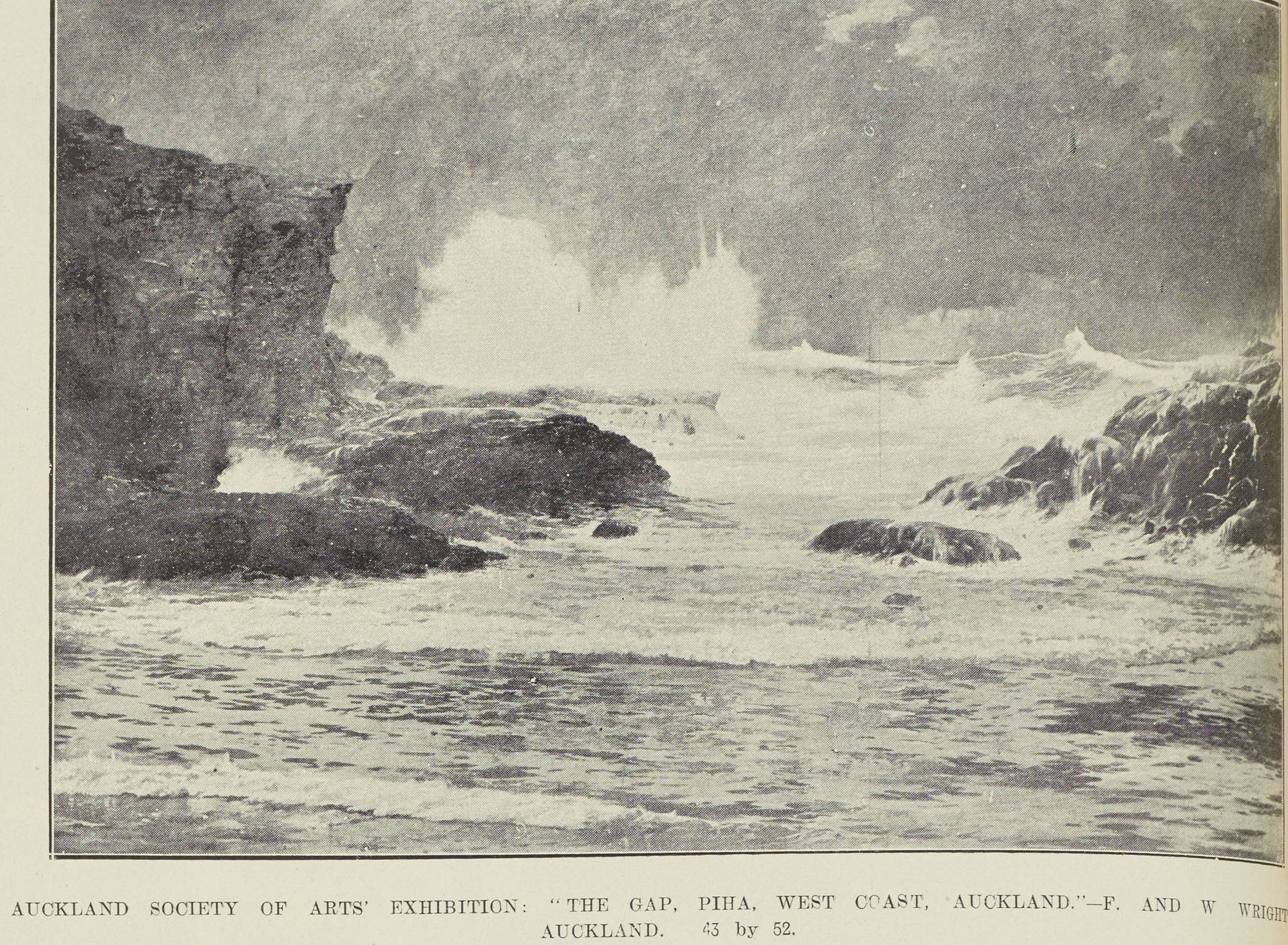
Auckland Society of Arts Exhibition - The Gap, Piha, West Coast, Auckland.

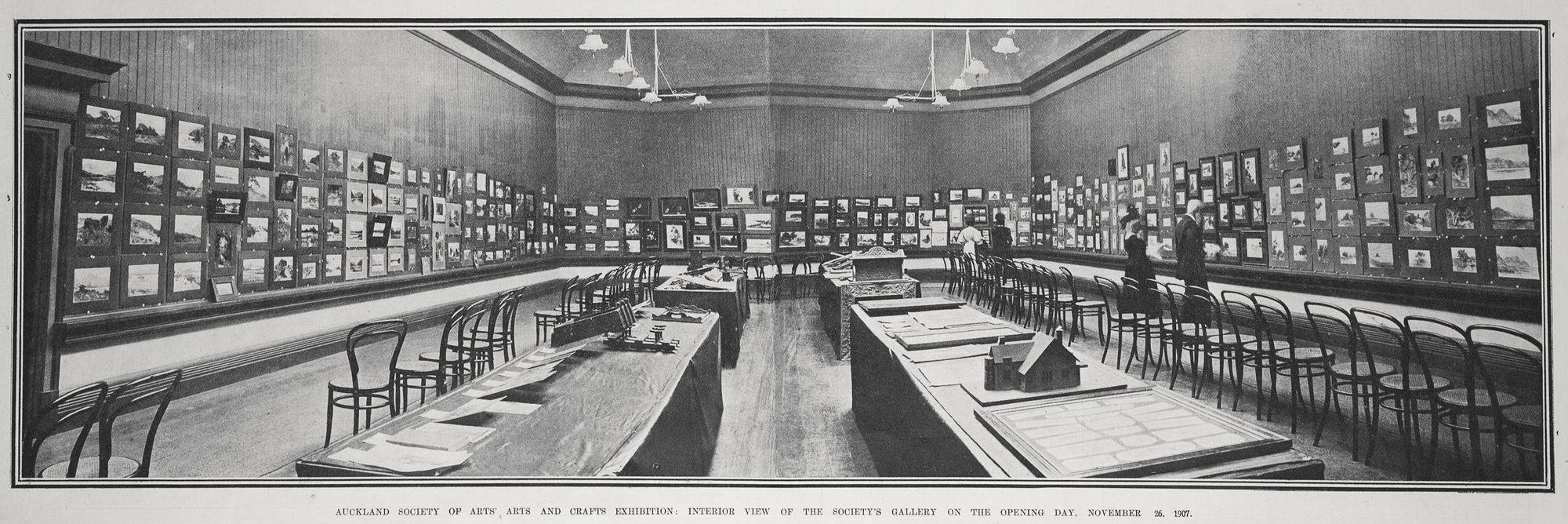
ASA Arts and Crafts Exhibition Interior 1907.

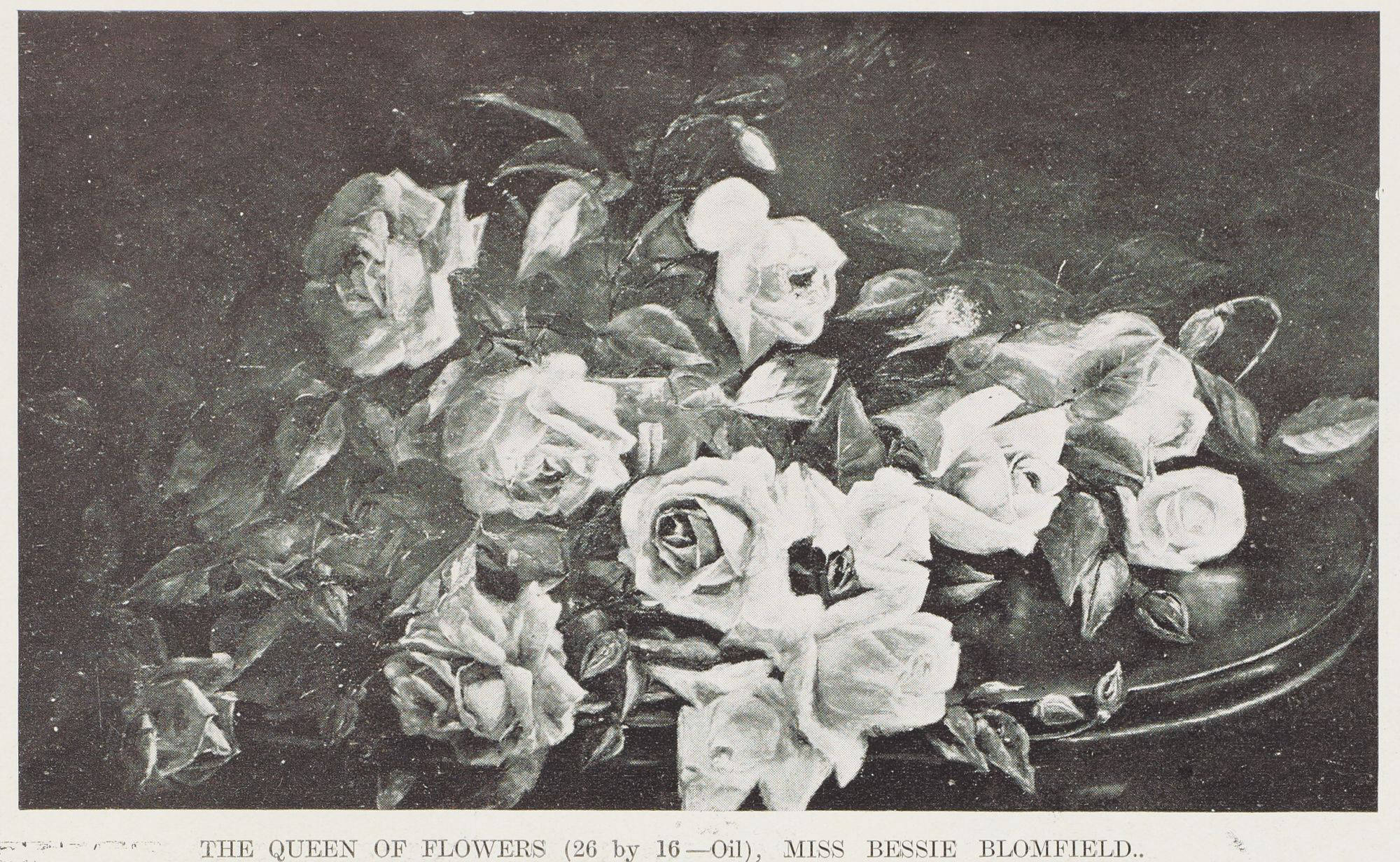
The Queen of Flowers, by Bessie Blomfield 1908

Many more can be found in the Auckland Libraries collections.

== Auckland Art Society annual exhibitions ==
- 2nd Annual, 20 - 26 April 1882
- 4th Annual, 25 April - 2 May 1884
- 6th Annual, 15 - 26 April, 1886
- 7th Annual, 14 - 23 April 1887
- 8th Annual, 12 - 26 April 1888
- 9th Annual, 2 - 16 May 1889
- 16th Annual, 22 April - 2 May 1896
- 17th Annual, 14 - 28 April 1897
- 18th Annual, 27 April - 11 May 1898
- 19th Annual, 8 - 22 November 1899
- 20th Annual, 17 - 31 October 1900
- 21st Annual, 23 October - 6 November 1901
- 22nd Annual, 30 April - 13 May 1903
- 23rd Annual, 27 April - 11 May 1904
- 24th Annual, 12 July - 5 August 1905
- 26th Annual, 24 April - 11 May 1907
- 27th Annual, 20 May - 6 June 1908
- 28th Annual, 19 May - 12 June 1909
- 29th Annual, 26 May - 18 June 1910
- 30th Annual, 25 May - 17 June 1911
- 31st Annual, 16 May - 8 June 1912
- 32nd Annual, 22 May - 14 June 1913
- 33rd Annual, 21 May - 13 June 1914
- 34th Annual, 20 - 29 May 1915
- 35th Annual, 1 - 17 June 1916
- 36th Annual, 31 May - 14 June 1917
- 37th Annual, 30 May - 15 June 1918
- 38th Annual, 29 May - 14 June 1919
- 39th Annual, 28 May - 12 June 1920
- 41st Annual, 25 May - 10 June 1922
- 42nd Annual, 14 June - 7 July 1923
- 43rd Annual, 12 June - 12 July 1924
- 44th Annual, 10 June - 1 July 1925
- 45th Annual, 10 June - 3 July 1926
- 46th Annual, 30 June - 21 July 1927
- 47th Annual, 28 May - 9 June 1928
- 48th Annual, 29 May - 20 June 1929
- 49th Annual, 23 May - 7 June 1930
- 50th Annual, 21 May - 6 June 1931
- 51st Annual, 12 - 25 May 1932
- 52nd Annual, 27 April - 12 May 1933
- 53rd Annual, 26 April - 11 May 1934
- 54th Annual, 2 - 17 May 1935
- 55th Annual, 4 - 19 June 1936
- 56th Annual, 22 May - 4 June 1937
- 57th Annual, 19 May - 3 June 1938
- 58th Annual, 25 May - 7 June 1939
- 59th Annual, 15 - 28 May 1940
- 60th Annual, 15 - 31 May 1941
- 61st Annual, 4 - 27 June 1942
- 62nd Annual, 14 May - 4 June 1943
- 63rd Annual, 7 June - 2 July 1944
- 64th Annual, 19 May 1945
- 65th Annual, 3 May 1946
- 66th Annual, 16 May - 6 June 1947
- 67th Annual, 7 - 30 May 1948
- 68th Annual, 12 May - 5 June 1949
- 69th Annual, 12 - 31 May 1950
- [Unknown] Annual, 28 May - 17 June 1951
- [Unknown] Annual, 24 June - 13 July 1952
- 73rd Annual, 4 June - 5 July 1953
- 74th Annual, 11 May - 3 June 1954
- 75th Annual, 11 May - 2 June 1955
- 67th Annual, 21 September - 14 October 1956
- 90th Anniversary Retrospective, 1 - 30 October 1959
- 89th Annual, 8 - 30 March 1960
- 90th Annual, 1961
- Administrative Reports and Catalogues Inventory - 1870 - 2005

== Early illustrated exhibition catalogue covers ==
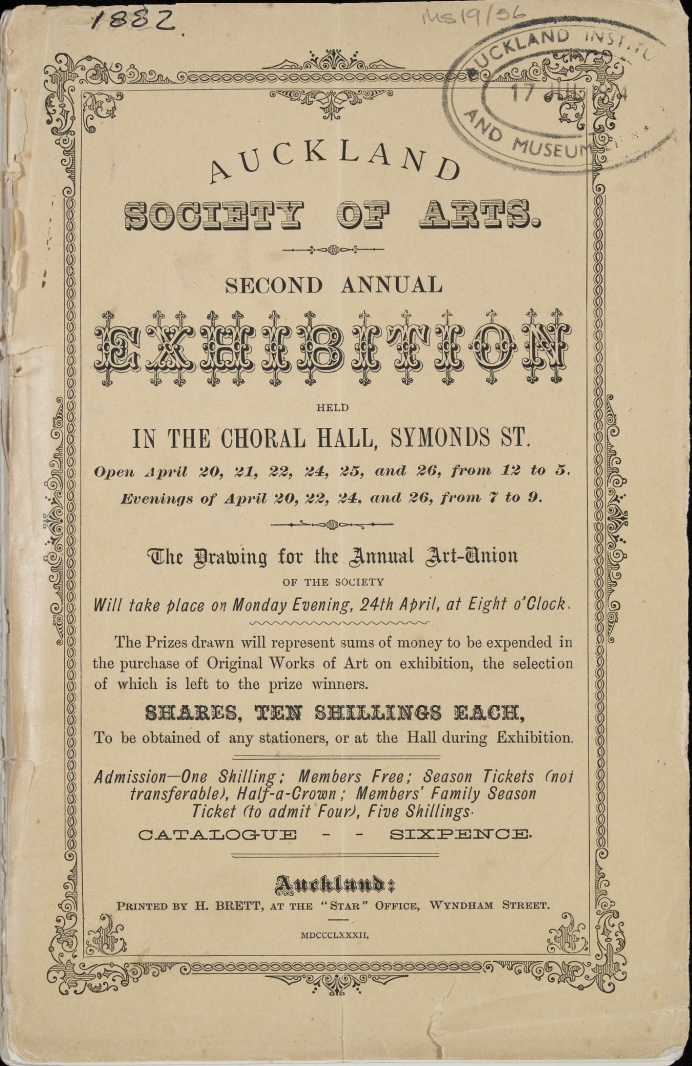
Auckland Society of Arts 2nd Annual Exhibition Catalogue Cover.

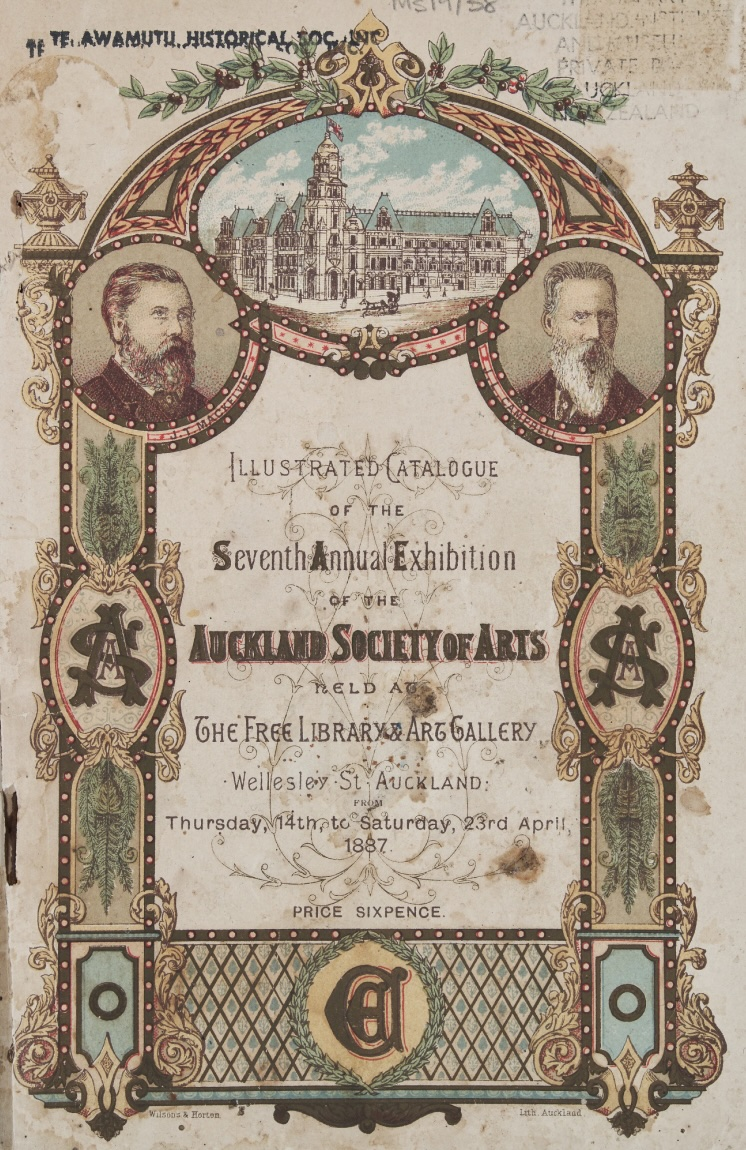
ASA 7th Annual Exhibition Catalogue Cover, 1887.

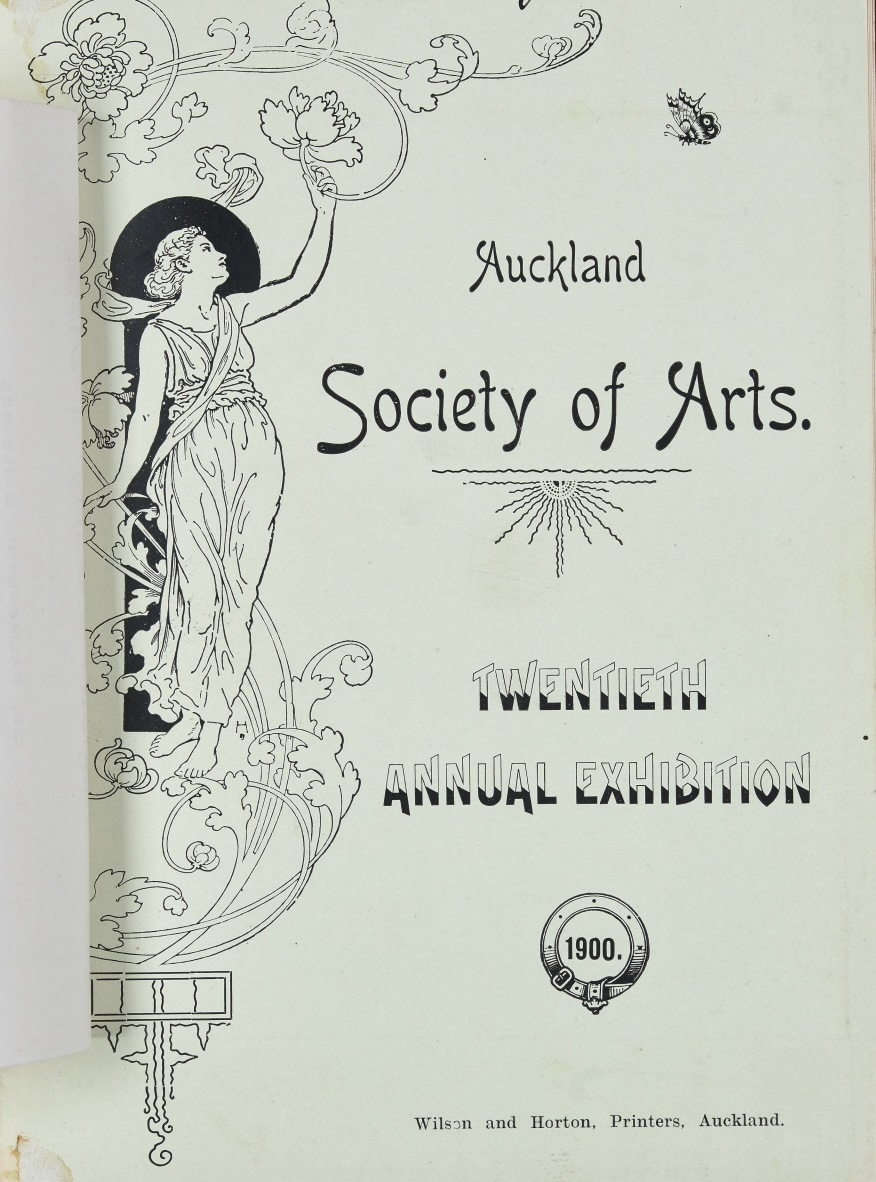
ASA 20th Annual Exhibition Catalogue Cover.

== Individual artist records 1873 - 1947 ==
- A-G Catalogue
- H-L Catalogue
- M-Q Catalogue
- R-Z Catalogue

== Māori artists ==
Māori artist Selwyn Muru showed six paintings at the annual autumn exhibition for Auckland Society of Arts in 1963. He included his impressionist landscape works as well as paintings with traditional Māori motifs. At the 1963 exhibition the head of the committee Professor Paul Beadle decided to only present a selective range of sixteen paintings, with six of them being by Muru. The artist received positive feedback in the media and from Dr John Reid who opened the exhibition.

Much representation of Māori in art of the 19th and early 20th centuries had colonial undertones. European artist Mr Charles Frederick Goldie painted many well-known portraits of Māori throughout his career and exhibited some with the Auckland Society of Arts early on. His intent was recorded primarily in 1905 by the New Zealand Illustrated Magazine where they stated Goldie was "devoted to Maori subjects, and painting them is a labour of love."

== Notable members ==
The society had many notable members throughout their time. Some examples of these members are the following:

- J.C. Hoyte: a prominent watercolour artist in Auckland in the 1860s-70s, a founder of the Auckland Society of Arts
- Mr A. C. Hipwell: a life member of the Auckland Society of Arts, teacher at Ashburton Technical College, art master at King's College from 1936 to 1952, Auckland artist, Kelliher Prize-winner 1957.
- Mr Herbert Richard Tornquist: on the Auckland Society of Arts council, Auckland painter (full time after retiring in 1946) and portrait photographer, attended Elam School of Art and the Chicago Art Institute, a World War I Royal Flying Corps instructor in Canada, winner of Bledisloe medal in 1959.
- Mrs D. T. L. Double: a member of the Auckland Society of Arts and Womens' Committee, a mother of four from Onehunga, first women National Party candidate of Onehunga elected, president of the New Zealand Penwomen's Club, recipient of St. David's Presbyterian Church Women's Fellowship, member of Auckland Travel Club and Auckland English Association.
- Rodney Fumpston: an Auckland artist and teacher of printmaking at the Auckland Society of Arts for six years 1978-84.
- John Weeks: a council member of the Auckland Society of Arts, New Zealand painter, painting senior lecturer at Elam School of Fine Arts from 1929 to 1933 (retired 1954), came to New Zealand in 1908 from Devonshire and trained in art in Auckland, served in France during World War I, and then travelled and painted in Morocco, Corsica, Italy, and France, recipient of the Officer of the Order of the British Empire for contributions to art in 1958.
- Mrs V. Curtis: well-known artist of portraits and miniatures, attended Elam School of Art and became an art teacher, attended the Heatherley Impressionist School in London, she exhibited portraits and animal studies at the Auckland Society of Arts, she painted portraits of Miss New Zealand finalists and had her work displayed in the Paris Salon, the Royal Institute Galleries London, the International Institute of Art, and Letters at Munich.

== Companies advertised ==
In the early 1900s an influx of advertisements being placed in each exhibition catalogue is apparent. The range of businesses promoted was broad but many were tailored towards artists, travellers, and tourists, as well as supporting local Auckland businesses often nearby like Queen Street and Victoria Street.

=== 34th edition (1915) ===
- Highlander condensed milk, Murrays Limited Invercargill
- G. W. Spragg Auckland Garage
- John Leech, Carver, Gilder, and Picture Framer
- Walker's Phoneries
- Lyric Theatre, Symonds Street
- Ernest G. Skeates, Jeweller
- Ernest A. Rimmer, Oriental Art Specialist
- Hill & Plummer, Ltd, Picture Framers
- Harringtons' Cameras, Cameras, Kodaks & Photographic Supplies
- National Piano Company, Ltd, Auckland

=== 52nd edition (1933) ===
- Wattle Tea Rooms and Catering Company
- Goodwill Travel Service
- Phillipps & Impey Ltd, Picture Framers and Stockists
- Geo. E. Spooner, Art Dealer and Picture Framer
- John Leech, Carver, Gilder, Picture Framer, and Art Dealer
- Art Stone Studio

=== 90th ann. edition (1959) ===
- Printing Plus, The Elusive Elements
- Tracy L. Bieleski, Colour Printer
- New Vision Art Centre
- Warne Bros., Specialists in Residential Construction
- Paul's Art Department
- Paul's Book Arcade (Auckland) Ltd.
- Crown Lynn Potteries Limited.
- John Reid & Co. Ltd.
- Rennies - Illustrations Ltd
- Phillipps & Impey Ltd.
- The New Zealand Insurance Company Limited
- Dominion Breweries Ltd., Otahuhu, Auckland
- Pan American Airlines
- The New Zealand Express Co. (Auckland) Ltd.
- Scarborough Bros. Landscape Gardeners.
- John Leech Gallery
