= Elise Mourant =

New Zealand artist (1921–1990)

- Born: Elise Constance Mourant; 29 October 1921; Wellington, New Zealand
- Died: 29 April 1990 (aged 68); Royal Oak, Auckland, New Zealand
- Education: Wellington Technical College, National College of Art and Design (Dublin), Slade School of Fine Art (London), Elam School of Fine Art (London)
- Known for: Painting - landscapes

Elise Constance Mourant (29 October 1921 – 29 April 1990) was a New Zealand artist. Works by Mourant are held in the collection of the Museum of New Zealand Te Papa Tongarewa.

== Education ==
Mourant studied at Wellington Technical College prior to World War II, alongside Thomas Arthur McCormack and Nugent Welch. She studied painting at the National College of Art and Design in Dublin, the Slade School of Fine Art in London, and the Elam School of Fine Art in Auckland from 1943.

== Career ==
Mourant was known for her landscapes, still life paintings, and urban scenes. She exhibited with the Auckland Society of Arts (with solo exhibitions in 1947 and 1949) and the New Zealand Academy of Fine Arts. She also exhibited with Christchurch-based art association, The Group, in 1950. She was a member of the Rutland Group of artists, along with John Weeks, John and Charles Tole, and Ida Eise.

Works by Mourant include: Summer landscape, Auckland; Irises; Lily Lane, Melbourne, and Poppies and cistus.
