= Lois White =

New Zealand painter and teacher (1903–1984)

- Born: 2 November 1903; Auckland
- Died: 13 September 1984 (aged 80); Auckland
- Alma mater: Elam School of Fine Arts
- Occupation: Painter, printmaker
- Employer: Elam School of Fine Arts (1927–1963); Takapuna Grammar School

Anna Lois White (2 November 1903 – 13 September 1984), known in the art world as Lois (pronounced Loyce) White, was a New Zealand painter of the modernist school. She taught at the Elam Art School of the University of Auckland from 1927 until 1963.

== Biography ==
White was the youngest of four children. Her family were middle-class, and her father, Arthur Herbert White, was an Auckland architect. Her mother, Annie White (Phillips), was a notable member of the Mount Albert Methodist church. Her family played a key role in fostering the growth and progress of Methodism in the Mount Albert and Mount Roskill boroughs of Auckland. White's maternal grandfather ran W. Phillips & Sons, an importer of prints and artists' materials. In 1920, White's father died, marking the end of monetary comfort. Her family would be left to rely on financial assistance from other relatives for some time after her father's death.

White attended Epsom Girls' Grammar School from 1919 to 1922, excelling at all subjects. She was the top competitive swimmer at her school, winning every race to earn the Upper School Champion. Moreover, White showed potential as an artist from early on, being a valued member of the Epsom Girls' sketch club, in which she was 'highly commended' for her artistic contributions.

In 1923, White enrolled at Elam. A year and a half later, in 1925, A.J.C Fisher became the director of the school. White credited Fisher as one of her strongest influences, saying he inspired her to use painting and design to express ideas. During her studies, Fisher also introduced White to the compositions of the old masters, and she was particularly captivated by Botticelli's figure compositions.

White went on her first overseas trip in 1960, travelling extensively throughout Europe with her friend, Ida Eise, for several months. During this time, they visited as many art galleries, museums and churches as possible. They lived and travelled within the UK until 1962, when they returned to Auckland.

== Career ==
In 1928, White graduated from Elam and became a part-time tutor at the school, teaching the junior drawing classes. At the same time, she took a part-time position teaching art at Takapuna Grammar School. She would continue to live at home with her mother and sister, Gwen, to provide financial support. Her career as a painter continued concurrently with her teaching career, and she was accepted as a full "Working Member" of the Auckland Society of Arts in 1931 and exhibited regularly with the Society.

From 1934, White was a full-time teacher at Elam, keeping this position until her retirement in January 1963. Her retirement was not by choice. When she returned from her overseas travels, she discovered that the majority of the new staff and students disliked her art and teaching styles and began to ostracise her. She was soon asked to settle her superannuation entitlements and take early retirement.

=== Art ===
During her time as a teacher, before her overseas travels, White had worked alongside painter John Weeks, whom she considered a friend. White soon realised that they disagreed on the use of colour in painting, with White affirming that disharmonious, clashing colours must be used when depicting disturbing ideas, rather than achieving beautiful colour harmonies that Weeks was known to produce. As a teacher, White strongly encouraged the students to consider how light impacted the shape of a model or object. She also encouraged her students to pay careful attention to how they composed their figures.

Thematically, many of White's works have been recognized as progressive social activism, including her painting Success, which shows a man waving a money bag over a hungry family, and her painting War Makers, exhibited between the World Wars, which shows prosperous older, powerful figures mocking a young soldier. Indeed, White considered herself a socialist as she was passionate about current social injustices. According to Raymond Huber in the book 'Peace Warriors', White described War Makers as intended to expose the injustice of an older generation engaging in war and sending the younger generation to kill and be killed. War Makers is currently on display in the Modern Women: Flight of Time exhibition at Auckland Art Gallery Toi o Tāmaki.

White was one of the founders of the New Group in 1948, a somewhat conservative group of artists concentrating on traditional form and draughtsmanship, in opposition to the younger contemporary artists of The Group, who were pursuing modernist and abstract forms. She was still viewed as a relatively conservative artist, even in her own opinion, until her work was reappraised through solo exhibitions in 1977 and, after her death, in 1994.

Recently, her work has been reevaluated, and critics have noted the considerable range of styles she pursued during her artistic career, including classical, decorative, social realist, expressionist, fanciful, and pastoral. It is now understood that White was marginalised in the art world because her interest in these modern styles of art did not align with New Zealand's focus on regionalism and landscape traditions, meaning many circles did not understand her work during their day.
