= Cambridge, New Zealand =

Town in Waikato, New Zealand

Cambridge Kemureti (Māori)
- Town
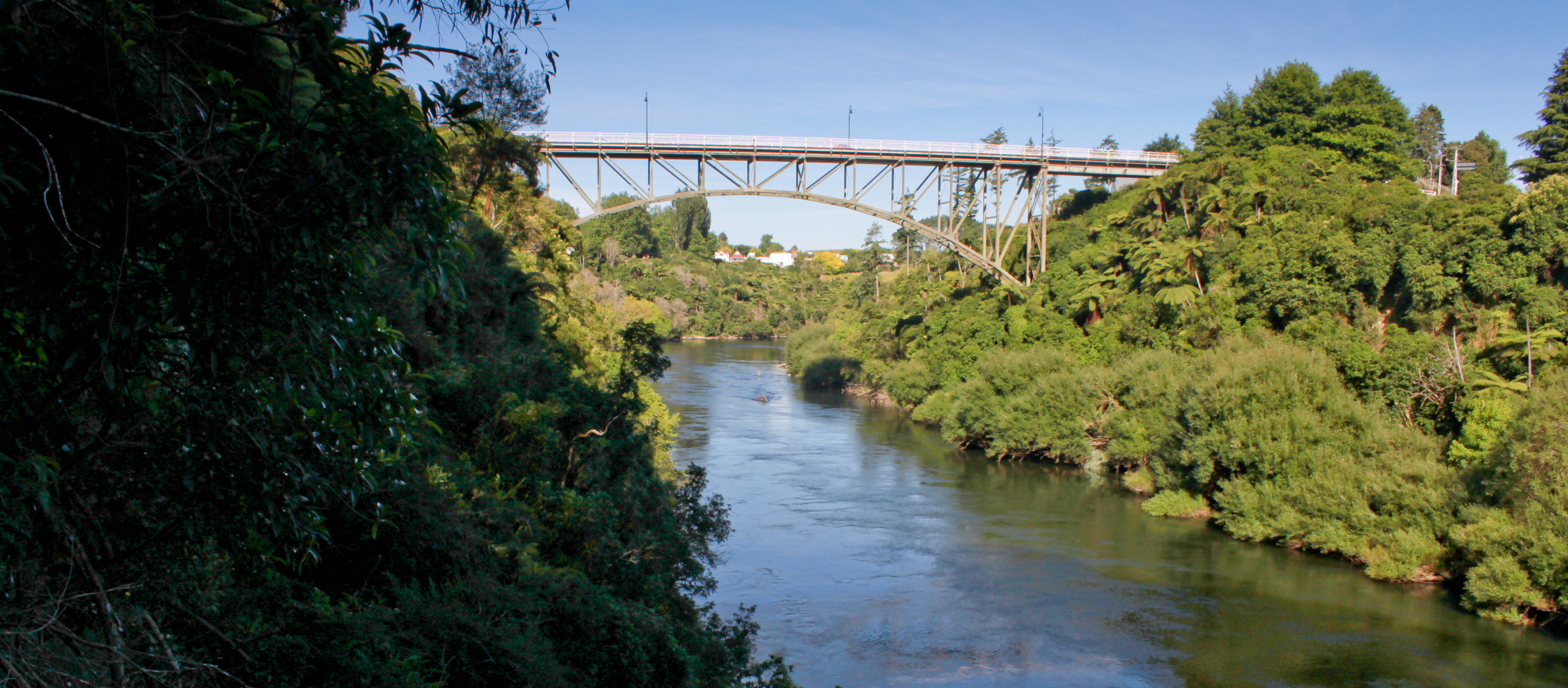
- Victoria Bridge over the Waikato River
- Interactive map of Cambridge
- Coordinates: 37°53′S 175°28′E
- Country: New Zealand
- Region: Waikato
- District: Waipā District
- Ward: Cambridge General Ward
- Community: Cambridge Community
- Electorates: Taupō; Waikato; Hauraki-Waikato (Māori)

Government
  - Territorial Authority: Waipā District Council
  - Regional council: Waikato Regional Council
  - Mayor of Waipa: Mike Pettit
  - Taupō MP: Louise Upston
  - Hauraki-Waikato MP: Hana-Rawhiti Maipi-Clarke

Area
  - Total: 27.35 km^{2} (10.56 sq mi)

Population (June 2025)
  - Total: 22,700
  - Density: 830/km^{2} (2,150/sq mi)
- Postcode: 3432, 3434

Cambridge (Māori: Kemureti) is a town in the Waipā District of the Waikato region of the North Island of New Zealand. Situated 24 kilometres (15 mi) southeast of Hamilton, on the banks of the Waikato River, Cambridge is known as "The Town of Trees & Champions". The town has a population of 22,700, making it the largest town in the Waipā District, and the third largest urban area in the Waikato (after Hamilton and Taupō).

Cambridge was a finalist in the 2017 and 2019 New Zealand's Most Beautiful Large Town awards, run by Keep New Zealand Beautiful. It was awarded the title New Zealand's Most Beautiful Large Town in October 2019.

== History ==
Prior to the arrival of Europeans there were a number of Māori pā in the vicinity of what would become Cambridge. In the 1850s missionaries and farmers from Britain settled in the area and introduced modern farming practices to local Māori, helping them set up two flour mills and importing grinding wheels from England and France. During the 1850s, wheat cultivation and flour milling expanded in the wider Cambridge area, with Māori-grown produce traded with Auckland.

The European town of Cambridge was established when the 3rd Regiment of the Waikato Militia were settled there in 1864 following the Invasion of the Waikato. The town was named after Prince George, Duke of Cambridge, the Commander-in-Chief of the British Army at the time. Its Māori name Kemureti is a transliteration of the name Cambridge.

Electric street lights were first switched on in 1922. The town has many historic and heritage buildings.

== Demographics ==
Cambridge covers 27.35 km^{2} (10.56 sq mi) and had an estimated population of 22,700 as of June 2025, with a population density of 830 people per km^{2}.

Historical population
Year	Pop.	±% p.a.
2006	13,899	—
2013	16,116	+2.14%
2018	18,681	+3.00%
2023	21,366	+2.72%
The 2006 population is for a smaller area of 26.67 km^{2}. Source:

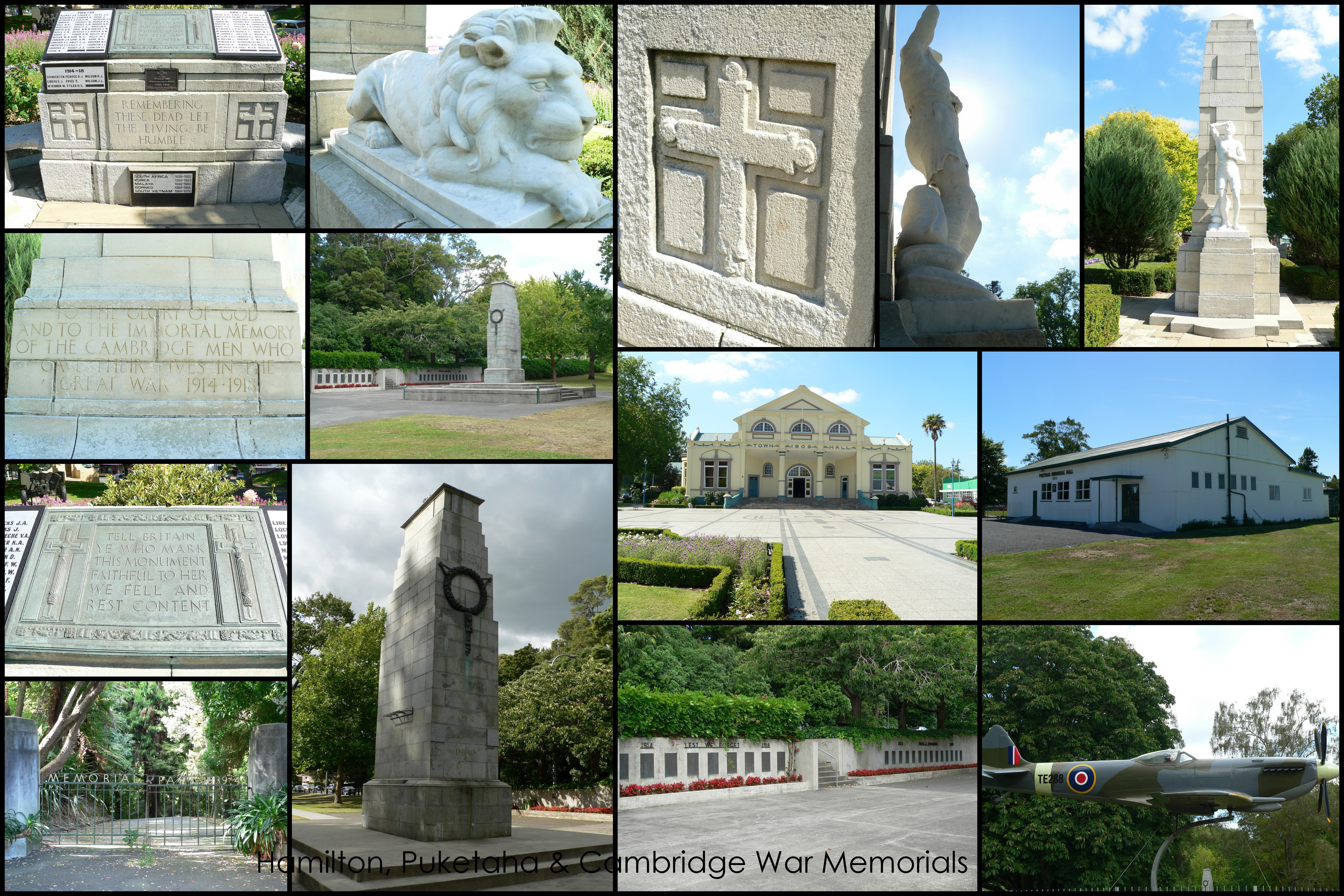
Hamilton, Puketaha and Cambridge war memorials

Cambridge had a population of 21,366 in the 2023 New Zealand census, an increase of 2,685 people (14.4%) since the 2018 census, and an increase of 5,250 people (32.6%) since the 2013 census. There were 10,137 males, 11,157 females, and 72 people of other genders in 8,187 dwellings. 2.5% of people identified as LGBTIQ+. The median age was 42.8 years (compared with 38.1 years nationally). There were 4,062 people (19.0%) aged under 15 years, 3,453 (16.2%) aged 15 to 29, 9,054 (42.4%) aged 30 to 64, and 4,797 (22.5%) aged 65 or older.

People could identify as more than one ethnicity. The results were 88.5% European (Pākehā); 10.9% Māori; 1.8% Pasifika; 7.3% Asian; 0.9% Middle Eastern, Latin American and African New Zealanders (MELAA); and 2.6% other, which includes people giving their ethnicity as "New Zealander". English was spoken by 97.3%, Māori by 1.9%, Samoan by 0.2%, and other languages by 10.6%. No language could be spoken by 1.8% (e.g. too young to talk). New Zealand Sign Language was known by 0.4%. The percentage of people born overseas was 25.4, compared with 28.8% nationally.

Religious affiliations were 33.6% Christian, 1.1% Hindu, 0.4% Islam, 0.4% Māori religious beliefs, 0.6% Buddhist, 0.4% New Age, 0.1% Jewish, and 1.9% other religions. People who answered that they had no religion were 54.5%, and 7.3% of people did not answer the census question.

Of those at least 15 years old, 4,548 (26.3%) people had a bachelor's or higher degree, 8,898 (51.4%) had a post-high school certificate or diploma, and 3,858 (22.3%) people exclusively held high school qualifications. The median income was $43,200, compared with $41,500 nationally. 2,604 people (15.0%) earned over $100,000 compared to 12.1% nationally. The employment status of those at least 15 was 8,475 (49.0%) full-time, 2,421 (14.0%) part-time, and 330 (1.9%) unemployed.

Individual statistical areas
Name	Area (km^{2})	Population	Density (per km^{2})	Dwellings	Median age	Median income
Hautapu	7.43	612	82	210	46.1 years	$37,000
Cambridge North	1.81	2,898	1,601	1,035	43.3 years	$48,600
Cambridge West	2.23	2,592	1,162	1,071	45.8 years	$41,800
Cambridge East	1.58	2,820	1,785	1,077	40.8 years	$41,400
Cambridge Park-River Garden	3.01	1,476	490	522	40.4 years	$51,000
Oaklands-St Kilda	1.68	1,863	1,109	663	46.5 years	$45,000
Cambridge Central	2.82	990	351	522	55.8 years	$35,500
Leamington West	1.26	1,590	1,262	684	44.0 years	$37,300
Leamington South	2.91	2,079	714	747	43.5 years	$46,800
Leamington Central	1.19	2,406	2,022	870	34.9 years	$42,500
Leamington East	1.41	2,031	1,440	783	40.9 years	$45,000
New Zealand					38.1 years	$41,500

== Governance ==
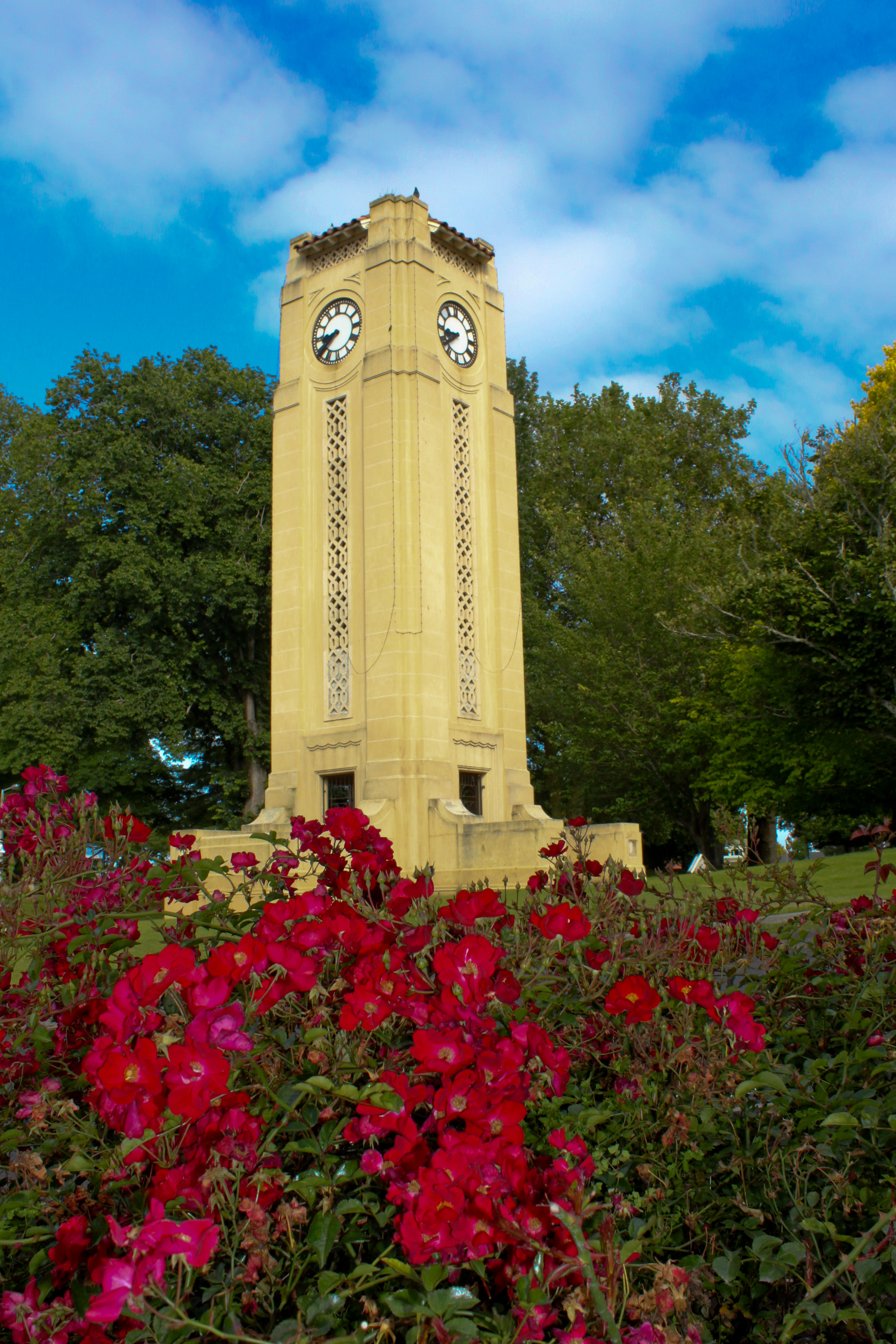
Cambridge clock tower

Cambridge is administered by the Waipā District Council. It is the largest town in the district, but not the seat of the council, which is at Te Awamutu.

Nationally, most of Cambridge is part of the Taupō general electorate and the Hauraki-Waikato Māori electorate. A small section of the town north of the Waikato Expressway is in the Waikato general electorate.

== Economy ==
Cambridge's main sources of employment and income come from dairy farming, tourism, the equine industry and sport. Dairy farming provides more than one in 10 jobs in the Waipā District. The tourism industry supports 12.7% of jobs in Waipā District. The equine industry provides more than 600 jobs in the Waikato, with many based in and around Cambridge. It is estimated that one in five Cambridge residents work in nearby Hamilton.

== Transport ==
Cambridge lies adjacent to State Highway 1, which connects the town with Hamilton in the northwest and Tauranga, Rotorua and Taupō in the southeast. Access to Cambridge from the north is via the Cambridge Road and Victoria Road interchanges, and from the south is via the Tirau Road interchange. Prior to the Waikato Expressway extension opening in December 2015, SH 1 ran through the centre of Cambridge, though in 1985 it had been diverted from the main shopping street, to run via Carters Flat. State Highway 1B leaves SH 1 at the Victoria Road interchange and provides a route north to SH 1 at Taupiri, providing a route north towards Auckland while bypassing Hamilton to the east.

Two bridges cross the Waikato River in Cambridge – Victoria Bridge or the High-level Bridge, which opened in 1907, and Fergusson Bridge or the Low-level Bridge, which opened in 1964 on the site of earlier bridges built in the 1870s.

A public bus service connects Cambridge with central Hamilton via Tamahere and Waikato University several times daily. Hamilton Airport, 18 minutes drive from Cambridge, is the nearest airport and provides daily flights to all New Zealand's main centres.

Until the railway was built the Waikato River was the main form of transport, Cambridge being the limit of navigation. Steamers continued to serve Cambridge until the 1930s. The wharf was near the Karapiro Stream, where the river was wide enough for steamers to turn. Cambridge was the terminus of the Cambridge Branch railway, but this closed beyond Hautapu in 1999.

== Climate ==
Climate data for Cambridge (1971–2000)
Month	Jan	Feb	Mar	Apr	May	Jun	Jul	Aug	Sep	Oct	Nov	Dec	Year
Mean daily maximum °C (°F)	24.1 (75.4)	24.6 (76.3)	22.9 (73.2)	19.8 (67.6)	16.5 (61.7)	13.9 (57.0)	13.4 (56.1)	14.3 (57.7)	16.0 (60.8)	18.1 (64.6)	20.2 (68.4)	22.3 (72.1)	18.8 (65.9)
Daily mean °C (°F)	18.4 (65.1)	18.7 (65.7)	17.2 (63.0)	14.3 (57.7)	11.5 (52.7)	9.4 (48.9)	8.6 (47.5)	9.5 (49.1)	11.2 (52.2)	13.1 (55.6)	14.9 (58.8)	16.8 (62.2)	13.6 (56.5)
Mean daily minimum °C (°F)	12.6 (54.7)	12.9 (55.2)	11.6 (52.9)	8.8 (47.8)	6.5 (43.7)	4.9 (40.8)	3.8 (38.8)	4.8 (40.6)	6.4 (43.5)	8.1 (46.6)	9.7 (49.5)	11.4 (52.5)	8.5 (47.2)
Average rainfall mm (inches)	88.1 (3.47)	79.0 (3.11)	95.8 (3.77)	80.9 (3.19)	87.8 (3.46)	115.9 (4.56)	115.3 (4.54)	94.6 (3.72)	90.2 (3.55)	101.2 (3.98)	86.4 (3.40)	114.2 (4.50)	1,149.4 (45.25)
Source: NIWA

== Sport ==
National sports headquarters

Cambridge and nearby Lake Karapiro have become the homes for national sports organisations such as cycling (track, road, mountain biking and BMX), rowing, triathlon and as high performance centres for kayaking and canoeing.

Cycling

A purpose built velodrome facility, the Grassroots Trust Velodrome, was opened by William and Catherine, the Duke and Duchess of Cambridge, in Cambridge on 12 April 2014. In December 2015, Cambridge hosted the 2015–16 UCI Track Cycling World Cup. There are also many cycle and walking tracks that have been purpose built around Cambridge. The 60 km (37 mi) Te Awa River Ride, from Ngāruawāhia to Karapiro, is planned to be fully open by the end of 2021. It currently has two paths open which are for cyclists and walkers. The purpose built track runs from the centre of Cambridge out to the velodrome and follows the Waikato river. There is also a wide cycleway running from Leamington to Lake Karapiro Domain. Cambridge will host the New Zealand National Road Race Championships and the accompanying time trial between the years of 2020 and 2022 with an option for a fourth year, the event will take place in mid February.

Thoroughbred horse studs

The town is now well known for its Thoroughbred studs and stables, which have produced many champion horses in the sports of racing and show jumping. Cambridge is popularly known as the 'equine capital' of New Zealand. Internationally known thoroughbred studs in the area include:

- Cambridge Stud
- Chequers Stud
- Blue Gum Lodge
- Trelawney Stud
- Windsor Park Stud

Rowing

Lake Karapiro, recognised as one of the premium rowing lakes in the world, is close by, producing several world rowing champions, notably Rob Waddell, Robbie Manson, the Evers-Swindell twins, Georgina and Caroline, Mahé Drysdale and James Dallinger. The 2010 World Rowing Championships were held at Lake Karapiro.

Rugby union

Cambridge is home to two clubs, Hautapu Sports Club, founded in 1903, and Leamington Rugby Sports Club, founded in 1897.

Football

Cambridge is home to Cambridge FC who were the 2017 and 2015 Waikato Bay of Plenty Premiership champions, and Waipa Sports Club of the Year in 2014 and 2015.

== Events ==
Cambridge and the surrounding district is host to many sporting, cultural and trade events. More than 120,000 visitors attend the National Agricultural Fieldays every year at the Mystery Creek Events Centre between Cambridge and Hamilton.

Every summer, Lake Karapiro hosts the Waka Ama Sprint National Championships and the hydroplane racing as part of the New Zealand Grand Prix Circuit. In February, the Keyte Watson Polo Tournament takes place at Leamington, Cambridge. Every March, Cambridge holds its four-day Autumn Festival and in December, a Christmas Festival (including a town parade) takes place.

Cambridge's local annual event is the Battle of the Bridges, a rugby and netball competition between the two sports clubs in Cambridge, Leamington and Hautapu, however the trophy is awarded to the winning team in the rugby match. The event takes place in August each year. The first ever match between the two sides, in 2013, ended in a 0–0 draw.

== Media ==
Cambridge also has two local newspapers, the Cambridge News and the Cambridge Edition.

The 2025 New Zealand comedy film The Tavern was predominantly filmed in Cambridge, including at the former Masonic Hotel, and premiered at the town's Tivoli Cinema.

== Education ==
Cambridge High School is the town's co-educational state secondary school for Year 9 to 13 students, with a roll of 1,757 as of July 2026. It opened in 1883 as Cambridge District High School. Cambridge Middle School is the town's intermediate school for Year 7 to 10 students, with a roll of 595. It began in 1923 as a second site for Cambridge District High School.

The town has three state primary schools for Year 1 to 6 students: Cambridge East School, established in 1955, with a roll of 355; Cambridge Primary School, established in 1866, with a roll of 408; Leamington School, established in 1880, with a roll of 488.

Cambridge also has two non-state schools with similar names. St. Peter's School is a co-educational Anglican private (independent) school for Year 7 to 13 students, established in 1936, with a roll of 1,215. St Peter's Catholic School is a co-educational Roman Catholic integrated primary school for Year 1 to 8 students, with a roll of 196.

== Notable residents ==
Past or present residents include:

- Kylie Bax, model and actress
- Hamish Bond, MNZM, rower, Olympic gold medallist
- Kenny Cresswell, member of 1982 All Whites (football)
- Members of the Datsuns rock band
- Mahé Drysdale, MNZM, rower, Olympic gold medallist
- Katie Duncan, international footballer and Olympian
- Matthew Dunham, World Champion silver medallist in rowing
- Angus Fogg, racing driver
- Juliette Haigh, World Champion gold medallist in rowing
- Nikki Hamblin, middle distance runner and winner of Fair Play Award at 2016 Summer Olympics
- Ricki Herbert, CNZM, former coach of New Zealand All Whites and international footballer
- Sir Patrick Hogan KNZM, CBE, horse breeder
- Nikita Howarth, paralympic swimmer and gold medallist
- Luke Jacobson, rugby union player and All Black
- Mitch Jacobson, rugby union player
- Billy T. James, MBE, entertainer and comedian
- Spencer Jones, rugby union player
- Sir Vaughan Jones, Fields Medal winner
- Joelle King, squash player
- Regan King, rugby union player
- Eric Murray, MNZM, rower, Olympic gold medallist
- Dick Myers, All Black (played for Leamington RFC)
- Ritchie Pickett, country music singer/songwriter
- Cameron Roigard, rugby union player
- Ken Rutherford, MNZM, international cricketer and horse racing club manager
- Wayne Smith, CNZM, All Black and assistant coach of World Cup winning All Blacks in 2011 and 2015
- Joel Tobeck, actor
- Sarah Walker, Olympic silver medallist in BMX
- Sir Mark Todd, equestrian double Olympic gold medallist
- Sarah Ulmer, World Champion and Olympic gold medallist cyclist
- Rob Waddell, Olympic gold medallist in rowing
- Chris Wood, international footballer and All Whites captain

Cambridge was also the birthplace of All Black Sir Colin Meads KNZM MBE; George Albert Tuck (1884–1981), a notable New Zealand builder, soldier and diarist; artist Frances Irwin Hunt 1890–1981) and educationalist Blanche Eleanor Carnachan, MBE, (1871–1954).
