= Victoria Bridge, Cambridge, New Zealand =

New Zealand bridge

Victoria Bridge
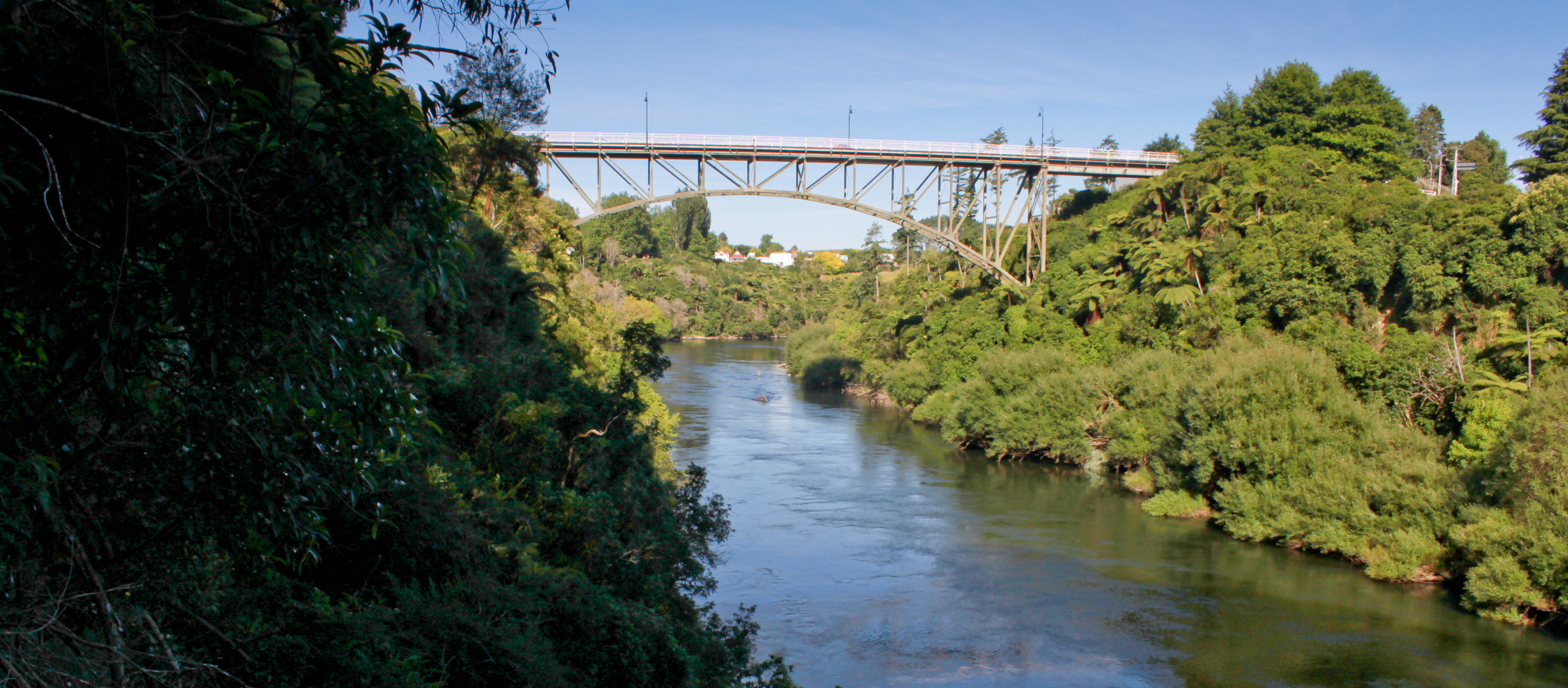
- Coordinates: 37°53′58″S 175°28′27″E
- Carries: Motor vehicles
- Crosses: Waikato River
- Owner: Waipā District Council
- Heritage status

Heritage New Zealand – Category 1
- Designated: 21 September 1989
- Reference no.: 4159
- Preceded by: Fergusson Bridge
- Followed by: The Narrows Bridge

Characteristics
- Total length: 141 metres (463 ft)
- Height: 35.4 metres (116 ft)

History
- Construction start: May 1907
- Opened: 21 December 1907

Location
- Interactive map of Victoria Bridge

Victoria Bridge, also called the High-level Bridge, is a hinged braced arch bridge in New Zealand, linking Cambridge with Leamington (developed after the bridge opened) and spanning the Waikato River.

== Design ==
The bridge stretches 462 ft (141 m), including a 290 ft (88 m) central arch, is 17 ft (5.2 m) wide and has over 330 tons of steel and 20,000 rivets. The original specification was increased by the government engineer, Peter Seton Hay, adding 15 tons of steel and about 60% more to the concrete pillars, which were made from local and imported cement, Te Kuiti limestone and Cambridge sand.

The classification of the design has been disputed. The heritage listing describes it as a cantilever bridge, which was also used in some contemporary descriptions. Possibly the confusion arose from a change of plan; the engineer, James Edward Fulton, wrote that an arch had been substituted for the original cantilever design. Others involved with the bridge were John Alexander Low Waddell, as consultant, G. M. Fraser, contractor, and S. W. Jones as resident engineer.

The arch has three hinges, allowing it to be built by cantilevering from each bank, whilst anchored to the pillars, until it was complete and the anchors could be slackened to allow the hinges to put the weight on the arch. This avoided the need for support from below, which might have been prone to flood damage.

== Origins and cost ==
The bridge scheme evolved over several years. In 1899 C W Hursthouse looked at the options, a 1901 meeting selected the present site and, after visits in 1902 and 1903 by Liberal MP, Sir Joseph Ward, who opened the Sanatorium at Maungakawa, government agreed to contribute. In March 1906 the components were ordered from American Bridge Co for £5078. A year later, the contract was let to G M Fraser for £5692 Building commenced in May 1907 and the bridge was opened by the Governor, Lord Plunket, on 21 December 1907. The £13,814 cost of the bridge was covered by £3,000 from government, with the rest shared by Cambridge Borough Council (30%), Pukekura Road Board (30%), Piako County Council (15%), Waipa County Council (15%) and Waikato County Council, (10%).

== Opening ==
The bridge was opened by the Governor, Lord Plunket, on 21 December 1907. He arrived by special train from Auckland, his carriage was escorted through the main streets by the army and there were large crowds, streamers and the town band.

== Earlier Cambridge bridges ==
Originally the only connection between the two places was by punt. Then the first bridge was built in 1870/71 by the armed constabulary for £1,500. It was near river level, with some piers in the river. It was destroyed by a massive flood at 7.40 pm on 10 December 1875, as reported in the Waikato Times of 11 December, and the story told in full on the paper of 14 December. It was replaced by the Red Bridge in 1876 spanning the river upstream. That was a wooden truss girder bridge, 143 feet long and 14 feet wide, which cost £2345 and was 12 feet above the level of the 1870 bridge. but an undated photograph suggests one of the early bridges may have been on the site of the present Victoria Bridge. The shaky state of the Red Bridge prompted the building of Victoria Bridge. Red Bridge was demolished in 1909.

== Today ==
The Victoria Bridge continues to be used by light motor vehicles, cyclists and pedestrians. The bridge is restricted to vehicles under 3,000 kg (6,600 lb) gross weight, 3.0 m (9.8 ft) high and 2.1 m (6 ft 11 in) wide. The speed limit on the bridge is 30 km/h (19 mph). Larger and heavier vehicles use the Fergusson Bridge 500 m (1,600 ft) upstream.
