= Fergusson Bridge =

Concrete bridge in Cambridge, New Zealand

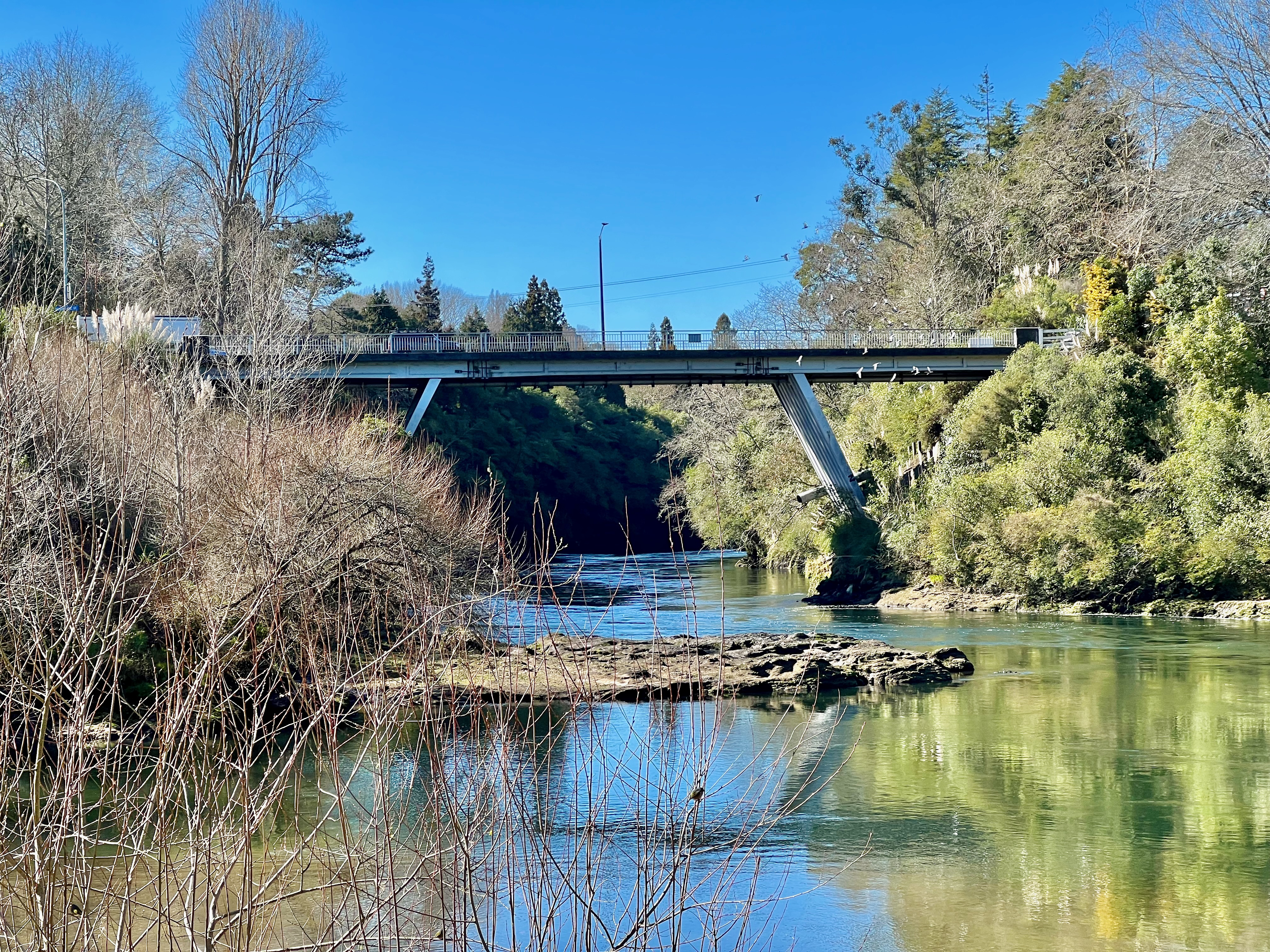
- Fergusson Bridge from the west
- Coordinates: 37.89504°S 175.479684°E
- Carries: Motor vehicles
- Crosses: Waikato River
- Owner: Waipā District Council
- Preceded by: Karapiro dam
- Followed by: Victoria Bridge

Characteristics
- Total length: 50 metres (160 ft)

History
- Opened: 1964

Location
- Interactive map of Fergusson Bridge

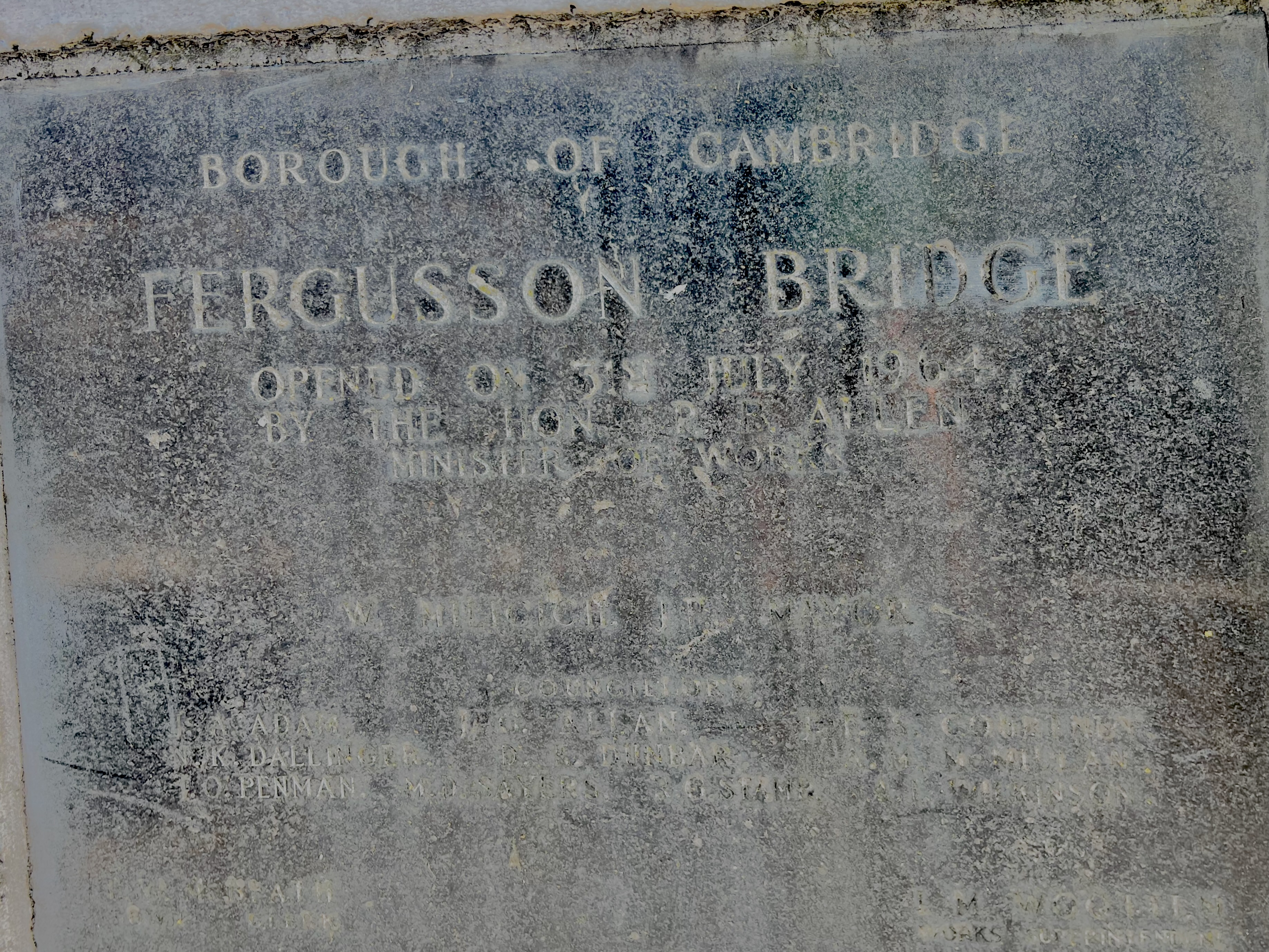
The faded plaque says the bridge was opened on 31 July 1964 by the Minister of Works, P B Allen, and lists the names of the mayor and councillors

Fergusson Bridge, also called the Low-level Bridge, is a pre-cast, prestressed concrete bridge in Cambridge, New Zealand, spanning the Waikato River. It was designed by North, Swarbrick, Mills & Westwood, cost £41,000 and opened in 1964. It was named after Governor-General Sir Bernard Fergusson.

The bridge is on the site of the original 1870 bridge and the 1876 Red Bridge.
