= The Tavern (film) =

2025 New Zealand comedy film

- Theatrical release poster
- Directed by: Brad Jackson
- Written by: Matt Hicks, Penny Boyce, Brad Jackson
- Produced by: Matt Hicks
- Starring: Matt Hicks, Narina Riddle, Josh McKenzie, Tom Easden, Ryan Jackson, Dan Sage, Stuart Shacklock
- Cinematography: Jared Jones
- Edited by: Guillaume Arnoulet
- Music by: Jacob Blair Tait
- Production company: The Tavern Film Limited
- Release date: 21 May 2025
- Running time: 101 minutes
- Country: New Zealand
- Language: English

The Tavern is a 2025 comedy film from New Zealand. Directed by Brad Jackson and written by Penny Boyce, Matt Hicks and Jackson, it was produced by and stars Hicks. The film is set in Cambridge, New Zealand and centres on a group of friends attempting to save their local tavern from being sold to a property developer. The film was shot predominantly in Cambridge and received a limited New Zealand theatrical release in May 2025.

== Cast ==
- Matt Hicks as Matt
- Narina Riddle as Kelly
- Josh McKenzie as Vick Preston
- Tom Easden as Tomo
- Ryan Jackson as Jacko
- Dan Sage as Keitz
- Stuart Shacklock as Jeremy
- Phill Palmer as Phil
- Kylah Carree as Jamie-Lee
- Mick Innes as the Bar Rat
- Andrew Lyall as Chris the Lawyer
- Ben Lummis as himself
- Zac Guildford as himself

The film also features cameo appearances from New Zealand sporting and racing personalities, including Ricki Herbert, Brendon Leonard, Dwayne Sweeney and jockeys Danielle Johnson, Matt Cameron, Michael McNabb, Vinny Colgan and Troy Harris.

== Production ==
Hicks said the film was inspired by his experiences growing up in Cambridge and a desire to represent provincial New Zealand on screen. The screenplay was developed with Brad Jackson and Penny Boyce. Production on The Tavern began in Cambridge in August 2019.

The cast combines professional actors with performers from the Waikato acting community. Josh McKenzie and Mick Innes appear alongside Matt Hicks and the film's principal ensemble. The film also features appearances by several New Zealand sporting and entertainment figures, including Zac Guildford, Ricki Herbert, Ben Lummis and George Simon. Filming began on 30 August. Approximately 90 percent of the film was shot in Cambridge; additional filming took place in Hamilton and Te Aroha.

== Release ==
The Tavern premiered at the Tivoli Cinema in Cambridge. The initial week-long run sold out, prompting additional screenings in other cinemas across New Zealand.

The film also featured a fictional beer brand named Piss, which became part of its promotional campaign. As part of the film's promotional campaign, the filmmakers initially announced that The Tavern would not screen in Auckland, playing on the film's rural-versus-Auckland theme. The campaign later included a comedy skit featuring broadcaster Mikey Havoc as the "Mayor of Auckland", who "kidnapped" the filmmakers and demanded that the film be brought to the city. The film subsequently screened in Auckland at the Capitol Cinema on Dominion Road. The film was later picked up by TVNZ's free‑to‑air platform.

== Reception ==
Graeme Tuckett of The Post gave The Tavern three and a half stars out of five. He described the film as "a bit amateurish and rough around the edges", but also described it as a "labour of love". Tuckett also singled out Mick Innes' appearance as the Bar Rat as the film's emotional heart.

Brianna Stewart of the Whakatāne Beacon gave the film eight out of ten, describing it as a nostalgic portrayal of run-down pubs and praising its "authentic Waikato humour".

Mike Mather of the Waikato Times described The Tavern as "a cult classic in the making" and characterised it as "cheeky, offensive, and unmistakably Kiwi".
