= Peggy Spicer =

New Zealand artist (1908–1984)

- Born: Mary Margaret Gore Spicer; 1908; Parnell, Auckland, New Zealand
- Died: 1984 (aged 75–76); Auckland, New Zealand
- Education: Elam School of Fine Art
- Known for: Painting

Mary Margaret Gore Spicer (1908–1984) was a New Zealand artist.

== Education ==
Spicer was educated at Chilton Saint James School in Lower Hutt, New Zealand, and Diocesan School for Girls in Auckland. She then trained at the Elam School of Fine Arts and was influenced by the teaching of John Weeks, though she was not taught by him directly.

== Career ==
Spicer worked in watercolours, often painting landscapes and life in small towns of New Zealand. She was a contemporary of Rena Manson, Ida Eise, and Bessie Christie.

After her studies, Spicer traveled to England and Egypt with her mother, Ella Spicer, also an artist. During their travels they both exhibited in Cairo.

Spicer exhibited with several New Zealand art associations including:

- Auckland Society of Arts
- Canterbury Society of Arts
- New Zealand Academy of Fine Arts
- Rutland Group
- Auckland Fellowship of Artists

In 1963 she was awarded the Kelliher Art Prize (second place).

Her work is held at the Waihi Arts Centre and Museum Association.
