= Frances Irwin Hunt =

New Zealand artist

Frances Irwin Hunt (26 July 1890 – 25 August 1981) was a New Zealand artist. She was born in Cambridge, Waikato, New Zealand on 26 July 1890.
