= John Leech Gallery =

Art dealer and gallery in Auckland, New Zealand

The John Leech Gallery is New Zealand's oldest existing art dealer gallery. It was established in Auckland in August 1855.

The gallery was founded by Manchester-born immigrant John Leech. It was initially located in High Street and had several short term locations until settling in Shortland Street in 1866, a site it held until 1963.

Upon John's death in 1879, the business passed into the hands of his son Harold, who ran it until his on death in 1945. The gallery was then bought by Allan Swinton, Gilbert Meadows and Howard Newcomb, with Swinton later owning the gallery outright. In 1963 he oversaw the move of the gallery to Lorne Street. This served as the gallery's home until the building as marked for demolition in the 1970s. The gallery moved to Albert Street.

Swinton sold the gallery in the 1970s. Under the ownership of Murray and Beverley Gow and business partner Bill Hart the gallery opened a second branch with the purchase of premises in Remuera. This later became the John Leech Gallery's main home after the lease expired on the Albert Street property in 1986.

Murray and Beverley's son John Gow became the gallery's manager, and in 2001 the gallery moved to Kitchener Street, close to its original home in the central city. Gow was also co-owner of the Gow Langsford Gallery, and the two complementary galleries operate from the same building.
