= Archie Fisher (painter) =

British painter

Archibald Joseph Charles Fisher (15 June 1896 – 7 November 1959) was an artist born in Dudley, England who was educated at the Royal College of Art, London who came to New Zealand to take up the post of principal of Elam Art School in 1924 and was instrumental in having Elam recognised as an integral part of the University of Auckland in 1950.
