= Ida Eise =

New Zealand artist and art teacher (1891–1978)

Ida Gertrude Eise MBE (9 September 1891 – 7 March 1978) was a New Zealand artist and art teacher. She was born in Auckland, New Zealand, on 9 September 1891. She was a student of Edward Fristrom and painted in an impressionistic style. She taught at the Elam School of Fine Arts and New Plymouth Technical College. As an artist, she was known as an interpreter of the Northland outdoors. Her awards included the Bledisloe Medal in 1936 and 1949. Her works are held in the Auckland Art Gallery and in the Museum of New Zealand Te Papa Tongarewa.

In the 1976 Queen's Birthday Honours, Eise was appointed a Member of the Order of the British Empire, for services to art.
