= 2012 in New Zealand =

- Decades: 1990s; 2000s; 2010s; 2020s
- See also: History of New Zealand; List of years in New Zealand; Timeline of New Zealand history

The following lists events that happened during 2012 in New Zealand.

== Population ==
- Estimated population as of 31 December: 4,425,900.
- Increase since 31 December 2011: 26,400 (0.60%).
- Males per 100 Females: 95.7.

== Incumbents ==
=== Regal and vice-regal ===
- Head of State – Elizabeth II
- Governor-General – Jerry Mateparae
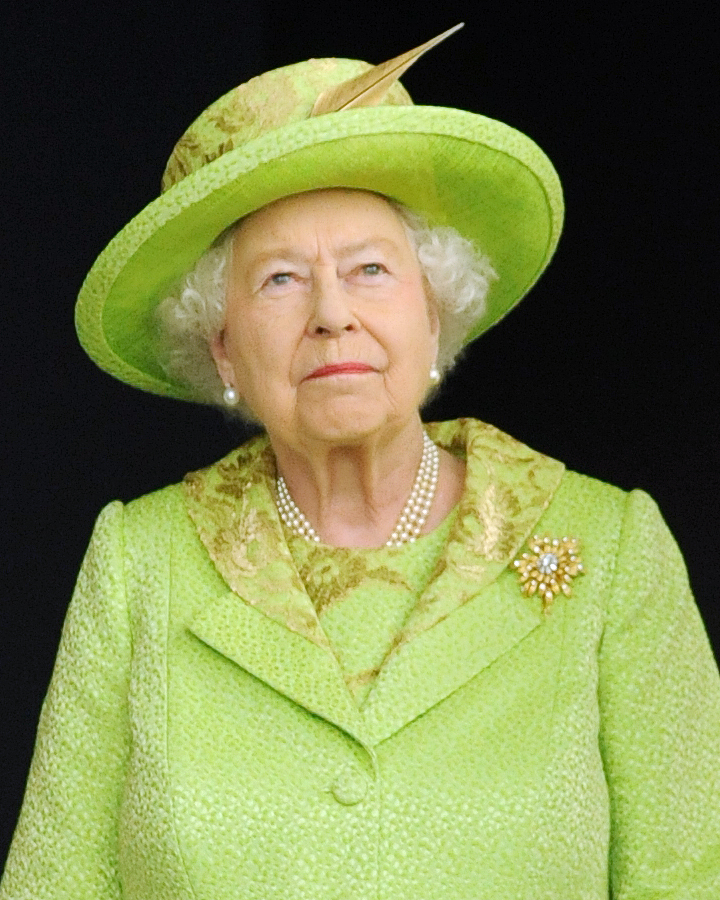
Elizabeth II

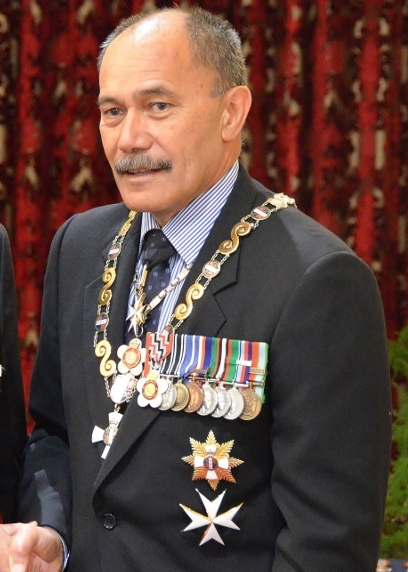
Jerry Mateparae

=== Government ===
2012 is the first full year of the 50th Parliament, which first sat on 20 December 2011 and will dissolve on 17 December 2014 if not dissolved prior. The Fifth National Government, first elected in 2008, continues.

- Speaker of the House – Lockwood Smith
- Prime Minister – John Key
- Deputy Prime Minister – Bill English
- Leader of the House – Gerry Brownlee
- Minister of Finance – Bill English
- Minister of Foreign Affairs – Murray McCully
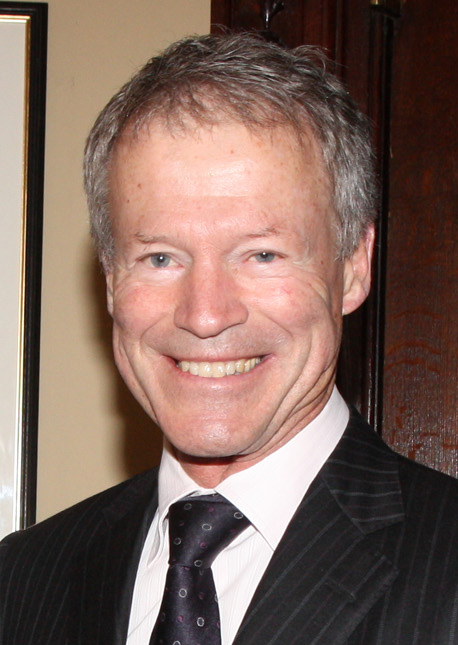
Lockwood Smith

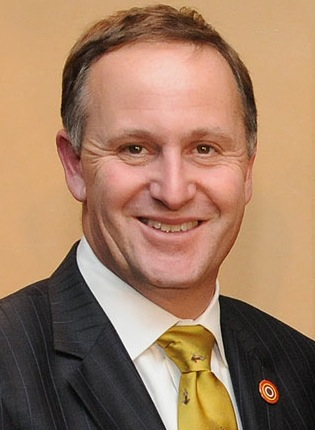
John Key

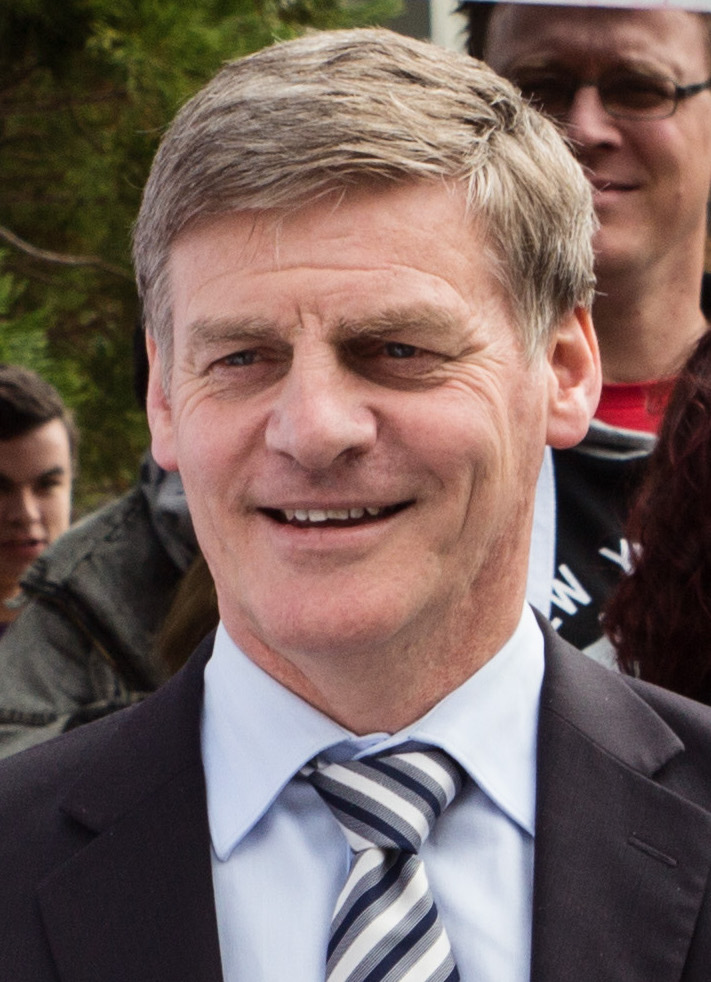
Bill English

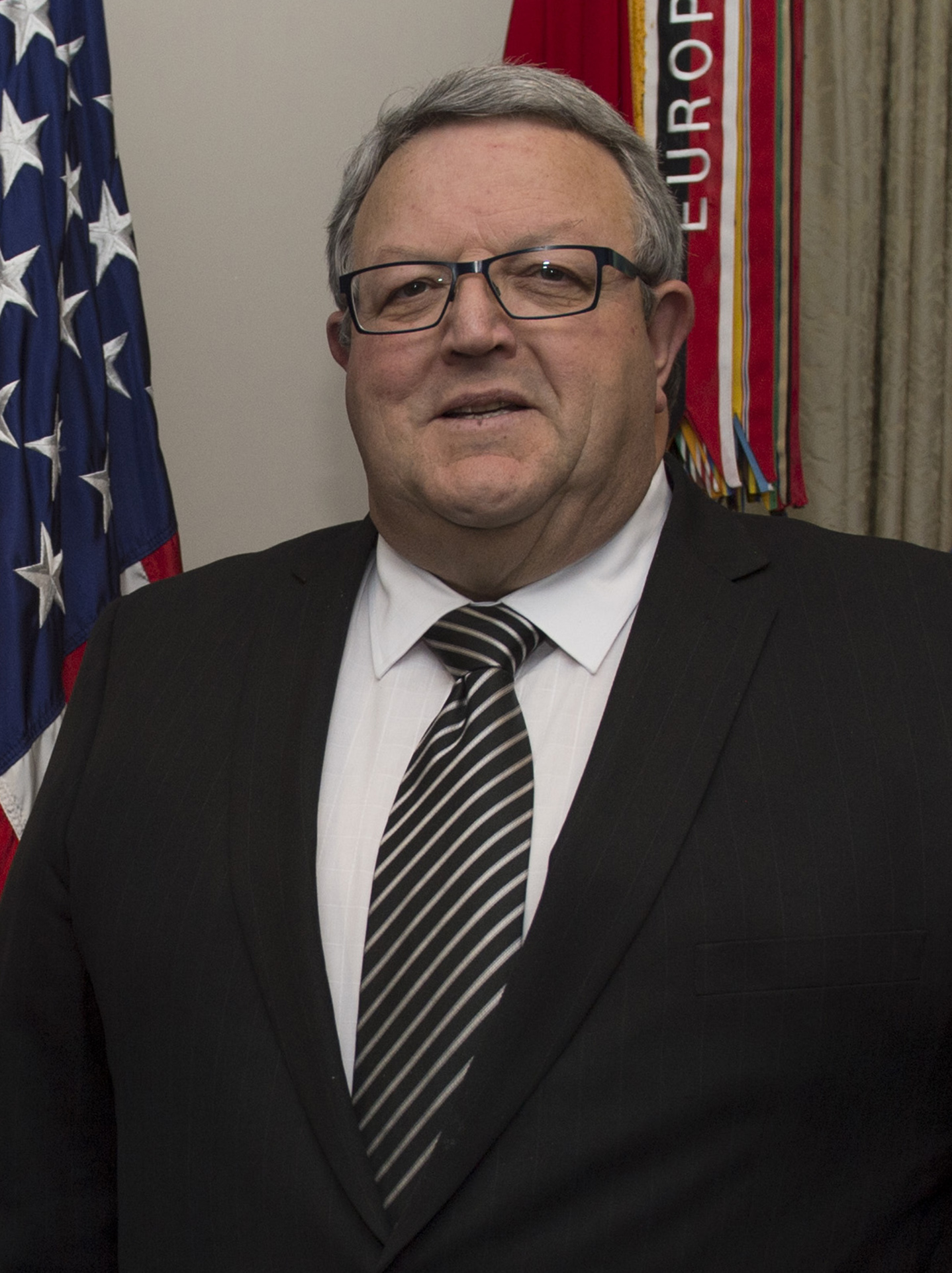
Gerry Brownlee

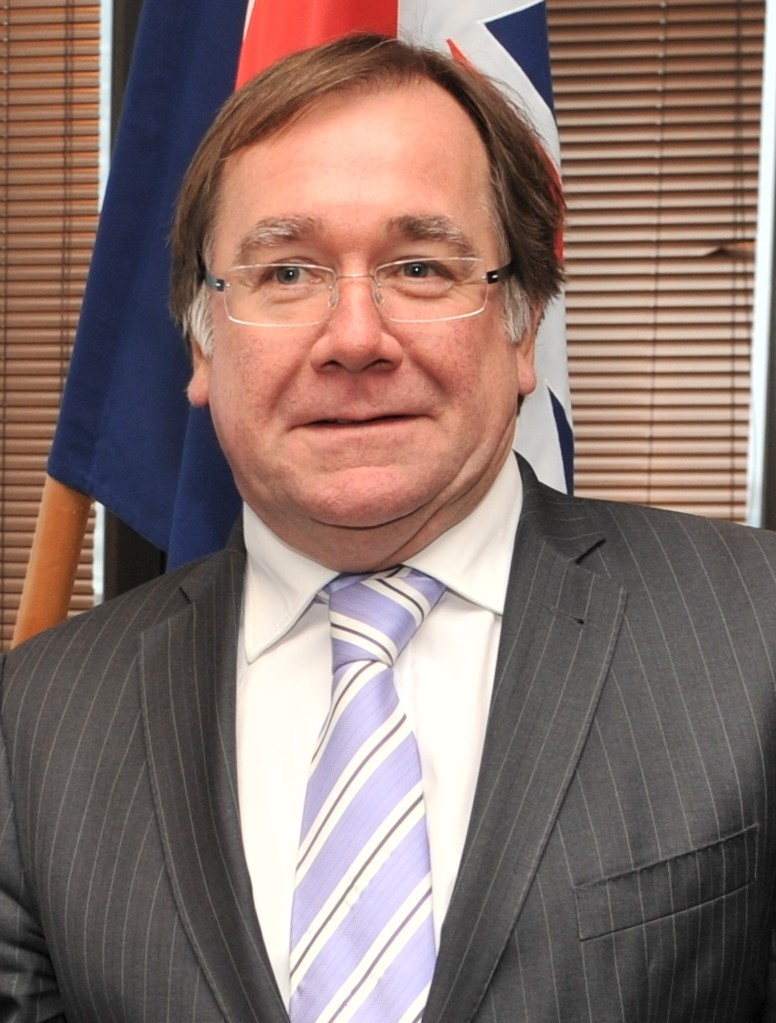
Murray McCully

=== Other Party leaders ===
- Labour – David Shearer (Leader of the Opposition)
- Green – Russel Norman and Metiria Turei
- New Zealand First – Winston Peters
- Māori Party – Pita Sharples and Tariana Turia
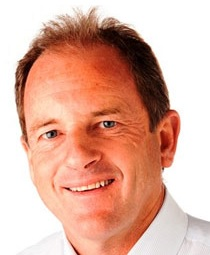
David Shearer

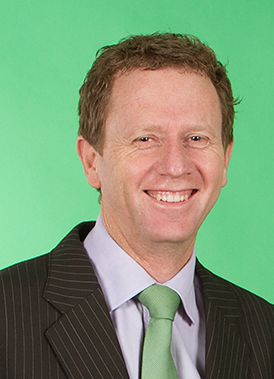
Russel Norman

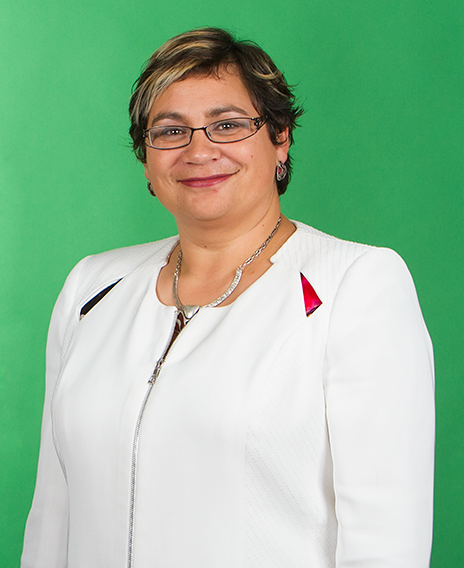
Metiria Turei

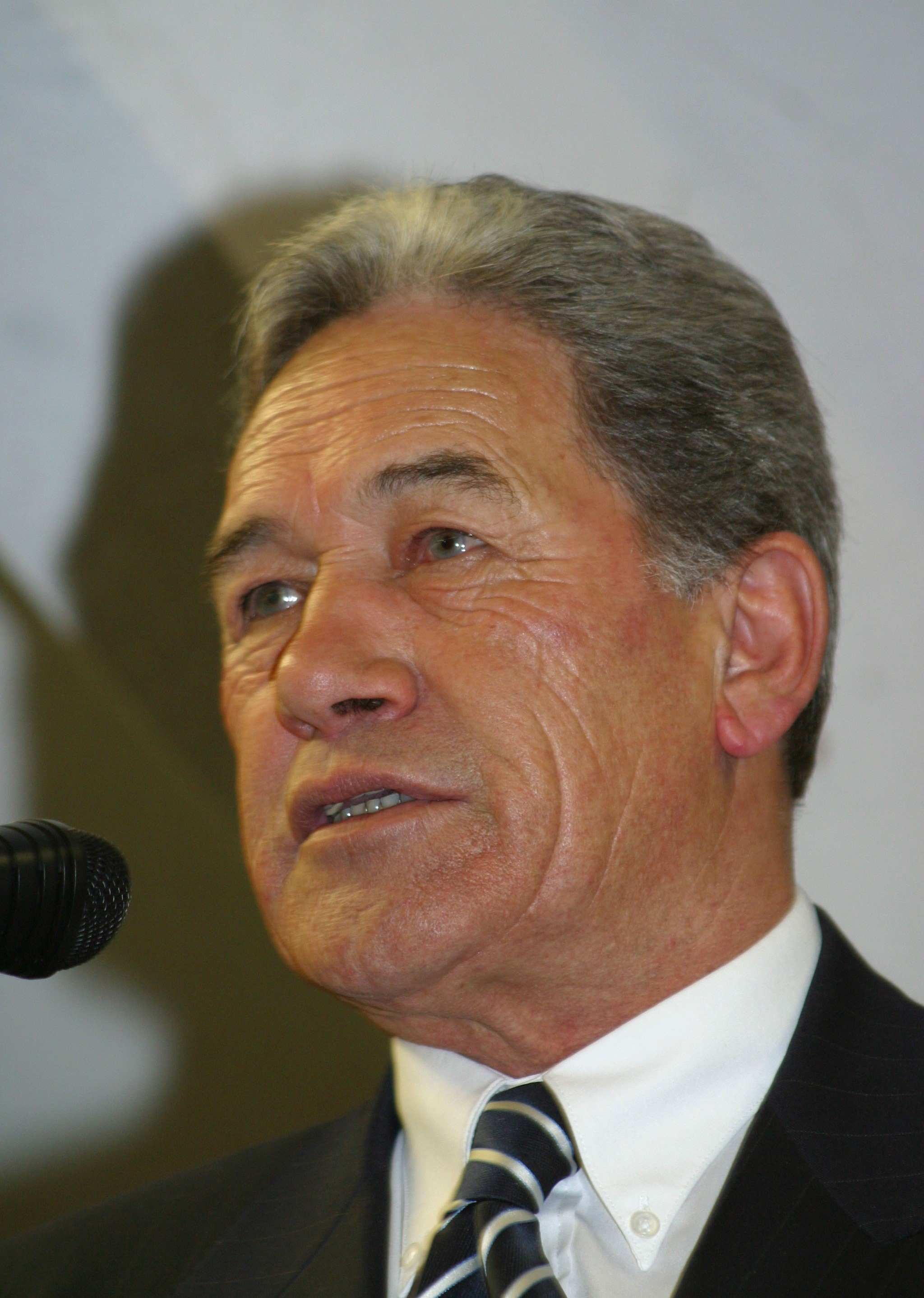
Winston Peters

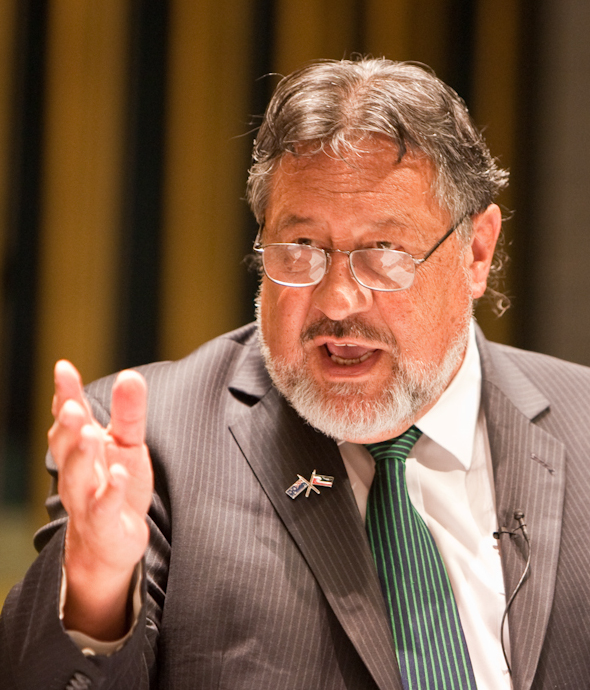
Pita Sharples

=== Judiciary ===
- Chief Justice – Sian Elias
- President of the Court of Appeal – Mark O'Regan
- Chief High Court judge – Helen Winkelmann
- Chief District Court judge – Jan-Marie Doogue
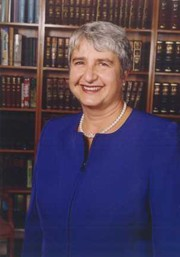
Sian Elias

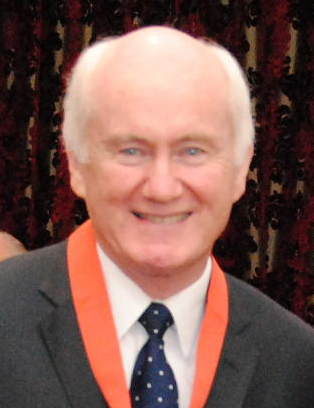
Mark O'Regan

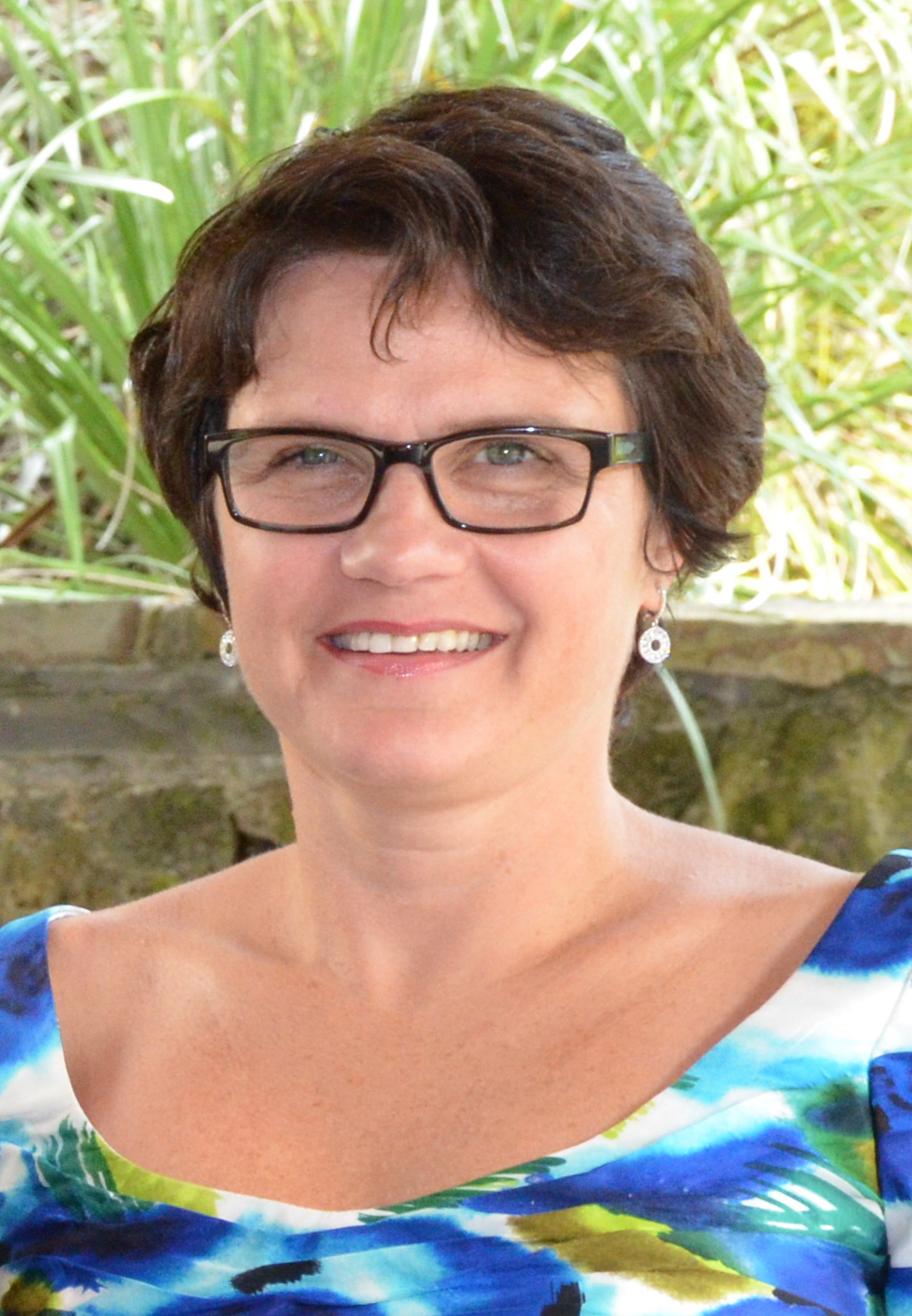
Helen Winkelmann

=== Main centre leaders ===
- Mayor of Auckland – Len Brown
- Mayor of Tauranga – Stuart Crosby
- Mayor of Hamilton -Julie Hardaker
- Mayor of Wellington – Celia Wade-Brown
- Mayor of Christchurch – Bob Parker
- Mayor of Dunedin – Dave Cull
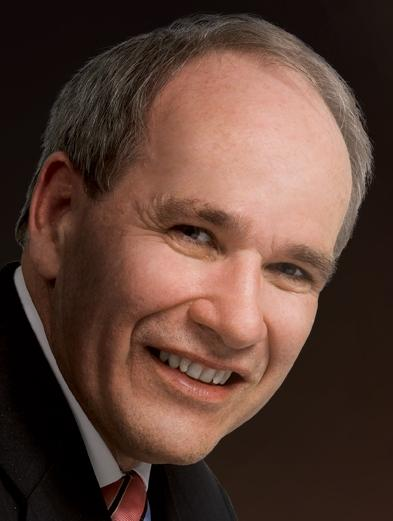
Len Brown

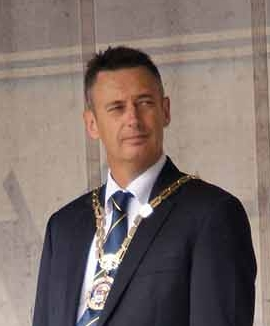
Stuart Crosby

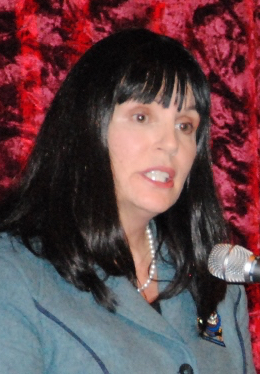
Julie Hardaker

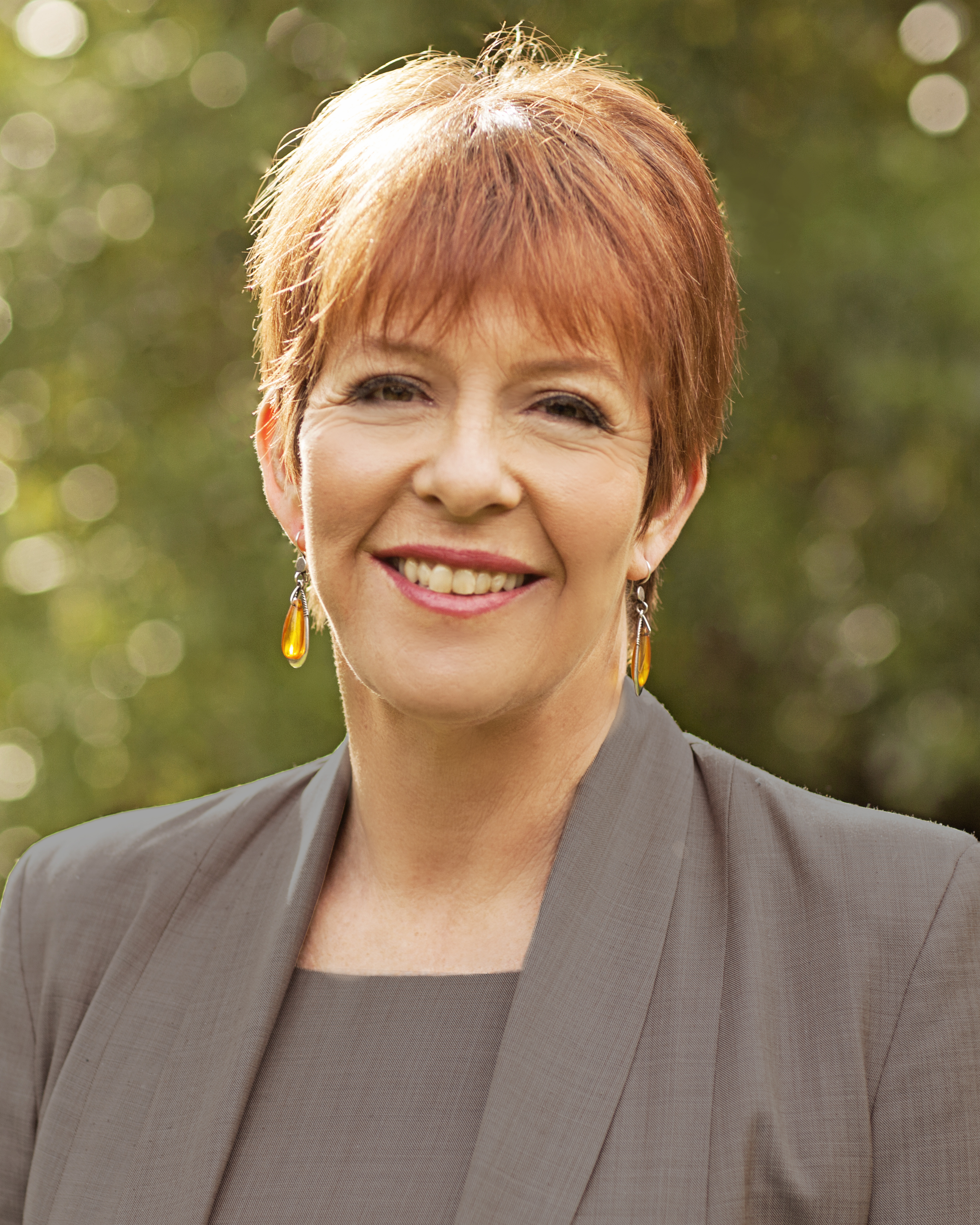
Celia Wade-Brown

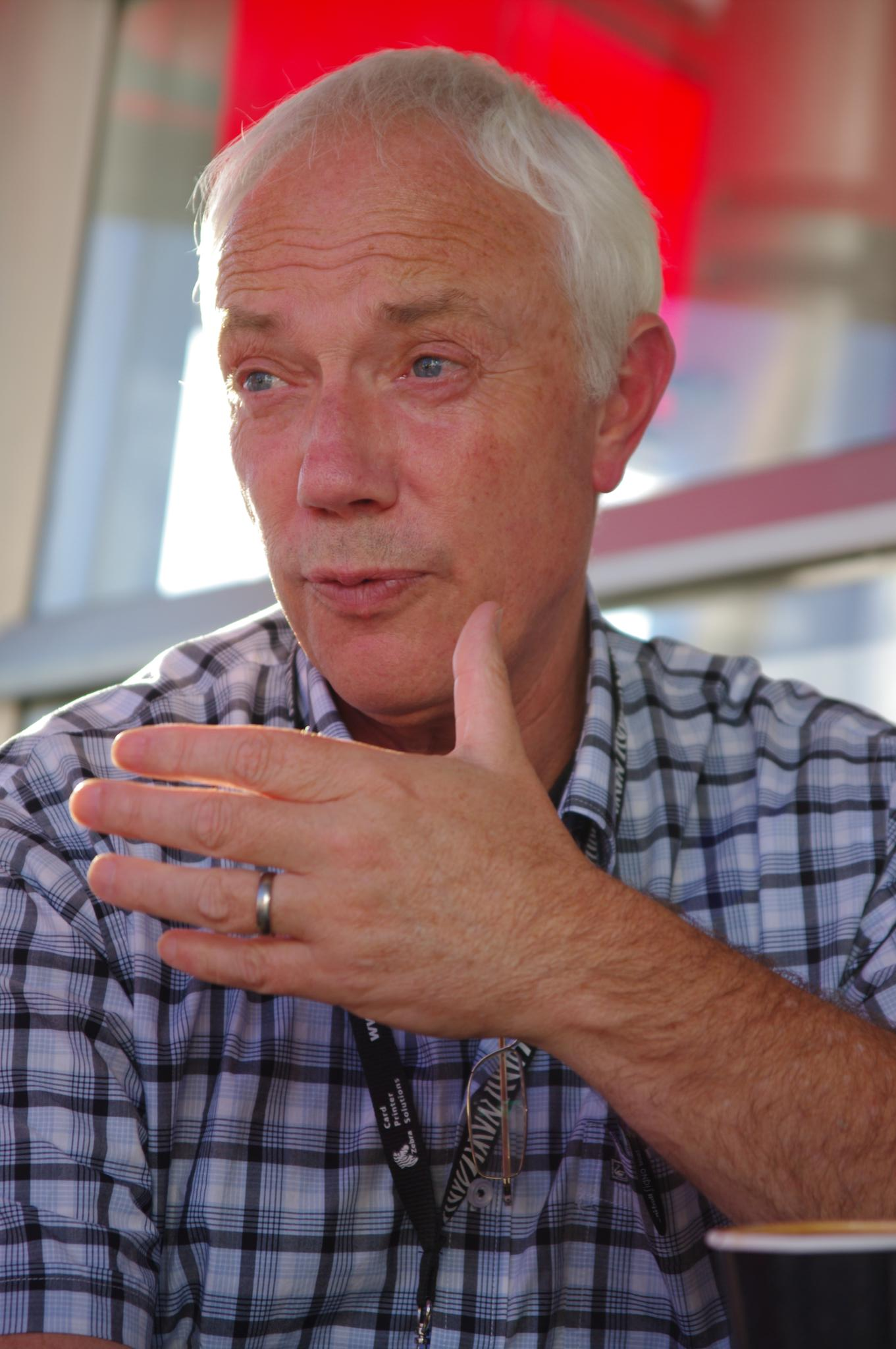
Bob Parker

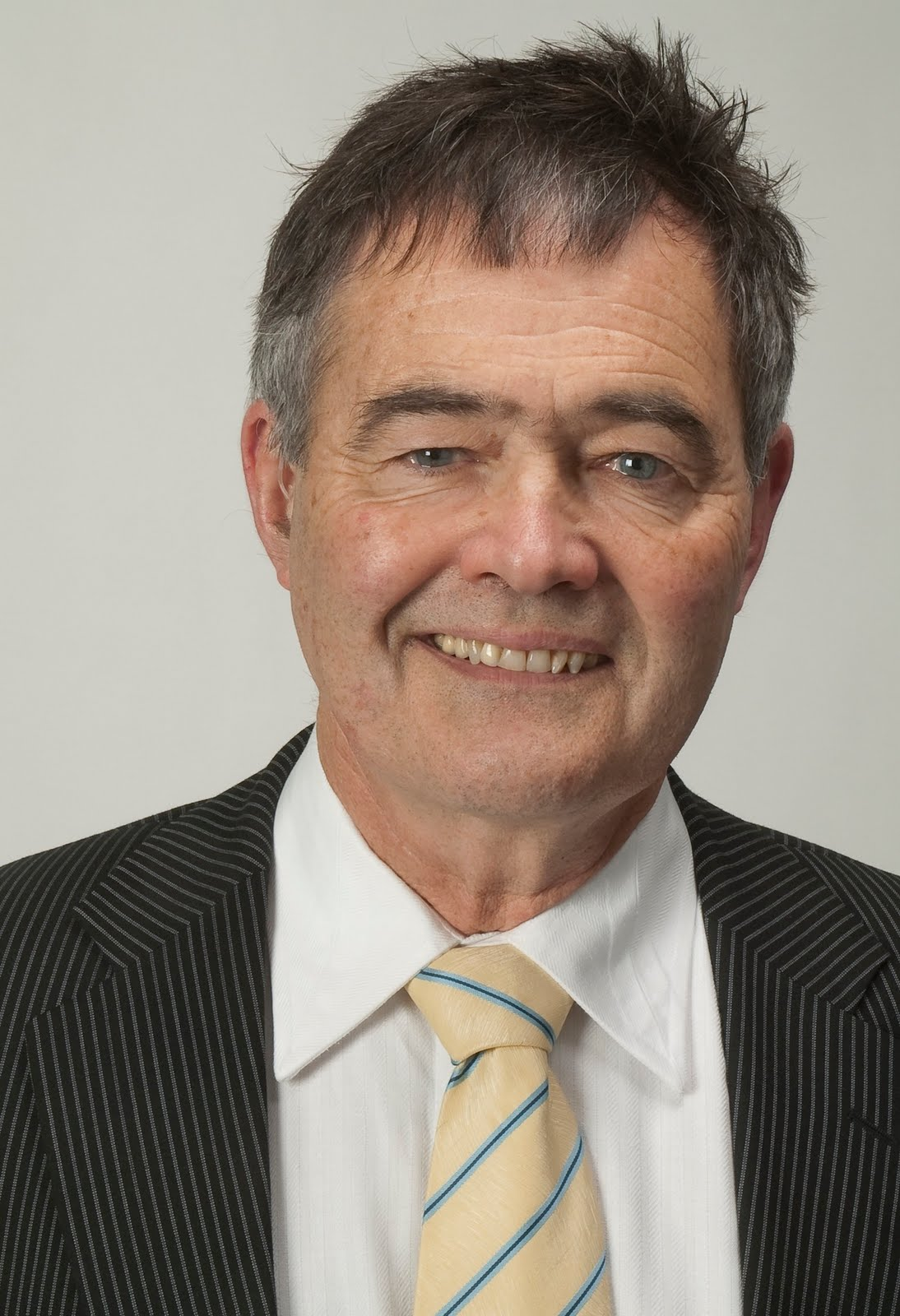
Dave Cull

== Events ==
=== January ===
- 7 January – A hot air balloon crashes near Carterton in the Wairarapa, killing all eleven on board.
- 10 January – The stern section of the MV Rena, grounded on a reef of the coast of Tauranga since October 2011, sinks after splitting from the bow section on 8 January, spilling cargo along the Bay of Plenty coast.
- 20 January – More than 70 police raid a $30 million mansion in Coatesville, north of Auckland, leased by Kim Dotcom, and arrest Dotcom and three others for internet piracy as part of the United States Department of Justice shut down of the file hosting site Megaupload.

=== February ===
- 6 February – Diamond Jubilee of Elizabeth II's accession as Queen of New Zealand
- 9 February – The Department of Building and Housing issues a report saying that the Canterbury Television (CTV) Building, which collapsed during the 2011 Christchurch earthquake killing 115 people, did not meet relevant building standards when it was built in 1986.
- 22 February – Thousands of people in Christchurch and across New Zealand commemorate the first anniversary of the 2011 Christchurch earthquake, which killed 185 people on 22 February 2011.

=== March ===
- 2 March – It is announced that the 131-year-old landmark Christ Church Cathedral will be demolished as a result of damage from the 2011 Christchurch earthquake and subsequent aftershocks.
- 19 March – "Marmageddon": It is announced by manufacturer Sanitarium that the sole production line of the popular breakfast spread Marmite, of which New Zealanders eat 640 tonnes annually, had stopped in November due to earthquake damage at the Papanui, Christchurch, factory, and the company's own stocks had run out. It would be February 2013 before production resumed.
- 25 March – The largest changes to the nation's road rules in 35 years sees two rules regarding priority at intersections change, including the unique left-turn verses right-turn rule.

=== April ===
- 10 April – For the first time since records began, the Easter weekend road toll period ends with no fatal road accidents.
- 21 April – A referendum is held in Nelson City and the Tasman District on whether the two councils should amalgamate. A majority of Nelson City vote for amalgamation, while the majority of Tasman District votes against amalgamation, resulting in the merger being rejected.
- 30 April – The Ministry for Primary Industries, a merger of the Ministry of Agriculture and Forestry, the Ministry of Fisheries and the New Zealand Food Safety Authority, comes into operation.

=== May ===
- 19 May – The remains of murder victim Jayne Furlong are found at Port Waikato, 19 years after she went missing in Auckland.
- 24 May – Finance Minister Bill English delivers the 2012 government budget, described for the second consecutive year as a "zero" budget. The National government aims to record a $197m surplus in 2014/15, down from $1300m in the 2011 budget.

=== June ===
All Blacks vs Ireland rugby test matches.

=== July ===
- 3 July – A magnitude 6.2 earthquake strikes off the Taranaki coast and is widely felt across the country. Only minor damage is reported to have occurred.
- 27 July – 12 August – 184 New Zealand athletes in sixteen sports compete at the 2012 Summer Olympics in London, England, achieving six gold, two silver and five bronze medals, including the nation's 100th Olympic medal.

=== August ===
- 5 August – The Radio Network House in Christchurch which was damaged beyond repair in the 2011 Christchurch earthquake is demolished by implosion, becoming the first building to be demolished this way in New Zealand.
- 6 August – Mount Tongariro in the central North Island erupts, spreading volcanic ash across the area and as far east as Hawke's Bay.
- 30 August – Members of Parliament votes on three options for the national legal drinking age – the existing 18 years, 20 years, or an 18 on-licence/20 off-licence split. After the 18/20 split was eliminated in the first round of voting, Parliament votes in the second round to keep the age at 18 years, with 68 votes in favour to 53.
- The payroll of 110,000 teachers and support staff in state and state-integrated schools is switched to the new Novopay system. The error-ridden system would ultimately cause thousands of pay errors, resulting in staff being overpaid, underpaid, or not paid at all, continuing into 2013.

=== September ===
- 10 September – Weekday editions of The New Zealand Herald cease publication in broadsheet format after 150 years, switching to a compact format.
- 26 September – The first New Zealand ShakeOut, a national earthquake drill, is held.
- 30 September – Hawke's Bay and West Coast become the first regions to complete digital television transition, when analogue television signals are switched off at 3:00 am.

=== November ===
- 5 November – The Royal Commission report into the Pike River Mine disaster of November 2010 is released, highlighting major health and safety flaws at the Pike River coal mine and New Zealand mines in general. Minister for Labour Kate Wilkinson subsequently resigns her portfolio.
- 10–16 November – Charles, Prince of Wales and Camilla, Duchess of Cornwall visit the country as part of the Queen's Diamond Jubilee.
- 12 November — The Royal Commission of Inquiry into Building Failure caused by Canterbury Earthquakes delivers its final report.

=== December ===
- 6 December – A tornado hits the suburb of Hobsonville in northwestern Auckland, causing widespread damage and killing three people.

=== Holidays and observances ===
- 6 February – Waitangi Day
- 25 April – Anzac Day
- 4 June – Queen's Birthday Monday
- 22 October – Labour Day

== Arts and literature ==
=== Performing Arts ===
- Benny Award presented by the Variety Artists Club of New Zealand to Marian Burns.

=== Television ===
- C4 to be renamed FOUR

=== Films ===
- COMPOUND (horror film)
- Ghost TV
- Sione's 2: Unfinished Business (sequel to Sione's Wedding, 2006)
- The Hobbit: An Unexpected Journey (fantasy film)
- The Red House (drama)

== Sport ==
=== Events ===
- 22 July – Waikato Bay of Plenty Magic win the 2012 ANZ Championship netball final against Melbourne Vixens by 41–38 in Melbourne, becoming the first New Zealand team to win the trans-Tasman competition since its inauguration in 2008.
- 27 July – The 2012 Summer Olympics opens in London, United Kingdom. New Zealand sends a delegation of 184 athletes, competing in sixteen sports.
- 2 August – 2012 Summer Olympics: Nathan Cohen and Joseph Sullivan claim the gold medal in the men's double sculls
- 3 August – 2012 Summer Olympics
  - Hamish Bond and Eric Murray claim the gold medal in the men's pair
  - Mahé Drysdale claims the gold medal in the men's single sculls
- 4 August – The Hamilton-based Chiefs win the 2012 Super Rugby final against the Sharks by 37–6 in Hamilton, claiming their first Super Rugby championship title.
- 10 August – 2012 Summer Olympics: Jo Aleh and Polly Powrie claim the gold medal in the women's 470 class
- 11 August – 2012 Summer Olympics: Lisa Carrington claims the gold medal in the women's K-1 200 metres.
- 12 August – The 2012 Summer Olympics closes, with New Zealand at the time claiming five gold medals, three silver medals, and five bronze medals.
- 13 August – Valerie Adams, who initially won the silver medal in the women's shot put, is awarded the gold medal after the initial gold medallist, Belarusian Nadzeya Ostapchuk, is stripped of her medal due to failing a drugs test. New Zealand's medal tally subsequently changes to six gold medals, two silver medals, and five bronze medals.
- 25 August – The All Blacks win the 2012 Bledisloe Cup after winning 22–0 over Australia in Auckland to secure two wins in the three game series. The win is New Zealand's tenth successive Bledisloe Cup win.
- 29 August – The 2012 Summer Paralympics opens in London, United Kingdom. New Zealand sends a delegation of 24 athletes, competing in seven sports.
- 30 August – 2012 Summer Paralympics: Sophie Pascoe claims the gold medal in the women's 200-metre individual medley SM10
- 1 September – 2012 Summer Paralympics: Sophie Pascoe claims the gold medal in the women's 100-metre butterfly S10
- 2 September – 2012 Summer Paralympics
  - Phillipa Gray, with pilot Laura Thompson, claims the gold medal in the women's individual pursuit B
  - Cameron Leslie claims the gold medal in the men's 150-metre individual medley SM4
- 6 September – 2012 Summer Paralympics: Sophie Pascoe claims the gold medal in the women's 100-metre freestyle S10
- 8 September – 2012 Summer Paralympics: Mary Fisher claims the gold medal in the women's 200-metre individual medley SM11
- 9 September – The 2012 Summer Olympics closes, with New Zealand claiming six gold medals, seven silver medals, and four bronze medals.
- 20 September – The New Zealand national netball team win the 2012 Constellation Cup, after winning 50–49 over Australia in Auckland to secure two wins in the three game series. The win is New Zealand's first Constellation Cup win since its inauguration in 2010, and New Zealand's first test series win over Australia since 2005.

=== Olympic Games ===
- New Zealand sends a team of 184 competitors across 16 sports.

Gold	Silver	Bronze	Total
6	2	5	13

=== Paralympics ===
- New Zealand sends a team of 24 competitors across seven sports.

Gold	Silver	Bronze	Total
6	7	4	17

=== Shooting ===
- Ballinger Belt – Brian Carter (Te Puke)

== Births ==
- 27 September – Beauty Generation, Thoroughbred racehorse
- 29 September – Tarzino, Thoroughbred racehorse
- 12 November – Lazarus, Standardbred racehorse
- 21 November – Etah James, Thoroughbred racehorse

== Deaths ==
=== January ===
- 4 January – Bruce Irwin, botanist (born 1921)
- 10 January – Harvey Kreyl, rugby league player (born 1925)
- 11 January – Ross Wightman, rugby union player (born 1929)
- 15 January – Ben Hana, aka "Blanket Man", vagrant (born 1957)
- 19 January – Sir Maurice Casey, jurist (born 1923)
- 30 January – Mary Yandall, singer (born c.1949)

=== February ===
- 7 February – Peter Goddard, educationalist (born 1931)
- 10 February – Lloyd Morrison, businessman (Infratil) (born 1957)
- 13 February – Trevor Davey, politician (born 1926)
- 14 February – Howard Hutchinson, association footballer (born 1921)
- 16 February
  - Joy Lamason, cricketer (born 1915)
  - Robin Startup, philatelist (born 1933)
- 18 February – Peter Sharp, cricketer, cricket commentator (born 1939)
- 23 February
  - Cathy Campbell, broadcaster (born c.1962)
  - Athol Whimp, mountaineer (born 1961)

=== March ===
- 5 March – Paul Haines, writer (born 1970)
- 7 March – Andrew Pullan, mathematician (born 1963)
- 10 March – Richard White, rugby union player (born 1925)
- 13 March – Jock Hobbs, rugby union player and administrator (born 1960)
- 17 March – Ngaire Thomas, author (born 1943)
- 24 March – Sir Paul Callaghan, physicist (born 1947)
- 25 March
  - Tony Gordon, rugby league player and coach (born c.1948)
  - Ainsley Iggo, neurophysiologist (born 1924)
- 28 March
  - Ralph Maxwell, politician, Member of Parliament (1978–90) (born 1934)
  - Jan Nigro, artist (born 1919)
- 29 March – Hone Kaa, Anglican church leader, social justice campaigner and broadcaster (born 1941)
- 31 March – Judith Adams, politician (born 1943)

=== April ===
- 5 April – Sir Peter Tapsell, politician, Member of Parliament (1981–96), Speaker of the House (1993–96) (born 1930)
- 10 April – Michael Green, diplomat (born c.1946)
- 11 April – Grant Tilly, actor (born 1937)
- 15 April – Peter McKenzie, conservationist (born 1952)
- 28 April – Sir Fred Allen, rugby union player, former All Black captain (1949) and coach (1966–68) (born 1920)
- 30 April – Les Hunter, politician (born 1927)

=== May ===
- 1 May – Arnold Wilson, artist (born 1928)
- 3 May – Richie Thomson, cyclist (born 1940)
- 6 May – John Worrall, cricketer (born 1927)
- 12 May – Frank Bethwaite, pilot, boat designer (born 1920)
- 13 May – Trevor Young, politician, Member of Parliament (1968–90) (born 1925)
- 17 May – Derek Round, journalist (born 1935)
- 19 May – Phil Lamason, WWII RNZAF pilot (born 1918)
- 21 May – Kevin Barry, rugby league player (born 1950)
- 31 May – Dorothy Manning, artist (born 1919)

=== June ===
- 3 June
  - Hugh Poole, Olympic sailor (1976) (born 1924)
  - Sir Brian Talboys, politician, Member of Parliament (1957–81), Deputy Prime Minister (1975–81) (born 1921)
- 8 June – Jane Evans, painter (born 1946)
- 10 June – Kenneth Clark, ceramicist (born 1922)
- 4 June – Peter Beaven, architect (born 1925)
- 8 June – Charles Pearce, mathematician (born 1940)
- 17 June – John McEldowney, rugby union player (born 1947)

=== July ===
- 1 July – Alister McLellan, mathematician and physicist (born 1919)
- 2 July – Jeff Leigh, cricketer (born 1950)
- 7 July – David Baldwin, lawn bowls player (born 1921)
- 18 July
  - Aston Greathead, painter (born 1921)
  - Stuart Jones, golfer (born 1925)
- 21 July – Vida Stout, limnographer and academic administrator (born 1930)
- 23 July – Margaret Mahy, children's author (born 1936)
- 27 July – Pauline Thompson, artist (born 1942)
- 28 July – Colin Horsley, classical pianist and music teacher (born 1920)
- 30 July – Jonathan Hardy, actor, screenwriter and movie director (born 1940)
- 31 July
  - Jean Puketapu, Māori language activist, kōhanga reo pioneer (born 1931)
  - Reg Williams, Anglican priest (born 1914)

=== August ===
- 3 August – Mama Tere Strickland, transgender advocate, politician (born 1963)
- 6 August – Gregor Yeates, soil zoologist and ecologist (born 1944)
- 11 August – Roger Sandall, anthropologist (born 1933)
- 16 August – Evon Dickson, cricketer (born 1934)
- 23 August – Col Campbell, television and radio gardening presenter (born 1933)
- 29 August – Jeremy Pope, lawyer and activist (born 1938)
- 30 August – Bill Kini, boxer, Commonwealth Games gold medallist (1966) (born 1937)

=== September ===
- 8 September – Leigh Hamilton, actress (born 1949)
- 14 September
  - Don Binney, painter (born 1940)
  - Dame Joy Drayton, teacher, politician (born 1916)
- 15 September – Paul Okesene, rugby league player (born 1967)
- 20 September – Sir John Wallace, jurist (born 1934)

=== October ===
- 12 October – Bob Aynsley, rugby league player (born 1922)
- 15 October – Margaret Alington, historian (born 1920)
- 18 October – Florence Akins, artist (born 1906)
- 22 October – Sir Wilson Whineray, rugby union player and businessman (born 1935)
- 24 October – Phil Bygrave, field hockey player (born 1929)
- 25 October – Roger Gibbs, swimmer (born 1932)
- 29 October – Valerie Davies, arachnologist (born 1920)
- 31 October – June, Lady Blundell, community activist and charity patron, viceregal consort (born 1922)

=== November ===
- 2 November
  - Annette Baier, philosopher (born 1929)
  - Greg King, lawyer (born 1969)
- 3 November – Marie Bell, educationalist, lecturer, teacher (born 1922)
- 7 November – Glenys Page, cricketer (b. 1940)
- 16 November
  - Stuart Babbage, Anglican priest (born 1916)
  - Bob Scott, rugby union player (born 1921)
- 19 November – Jim Weir, diplomat (born 1922)
- 23 November – Diana, Lady Isaac, environmentalist and arts patron (born 1921)
- 26 November – Vincent Orange, historian (born 1935)

=== December ===
- 1 December – Marcia Russell, journalist and news presenter (born 1940)
- 3 December – Eileen Moran, visual effects producer (born 1952)
- 5 December – Geoffrey Clatworthy, community activist (born 1939)
- 13 December – Rob Talbot, politician, Member of Parliament (1966–1987) (born 1923)
- 16 December – George Duggan, Marist priest (born 1912)
- 22 December – Gerald Melling, architect (born 1943)
- 24 December
  - Guy Dodson, biochemist (born 1937)
  - Elwyn Richardson, educator (born 1925)
- 27 December – Peter Anderson, cricketer (born 1950)
- 30 December – Mike Hopkins, sound editor (The Lord of the Rings: The Two Towers, Transformers) (born 1959)

== See also ==
- List of years in New Zealand
- Timeline of New Zealand history
- History of New Zealand
- Military history of New Zealand
- Timeline of the New Zealand environment
- Timeline of New Zealand's links with Antarctica
