= A Māori Figure in a Kaitaka Cloak =

Public sculpture in New Zealand

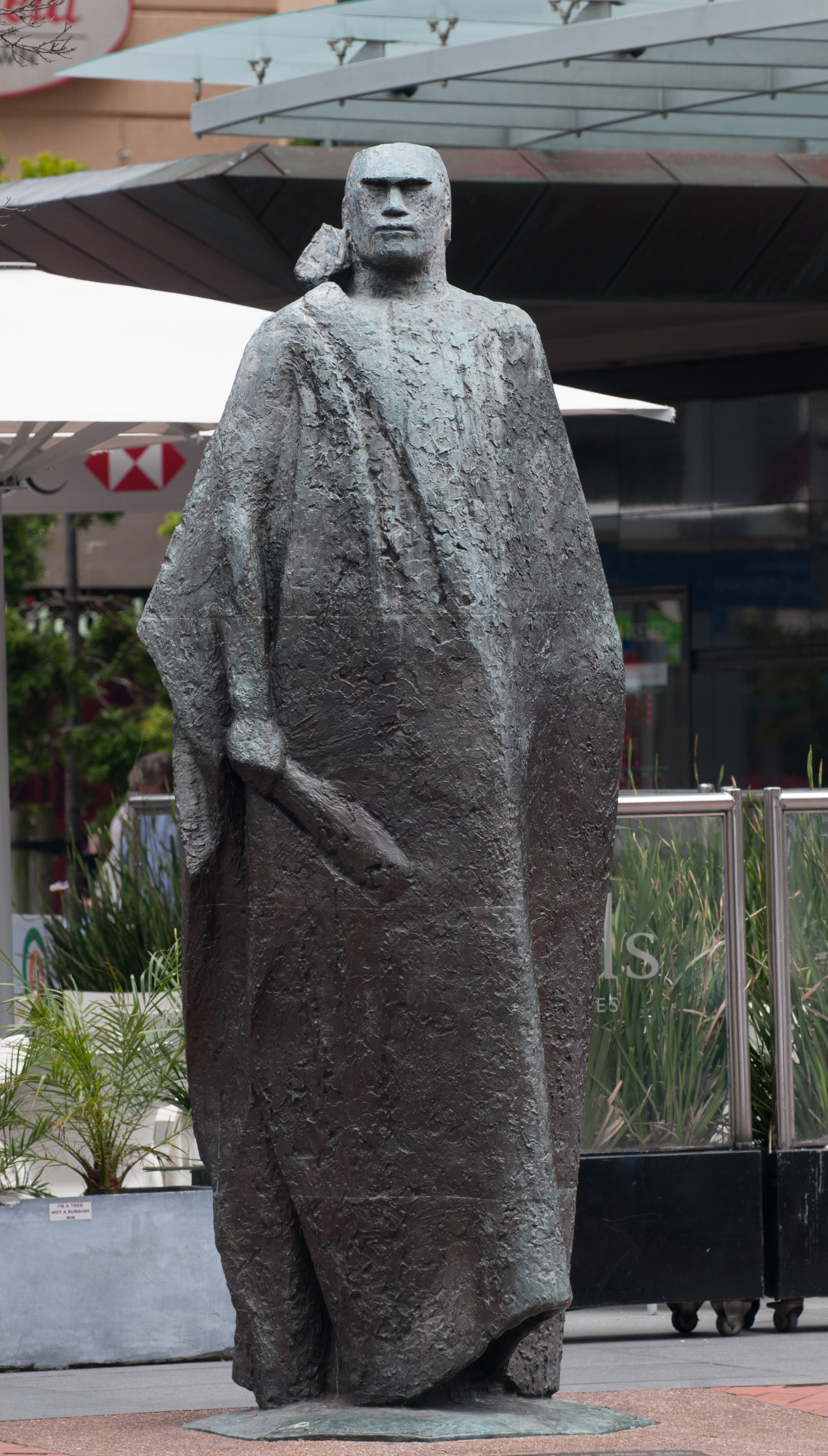
- A Māori Figure in a Kaitaka Cloak photographed in 2012
- Interactive map of A Māori Figure in a Kaitaka Cloak
- Location: Quay Street, Auckland, New Zealand
- Coordinates: 36°50′36″S 174°46′02″E
- Designer: Molly Macalister
- Material: Bronze
- Opening date: 1967

A Māori Figure in a Kaitaka Cloak (formerly known as Maori Warrior), by Molly Macalister is a bronze sculpture located on Quay Street, across from the Auckland Ferry Terminal in New Zealand. It was the first public art commission awarded to a woman in New Zealand to receive, and was unveiled in June 1967.

== Background ==
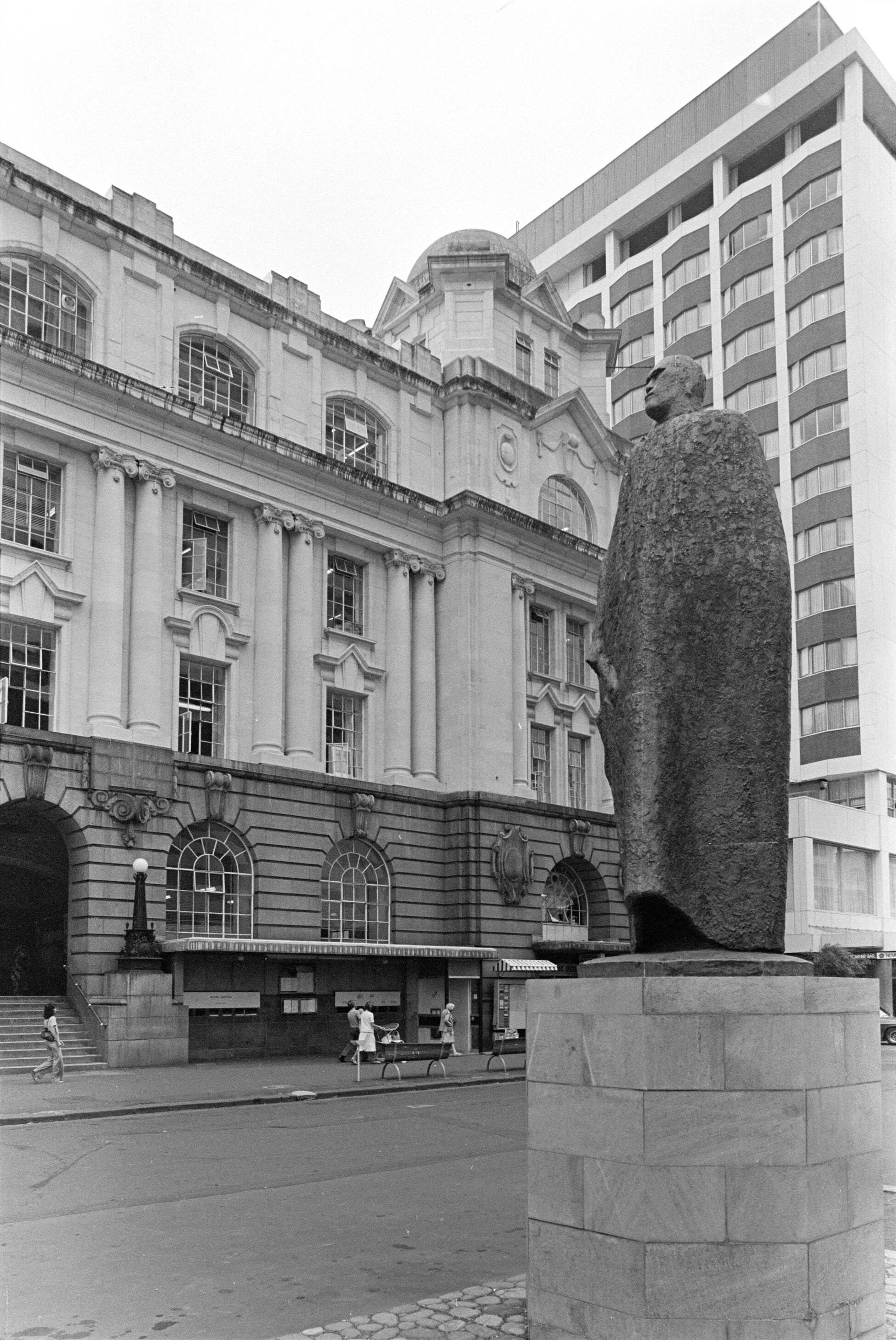
A Māori Figure in a Kaitaka Cloak photographed in 1977, in its original position on top of a stone pedestal opposite the Chief Post Office

In 1964, the Auckland City Council commissioned Macalister to create a bronze sculpture depicting "a Māori figure in a traditional form." This made Molly Macalister the first woman in New Zealand who was commissioned to create a public sculpture.

While artists typically worked independently on commissioned pieces at the time, Macalister collaborated closely with local iwi Ngāti Whātua Ōrākei, who supported the final design. It was highly uncommon then for an artist to consult with elders and incorporate the iwi's wishes into the final piece.

Macalister created the sculpture as a symbolic figure to welcome visitors arriving in New Zealand by boat. It was originally positioned in front of the Chief Post Office

== Design and composition ==
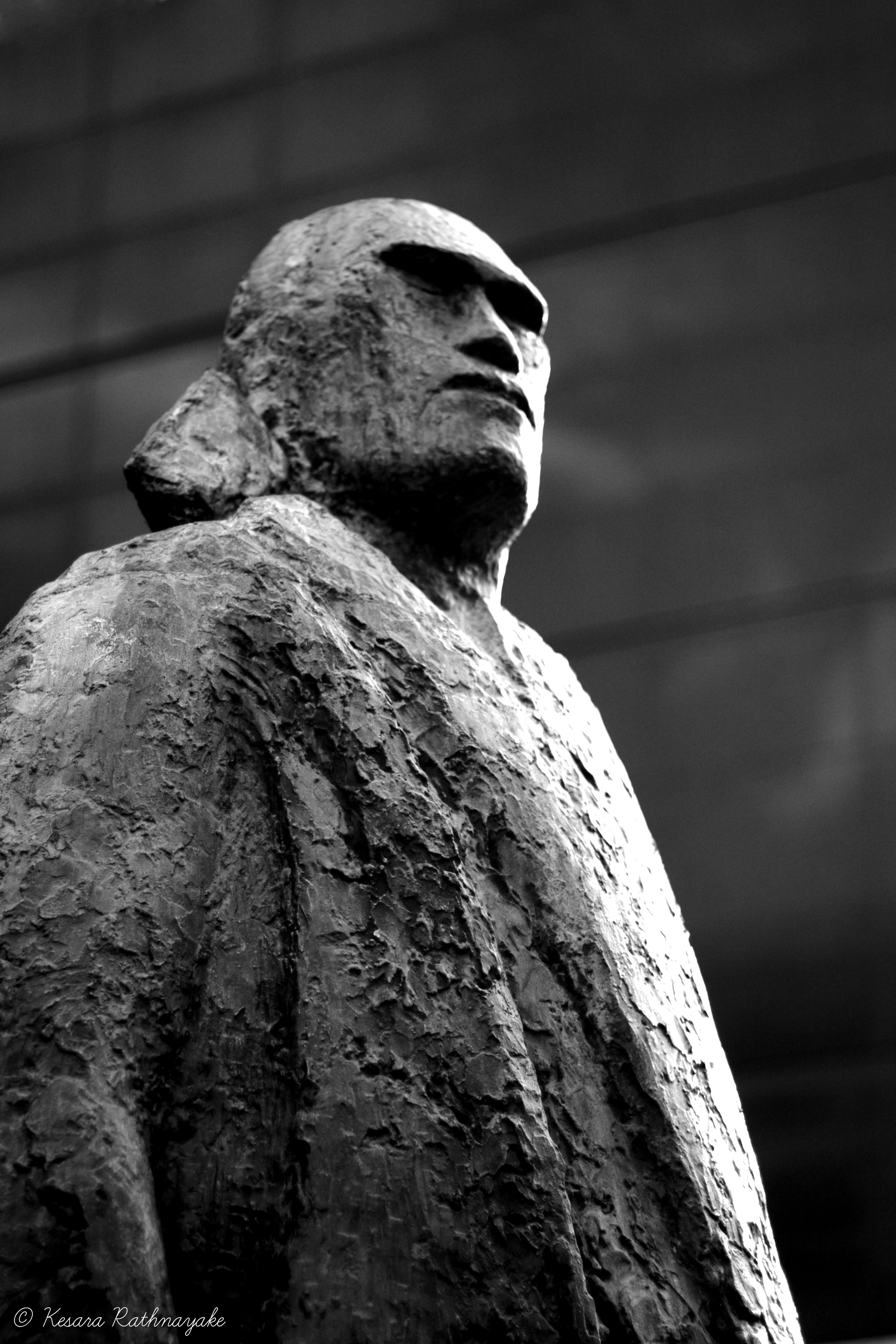
A close-up of the sculpture's bust

A Māori Figure in a Kaitaka Cloak stands at 3 m (9.8 ft) tall and is cast in bronze, with nearly a ton of plaster used in the casting process. The figure wears a kaitaka (traditional flax cloak) and holds a mere (short, flat weapon) lowered at his side, indicating peace.

To construct the sculpture, Macalister build a framework of reinforced steel rods. She had to set up a temporary studio covered in clear vinyl film at the back of her Takapuna home in order to safely store and work on the figure. Once completed, a foundry moulder encased the plaster statue in a mould for casting. Macalister cast the figure in bronze, and is one of the earliest public bronze sculptures that was able to be cast locally in New Zealand, undertaken at Ron Ranby's Designers Moulders Sculptors Foundry.

== History and controversy ==
Macalister spent two years developing the sculpture, drafting multiple preliminary sketches, pausing work due to debates over its design, and engaging in extensive consultations with Ngāti Whātua Ōrākei.

The first sketch that Macalister presented to the City Council depicted a warrior wearing a knee-length cloak, standing with feet apart in a commanding stance, and holding a taiaha (wooden spear) across his chest. However, she quickly decided a less stereotypical pose would be more respectful, significantly modifying the final design to reflect a more dignified, resolute pose. While today, Macalister is praised for conveying a deep respect for her subjects, shaping her sculptures to connote quiet power and strength, responses to her work at the time were not as favourable.

In 1965, work on the sculpture was temporarily halted due to an ongoing debate over the figure's pose. Some council members were in favour of a warrior delivering a speech on a marae, while others preferred a fighting stance, both ideas revealing the 'traditional attitude' of a Māori person that was typically portrayed at the time. At this point, some of these council members argued that Macalister had deviated from the original brief by omitting the warlike taiaha and choosing a more subdued, peaceful pose. As a result, legal opinions were sought over a two-month period.

After it was confirmed that Macalister was indeed satisfying her contract requirements, the sculpture's casting proceeded, and it was completed in 1966. However, when it was unveiled in 1967, it was met with further controversy - this time over its Modernist style. Some members of the public complained that the head was too small, and overall proportions too inaccurate.

Originally placed on a tall stone pedestal, in 1979 the statue was relocated to a lower pedestal, which art historian Michael Dunn saw as "diminish[ing] the intended effect of grandeur".

== Reception ==
Despite such criticism, others, including Macalister's contemporaries, supported the final design. Sculptor Alison Duff praised the bronze figure as a monument of simplicity and dignity that graces the gates of Auckland city. She also defended the Modernist approach, reminding audiences that realism is just one of many traditional fine art styles, and that Macalister's radical artistic style should be embraced.

Art historian Michael Dunn saw A Māori Figure in a Kaitaka Cloak as the culmination of Macalister's career, and felt that the piece was influenced by French sculptor Auguste Rodin's Monument to Balzac (1897) and likely by Italian sculptor's Giacomo Manzù's series of bronze cardinals, noting that A Māori Figure in a Kaitaka Cloak simplified the figure's facial features in a similar manner.
