= Molly Macalister =

New Zealand artist (1920–1979)

- Born: Molly Morell Macalister; 18 May 1920; Invercargill, New Zealand
- Died: 12 October 1979 (aged 59); Auckland, New Zealand
- Known for: Sculpture, painting, wood carving
- Notable work: Unknown Political Prisoner (1952), A Māori Figure in a Kaitaka Cloak (1964), Little bull (1967)
- Spouse: George Hajdu/Haydn

Molly Morell Macalister (18 May 1920 – 12 October 1979) was a New Zealand artist. She was the first female artist in New Zealand to be awarded with a major public art commission with her 1964 work A Māori Figure in a Kaitaka Cloak. Known for painting, woodcarving, and sculpture, her work is held in the collection of the Museum of New Zealand Te Papa Tongarewa.

== Early life ==
Macalister was born in Invercargill and was the daughter of Catherine Holmes McQueen and Morell Macalister, a partner in the law firm Macalister Brothers.

== Education ==
Macalister attended the Invercargill South School, Southland Girls’ High School, and the Chilton Saint James School in Lower Hutt. Her natural ability in drawing was noted as early as 1937.

In 1938 Macalister enrolled at the Canterbury College School of Art (now Ilam School of Fine Arts). Although initially interested in painting and drawing she was drawn to sculpture and the teachings of Francis Shurrock. She assisted Shurrock in his work for the Education Court at the 1939–40 New Zealand Centennial Exhibition, Wellington. In her final year she won the sculpture prize.

== Art ==
Macalister drew on modern materials such as concrete, and used modern processes such as bush carpentry, engineering and plumbing techniques, to create her sculptures.

Commissioned works by Macalister include A Māori Figure in a Kaitaka Cloak (1964–66) in Auckland's Queen Street, Little Bull (1967) in Hamilton Gardens, stone carvings for the ark in the former Auckland synagogue (1968), and a bust of John A. Lee for the Auckland Public Library (1967).

== Career ==
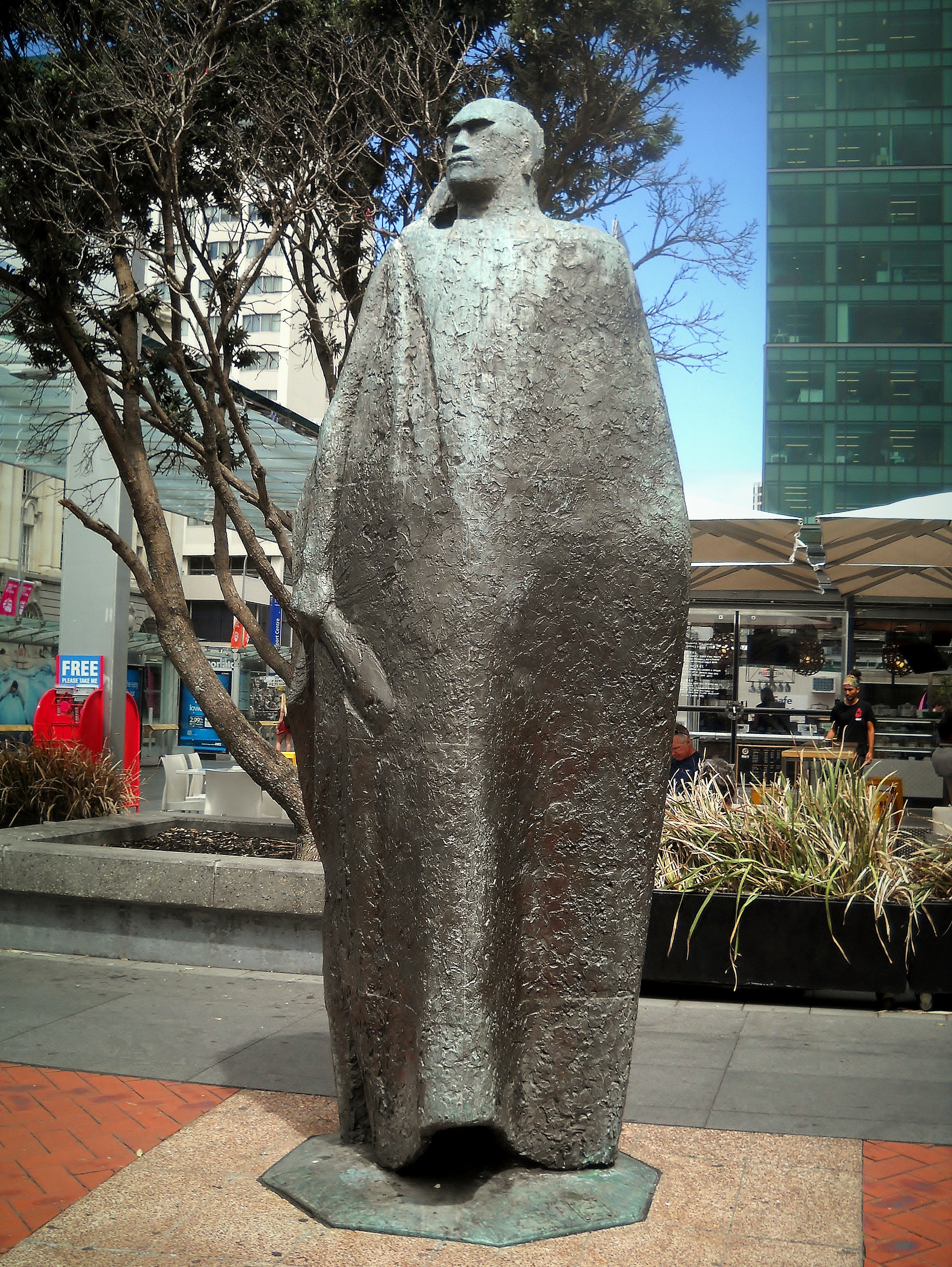
Macalister's sculpture "A Maori Figure in a Kaitaka Cloak" in Auckland

As a teenager Macalister won several awards from the Royal Drawing Society in London.

Between 1942 and 1943 she worked for the Otago University Museum, creating agricultural models and dioramas. From 1944 until 1949, and 1953, Macalister exhibited with the Auckland Society of Arts. She also exhibited with The Group in 1943 and 1968.

Macalister's works were included in the first exhibition of contemporary New Zealand sculpture held at Auckland City Gallery in 1955. Four years later, her work featured again, this time alongside Anne Severs and Alison Duff.

Macalister was a founding member of the New Zealand Society of Sculptors and Associates and was made honorary life member from 1979. She played a key role in the 1971 international sculpture symposium in Auckland.

== Personal life ==
Macalister moved to Auckland in 1943. She married George Hajdu (later known as Haydn) in Dunedin on 14 August 1945. They had one son.
