= Anne Severs =

- Born: July 10, 1931; Hamstead Marshall, Berkshire
- Died: January 4, 2026 (aged 94); Niagara-on-the-Lake, Ontario
- Occupation: Sculptor
- Notable work: The Prisoner

Margaret Anne Tremain née Severs (10 July 1931 – 4 January 2026) was a British-born New Zealand artist. Her works are held in the collection of Auckland Art Gallery.

== Biography ==
Severs was born to Gertrude and Carl Severs in Hamstead Marshall (Berkshire) in 1931. Her father Carl was a naval commander, and served as a Naval Attaché to Bletchley Park during World War II.

After the war, Severs attended the Bath Academy of Art for training in sculpture, where she studied under Kenneth Armitage and Bernard Meadows. Severs is credited with showing Meadows how to work directly with plasters for bronze while at the Bath Academy of Art (Corsham).

She received an Italian Government scholarship, and studied with the renowned sculptor Marino Marini at the Accademia di Belle Arti in Milan, where she met Ronald Tremain, a New Zealand composer and musician also in Italy on a scholarship.

Severs and Tremain married in Lacock, Wiltshire in 1957, and moved around as their family grew, living in New Zealand, the UK and the US.

In 1959, Severs had an exhibition at the Auckland City Art Gallery alongside fellow sculptors Molly Macalister and Alison Duff. Severs inspired Molly Macalister's shift from wood carving to modelling in clay and plaster.

Severs taught art to both adults and children over the course of her career.

In 1970, Severs and Tremain moved to Canada, and settled in Niagara-on-the-Lake, Ontario where they lived until Tremain's death in 2022, and Severs' death in 2026.

== Exhibitions ==
Three Auckland Sculptors: Alison Duff, Anne Severs and Molly Macalister, Auckland City Art Gallery, 1959.

Ambiguous Images, Figures, Boxes, The Gallery, Brock Centre for the Arts, Ontario, 1983.
