= Tutill =

Tutill is a surname. Notable people with the surname include:

- Doris Tutill (1916–2010), New Zealand artist and Anglican priest
- Steve Tutill (born 1969), English professional footballer

== See also ==
- Murder of Roy Tutill
- Tuttle (surname)
