= Chrystabel Aitken =

New Zealand artist (1904–2005)

Chrystabel Laurene McArthur
- Born: Chrystabel Laurene Aitken; 1904; Waikaka, Southland, New Zealand
- Died: 15 January 2005 (aged 100–101)
- Known for: sculpture, jewellery, metalwork, linocuts
- Spouse: Gordon McArthur

Chrystabel Laurene McArthur (née Aitken, 1904 – 15 January 2005) was a versatile New Zealand artist. Her works are held in museums and galleries in New Zealand.

== Career ==
Chrystabel Aitken spent her early years on a farm in Southland, New Zealand. Recognising her artistic abilities her family moved to Christchurch so that she could attend the Canterbury College School of Art. Beginning her studies in 1921, her tutors included Francis Shurrock and James Alexander Johnstone. While at the college she received several scholarships for modelling, including the School medal for "Special Excellence in Modelling" in 1925. Following her graduation Aitken was also a tutor at the School of Art, working alongside Florence Akins, Bill Sutton, and Shurrock.

Aitken specialised in sculpture, although her work also includes jewellery, metalwork, and linocuts. Her sculptures often took animals as their subject. The Museum of New Zealand Te Papa Tongarewa holds examples of her artworks including a jewel casket.

Works by Aitken include: Horses and Riders and A Bull.

=== Exhibitions ===
Aitken exhibited with the Canterbury Society of Arts, the New Zealand Academy of Fine Arts and the New Zealand Centennial Exhibition.

Between 1936 and 1966 Aitken was a prominent member of The Group, an informal art association from Christchurch, New Zealand, formed to provide a freer alternative to the Canterbury Society of Arts. She contributed works to multiple exhibitions by including in: 1937; 1947; 1948; 1949; 1950; 1951; 1952; 1953; 1955; 1956; 1957.

The University of Canterbury holds a large public collection of art works by Aitken, with many pieces donated by the artist's family.

== Chrystabel L Aitken Scholarship for Fine Arts ==
The Chrystabel L Aitken Scholarship for Fine Arts was established in 2005 from an endowment under Aitken's will. It supports University of Canterbury students in the School of Fine Arts who face financial challenges.

== Personal life ==
Aitken was married to Gordon McArthur.
