= Rex Williams (disambiguation) =

Rex Williams is an English professional snooker and billiards player.

Rex Williams may also refer to:

- Rex Williams (American football), American football player.
- Rex Williams (politician) (1928–2012), Australian politician
- Rex Williams (commissioner), New Zealand chancellor of Canterbury University and commissioner at the Canterbury Regional Council

== See also ==
- Reg Williams (disambiguation)
