= Ronald Tremain =

New Zealand composer

Albert Ronald Tremain (1923 – 1998) was a New Zealand composer and music teacher.

== Biography ==
Born in Feilding, New Zealand in 1923, Tremain initially studied piano, gaining Trinity College diplomas before graduating with his first degree in music from Canterbury University College in 1946.

After war service he taught at Feilding High School and attended Cambridge Summer Music Schools (studying composition with Douglas Lilburn) in 1947 and 1948. He continued his studies at the Royal College of Music in London, gaining diplomas in piano performance and a doctorate in 1953.

Awards during this time included the Royal College of Music Cobbett Prize for string quartet, the Farrar Prize for composition, and 2nd Prize in the Lionel Tertis Awards. In 1952 he was awarded an Italian Government Bursary and studied composition with Goffredo Petrassi at the Conservatorio Santa Cecilia in Rome.

In 1957 he married Margaret Anne Severs, and later had four children; Sally, Gillian, Mary and William.

After some years working free-lance in London as a teacher, composer, and examiner he returned to New Zealand, where he spent ten years as a lecturer at the University of Auckland. In 1963 he was awarded the Carnegie Travelling Fellowship and toured universities in the United States. From 1967 to 1968 he was Visiting Professor at the School of Music, University of Michigan, Ann Arbor, and from 1968 to 1969 Visiting Professor of Theory and Composition at the State University of New York, Buffalo. He then returned to Britain to lecture at Goldsmiths College at the University of London.

In 1970 he moved to Canada where, until his retirement in 1989, he was Professor of Music at Brock University. He was made a Professor Emeritus in 1991. Tremain died at Niagara on the Lake, Ontario in 1998.

Notable students include John Rimmer and Barry Vercoe.

== Selected works ==
- Allegro for Strings
- Five Epigrams for Twelve Solo Strings for string ensemble of any size
- Four Medieval Lyrics for mezzo-soprano and string trio
- Magnificat and Nunc dimittis for soprano solo and mixed choir
- Mass for mixed voices and organ
- Music for Violin and Strings for solo violin and string orchestra
- Nine Studies for violin and viola (1960)
- Psalm 100 for unaccompanied choir
- Seven Medieval Lyrics for solo tenor, mixed choir and orchestra
- Tenera Juventa for mixed choir and 2 pianos
- Three Inventions for piano
- Three Poems of James Joyce for baritone and viola (1975, revised 1990)
- Three Songs for soprano and viola (1960)
