= Reggie Williams =

Reggie Williams may refer to:

== Basketball ==
- Reggie Williams (basketball, born 1964), former basketball player in the NBA
- Reggie Williams (basketball, born 1986), American basketball guard

== Baseball ==
- Reggie Williams (1980s outfielder) (born 1960), former outfielder in MLB during the 1980s
- Reggie Williams (1990s outfielder) (born 1966), former outfielder in MLB during the 1990s

== Others ==
- Reggie Williams (Canadian football) (born 1983), American wide receiver in the Canadian Football League
- Reggie Williams (wide receiver) (born 1983), American wide receiver in the National Football League
- Reggie Williams (linebacker) (born 1954), American foortball linebacker
- Reggie Williams (activist) (1951–1999), American activist who spread awareness of HIV/AIDS to communities of color
- Reggie Williams (cricketer) (born 1969), English cricketer

== See also ==
- Reginald Williams (disambiguation)
