= Reginald Williams =

Reginald or Reg Williams may refer to:

- Reginald Williams (MP) (died 1612), English MP for Preston, 1571 and Montgomeryshire, 1593
- Reg Williams (priest) (1914–2012), New Zealand archdeacon
- Reg Williams (rugby league) (fl. 1920s/1930s), Australian footballer
- Skilly Williams (1890–1959), English footballer
- Reg Williams (footballer) (1922–2011), English footballer

== See also ==
- Reggie Williams (disambiguation)
