= Doris Tutill =

New Zealand artist and teacher (1843–1910)

Doris Hartley Tutill (1916–2010) was a New Zealand artist and Anglican priest. Her works are held in the collections of the Christchurch Art Gallery.

Reverend Doris Tutill was born in 1916, in Christchurch. Tutill enrolled in the Canterbury College School of Art straight out of primary school, and studied there from 1929 to 1934. Tutill studied under many leading figures of the Canterbury Arts and Crafts movement. Tutill's teachers included Dorothy Brewster, Ivy Fife, Hilda McIntyre, Florence Atkins, Julia Scarvell, Francis Shurrock, Louise Henderson, and James Johnstone. Tutill studied alongside Bill Sutton, Isobel Boone, and Hannah Taylor.

After finishing art school, Tutill worked for Whitcombe & Tombs, Christchurch, as a designer. Towards the end of the 1930s she joined a Christchurch studio making parchment. Working from home, she also produced cards, bookmarks and book covers for sale in department stores.

In around 1954 Tutill was appointed head of art at St Margaret's College, and remained in that position for about 25 years. Tutill branched out into stained glass window design, and in 1984 designed a window for St George's Hospital Chapel, Merivale, Christchurch, which was executed by Paul Hutchins.

One of Tutill's watercolour works, Maori whare and tiki design, was featured in an exhibition at the National Gallery of Victoria, Melbourne, in 2008 titled Art Deco: 1910-1939. This work features Māori motifs of wharenui and tiki, against a bright starburst background. Tutill produced works during her teenage years which explored Māori iconography. In an interview with Ken Hall in 2007, Tutill admitted that at the time she had known very little about Māori art, and was bemused at the attention these works of hers received. Maori whare and tiki design was donated by Tutill to the Christchurch Art Gallery in 2008.

Tutill was ordained into the Anglican church in 1986. She died on 31 January 2010.
