= Gerald Melling =

English-born New Zealand architect, poet, novelist, journalist, author and editor

- Born: 1943; Liverpool, England
- Died: 22 December 2012 (aged 68–69); Wellington, New Zealand
- Occupations: Architect, poet, novelist, journalist, author, editor
- Buildings: Signal box, Sky box, Samurai house
- Website: Melling

Gerald John Melling (1943 – 22 December 2012) was an English-born architect, poet, novelist, journalist, author, and editor.

== Early life and education ==
Melling took an interest in art and poetry at a young age before choosing architecture as a creative outlet and a way to make a living. He left school at 16 to work in an architect's office as a cadet and attended night classes at Liverpool Technical Institute. In 1976, Melling received formal architectural training at Auckland University, and he gained his architectural registration in 1977.

== Work ==
He worked briefly in New York City and Toronto as a magazine editor before emigrating to New Zealand in 1971 to work for the Ministry of Works in Porirua.

Beginning in 1977, Melling was employed at the Board Of Education, where he worked on various school projects including Worser Bay School and Thorndon Kindergarten. This period sparked his interest in education theory and environments for learning and culminated in the publishing of his book Open Schoolhouse in 1981.

Melling was briefly the editor of the «New Zealand Architect» magazine while at the Education Board. He wrote the first books about living New Zealand architects Ian Athfield ("Joyful Architecture: The Genius of New Zealand's Ian Athfield") and Roger Walker ("Positively Architecture: New Zealand's Roger Walker"), helping to bring New Zealand architecture to a worldwide audience.

In 1990, he formed Melling Morse Architects with Allan Morse, and the pair worked on public and private buildings including the redevelopment of Left Bank Arcade, Auckland’s Butterfly Creek, and Melling's own home The Skybox, which sits atop the Melling Morse Architects office in Egmont Street.

He experimented which various techniques, including efficient planning, incorporation of recycled materials, "low-tech" timber construction systems, and reduction in scale. A typical Melling house employed vernacular construction techniques (and occasionally vernacular forms) combined with the double living height spaces, mezzanines, open plan layouts, and modular gridded organisation more usually associated with high modernist architecture.

In 2008, Melling Morse Architects won the Home New Zealand Home of the Year award for a small Wairarapa home called the Signal Box.

Following the Boxing Day Tsunami in 2004, he designed almost 50 houses and a community centre along the south coast of Sri Lanka, eventually writing a book entitled Tsunami Box about his experiences.

== Personal ==
Melling is noted for his unique brand of Liverpudlian humour and Beatles-style anti-establishmentarianism, which he often brought into his work. He fathered two children: a daughter, Zoe Melling, and a son, David Melling, who is also an architect. He died on 22 December 2012 surrounded by his family.

== Selected articles ==
"Thorndon Clinic", in Wellington's New Buildings, David Kernohan Victoria University Press, 1989

"The Music Box", in World Architecture A Critical Mosaic 1900 -2000 Vol.10 Southeast Asia and Oceania Springer Weinn, New York City, 1999

"The Samurai House" and "Skybox", in at Home: A Century Of New Zealand Design, Douglas Lloyd Jenkins Godwit/Random House, 2004

"The Music Box" and "Skybox", in Exquisite Apart, ed. Charles Walker 100 Years of Architecture in New Zealand NZIA, Auckland, 2004

"The Samurai House", in Architecture Inspired by New Zealand Mint Publishing, Auckland, 2006

"Skybox", in Home: New Directions in World Architecture and Design, Millennium House, NSW, Australia, 2006

Also numerous magazines, including Architectural Review, AIA Journal, Hauser, Architecture and Design India, New Zealand Architect, Architecture New Zealand, Home & Entertaining

== Published written work ==
- Tsunami Box, Press Free range, 2010
- An Artful Lodger NZIA 2005 Lecture Series – architecture poems.Thumbprint Press Broadsheet, 2005
- Open Home(co-authored with Dave Cull, Stuart Niven, & George Chimirri)Random House, Auckland, 1994
- Mid City Crisis & Other Stories Thumbprint Press, Wellington, 1989
- Positively Architecture: New Zealand’s Roger Walker Square One Press, Dunedin, 1985
- Open Schoolhouse: Environments for children in New Zealand Caveman Press, Dunedin, 1981
- Joyful Architecture: The genius of New Zealand’s Ian Athfield Caveman Press, Dunedin, 1980

== Poetry by Gerald John Melling ==
Cursory Rhymes, June 2013 Published by Thumbprint Victoria University Press in association with Sport

Melling began to write the poems collected in this book when he was diagnosed with cancer in late October 2012. They were later combined into a book and introduced by Geoff Cochrane, who is a poet and fiction writer and a dear friend of Melling.

b.1943, Bumper Books, 1999 Postcards from the Coast, Thumbprint Press, 1992 Illustrated Poetry, Satyrday Publications,1968

His poems appeared in Landfall, Islands, Sport, Takahe, the Listener, and elsewhere.

== Awards and mentions ==
Signal box, HOME New Zealand, Home of the Year 2008 3 News, 7 August 2008 Houses New Zealand, Issue 6, Gerald Melling The Gravy, Episode 13, May 2009

Samurai house TVNZ Home Front Feature Phaidon Atlas of 21st Century Architecture

Music box, NZ Timber Design Journal, Issue 3/Vol. 6, 1997 Wellington City Council Case Study

Split box, Modern Residential Design, 2008 Phaidon Atlas of 21st Century Architecture

== Other publications ==
Several anthologies of New Zealand poetry, and numerous literary journals and magazines, including Canadian Forum, New American / Canadian Poetry, Open City, Islands, Landfall, NZ Listener, Sport, Cave, NZ Poetry.
