= Jeff Leigh =

New Zealand cricketer

Personal information
- Full name: Jeffrey Allan Leigh
- Born: 26 October 1950; Stratford, New Zealand
- Died: 2 July 2012 (aged 61)
- Batting: Left-handed
- Role: Wicketkeeper

Domestic team information
- Years: Team
- 1977/78: Northern Districts

Career statistics
Competition	First-class
Matches	5
Runs scored	7
Batting average	3.50
100s/50s	0/0
Top score	7*
Catches/stumpings	10/0
- Source: Cricinfo, 16 June 2020

Jeffrey Allan Leigh (26 October 1950 – 2 July 2012) was a New Zealand cricketer who played five first-class matches for Northern Districts. Leigh was a left-handed tail-end batsman and a wicketkeeper; he batted only three times in his five first-class matches and scored just seven runs, all in one not-out innings. He took 10 catches.

Leigh died on 2 July 2012.
