= Dorothy Manning =

New Zealand artist (1919–2012)

Dorothy Waters
- Born: Dorothy Jordan Manning; 21 August 1919
- Died: 31 May 2012 (aged 92); Napier, New Zealand
- Known for: Painting
- Notable work: Road to sea
- Spouse: Leo Campbell Waters

Dorothy Jordan Waters (née Manning, 21 August 1919 – 31 May 2012) was a New Zealand artist.

Works by Manning include 'Road to sea' and are in the collection of the Museum of New Zealand Te Papa Tongarewa.

== Career ==
Manning exhibited with New Zealand art societies including: Auckland Society of Arts; Canterbury Society of Arts; New Zealand Academy of Fine Arts. She was also a member of the Canterbury-based art association 'The Group', and exhibited with them in: 1945; 1947; 1948; 1949; 1950; 1951; 1952; 1954; 1955; 1956; 1957; 1961; 1962.

She was part of the council for the Canterbury Society of Arts.

== Personal life ==
She was the wife of Leo Campbell Waters.
