= Florence Akins =

New Zealand artist

- Born: 26 March 1906; Christchurch, Canterbury, New Zealand
- Died: 18 October 2012 (age 106); Nelson, New Zealand
- Education: Canterbury College School of Art

Florence Eleanor Akins (26 March 1906 – 18 October 2012) was a New Zealand artist.

== Life ==
Akins was born in Christchurch in 1906 and died at age 106 on 18 October 2012 in Nelson. She studied visual arts at the Canterbury College School of Art and graduated with a Diploma in Fine Arts in 1931. Akins was a long-serving member of staff at the school, working there full-time from 1936 to 1969.

== Career ==
Akins worked alongside, and was close friends with, fellow Canterbury College School of Art artists Bill Sutton, Francis Shurrock and, her particular friend, Chrystabel Aitken. Akins' notable students included Doris Tutill, and Ngarita Johnstone.

Akins was highly regarded for her metalwork, and for her work in textiles. In 1946 Akins was asked to incorporate weaving into the curriculum at the Canterbury College School of Art. She approached expert weaver Josephine Glasgow to teach Akins the art of hand weaving, which continued to be taught at the School until Akins' retirement in 1969.

After her retirement, Akins continued to mark student papers until 1980.
