= Peter Sharp (cricketer) =

New Zealand cricketer

Personal information
- Full name: Peter Andrew Sharp
- Born: 11 August 1939; Invercargill, New Zealand
- Died: 18 February 2012 (aged 72); Christchurch, New Zealand
- Batting: Right-handed
- Bowling: Right-arm off spin
- Role: Bowler

Domestic team information
- Years: Team
- 1964/65–1965/66: Canterbury
- FC debut: 25 December 1964 Canterbury v Otago
- Last FC: 10 January 1966 Canterbury v Central Districts

Career statistics
Competition	First-class
Matches	8
Runs scored	19
Batting average	6.33
100s/50s	0/0
Top score	7*
Balls bowled	1,773
Wickets	21
Bowling average	26.90
5 wickets in innings	0
10 wickets in match	0
Best bowling	4/55
Catches/stumpings	9/–
- Source: CricketArchive, 20 February 2012

Peter Sharp (11 August 1939 – 18 February 2012) was a New Zealand cricketer. An off spinner, Sharp played eight first-class cricket matches for Canterbury between 1964 and 1966.

After his cricket career Sharp was at various times a selector for Canterbury, president of Cricket Canterbury and a board member of New Zealand Cricket.

Sharp also worked for 45 years as a cricket commentator for the now disbanded Radio Sport.

From 1956 Southland Boys' High School Old Boys Register: At School 1953–56. 1st XI, 1955–56. 1st XI (soccer), 1956. Senior fives champion (doubles), 1956. Prefect, 1956. R.S.M., 1956.
