= Reg Williams (priest) =

New Zealand priest

Reginald Ottrey Williams (1914–2012) was Archdeacon of Rangiora from 1968 until 1979.

He was educated at the University of New Zealand and ordained in 1941. After a curacy at Addington he was Priest in charge of Westland. He then held incumbencies at Lincoln, Addington and Linwood before his appointment as archdeacon.

He died on 31 July 2012.
