= Francis Shurrock =

New Zealand sculptor and art teacher (1887–1977)

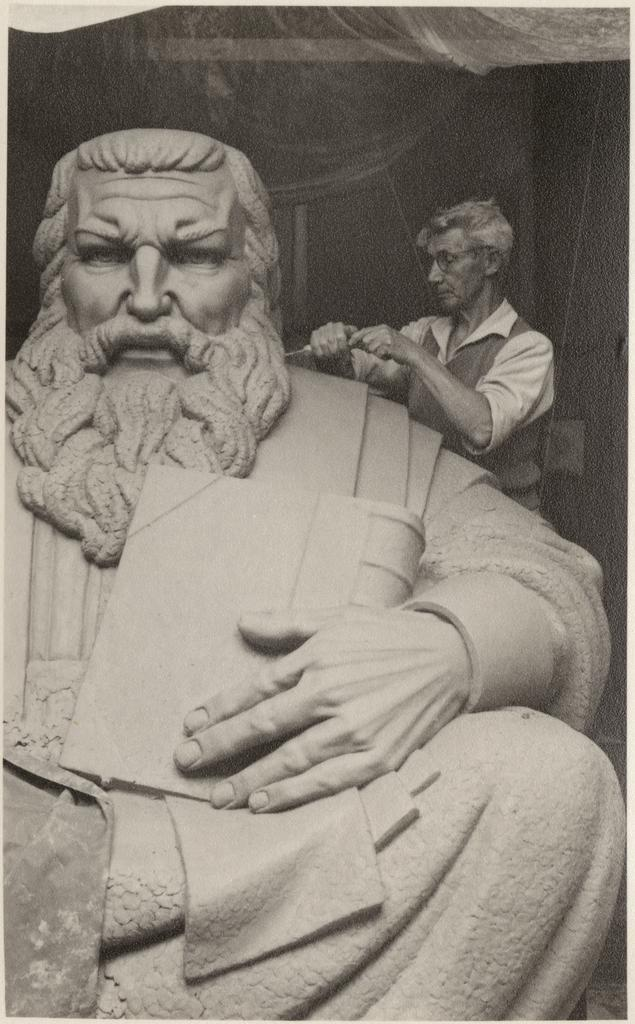
- F.A. Shurrock and 'History'. University of Otago, Hocken Digital Collections
- Born: 5 August 1887; Warrington, Lancashire, England
- Died: 7 October 1977 (aged 90); Christchurch, New Zealand
- Education: Royal College of Art
- Known for: Sculpture
- Notable work: Christopher (Bust of Christopher Perkins), Centennial Memorial, Massey Memorial and statue of John Fitzgerald

Francis Aubrey Shurrock A.R.C.A. (1887–1977) was a British born sculptor who became an influential teacher in New Zealand. He was born in Warrington, Lancashire, England on 5 August 1887. He studied under Édouard Lantéri at the Royal College of Art, London from 1909 to 1913.

== Early life ==
Shurrock was born on 5 August 1887 in Warrington, Lancashire, England to Aubrey Hilsdon Shurrock and Clementina Leticia Handley. He was the fifth child out of six, but only three of his siblings survived to adulthood. Francis Shurrock attended Tarvin Village Grammar School, which his father was the headmaster. He was described as a natural athlete and was involved in sport growing up. He then studied at County School, Chester until 1904 and, in 1904, he was appointed pupil teacher at the Chester School of Art and studied there full-time by 1907. He excelled at drawing, and this can be noted as the early beginnings of his prosperous artistic career.

== Training and career ==
In 1909, Shurrock was awarded a scholarship to study at the Royal College of Art (RCA) in London and was awarded the A.R.C.A. (Associate of the Royal College of Art) in modelling in 1912. He graduated with a full Diploma the following year. While still a student at the Royal College, his sculpture Peter was praised by Auguste Rodin, a friend of Shurrock’s teacher Edouard Lanteri. Lanteri was considered an extremely talented and inspirational artist and educator, and Shurrock admired how Lanteri did not want to create clones of himself, but instead to inspire individuals to recognise their own talents and exceed in their own individual ways and artistic styles. Peter was one of many human figure sculptures Shurrock created throughout his lifetime, many of which were sculpted from drawings of his close family and friends. These sculptures were often commended for their remarkable realism and similarity to that of the style of the great sculptors of the Renaissance.

At the Royal College of Art, Shurrock learnt alongside a multitude of notable British artists such as Charles Sargeant Jagger, Charles Wheeler, Leon Underwood, Harold Brownsword, William McMillan, Gilbert Ledward and Harold Youngman. Many of these fellow students would later provide inspiration and friendship in later years when Shurrock moved to New Zealand. After leaving art school, Shurrock took a position teaching sculpture at King Edward VII School of Art in Newcastle upon Tyne but, at the onset of World War I, he joined the West Yorkshire Regiment. He was wounded, gassed and taken prisoner by the Germans early in 1918. From 1919 to 1923, Shurrock headed the School of Science and Art at Weston-super-Mare. This School had been established in 1893 in response to the Government-led reform to ‘promote qualifications that would create skilled technicians and designers to support Great Britain's industrial dominance’.

== Shurrock in New Zealand ==
At the end of 1923, Shurrock set off for Christchurch, New Zealand, arriving in January 1924. He was part of the Department of Education’s La Trobe Scheme, an effort by the New Zealand Government to attract art teachers (including Robert Field, William Allen, Roland Hipkins and Christopher Perkins) from overseas to "foster professionalism in the training of artists."

Shurrock took up the position of Modelling and Art Craft Master at the Canterbury College School of Art and went on to teach there for the next 25 years. The first years of teaching must have come as quite a shock to Shurrock, as part of his teaching programme included classes with 11 and 12 year old children who had often sent to do art to punish bad behaviour. Art historian Michael Dunn described The Canterbury College School of Art of that time as being, "more like a secondary school than an English art school." But, over the years, the College transformed into a more typical art school and Shurrock's students would include painters Bill Sutton, Rita Angus and Tosswill Woollaston along with Molly Macalister, Alison Duff and Jim Allen, who all became practising sculptors.

In November 1925, Shurrock married Elizabeth Davidson Hilson and they remained together until her death in 1972. During his time at the College, Shurrock's interest in Morris dance spread among other teachers. Alongside Florence Akins and Leo Bensemann, Shurrock performed publicly and was President of the Christchurch Folk Dance Society. One of his students, Juliet Peter, recalled the sound of the team practising in the art school modelling room. Shurrock was also a regular commentator on art and social issues and a contributor to the magazines Tomorrow and Art in New Zealand.

== Style and Subject ==
Shurrock was a prolific sculptor, working at a time when painting was considered the only really acceptable art form. This attitude continued into the 1950s, where Shurrock and his sculpture-based students were considered craftsmen, rather than artists. He faced difficulties in reviving his artistic career, which had been put on pause due to the war and his educational efforts. Commissions to begin and display works were extremely difficult and could only be possible under the agreement from the Council of Canterbury College.

== Exhibitions ==
Although he was a full-time teacher, Shurrock was also committed to his own work. He was a regular exhibitor of sculpture, painting, watercolours and prints, particularly in the 1930s, when he showed with the Canterbury and Otago Art Societies, The Group in Christchurch and, on a number of occasions, at the Royal Academy of Arts in London. Selected exhibitions include:

1927 Annual Exhibition Dunedin Public Art Gallery Society. Shurrock’s exhibition of his sculpture The Gymnast was received with acclaim by local critics. “How splendid it would be if the hall could be dotted with figures such as Mr Shurrock’s Gymnast! His exhibits last year were life size, strong pieces of work, and one sees that when he works on a small scale there is as much work and as much strength. This little figure is alive with tense vigour. The modelling is faultless, and from whatever position one views it the pose is sheer joy.” The sculpture was purchased for the Dunedin Public Art Gallery by a group of art enthusiasts.

1930s The Group. Shurrock contributed to four exhibitions (1931, 1932, 1933 and 1934). In 1932, his bust of artist Christopher Perkins was described as "a vigorous and masterly impression of an extraordinary artist and man. The head and torso are freely and broadly modelled, giving a cast which very ably combines masculinity with sensitiveness." In the other shows, Shurrock exhibited linocuts, watercolours and woodblock prints.

1934 Annual Academy of Arts Exhibition. Shurrock exhibited woodblock prints. "Mr Francis Shurrock in his two colour-block prints, succeeds in giving an effect of soft colour, without any inaccuracy in the register of any of the numerous blocks."

1934 and 1939 Royal Academy of Arts Exhibition, London. His inclusion in the 1934 exhibition had surprised Shurrock. He had sent a plaster cast bust of Mr Edward Armstrong, architect of the Robert McDougall Art Gallery, to England for casting, and his British agent had forwarded the bronze to the Royal Academy of Arts, who had accepted it for exhibition. The 1939 exhibition included another of Shurrock’s cast bronze heads.

1940 New Zealand Art: A Centennial Exhibition Wellington. Shurrock had five works selected, including the Commemorative panel for the Robert McDougall Art Gallery and his bronze bust of Christopher Perkins that was illustrated in the catalogue.

2000 Francis Shurrock: Shaping New Zealand Sculpture Robert McDougall Art Gallery. Curator Mark Stocker commented on this exhibition’s timing: "in 1932, Shurrock published an article entitled McDougall Art Gallery, Christchurch in Art in New Zealand, which welcomed, described and illustrated the 'new gallery' as it then was. Now, in 2000–1, Shurrock's work is among the very last to be exhibited in the McDougall before its closure and replacement by the new art gallery."

2025 Dear Shurrie: Francis Shurrock and his Contemporaries Christchurch Art Gallery. Curated by Peter Vangioni and Felicity Milburn.

== Commissioned works ==
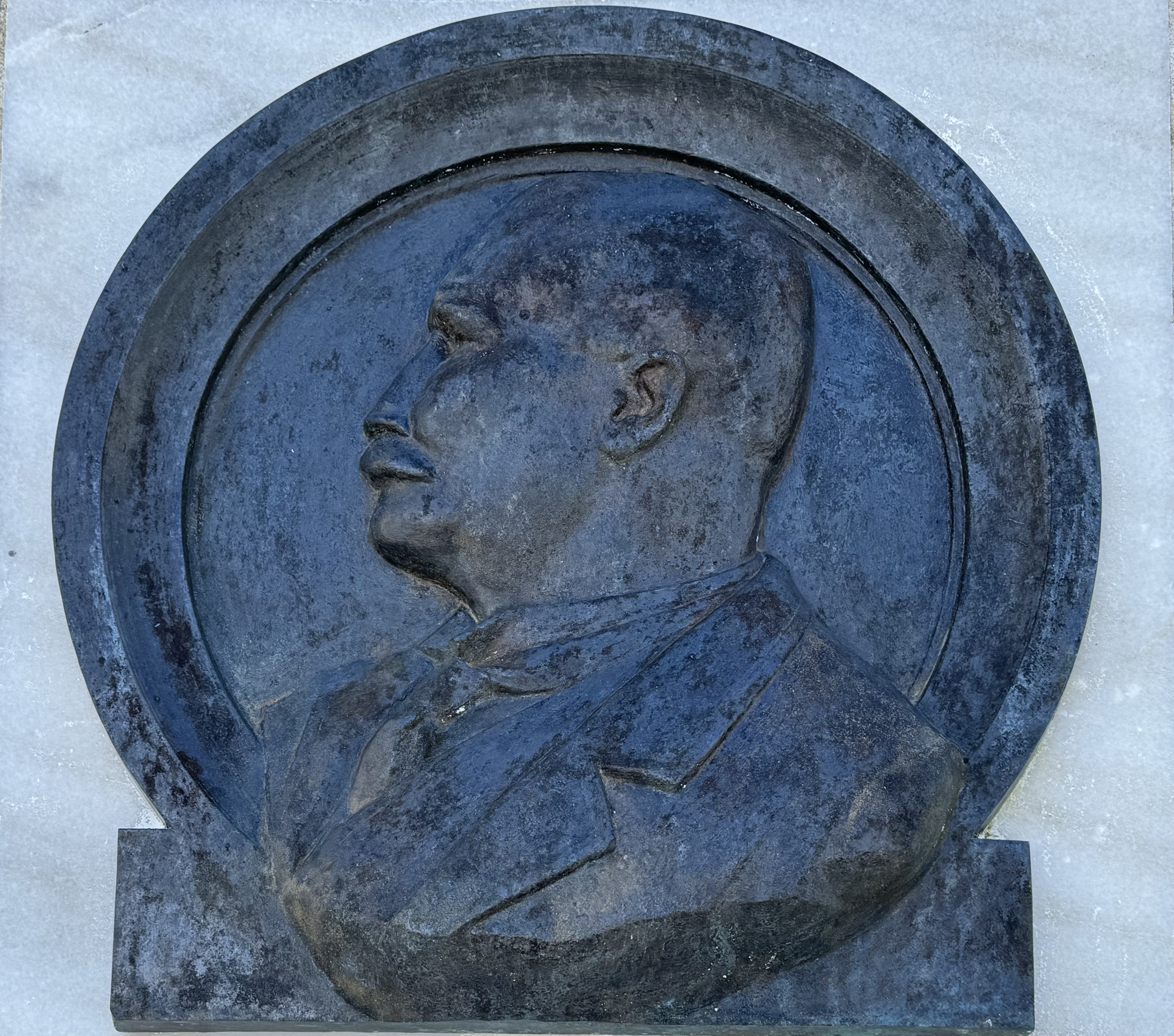
Relief portrait of Prime Minister William Massey

=== Massey Memorial ===
In 1927, Shurrock was commissioned to create a carved marble relief as a portrait medallion of William Massey (New Zealand Prime Minister from 1912-1925) for a large memorial to be constructed on Point Halswell in Wellington. Shurrock was required to work from photographs, as he would years later with his statue of James Fitzgerald. The portrait was intended to be "impressively detached from all inscriptions….in high relief, contrasting with other carvings proposed to be cut on the piers on either side of it." In 1930, William Allen, one of Shurrock’s colleagues at the Christchurch College of Art, painted him working on the Massey carving.

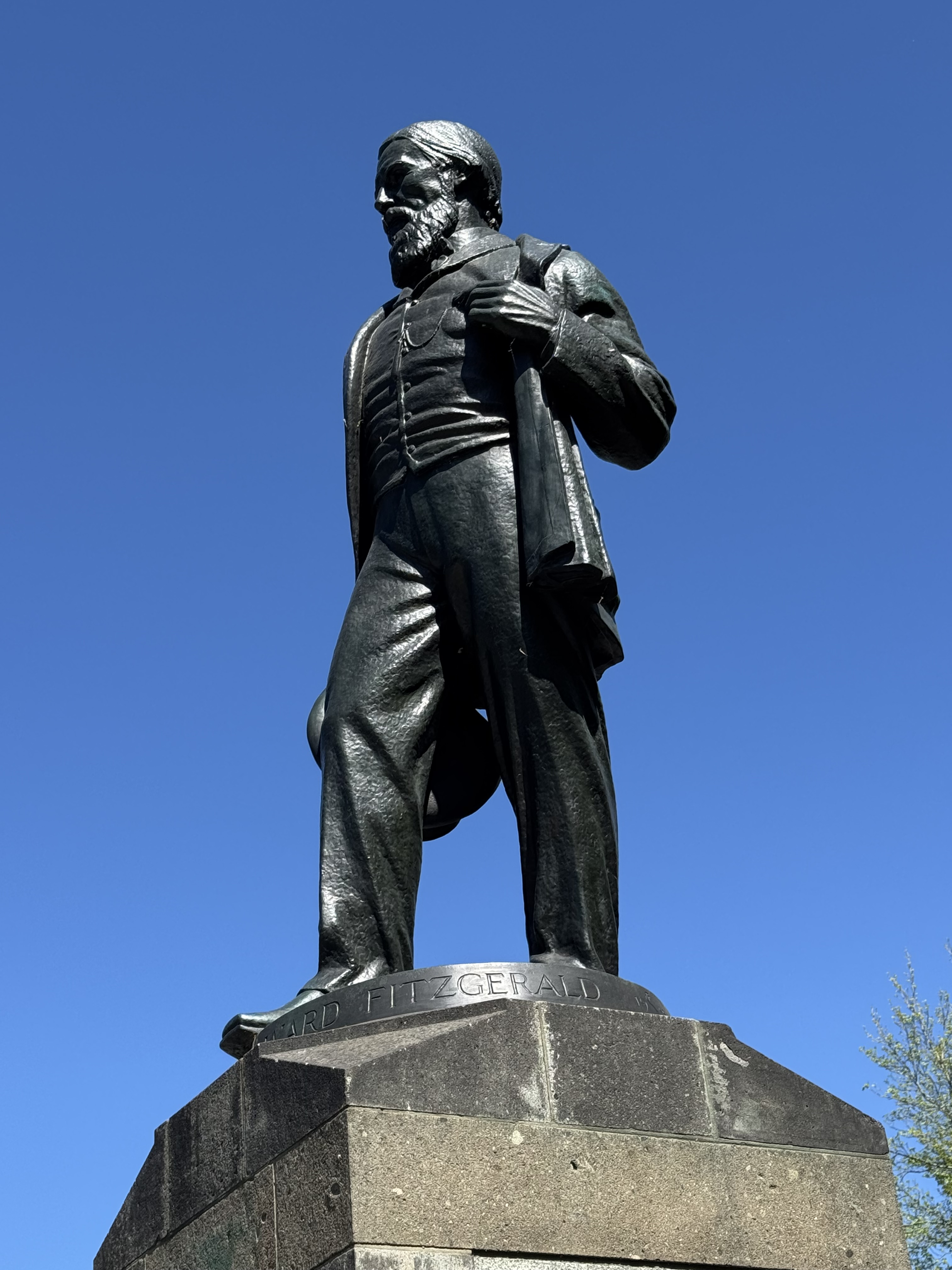
James Fitzgerald statue unveiled 1939

=== James Edward Fitzgerald statue ===
Shurrock was commissioned in 1934 by local philanthropist Richard. E. Green to make a statue of James Edward Fitzgerald, one of Canterbury’s leading pioneers. The proposed work was offered to the city of Christchurch. It was initially accepted but then the City Council rejected the gift following controversy over the donor. The work was then sold to the Christchurch Beautifying Association, who arranged to have it cast in bronze in Britain. In August 1936, the 2.6 meter bronze sculpture arrived in Christchurch and, in February 1936, it was finally erected on the south end of Rolleston Avenue, facing Cashel Street.

=== Robert McDougall plaque ===
After initial reservations by its subject, art patron and philanthropist Robert McDougall, Shurrock’s 1933 relief bronze plaque of him was mounted in the foyer of the McDougall Art Gallery.

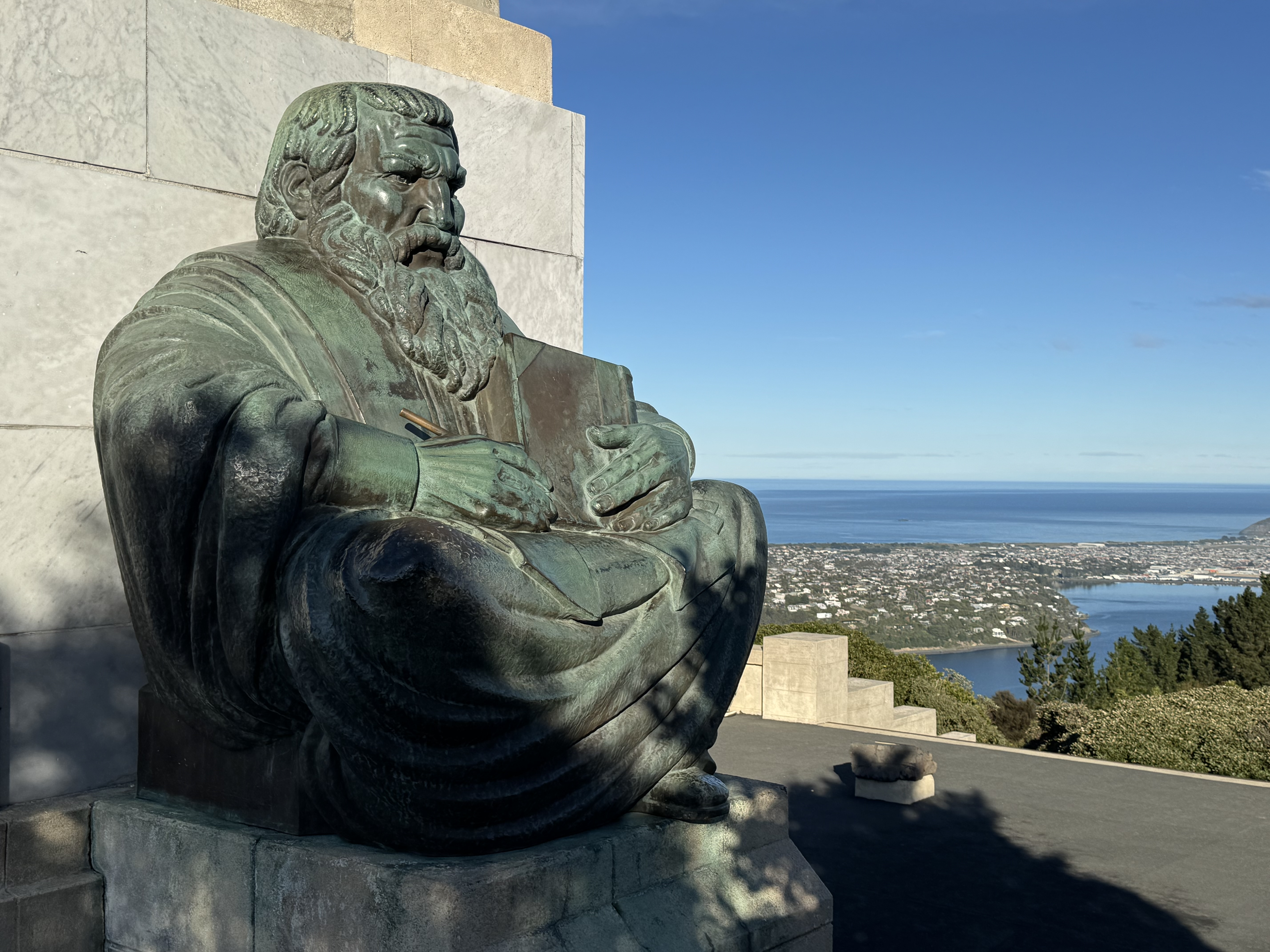
'History' one of the two figures sculpted by Shurrock for the Centennial Memorial in Dunedin

=== Signal Hill Memorial ===
Shurrock was invited to make two large sculptures to sit on either side of the central architectural form of the Centennial Memorial on Signal Hill in Dunedin. In April 1950, Shurrock presented models of the two sculptures, one of a woman spinning, known as The Thread of Life and the other, titled History, showing an old man holding a closed book representing the end of the century. To help scale the work from models to full-sized sculptures, Shurrock was joined by former student Fred Staub, who is usually given joint credit with Shurrock for the work. The plaque on the memorial records that the two figures were cast in London and installed in 1957.

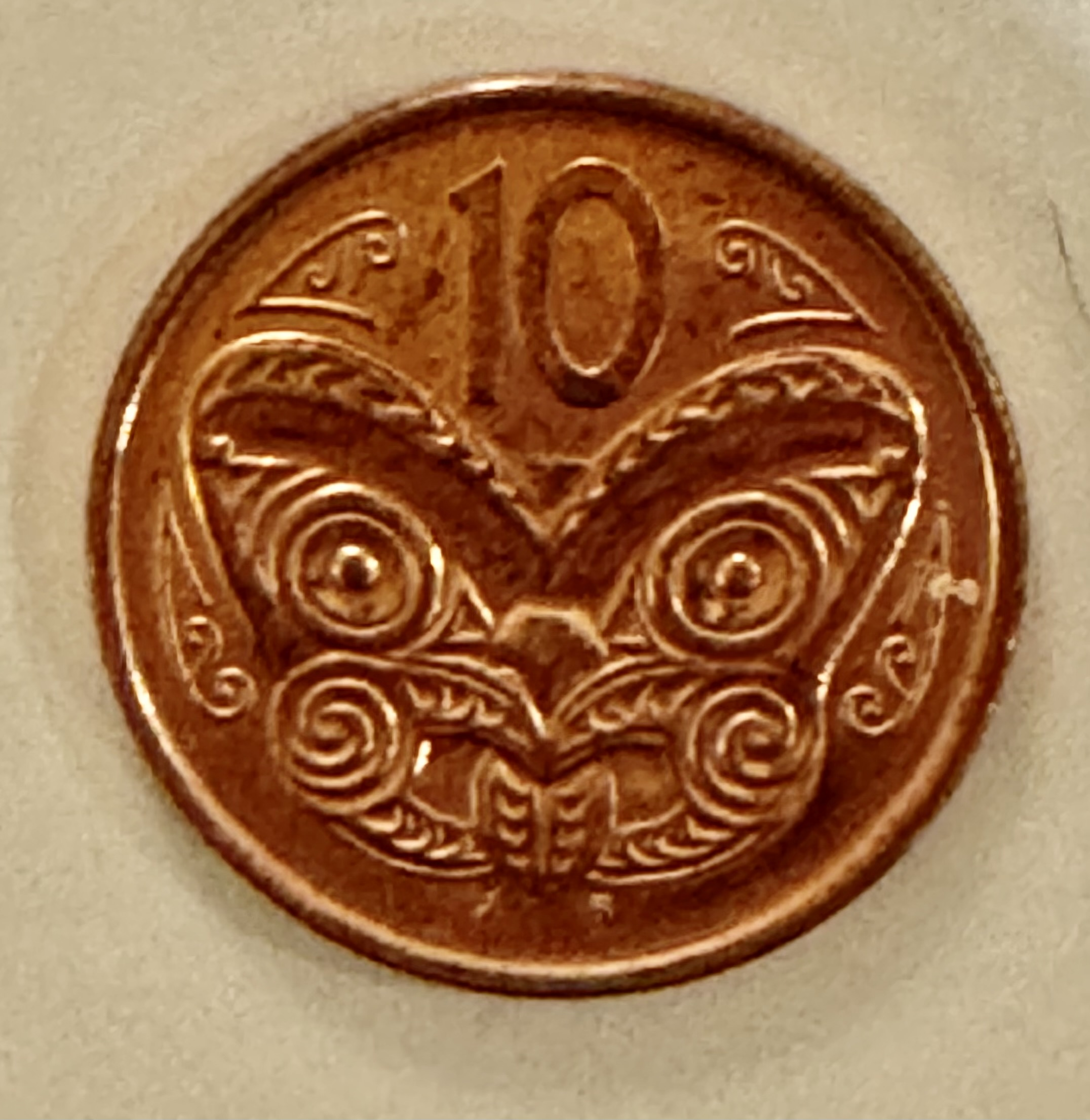
Berry's presentation of Shurrock's design for the 10 cent coin

== The decimal coin controversy ==
In the mid-1960s, Shurrock was invited by the Coinage Design Advisory Committee to submit designs for New Zealand's new decimal coins that were to be issued on 10 July, 1967. In February 1966, the designs of the six coins were leaked to a newspaper. Shurrock’s designs had already met with a negative response from the Royal Mint and now the general public had an opportunity to examine drawings Shurrock had made for his coin designs, including a rugby player for the twenty cent piece. The public response was immediate and negative. The Government then rejected all of Shurrock’s designs save one: Shurrock’s concept of a stylised Māori wheku (a carved representation of a human face) for the 10 cent piece was reworked by James Berry for the final coin that remains in use.

Francis Shurrock died on 7 October, 1977, in Christchurch, New Zealand.

== Collections ==
Auckland Art Gallery Toi o Tamaki

Te Papa Te Papa Tongarewa

Christchurch Art Gallery Te Puna o Whaiwhetu
