= Alison Duff =

New Zealand sculptor, potter, printmaker (1914–2000)

Alison Salter
- Born: Alison Duff; 7 July 1914; Invercargill, New Zealand
- Died: 19 March 2000 (aged 85); Auckland, New Zealand
- Education: University of Canterbury School of Art. East Sydney Technical College (Sculpture), 1938.
- Known for: Sculpture, pottery, teaching

Alison Stirling Duff (married name Salter, 7 July 1914 – 19 March 2000) was a New Zealand sculptor, potter and teacher.

== Family ==
Born in Invercargill in 1914, she was the daughter of Jessie Barclay and Oliver Duff, writer and foundation editor of the New Zealand Listener. Alison was also the aunt of New Zealand novelist Alan Duff.

== Education ==
Duff studied at the University of Canterbury School of Art under Francis Shurrock. She went on to study sculpture at East Sydney Technical College, graduating in 1938. Duff returned briefly to New Zealand after graduating, and three of her sculptures were included in the 1939-40 New Zealand Centennial Exhibition.

== Teaching career ==
Duff taught in Hobart for seven years as the head of the Sculpture Department at Hobart Technical College before moving to Sydney, where she taught at Sydney Technical College for a further five. Returning to New Zealand, she became a teacher at Auckland Girls' Grammar School.

== Career ==
Duff was considered as one of the artists who ushered in the 'official birth' of sculpture in Aotearoa New Zealand. She often created works in pairs, inspired by the way nature forms complementary relationships.

By the mid 1950s Duff was working full-time on her sculpture. Among her characteristic works from this time are portrait busts such as Sir Edmund Hillary (1959) in the Auckland Art Gallery collection. Art historian Anne Kirker writes 'This work is made from cement, a medium that enhances the rugged and tough demeanour of the eminent New Zealander.'

Duff's work was regularly featured in the Auckland City Art Gallery's survey exhibitions of current artistic practice in the 1960s. She was included in Contemporary New Zealand Painting and Sculpture (1960), Contemporary New Zealand Painting and Sculpture (1962), Recent New Zealand Sculpture (1966) and Recent New Zealand Sculpture (1968) at the Gallery. A major exhibition of her work from 1944 onwards was held at the New Vision Gallery in 1970.

== Collections ==
Her work is held in the collections of Museum of New Zealand Te Papa Tongarewa and Auckland Art Gallery Toi o Tamaki.

== Death ==
She died in Auckland in 2000.
