= Séraphine Pick =

New Zealand painter

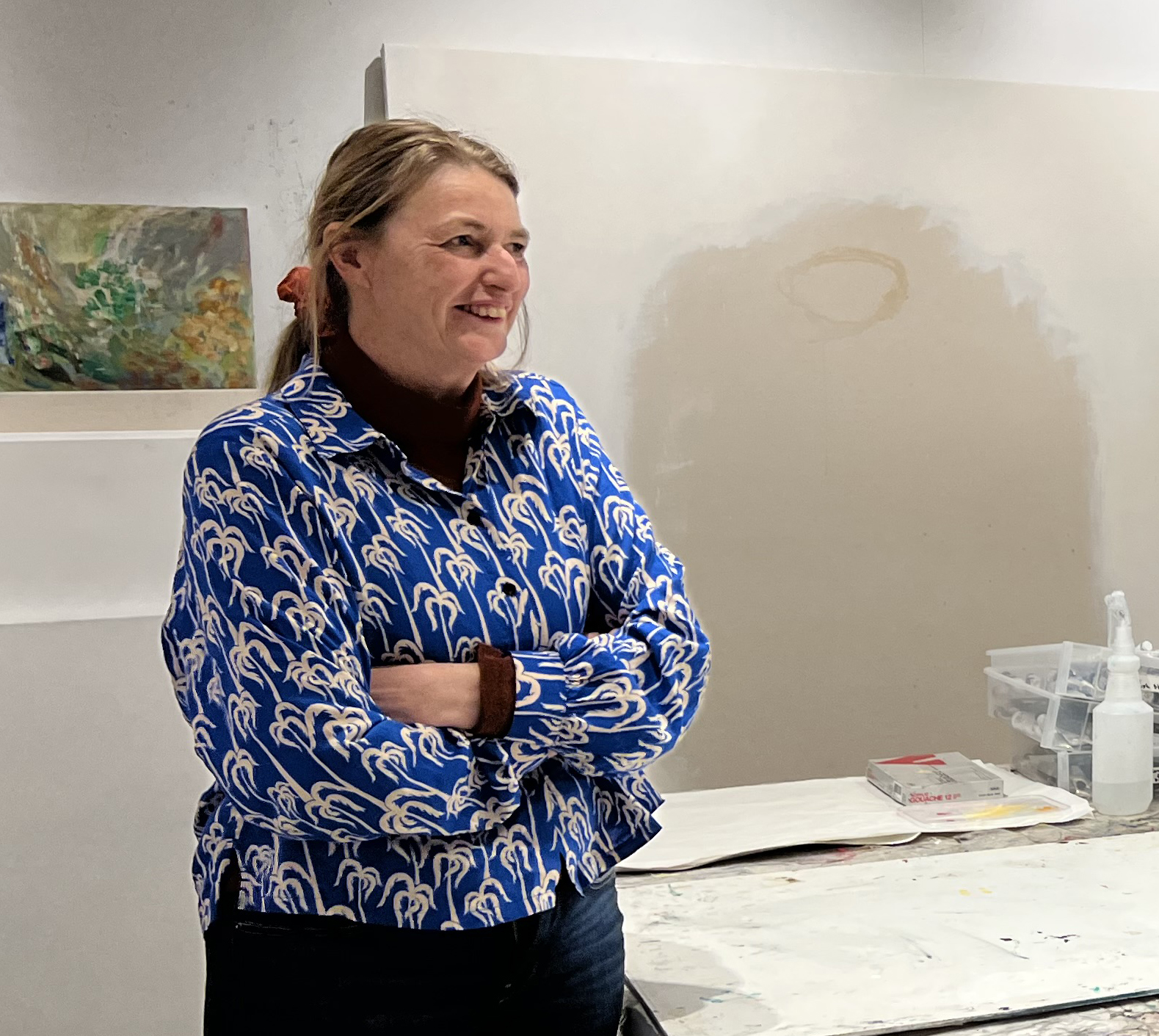
- Séraphine Pick in her Wellington studio, 2023
- Born: 23 May 1964 (age 62); Kawakawa, New Zealand
- Known for: Contemporary painting

Séraphine Pick (born 23 May 1964, in Kawakawa, New Zealand) is a New Zealand painter. Pick has exhibited frequently at New Zealand public art galleries; a major survey of her work was organised and toured by the Christchurch Art Gallery in 2009–10.

== Education ==
Pick graduated with a Bachelor of Fine Arts in painting from Ilam School of Fine Arts, University of Canterbury in 1988. In 1991 she completed a Diploma of Teaching at the Christchurch College of Education.

== Career ==
Early in her career Pick was grouped with other Ilam graduates, such as Tony de Lautour, Shane Cotton, Peter Robinson, Saskia Leek and Bill Hammond under the title of the Pencilcase Painters, known for a painting style that evoked the doodlings of bored teenagers. Pick drew on many sources for the imagery in her painting, from pop culture magazines to pre-Renaissance paintings to naive art. Writing about her work of the 1990s, curator Lara Strongman notes that 'Pick frequently incorporated renditions of talismanic objects from her childhood (red boots, party dresses, paper-bag masks, iron bed-frames) in earlier works, leading her practice to be viewed misleadingly as autobiographical'.

Two early residency opportunities (the Olivia Spencer Bower Award in 1994 and the Rita Angus Artist Residency in 1995) enabled Pick to take time away from secondary school art teaching and concentrate on painting full-time. During both residencies she was able to produce bodies of work that 'built upon her past style and explored new challenges'.

Curator Felicity Milburn has identified several stages to Pick's artistic development:

Pick's early work employed imagery sourced from significant moments in Art History, making particular use of the Gothic emblems of the Medieval period. By 1994, however, she had developed her own distinctive and captivatingly personal iconography. Works from this period have been described as 'dreamscapes' in which symbolic images from Pick's memory (beds, dresses, pincushions, colanders) float surreally across rich surfaces. These strangely dislocated objects were often domestic in nature, indicating the special significance memory can inject into otherwise everyday objects.

Shortly after making those works, Pick travelled to Europe, where she found she was again overwhelmed by the immense history of European art. When she returned to New Zealand, she began painting in a very different way, using figures and objects sculpted in the round with greens, blues, warm pinks and browns to explore a new-found sensuality and flesh out a gentle, often naive eroticism.

Milburn notes that ‘the spidery drawing she scratches into the viscous surface of her canvases’ remained a constant in Pick's painting over this time.

In 1997–1998 Pick lectured in painting at the Elam School of Fine Arts In 1999 she was awarded the University of Otago's Frances Hodgkins Fellowship and on completing the residency remained in Dunedin until 2007.

In 2007 art critic Mark Amery noted that 'Even in this day and age Pick's intense focus on the female figure in a psychological landscape makes her something of a lone figure'. He continued:

If other contemporary artists unconsciously stay clear of the depiction of women for the fact that its overexploited, it leaves it to Pick to breed together imagery from fashion and art history in a hothouse, dreamily upsetting mythologies still inherent in our treatment of the female figure.

In 2009 Pick collaborated with writer Jo Randerson on the illustrated book Through The Door, published by Wedge Press. In the same year her work was the subject of a major survey exhibition Séraphine Pick: Tell Me More at Christchurch Art Gallery, curated by Felicity Milburn and toured to City Gallery Wellington and the Dunedin Public Art Gallery. The exhibition was accompanied by a publication with essays by Milburn, Lara Strongman, Andrew Paul Wood and others.

Reviewer James Dignan, writing of Tell Me More in the Otago Daily Times in 2010, described the development of Pick's work as moving

[...] from ghostlike scratches on canvas to full-blooded figurative darkness [showing influences] from Bosch through Redon to Leonor Fini. Through it all, the subterranean undercurrents are a dominant thread, notably in the recent large crowd scenes and solitary figures surrounded by mental echoes of their physical surroundings.

In recent years, Pick has moved from painting the nightmare directly to implying it in a more intangible yet somehow more threatening way. A huge darkness is now present in many of the works – not an absence of light, but a presence of black, a darkness which clearly shows the influence of Goya.

In 2012 Pick produced paintings that were used as the basis for the opening credits for New Zealand director Jane Campion's BBC television series Top of the Lake.

In more recent years, Pick has turned to the internet for her source material for her paintings. Her 2013 exhibition Wankered Again at Michael Lett Gallery (works from which were shown in 2014 at the Ilam Campus Gallery in Christchurch) included paintings that drew on photographs of drunken teenagers that had been posted on the web.

Pick's work has often been interpreted as autobiographical. However, in an interview published in her 2009 monograph Seraphine Pick the artist stated:

I choose images because I like them, not because of any meaning they might have. I might take images from something I've seen or read, or I'll make them up, and that image becomes the starting point. I start adding other things, and that triggers feelings or creates an atmosphere which makes me think of something else. It's quite an organic process: building up different layers of thought, working out ideas on the painting almost on a subconscious level, plaiting the making and the concept together so that the painting process itself creates the content.

In a 2015 interview the artist explained that she is not wedded to any one style or approach to painting:

I keep changing. I don't sit still for long. That's just me exploring painting really. There are just endless possibilities with it. I'm a figurative artist and there's just so many ways you can approach figuration, so I've always tried out lots of different things.

== Exhibitions ==
- 1995 Unveiled, City Gallery Wellington
- 1997 Looking Like Someone Else, Manawatu Art Gallery, Palmerston North
- 1998 Séraphine Pick: Scratching Skin, McDougall Art Annex, Dunedin Public Art Gallery
- 1999 Who Do You Think You Really Are?, window installation, Auckland Art Gallery
- 2000 Display, Blue Oyster Art Project Space, Dunedin
- Where Have You Been?, Hocken Collections, University of Otago, Dunedin
- 2003 Telecom Prospect 2004: New Art New Zealand, City Gallery Wellington
- 2006 Séraphine Pick, Brooke Gifford Gallery, Christchurch
- 2008 Séraphine Pick, Brooke Gifford Gallery, Christchurch
- 2008 After Image, Mahara Gallery, Kapiti and Sarjeant Gallery
- 2009 Séraphine Pick, Brooke Gifford Gallery, Christchurch
- 2009 -2010 Séraphine Pick: Tell Me More, Christchurch Art Gallery, City Gallery Wellington, Dunedin Public Art Gallery
- 2011–2012 Collecting Contemporary, Museum of New Zealand Te Papa Tongarewa
- 2014 Séraphine Pick – Looking like someone else, Pataka Art + Museum, Porirua
- 2014 Séraphine Pick: Wankered, Ilam Campus Gallery, Christchurch
- 2015 Séraphine Pick: White Noise, The Dowse Art Museum, Lower Hutt,
- 2017 Séraphine Pick: Cavewomen, Brett McDowell Gallery, Dunedin,
- 2019 Séraphine Pick: Corporeal, Brett McDowell Gallery, Dunedin,
- 2024 Summer Paintings. Group Exhibition, Gow Langsford, Auckland

== Publications ==
- Jon Bywater, Shadow play : recent paintings by Séraphine Pick, Auckland: Claybrook Gallery, 1994
- Claire Regnault, Unveiled, Wellington: City Gallery Wellington, 1995
- Séraphine Pick, Looking Like Someone Else, Palmerston North: Manawatu Art Gallery, 1997
- Felicity Milburn, Séraphine Pick: Scratching Skin, Christchurch: McDougall Art Annex, 1998
- Susan Ballard, Beyond the surface : Kim Pieters, Maryrose Crook, Séraphine Pick, Dunedin: Dunedin Public Art Gallery, 2001
- Felicity Milburn et al., Séraphine Pick, Christchurch: Christchurch Art Gallery, 2009
- Mark Hutchins-Pond, Looking like someone else, Porirua: Pataka Art + Museum, 2014
- Séraphine Pick: Wankered, Christchurch: Ilam Campus Gallery, 2014
- Sian van Dyk, Megan Dunn, Seraphine Pick: White Noise, Lower Hutt: The Dowse Art Museum, 2015

== Reviews ==
- Peter Simpson, 'Reverie and phantasmagoria : recent paintings by Séraphine Pick', Art New Zealand, no 91, Winter 1999, pp 56–59, 89
- Mark Amery, 'The Culture Vulture: Séraphine Pick at Hamish McKay', The Dominion Post, 2007
- Felicity Milburn, 'Assumed identities : the elusive paintings of Séraphine Pick', Takahe, issue 3, no 65, 2008 pp. 29–34
- Lindsay Rabbitt, 'Imaginary Friends', NZ Listener, 31 May 2008
- John Hurrell, 'From Understated Restraint To Histrionic Excess', Eye Contact, 2009
- Edward Hanfling, 'Séraphine Pick: Torn up phrases', Art New Zealand, no 140, 2011
- TJ McNamara, 'Dream-like visions that glow in the dark', New Zealand Herald, 2011
- Mark Amery, 'Diverse & Copious Pick', Eye Contact, 2011
- John Hurrell, 'The Pains (or Pleasures) of Inebriation', Eye Contact, 2013
- Priscilla Pitts, 'Seraphine Pick White Noise', Art New Zealand, no 155, Spring 2015, p. 39

== Residencies and awards ==
In 1994 Pick was the recipient of the Olivia Spencer Bower Award, and in 1995 she was the Rita Angus Artist in Residence in Wellington. In 1999 she was awarded the Frances Hodgkins Fellowship.

In 2007 Pick won the $20,000 first prize in the Norsewear Art Awards for her painting Phantom Limb.

In 2013 Pick was the inaugural artist in residence at Scots College, Wellington.

== Further information ==
- Stacey Wood, The Pick of the Bunch, The Dominion Post, 8 March 2010
- Seraphine Pick interviewed by Lyn Freeman, 'Standing Room Only', Radio New Zealand National, 21 June 2015
- Tom Cardy, Painter Seraphine Pick takes inspiration from the internet for her new show, The Dominion Post, 1 July 2015
- Seraphine Pick interview, The Dowse Art Museum podcast, 6 August 2015
- Frances Fellows, interview with Seraphine Pick about on 50th anniversary of the Frances Hodgkins Fellowship, 'Standing Room Only', Radio New Zealand National, 23 October 2016
