= Linda James =

New Zealand artist

- Born: Linda Mary James; 1951 (age 74–75); Birmingham, Warwickshire, England
- Occupation: Artist

Linda Mary James (born 1951, Birmingham, England) is an established British artist who has been working in New Zealand for over twenty-five years. She creates large figurative paintings and landscapes.

== Biography ==
Born in Birmingham, at the age of 2 Linda emigrated to New Zealand with her family. She attended the School of Fine Arts, University of Canterbury and in 1983 received a Diploma of Fine Arts (Honours) for painting. She lives and works in North Canterbury, New Zealand.

=== Career as an artist ===
Linda James regularly exhibits her work and recent solo exhibitions include Out of the Chaos: Precious Lives (2007), New Zealand: Sleep in the Forest/Dreams of the Sea (2007), Love Story, Precious Lives II (2009) and Fallen (2010) all at the Centre of Contemporary Art in Christchurch, New Zealand. She has exhibited throughout New Zealand in solo and group shows, including the following galleries: Robert McDougall Gallery, Adam Art Gallery, Judith Anderson Gallery, Jonathan Jensen Gallery, Artline Gallery, Artspace. She has a number of paintings held in the public collection at Te Puna O Waiwhetu/Christchurch Art Gallery.

=== Awards ===
In 1989 James was the recipient of the Olivia Spencer Bower Award, a residency directed specifically at emerging artists. Her work has been recognised in many other award competitions, including:

- 2006 Finalist, Waikato Art Award
- 2005 Finalist, Waikato Art Award
- 2003 Creative New Zealand Grant
- 2002 Artist in Residence - Avonside Girls High School Christchurch
- 1993 Merit Award in Visa Gold Art Awards
- 1990 Participated in the Artists in the Sub- Antarctic Scheme
- 1983 BNZ Art Award (prints), Wellington

== Artistic Style ==
In an early artist's statement James suggested her work was about "...the relationships between time, place and identity (when, where and who)...". Location continues to be an important element for James, and throughout her career the geographic context of New Zealand is evident within her work. Sometimes this is in a literal sense, drawing upon symbols from the New Zealand landscape (such as the native ferns in her exhibition New Zealand: Sleep in the Forest/Dreams of the Sea). Othertimes, James's work speaks to its situation within the context of New Zealand painting, using a palette, scale and modernist aesthetic reminiscent of other New Zealand painters (such as Rita Angus, Nigel Brown and Michael Smither).

Others have noted that her images are drawn from both art historical and media sources. These images are frequently figurative, such as her re-presentations of the portraits of Iraqi soldiers taken from newspapers or scenes of voluptuous and entangled bodies from classical and Renaissance art works, such as in her Discord/ Out of the Chaos series.

== External sources ==
- Linda James's official website
- Linda James's profile on Artists.co.nz
- An online gallery of selected work from 1986 - 1992 by Linda James
- Linda regularly exhibits in solo and group shows at COCA
- McLeod, M. (1991) Three Women in the Sub an Arctic: Helen Mitchell, Gerda Leenards & Linda James, Art New Zealand, 59.
- Budgen, E. (2003) The Rules of Engagement: Linda James' Out of the Chaos, Art New Zealand, 108.
