= Nicola Farquhar =

New Zealand artist

- Born: 1972 (age 53–54); Hamilton, New Zealand
- Education: Elam School of Fine Art
- Known for: Painting

Nicola Farquhar (born 1972) is a New Zealand artist.

Farquhar was born 1972 in Hamilton, New Zealand. She graduated from the Elam School of Fine Art in 2009 with an MFA. She is currently based in Auckland.

Farquhar is a painter, she works primarily in oils on linen. Her paintings often use rich and vibrant colours and she explores traditional portraiture through experimentation with colour, space, and science fiction elements. Through her use of human and botanical forms her works question relationships to the natural work. Although women are usually the subjects of her paintings, they are not based on or named after real people.

Farquhar has exhibited in both solo and grow shows in New Zealand, Australia, and Hong Kong. Notable exhibitions include:

- Discoveries, Art Basel, Hong Kong (2014)
- Method and Gesture, Utopian Slumps, Melbourne (2013)
- New Revised Edition, City Gallery, Wellington (2013)
- Porous Moonlight, Papakura Art Gallery (2013)
- Necessary Distraction: A Painting Show, Auckland Art Gallery Toi o Tāmaki (2015), with Saskia Leek, Julian Hooper, Stella Corkery, Kirstin Carlin, and James Cousins

Farquhar is represented by the Hopkinson Mossman gallery in Auckland and has exhibited with them for over five years.

Work by Farquhar is held in the Auckland Art Gallery Toi o Tāmaki.
