= Emma Wicksteed =

New Zealand woman artist

- Born: Emma Ancilla Barton c. 1811
- Died: 6 November 1869 (aged 58); Whanganui
- Resting place: Heads Road Cemetery, Whanganui
- Known for: painting, drawing
- Spouse: John Tylston Wicksteed
- Children: 2

Emma Ancilla Wicksteed (née Barton; c. 1811 – 6 November 1869) was a New Zealand artist.

== Biography ==
Wicksteed was born about 1811 as Emma Ancilla Barton. She married John Tylston Wicksteed on 17 June 1833 in Hackney, England. They had two sons, John Tylston and Arthur Aikin.

Wicksteed arrived in New Zealand in 1841 after her husband was employed as an agent by the New Zealand Company. She and her family lived at the New Zealand Company Resident Agent's house on Mount Eliot, New Plymouth, now the site of Puke Ariki. In 1853, they moved to Kai Iwi, Whanganui.

Wicksteed sketched and painted landscapes of both New Plymouth and Whanganui. Her sketch New Plymouth in 1843 was reproduced as a coloured lithograph in Jerningham Wakefield's Adventure in New Zealand. It was used by the New Zealand Company to encourage further British settlements in the Taranaki region.

She died in Whanganui on 6 November 1869, age 58, and was buried with her husband in Heads Road Cemetery, Whanganui. Her paintings are now found in the collections of Puke Ariki, the Fletcher Trust, and the National Library of New Zealand.
