= Minor (triptych) =

Postmodern painting by Luise Fong

- Minor (triptych)
- Artist: Luise Fong
- Year: 1994
- Medium: Ink, acrylic and gouache on wooden doors
- Dimensions: 206 cm x 204 cm (102.75 in x 80.3 in)
- Location: Auckland
- Owner: The Fletcher Trust
- Website: https://fletchercollection.org.nz/artworks/minor-triptych/

Minor is an postmodern painting by a Malaysian born New Zealand artist Luise Fong that won the Premier Award at the Visa Gold Art Award in 1994.

== History ==
Visa Gold Art Award were held at the City Gallery Wellington, from 13 August to 5 September 1994. The awards was the biggest art prize in New Zealand at the time. 1994 was the only year where there were two winners of the Premier Award, Fong was joint-winners of the Premier Award with Bill Hammond.

== Description ==
This triptych is representative of her artistic practice, exploring delicate surfaces that may stem from her background as a textile designer. During this period, Fong created her paintings on doors, giving them a relatable scale in relation to the human body. The doors are adorned with blots, stains, and holes, creating a dynamic visual experience that never allows the viewer's eye to rest. These elements contribute to a distinctive fluidity in her work, which is intentionally perceived as feminine, especially in contrast to the hard-edge abstraction often associated with her male predecessors. The musical title reinforces the emotional response elicited from the viewer.

Fong and Bill Hammond can be seen posing together in a photograph in The Press newspaper about the Visa Gold Art Awards. Fong and Minor can be seen in The Dominion newspaper.

The painting was also part of the exhibition Cultural Safety: Contemporary Art from New Zealand, in Frankfurter Kunstverein in Germany (1995), and City Gallery Wellington in New Zealand (1995–1996).

Minor is held in the collection of Fletcher Trust in Auckland, New Zealand.
