= Stella Corkery =

New Zealand artist

- Born: 1960 (age 65–66); Tuatapere, New Zealand
- Education: Elam School of Fine Art, University of Auckland (MFA, BFA [Hons])
- Known for: Painting, Sculpture
- Movement: Abstract, experimental, riot grrrl
- Partner: Alan Holt

Stella Corkery (born 1960) is a New Zealand visual artist and drummer, born in Tuatapere, New Zealand. Corkery's work is experimental and reflective, often commenting on contemporary ideas. She currently lives and works in Auckland, New Zealand.

== Education ==
Corkery attended the Elam School of Fine Art (University of Auckland) where she received a BFA (Hons) First Class Honors in 2012 and Master of Fine Arts (MFA) in 2013.

== Visual art ==
Corkery's paintings use traditional processes, such as oils, although she doesn't restrict herself to a particular style. Her visual works include Smoke and Butterfly (2015) and Gas Light (2015).

In 2013 Corkery was selected to be part of the exhibition Freedom Farmers: New Zealand Artists Growing Ideas at the Auckland Art Gallery Toi o Tamaki. This exhibition showcased twenty New Zealand contemporary artists from various media, reflecting on concept such as utopia, sustainability, and artistic freedom.

Corkery's recent exhibitions in New Zealand include: Necessary Distraction: a painting show (Auckland Art Gallery Toi o Tamaki, 2015, with Saskia Leek, Julian Hooper, Nicola Farquhar, Kirstin Carlin, and James Cousins); Porous Moonlight (Papakura Art Gallery, 2013); and Episodic Nomadic (Gloria Knight, Auckland, 2013). She has held several exhibitions at the Michael Lett gallery including: Theme for a Science Fiction Vampire (2017), Sparks (2015), Kicking Against The Pricks (2014), and a joint show with Jim Allen & Dan Arps (2016). Corkery has also exhibited outside New Zealand including Caravan (2014) at the Station Gallery in Melbourne, Australia, Patches (2017) and Keep Smiling the Boss Loves Idiots (2016), at Poppy's in New York, USA.

== Music ==
Corkery is a self-taught drummer and has been involved in the underground music scene since the late 1980s. She has been part of experimental, noise and lo-fi bands including Angelhead, Queen Meanie Puss, and White Saucer. Her first band, The Pleats, was formed in Dunedin around 1980 with Rachel Shearer (Lovely Midget, which Corkery was also a member of) and Debbie Hinden (Indigo Underworld).

=== Labels ===
In the early 1990s she started the Pink Air and Girl Alliance record labels with her partner Alan Holt. Both labels were created to support musicians in Auckland, with The Pink Air label focusing experimental and psychedelic music and Girl Alliance part of the riot grrrl movement.

=== Discography ===
Band	Album	Date	Credits
White Saucer	Phoenix EP		Drums
White Saucer	Black Patrol	2009	Drums
Arrows	Ashes	2008	Drums
Arrows	Holiday 93	2008	Drums
Queen Meanie Puss	25th Anniversary Box Set	2007	Drums
White Saucer	Mars Attax Remix	2006	Drums
Queen Meanie Puss	Tard & Furthered	2005	Drums
Queen Meanie Puss	Where In The World Is Wendy Broccoli? (compilation – song 'Contracts')	2005	Drums, written by
Fake Purr	Bad Horsey	2002	Drums, vocals
Lovely Midget	Lovely Midget	2000	Synthesizer
White Saucer	White Saucer	1999	Drums, artwork, synth
Sweetcakes (solo project)	Pink Drums	1997	Percussion
White Saucer	Untitled tape – song 'HB Soul Practice (Edit)'	1997	Drums
Sooty and Sweet	Shrew'd (compilation – song 'Inch Deep')	1993	Drums
Queen Meanie Puss	The Darkling	1992	Drums
Queen Meanie Puss	The Beauty of Dogs	1991	Drums
Queen Meanie Puss	I heard the Devil call my Name	1991	Drums
Angelhead	Eat	1990	Drums
