= Luise Fong =

Malaysian-born New Zealand artist (born 1964)

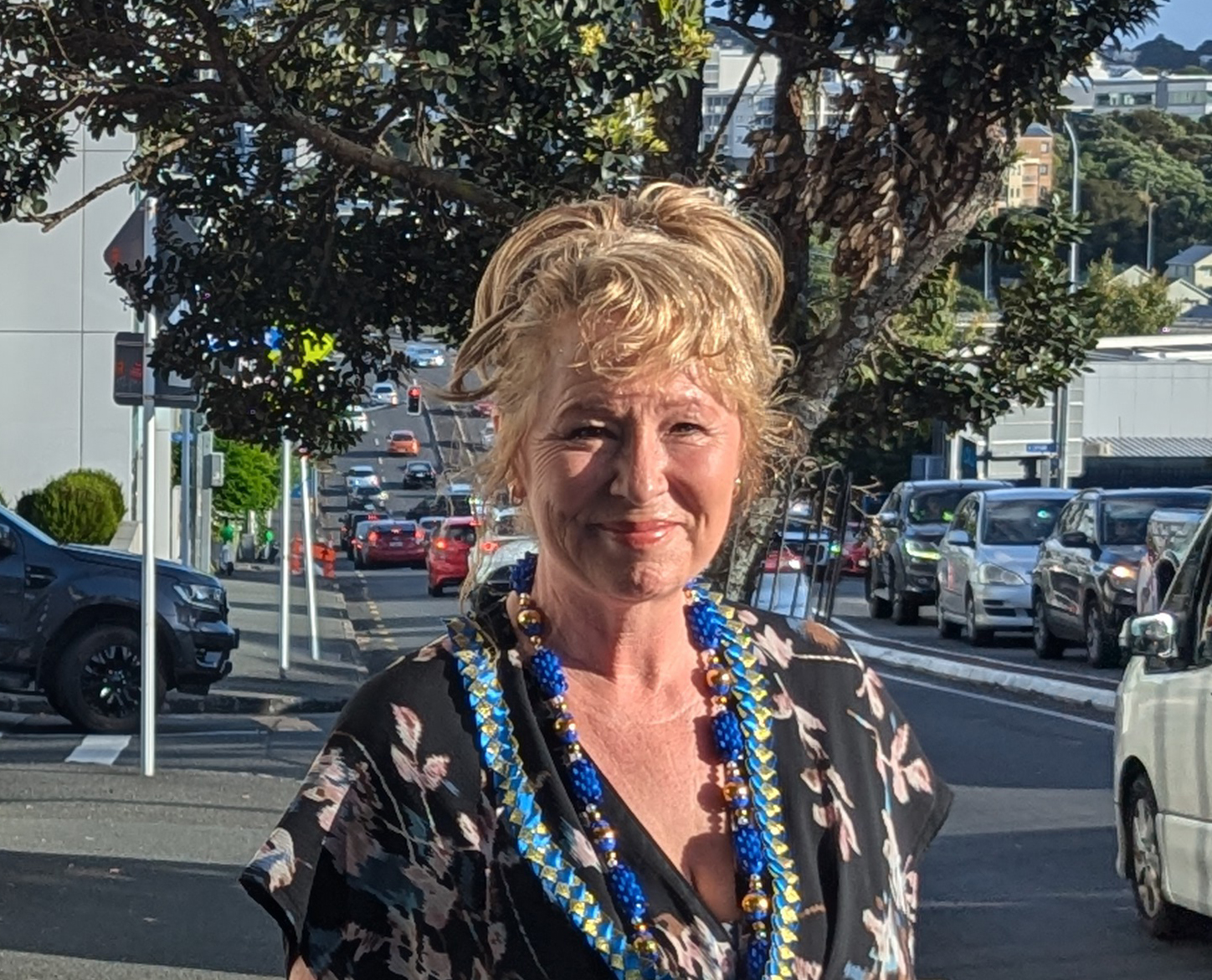
- Fong in 2024
- Born: Luise Tet Fong; 1964 (age 61–62); Sandakan, Malaysia
- Education: University of Auckland's Elam School of Fine Arts (B.F.A.)
- Known for: painting
- Notable work: "Blatant Cosmos" 1993 "Minor (triptych)" 1994 "Dragon" 1995 "Wave" 2009 "1850" 2007-2015
- Style: abstraction
- Awards: 1994 Premier Award winner, Visa Gold Art Awards (co-winners with Bill Hammond)

Luise Fong (born 1964) is a Malaysian-born New Zealand artist, known for her feminine organic abstract shapes in contrast to the hard-edge abstraction often associated with her male predecessors.

Fong was born in Sandakan, Malaysia, and moved to Auckland, New Zealand, at a young age. In 1983, she started study at the Wellington Polytechnic for textile design. She was later accepted into University of Auckland's Elam School of Fine Arts in 1986, and was graduated with Bachelor of Fine Arts in print-making in 1989.

Fong was lecturing at Elam School of Fine Arts between 1993 and 1994, and in 1994, she was granted artist-in-residence at University of Melbourne's Victorian College of the Arts.

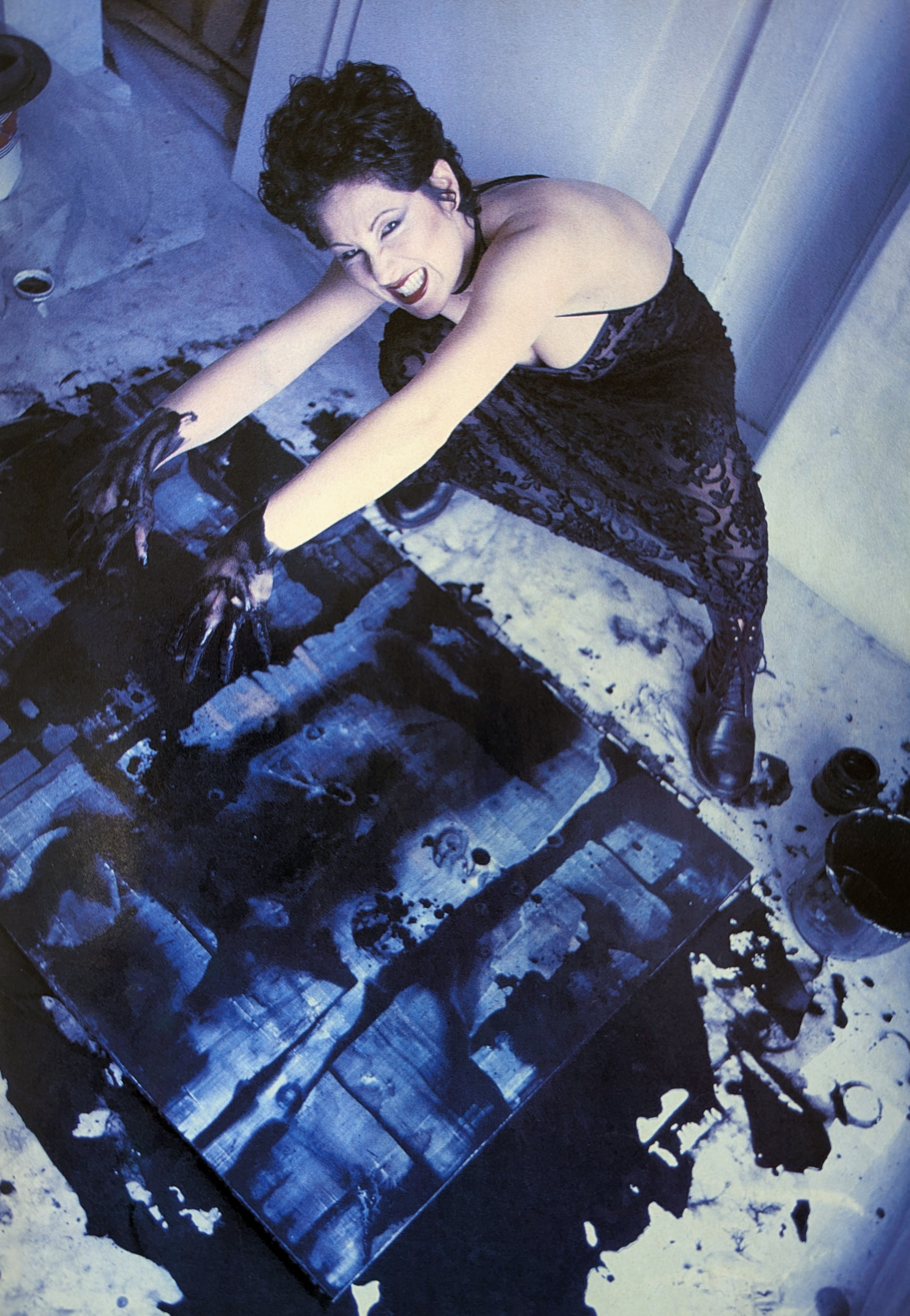
Luise Fong in studio, Auckland, New Zealand, 1995

In 1994, Fong was the joint Premier Award winners with Bill Hammond for the Visa Gold Art Award, the largest art prize in New Zealand at the time. Fong moved to Melbourne in 1995, and worked there until 2001, when she was made a lecturer in painting at University of Auckland's Elam School of Fine Arts. She was working there until 2005.

Her work was part of several important international exhibitions, including Cultural Safety: Contemporary Art from New Zealand, in Frankfurter Kunstverein in Germany (1995) and Trans/fusion: Hong Kong artists' exchange, Hong Kong Arts Centre and Auckland Art City Gallery (1996).

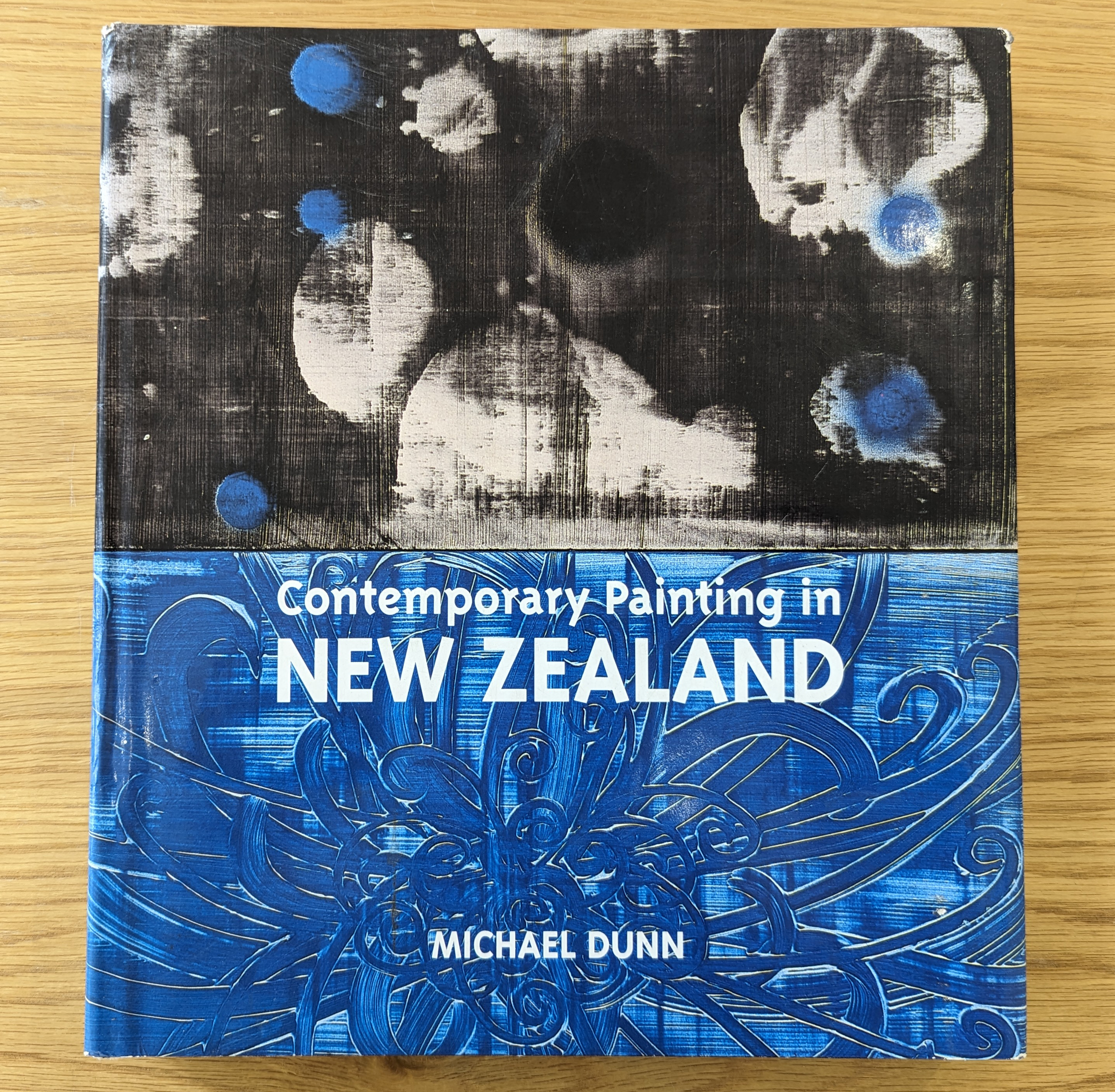
Luise Fong's Blatant Cosmos (1993) on the cover of Contemporary Painting in New Zealand (1996) by Michael Dunn

Fong has held many residency positions; including a residency at the Govett-Brewster Art Gallery in 1995, and University of Canterbury in 1999. Fong was artist in residence at the McCahon House Residency in Titirangi in 2008.

In 2020, Fong discovered a missing painting by Dame Louise Henderson, in Mount Albert Grammar School. Fong attended a function event, and was given a tour of their G J Moyal Collection. Art Galleries throughout Auckland and Christchurch were trying to locate April from The "Twelve Months" series for the exhibition Louise Henderson: From Life. Fong recognised the style and suspected it could be the missing painting, which it turned out to be.

== Minor ==
Minor, also known as Minor (triptych), is an best known artwork by Fong that won the Premier Award at the Visa Gold Art Award in 1994. The awards were held at the City Gallery Wellington, from 13 August to 5 September 1994. Visa Gold Art Award was the biggest art prize in New Zealand at the time. 1994 was the only year where there were two winners selected for the Premier Award, Fong was joint-winners of the Premier Award with Bill Hammond. The painting was also part of the exhibition Cultural Safety: Contemporary Art from New Zealand, in Frankfurter Kunstverein in Germany (1995), and City Gallery Wellington in New Zealand (1995–1996).

Minor is a representative of her artistic practice, exploring delicate surfaces that may stem from her background as a textile designer. During this period, Fong created her paintings on doors, giving them a relatable scale in relation to the human body. The doors are adorned with blots, stains, and holes, creating a dynamic visual experience that never allows the viewer's eye to rest. These elements contribute to a distinctive fluidity in her work, which is intentionally perceived as feminine, especially in contrast to the hard-edge abstraction often associated with her male predecessors. The musical title reinforces the emotional response elicited from the viewer. Minor is held in the Fletcher Trust Collection in Auckland, New Zealand.

== Collections ==
Her work is held in numerous private and major public collections throughout New Zealand, including Museum of New Zealand Te Papa Tongarewa, Auckland Art Gallery, Auckland War Memorial Museum, Dunedin Public Art Gallery, Govett-Brewster Art Gallery, Christchurch Art Gallery, Te Manawa Museum, University of Auckland, Fletcher Trust, Chartwell Trust, McCahon House Trust, University of Canterbury, and Dame Jenny Gibbs Collection.

== Selected Awards ==
- 1994: New Zealand Premier Award Winner, Visa Gold Art Award (with Bill Hammond)
- 1993: New Zealand Merit Award Winner, Visa Gold Art Award
- 1993: Ida Else Painting Award, Auckland Society of Arts

== Selected Residencies ==
- 2008: McCahon House Artist Residency, McCahon Trust, Titirangi, Auckland, New Zealand
- 1997: Artist in Residence, University of Canterbury, Christchurch, New Zealand
- 1995: Artist in Residence, Govett-Brewster Art Gallery, New Plymouth, New Zealand
- 1994: Artist in Residence, Victoria College of the Arts, Melbourne, Australia

== Selected solo exhibitions ==
- 2024: Nexus, Bergman Gallery, Auckland, New Zealand
- 2019: Review, North Art Gallery, Auckland, New Zealand
- 2017: Interplay, Antoinette Godkin Gallery, Auckland, New Zealand
- 2015: Requiem, Antoinette Godkin Gallery, Auckland, New Zealand
- 2009: How to Talk Tree, Lopdell House Gallery, Auckland, New Zealand
- 2007: Jonathan Smart Gallery, Christchurch, New Zealand
- 2004: Elemental, Starkwhite, Auckland, New Zealand
- 2002: Turbo, Jonathan Smart Gallery, Christchurch, New Zealand
- 1999: Universe, McDougall Contemporary Art Annexe, Christchurch, New Zealand
- 1999: Transit, Robert Lindsay Gallery, Melbourne, Australia
- 1998: Recent Paintings, Anna Bibby Gallery, Auckland, New Zealand
- 1998: Sonar, John Batten Gallery, Hong Kong
- 1997: Chamber, Robert Lindsay Gallery, Melbourne, Australia
- 1995: More Human, Govett-Brewster Art Gallery, New Plymouth; Fisher Gallery, Auckland, New Zealand
- 1993: Chen, Claybrook Gallery, Auckland, New Zealand
- 1992: Speak (window installation), Auckland City Art Gallery, Auckland, New Zealand
- 1989: Past Presence, Fish Shop Gallery, Auckland, New Zealand

== Selected group exhibitions ==
- 2025: Toi Art: Museum of New Zealand Te Papa Tongarewa, Wellington, New Zealand
- 2025: Aotearoa Art Fair, Bergman Gallery, Viaduct Events Centre, Auckland, New Zealand
- 2024: Generation X: 50 Artworks from the Chartwell Collection, Museum of New Zealand Te Papa Tongarewa, Wellington, New Zealand
- 2024: Feminine/Abstract, Te Manawa Museum, Palmerston North, New Zealand
- 2024: Belonging: Stories of Contemporary New Zealand Asian Artists, Bergman Gallery, Auckland, New Zealand
- 2024: ABSTRAXT ABSTRAXT, North Art Gallery, Auckland, New Zealand
- 2024: Aotearoa Art Fair, Bergman Gallery, Viaduct Events Centre, Auckland, New Zealand
- 2023: Horizon, Bergman Gallery, Auckland, New Zealand
- 2023: A Place to Call Home - Contemporary New Zealand Asian Art, Bergman Gallery, Auckland, New Zealand
- 2016: Bodywork, Dunedin Public Art Gallery, Dunedin, New Zealand
- 2007: Painting: One. Two Rooms Gallery, Auckland, New Zealand
- 2007: Ae AM, Tinakori Gallery, Wellington, New Zealand
- 2005: Winter, Ngamatau Gallery, Queenstown, New Zealand
- 2004: HOME/GROUND-SCAPE Biennial 04, Christchurch, New Zealand
- 2003: Pressing Flesh: Skin, Touch, Intimacy, Auckland Art Gallery, Auckland, New Zealand
- 1999: Contemporary Melbourne Abstraction, Heide Art Gallery, New Plymouth, New Zealand
- 1996: Cultural Safety: Contemporary Art from New Zealand, Frankfurter Kunstverein, Germany
- 1996: Referencing, Robert Lindsay Gallery, Melbourne, Australia
- 1996: Trans/fusion: Hong Kong artists' exchange, Auckland Art Gallery, Auckland, New Zealand
- 1995: Trans/fusion: Hong Kong artists' exchange, Hong Kong Arts Centre, Hong Kong
- 1994: Taking Stock of the Nineties, Sarjeant Gallery, Whanganui, New Zealand
- 1994: Station to Station: The Way of the Cross, Auckland City Art Gallery, Auckland, New Zealand
- 1992: Light Sensitive, Artspace, Auckland, New Zealand
- 1992: After Dark, Wellington City Gallery, Wellington, New Zealand
- 1992: After Dark, Govett-Brewster Art Gallery, New Plymouth, New Zealand
- 1992: Shadow of Style: Eight New Artists, Wellington City Gallery, Wellington, New Zealand
- 1992: Shadow of Style: Eight New Artists, Govett-Brewster Art Gallery, New Plymouth, New Zealand
- 1992: Surface Tension: Ten Artists in the Nineties, Auckland City Art Gallery, Auckland, New Zealand
- 1991: Speaking Through the Crack in the Mirror, Artspace, Auckland, New Zealand
- 1990: Pandora’s Box, George Fraser Gallery, Auckland, New Zealand
- 1989: Fascination. Brooker Gallery, Wellington, New Zealand
- 1988: 20,000 Leagues, Fish Shop Gallery, Auckland, New Zealand
