= Catherine Manchester =

New Zealand artist and painter (born 1957)

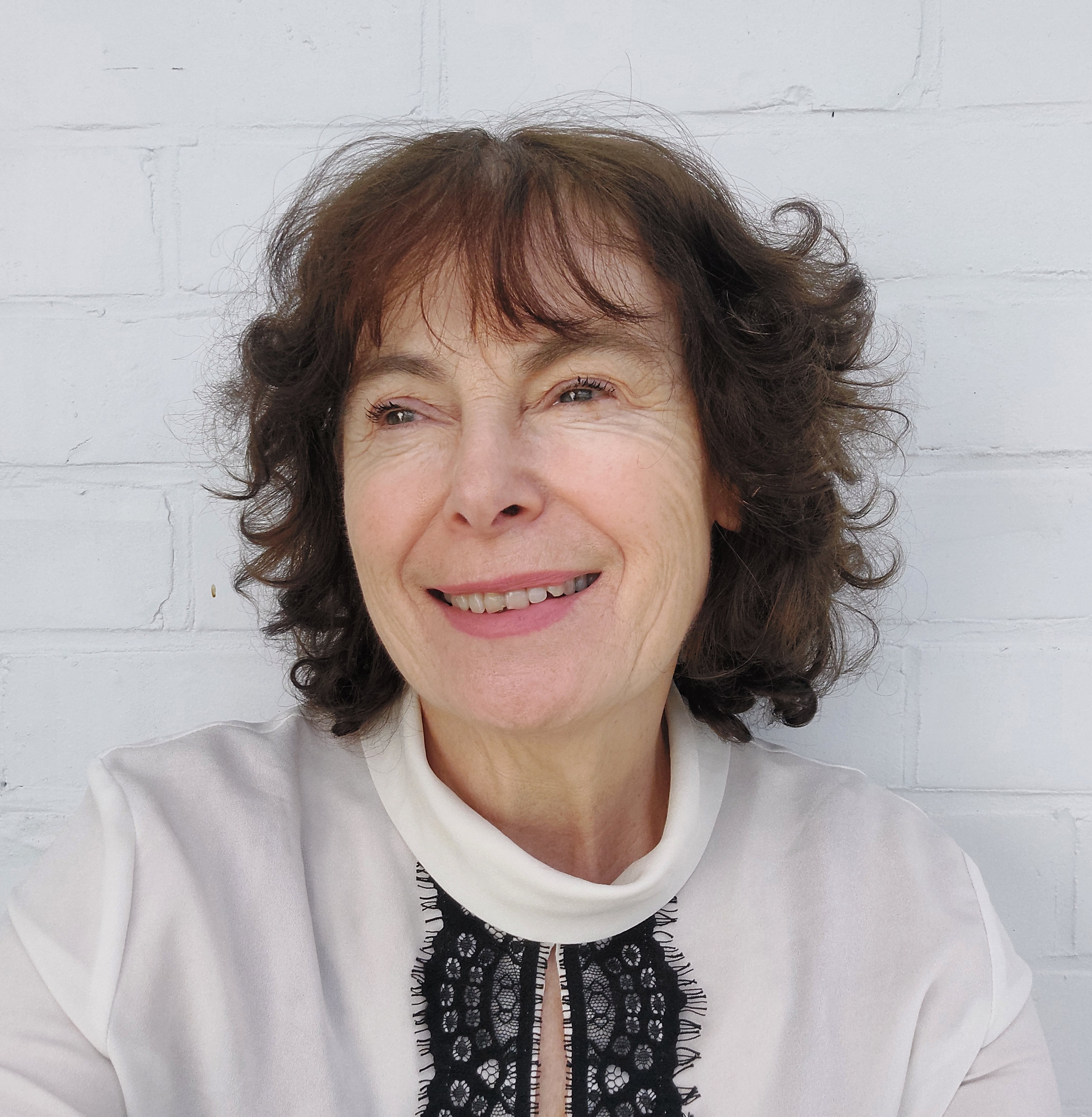
- Born: 1957 (age 68–69); Auckland, New Zealand
- Education: Victoria University of Wellington; University of Canterbury; Otago Polytechnic
- Awards: Rita Angus Residency (1987)

Catherine Manchester (born 1957) is a New Zealand painter. She works in oils, acrylics and watercolours. One of her artworks is held in the permanent collection of Aigantighe Art Gallery.

== Biography ==
Manchester was born in Auckland and completed a Bachelor of Arts degree in literature at Victoria University of Wellington. She studied at the Ilam School of Fine Arts at the University of Canterbury from 1979 and graduated with a Diploma in Fine Arts from Otago Polytechnic in 1984.

In 1986, Manchester was a recipient of a Creative New Zealand Grant, and in 1987, she was awarded the Rita Angus Residency.

In 2023, she moved to Christchurch and became involved with Arts Canterbury’s Open Art Studio programme.

In 2024, Manchester was being treated for cancer, but was writing a novel. The laptop containing her work was stolen from her home and she was forced to begin writing again. The book titled Sunshine Road was published in 2026. It is a semi-autobiographical work set in Christchurch and Eastbourne, Lower Hutt during the 1960s and 1970s.
