= Olivia Spencer Bower Award =

Residency award for artists

The Olivia Spencer Bower Award is a residency opportunity for New Zealand artists. It is named after the 20th-century New Zealand painter Olivia Spencer Bower.

== About the residency ==
The Olivia Spencer Bower Award was established in 1987. Art critic John Daly-Peoples notes that it was Spencer Bower's intention to "provide talented artists an opportunity to work for one year, free to pursue their own direction without the need to seek outside employment."

The award was initially intended to support women artists only. Final details for the charitable foundation were only finalised five days before the artist died in early July 1982. Bower left all her art works to the foundation, and these have been gradually realised by the trustees to form the capital which entirely funds the award. The award is directed at emerging painters and sculptors and bypasses well-known and established practitioners who may have already received recognition. While the initial instigation for the foundation was perceived inequity between male and female artists the award is open to both men and women artists. Selection is made by a committee which must include at least half females.

Art critic Warren Feeney writes of the award:

Set up by a practising artist as an award for other practising artists its success can be measured in the number of recipients who continue to maintain a substantial presence in the arts. Séraphine Pick, Jim Speers and Kristy Gorman are only three of a very long list. Indeed, rather than her legacy as a painter, the Olivia Spencer Bower Foundation Award has become the vehicle by which the artist is now best-known.

The residency is based in Christchurch, though it is open to artists from around the country. The recipient receives a stipend for the year — currently around $NZ30,000 — and a studio in Christchurch for the year of the residency. Until 2011, the studio was located within the complex of the Christchurch Arts Centre, but since the Arts Centre was damaged in the February 2011 Christchurch Earthquake other studio space was sourced for the time period. Jen Alexandra is the 2024 award recipient.

== Recipients ==
- 1987 Pauline Rhodes
- 1988 Grant Banbury
- 1989 Linda James
- 1990 Joanna Braithwaite
- 1991 No award
- 1992 Ruth Watson
- 1993 Sandra Thomson
- 1994 Séraphine Pick
- 1995 Chris Heaphy
- 1996 Esther Leigh
- 1997 Saskia Leek
- 1998 Jim Speers
- 1999 Kirsty Gregg
- 2000 James Cousins
- 2001 Kirsty Gorman
- 2002 Marcus Moore
- 2003 Bekah Carran
- 2004 Hannah Beehre
- 2005 Victoria Bell
- 2006 Joanna Langford
- 2007 Robert Hood
- 2008 Eddie Clemens
- 2009 Clare Noonan
- 2010 Cat Auburn
- 2011 Georgina E. Hill
- 2012 Laura Marsh
- 2013 Miranda Parkes
- 2014 Emma Fitts
- 2015 Jacquelyn Greenbank
- 2016 Christina Read
- 2017 Daegan Wells
- 2018 Tyne Gordon
- 2019 Kim Lowe
- 2020 Annie McKenzie
- 2022 Amanda Newall
- 2023 Isabella Loudon
- 2024 Jen Alexandra
