= Lynley Edmeades =

New Zealand poet, academic and editor

- Born: Putāruru, New Zealand
- Occupation: Editor of Landfall; poet; academic
- Education: Queen's University of Belfast (MA, creative writing); University of Otago (PhD, avant-garde poetry)

Academic background
- Thesis: The Hear and Now: Sound and Technology in the Avant-Garde Poetics of Gertrude Stein, John Cage, and Caroline Bergvall (2017)

Lynley Carol Edmeades is a New Zealand poet, academic and editor. She has published two poetry collections and held a number of writers' residencies. As of 2024 she is the editor of the New Zealand literary journal Landfall.

== Biography ==
Edmeades was born in Putāruru. She has an MA in creative writing from the Seamus Heaney Centre for Poetry at the Queen's University of Belfast and a PhD in avant-garde poetry from the University of Otago. In 2009 she was the first recipient of the Lavinia Winter Fellowship.

Her first poetry collection, As the Verb Tenses (2016), was long-listed for the Mary and Peter Biggs Award for Poetry at the Ockham New Zealand Book Awards and shortlisted for the UNESCO Bridges of Struga Best First Book of Poetry at the Struga Poetry Evenings festival. Cordite Poetry Review described it as "a rare debut collection of poems that dazzles and delights with a profane, childlike wisdom".

Her second poetry collection, Listening In (2019), was long-listed for the Mary and Peter Biggs Poetry Award at the Ockham New Zealand Book Awards. Claire Lacey for Landfall Review Online praised it as a "celebration of poetic craft" which "rewards the attentive reader through the accretion of linkages and lineages throughout the text".

In 2018, Edmeades was the Ursula Bethell Writer in Residence at the University of Canterbury and Artist in Residence at Massey University. In 2017 she received a highly commended award in the Landfall Essay Competition, and she has also been shortlisted for the Calibre Prize. In 2016 and 2018 her works were selected for inclusion in the Best New Zealand Poems series.

As of 2024, Edmeades teaches poetry and creative writing at the University of Otago. In April 2021 she was announced to be the new editor of New Zealand literary magazine Landfall. The first issue she edited was issue 242 in spring 2021.

In 2022, Bordering on the Miraculous was published, a collaboration between Edmeades and painter Saskia Leek.

== Selected works ==
- As the Verb Tenses (Otago University Press, 2016)
- Listening In (Otago University Press, 2019)
- Bordering on the Miraculous with painter Saskia Leek (Massey University Press, 2022)
