= Rita Angus Residency =

Artist residency programme in Wellington

The Rita Angus Residency in Wellington, New Zealand, is an opportunity for artists to live in the former home of Rita Angus, one of New Zealand’s best-known painters, while creating a body of new work.

== About the Residency ==
The Rita Angus Cottage at 194A Sydney Street West in the Wellington suburb of Thorndon was built in 1877. Rita Angus lived there from 1955 until her death in 1970.

The Heritage New Zealand entry for the cottage (registered as a Category 1 Historic Place) reads: "Many paintings of the house, the garden, the Bolton Street Cemetery and the buildings of the neighbourhood attest to the great influence this place had on the life of the artist."

In 1984, the cottage was purchased by the Thorndon Trust with the intent of providing accommodation for artists visiting Wellington, either for short periods or to work on particular projects.

In 2006, Massey University’s College of Creative Arts partnered with the Thorndon Trust to launch the inaugural Massey University Rita Angus Visual Arts Residency, enabling both New Zealand and international artists to live at the cottage and develop a body of work.

In 2010, WelTec partnered with the Thorndon Trust to resurrect the residency, with support from Creative New Zealand. The residency guidelines required artists to submit proposals for a project they would like to complete while living at the cottage, with a brief to "localise the concepts 'technology' and 'culture' in the context of Aotearoa/New Zealand".

== Past recipients ==
- 2012 Glen Hayward
- 2011 Residency shared by Ben Cauchi and Andre Hemer
- 2010 Wayne Youle
- 2008 Ronnie van Hout
- 1997 Ani O'Neill
- 1995 Séraphine Pick and Gary Freemantle
- 1994 Stephanie Sheehan
- 1993 Joanna Margaret Paul and Charlotte Fisher
- 1991 Jane Zusters
- 1989 Gary Freemantle
- 1987 Catherine Manchester
- 1985 Tony Fomison (first residency)

Other past residents include Jenny Dolezell, Nicola Jackson, Yvonne Rust, and Michael Tuffery.
