= Fletcher Trust =

New Zealand charitable trust associated with Fletcher Building

- Formation: 4 September 1980; 45 years ago
- Type: charitable trust
- Purpose: Educational philanthropy, managing Fletcher Trust art collection, managing Fletcher Archives
- Headquarters: Fletcher House, Great South Road
- Location: Penrose, Auckland, New Zealand
- Region served: New Zealand
- Chair: Angus Fletcher
- Main organ: Board of Trustees
- Affiliations: Fletcher Building; Fletcher Challenge; Fletcher Holdings
- Website: www.fletchertrust.co.nz
- Formerly called: Fletcher Holdings Charitable Trust, Fletcher Challenge Charitable Trust, Fletcher Challenge Trust

The Fletcher Trust is a charitable trust in New Zealand. Established in 1980, it grew from a philanthropic trust that had provided medical and educational benefits for employees of the construction company Fletcher Holdings. In 2002 the trust became an independent charitable trust organisation, focusing on educational philanthropy for projects in New Zealand.

The trust manages both the Fletcher Trust Archives and the Fletcher Trust Collection. The Fletcher Trust Archives are the largest corporate archives in New Zealand, focusing on material related to Fletcher construction projects and business activities dating back to 1911. The Fletcher Trust Collection is an art collection which includes nearly 600 artworks by over 250 artists, primarily focused on the New Zealand arts scene. The Trust also owns and funds Fletcher House, a historic house museum in Broad Bay, Dunedin.

== History ==
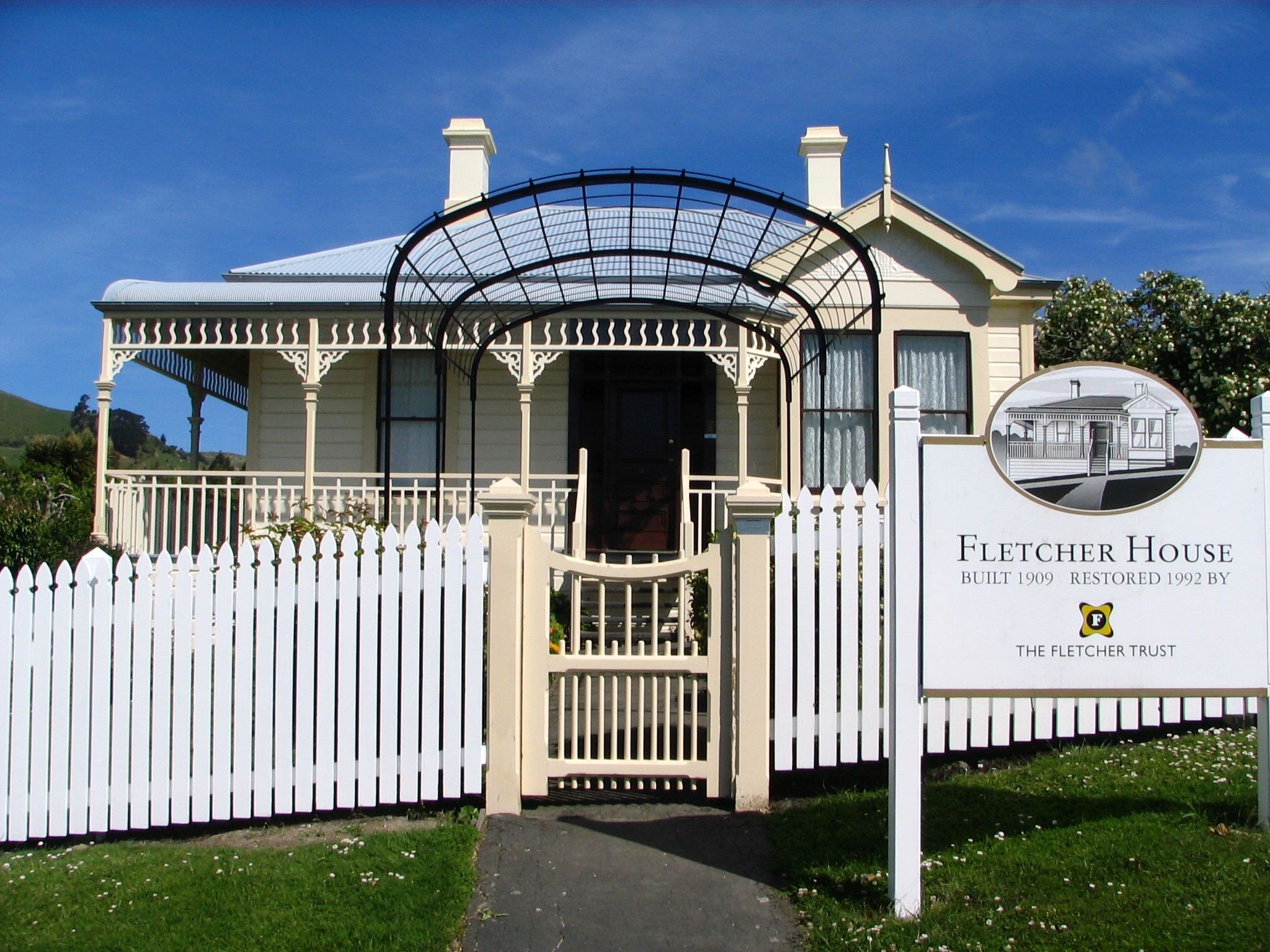
Fletcher House in Broad Bay, Dunedin, was purchased by Fletcher Holdings in 1991 and is owned by Fletcher Trust

The Fletcher Holdings Charitable Trust was established in 1980, expanding the scope of a philanthropic trust that operated in the 1970s, that took surplus funds from Fletcher Holdings' superannuation scheme, that focused on providing medical and educational benefits for Fletcher employees. The first chairman of the trust was James Fletcher Jnr, joined by a board composed of three senior executives of Fletcher Holdings. During the 1980s, the trust focused on funding community events and organisations, such as the Rotorua Marathon and the Canterbury Aged People's Welfare Council.

In 1981, the trust was renamed the Fletcher Challenge Charitable Trust after merger of Fletcher Holdings, Challenge Construction and Tasman Pulp & Paper. The trust was renamed in 1990, becoming the Fletcher Challenge Trust.

In 1990, Fletcher Building and the Fletcher Challenge Trust purchased the Fletcher House Dunedin, the first building contracted to James Fletcher, founder of Fletcher Construction. The house was restored in collaboration with Toitū Otago Settlers Museum and the Dunedin Botanic Garden, reopened to the public in 1992 as a historic house museum.

In 1999 and 2000, the trust collaborated with Independent Schools of New Zealand and the Ministry of Education to fund the Living Values project, a trial project focused on ethics and values education in New Zealand schools.

Between 2001 and 2002, during the split of Fletcher Challenge, the trust became an independent body separate from Fletcher Building, and was renamed the Fletcher Trust. During this period, the trust downsized operations.

== Governance and scope ==
It is governed by a board, currently composed of people who have had strong connections with Fletcher-related companies during their lives. As of 2025, the board includes chairman Angus Fletcher, David Sixton, John Hood and Hugh Fletcher. The trust focuses on three major goals: educational philanthropy, managing the Fletcher Trust Archives, and managing the art collection of the Fletcher Trust. As a part of the trust's focus on educational philanthropy, the organisation funds projects to develop educational leadership skills through the Springboard Trust, recruit and development of teachers through Ako Mātātupu: Teach First NZ and the University of Auckland's Faculty of Education and Social Work, improving education through the Education Hub, and developing entrepreneurial skills for youth through the Young Enterprise Trust.

== Fletcher Trust Archives ==
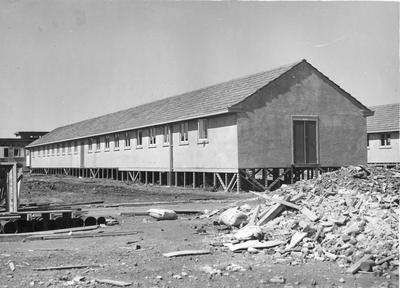
The US Army 39th General Hospital under construction at Cornwall Park, Auckland (c. 1942), from the Fletcher Trust Archives

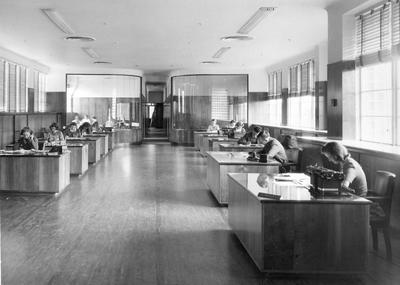
Interior of Fletcher Offices (c. 1940), from the Fletcher Trust Archives

The Fletcher Trust Archives are the largest corporate archives in New Zealand. Located in Penrose, Auckland, the archive was established in 1986 with assistance of Archives New Zealand, originally beginning as the corporate information services of Fletcher Challenge, focused on preserving the records of the three major constituent companies of Fletcher Challenge (Fletcher Holdings, Challenge Corporation and Tasman Pulp & Paper), as well as businesses ventures and construction projects related to the companies. The oldest material in the archives dates to 1862.

In 2001 during the corporate split of Fletcher Challenge, the ownership of the archive was transferred to the Fletcher Trust. Under the administration of the Fletcher Trust, the trust is tasked with preserving the records of the archive, and providing public access. Content from the archives have formed much of the basis of books focused on Fletcher-related topics, including Battle of the Titans: Sir Ronald Trotter, Hugh Fletcher and the Rise and Fall of Fletcher Challenge (2001) by Bruce Wallace, Fletchers: a centennial history of Fletcher Building (2009) by Paul Goldsmith, Pride of Place: a history of the Fletcher Construction Company (2009) by Peter Shaw, No Job Too Big (2009) by Jack Smith, and a second volume in the series, entitled No Job Too Hard, published in 2014.

== Fletcher Trust Collection ==
The Fletcher Trust Collection (formerly known as the Fletcher Challenge Art Collection) is a major private art collection managed by the Fletcher Trust. Focused on New Zealand art, the collection includes approximately 600 works by over 250 artists. The collection is primarily stored and displayed at the Fletcher Building offices in Penrose, Auckland, as well as at Government House, Auckland and Government House, Wellington.

The collection began in 1962, due to senior management assistant George Fraser advocating for fine art to elevate the tone of Fletcher Holdings corporate offices, which up until this point had been decorated with calendars, inexpensive posters or were left blank. In early 1962, James Fletcher Jnr was contacted by art dealer Peter Webb, asking if the company was interested in purchasing a set of five watercolours of New Zealand scenes painted by John Hoyte, which were hung in the dining room of Fletcher Holdings. Fletcher Holdings focused on collecting 19th century artworks in the 1960s, including more watercolours by Hoyte, as well as works by Charles Blomfield, John Gully and John Kinder.

After Fletcher Holdings moved to new offices in 1967, this led to a greater need for the company to procure new artworks to cover the additional wall space. During this time, an informal arts committee was formed by George Fraser, which included Fraser, James Fletcher Jnr, Fletcher's wife Vaughan Fletcher, and their son Hugh Fletcher, and the collection gradually grew. The development of the collection led other major New Zealand institutions to begin New Zealand art collections, including the Bank of New Zealand, Challenge Corporation, Databank Systems and New Zealand Insurance.

During the 1981 merger of Fletcher Holdings with Challenge Corporation and the creation of Fletcher Challenge, art that had previously been owned by the Challenge Corporation was incorporated into this collection. From 1981 to 1991, the company had two separate art collections in Auckland and Wellington, and continued to search for works from the New Zealand arts scene to purchase. The Auckland collection continued to be curated by the art committee, and was operated by Petar Vuletic of Petar/James Gallery, later by John Gow of Gow Langsford Gallery. By 1986, Vaughan Fletcher had become the curator of the collection, assisted by Gow. The second collection was based in Wellington at the former Challenge Corporation headquarters, curated by Margaret Trotter, her husband Ron Trotter, and Jack Hodgetts, formerly of the Challenge Corporation. At the time of Fraser's death in 1986, the collection had become the largest private art collection held in New Zealand.

In 1987, a decision was made by Fletcher Challenge to consolidate the two corporate headquarters into a single office in Auckland, which led to a decision to merge the two art collections. An art committee was formed in 1990 prior to the merger, which included James Fletcher Jr., John Hood, Michael Andrews, and Neville Darrow (later succeeded by Bill Falconer).

The Fletcher Challenge Art Collection was established on 1 July 1991 after the merger of the two collections, and ownership was transferred to the Fletcher Trust. The trust employed a full-time curator, Peter Shaw, to manage the collection, who continued to grow the collection. Shaw oversaw the commission of a portrait of chief executive Hugh Fletcher by Richard McWhannell in 1996, which commemorated Fletcher's retirement.

In 2001 during the disestablishment of Fletcher Challenge, the collection became a part of the Fletcher Trust, and was renamed the Fletcher Trust Collection. Since becoming independent of Fletcher, new acquisitions to the collection are funded by the trust's investments.

Since 2002, the trust has loaned works to Government House, Auckland and Government House, Wellington, and has loaned works to the Auckland High Court and the Auckland Art Gallery. The Fletcher Trust Collection has staged public exhibitions of their artworks, including a 2002 exhibition curated by Shaw at the Sarjeant Gallery, Whanganui, the touring exhibitionTe Huringa / Turning Points (2008/2009),

Tirohanga Whānui; Views of the Past at the Waitangi Museum in 2017, From the Fletcher Collection (2015) at the Opus Gallery of the Whakatāne Museum, Gathered Voices: Highlights from The Fletcher Trust Collection (2023) at the Suter Art Gallery in Nelson, and an exhibition held at the Eastern Southland Gallery in 2024. Many of the artworks are displayed at the Fletcher company headquarters. In 2010, Peter Shaw staged an exhibition called A Centennial Exhibition: Treasures from The Fletcher Trust Collection in the underpass that connects the Fletcher Building headquarters to 810 Great South Road, which was only accessible to staff.

In 2014, the Fletcher Trust sold more than 70 works from the collection.

Shaw stood down from the position of curator in 2019, after which Francis McWhannell took up the position.

=== Artists within the collection ===
By 2020, the collection included nearly 600 works by over 250 artists, primarily focused on artists working within the New Zealand art scene, or historic artworks. This includes works by Colin McCahon, Gordon Walters, Lois White, Robyn Kahukiwa, Michael Smither, John Hoyte, Don Binney, Dick Frizzell, John Tole and Peter Siddell. In 1979, James Fletcher and George Fraser purchased the 'Duperrey prints', a series of lithographs which record the voyage of the Astrolabe to New Zealand in 1824 (sketched by Jules Louis Lejeune, painted by Antoine Chazal, and engraved by Ambroise Tardieu). In September 1994, the trust purchased Minor (triptych) by Luise Fong, and in October 2013, the Trust purchased Dusky Bay (1773) by William Hodges, thought to be the earliest known oil painting made in New Zealand of a New Zealand subject.

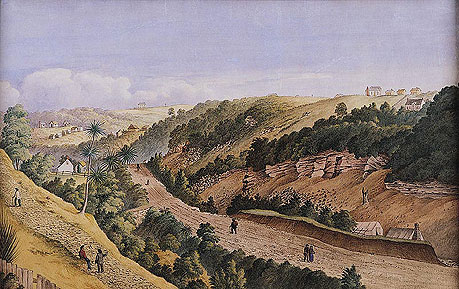
The Quarries, Dunedin, Upper Maclaggan Street (Taken from My Lodgings, Clifton Villa) (1862) by Richard Seymour Kelly

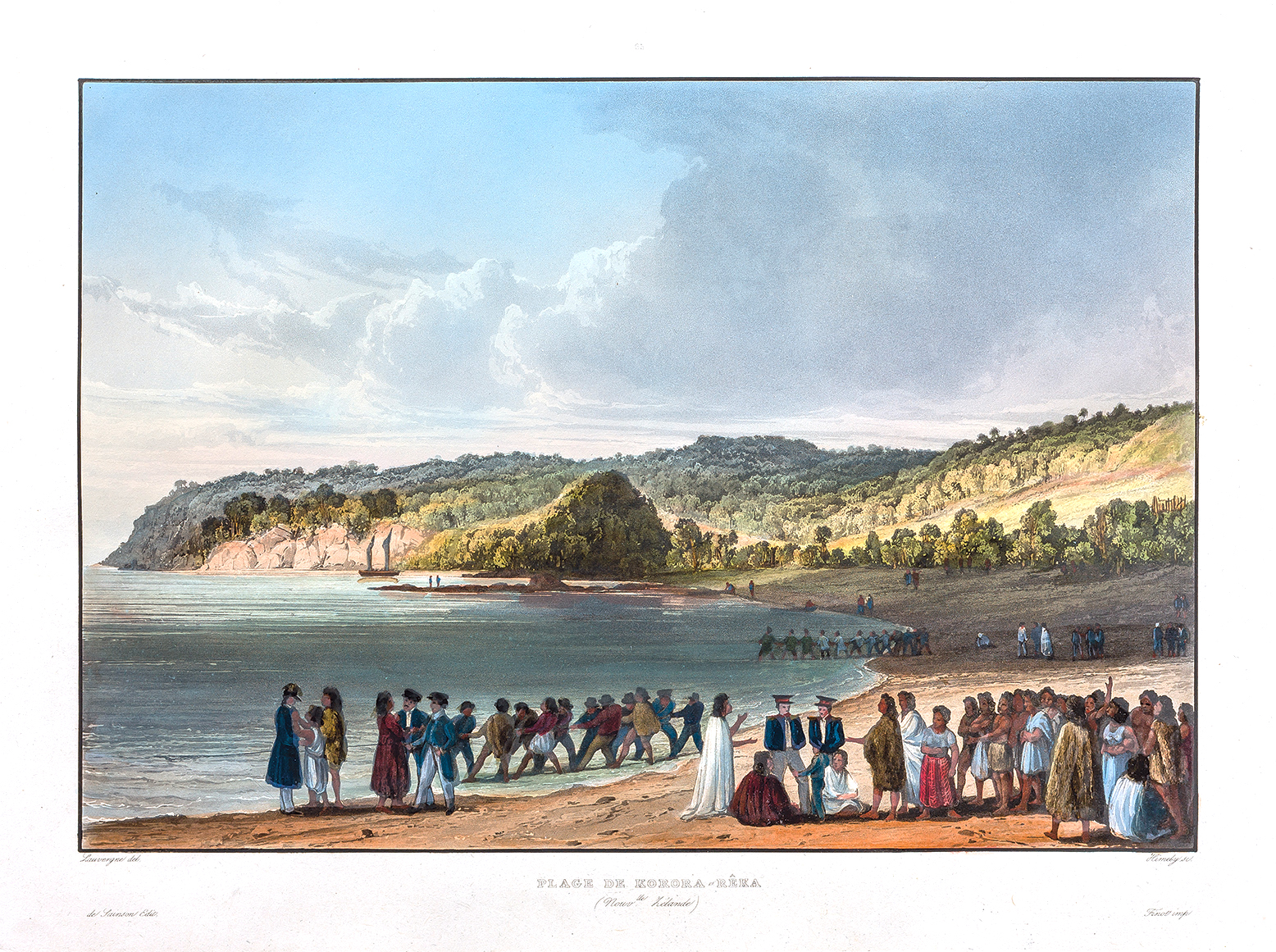
Plage de Korora-Rêka (Nouv’lle Zélande) (1835) by Barthélemy Lauvergne

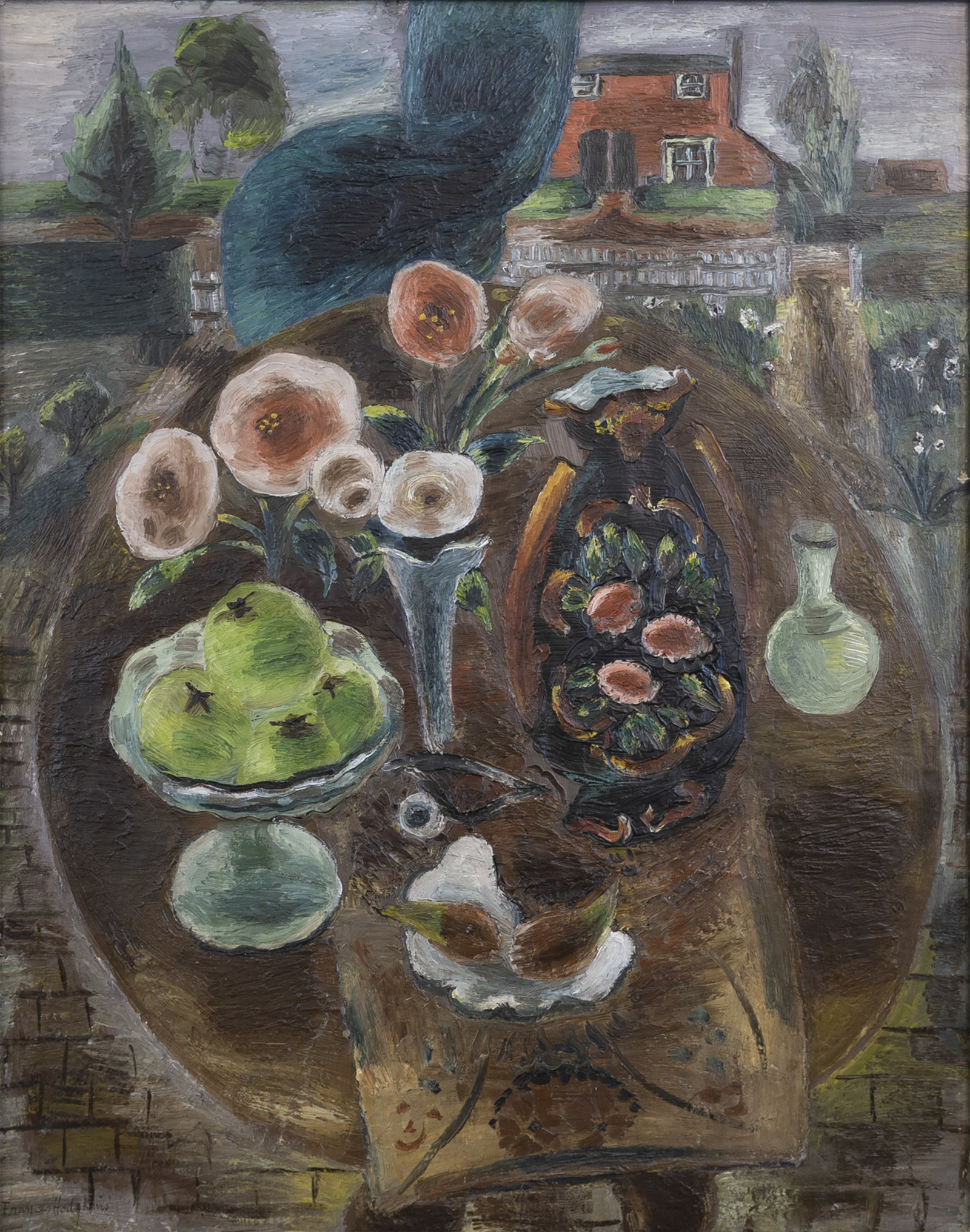
Still Life (1929) by Frances Hodgkins

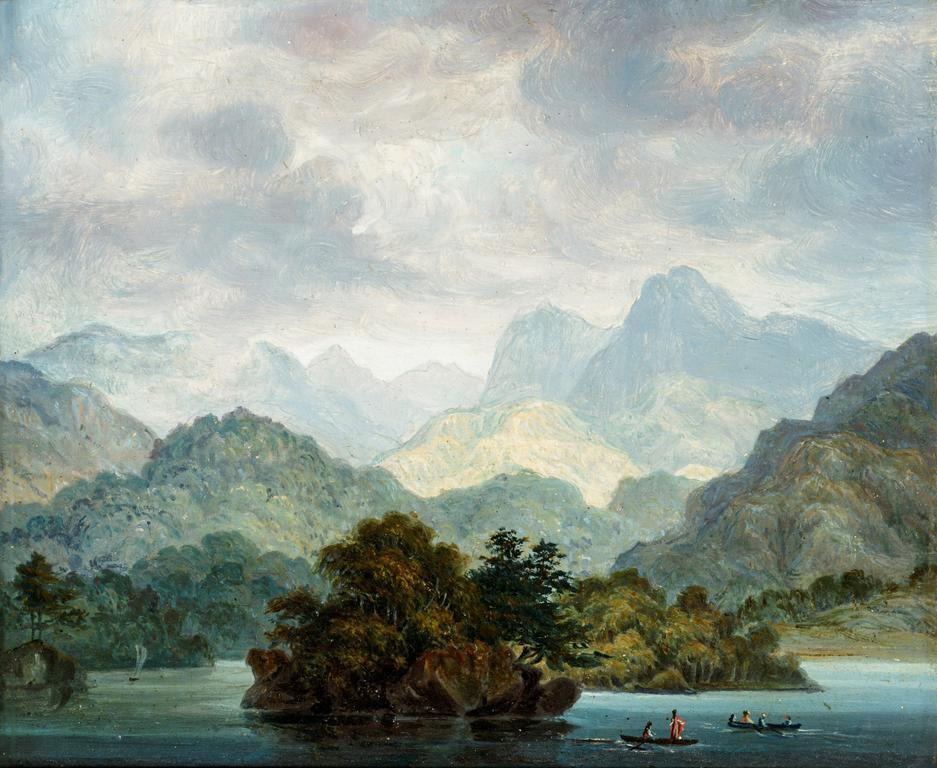
Dusky Sound (1773) by William Hodges
