= Bill Hammond =

New Zealand artist (1947–2021)

- Born: William David Hammond; 29 August 1947; Christchurch, New Zealand
- Died: 30 January 2021 (aged 73); Christchurch, New Zealand
- Education: Ilam School of Fine Arts
- Alma mater: University of Canterbury
- Known for: painting
- Awards: 1994 Premier Award winner, Visa Gold Art Awards (co-winners with Luise Fong)

William Hammond (29 August 1947 – 30 January 2021) was a New Zealand artist who was part of the post-colonial Gothic movement at the end of the 1990s. He lived and worked in Lyttelton. The theme of his works centred around the environment and social justice.

== Early life ==
Hammond was born in Christchurch on 29 August 1947. He attended Burnside High School. He went on to study at the Ilam School of Fine Arts of the University of Canterbury from 1966 until 1969. Before embarking on his career in art, he worked in a sign factory, made wooden toys, and was a jewellery designer. He also had a keen interest in music, serving as the percussionist for a jug band called The Band of Hope.

== Career ==
Hammond started to exhibit his works in 1980, and went back to painting on a full-time basis one year later. His first solo exhibition was at the Brooke Gifford Gallery in Christchurch in 1982. In March 1987 he showed for the first time at the Peter McLeavey Gallery in Wellington, an exhibition followed by over 20 others.

One of Hammond's best known work was the painting Waiting for Buller (1993). This was in reference to Walter Lawry Buller, the first New Zealander ornithologist who wrote A History of New Zealand Bird s in 1873. Hammond was particularly interested in the contradictions in Buller's life, in how he documented birds while being a hunter and taxidermist. Another noted piece of his was Fall of Icarus (1995), which explores the effects of the colonisation on the country, and is exhibited at Christchurch Art Gallery. The Guardian described this as "his most famous work". His painting Bone Yard, Open Home (2009) was the largest single piece of canvas he painted, with a width of more than four metres.

In 1994, Hammond was the joint Premier Award winners with Luise Fong for the Visa Gold Art Award, the largest art prize in New Zealand at the time.

== Themes ==
The overarching theme of Hammond's work was social and environmental issues. Specifically, it touched on the imperiled state of both, as well as the destruction brought on by colonisation. His paintings feature two common themes: references to popular music and gaunt creatures with avian heads and human limbs. The characters in Hammond's paintings, which were often anthropomorphic animals, rarely move away from their natural habitat and are in no hurry. Humans are notably absent from his works during the later part of his career, which was influenced by his visit to the Auckland Islands in 1989. Two signature colours employed by Hammond were emerald green and gold. He was also at the forefront of the Post-colonial Gothic movement. This ultimately became "one of the most influential tendencies in New Zealand painting" at the turn of the 3rd millennium.

== Later life ==
Hammond eschewed giving interviews and guarded his privacy. He died in Christchurch on the evening of 30 January 2021, at the age of 73. He was labelled as one of the country's "most influential contemporary painters" by Radio New Zealand.

== Collections ==
- Chartwell Collection at the Auckland Art Gallery
- Christchurch Art Gallery
- Fletcher Trust Collection
- Museum of New Zealand
- Sarjeant Gallery
- University of Auckland Art Collection
- Victoria and Albert Museum, London.
