= John Hoyte =

New Zealand painter and educator (1835–1913)

John Barr Clark Hoyte (22 December 1835 – 21 February 1913) was a New Zealand painter and educator.

== Biography ==
Hoyte was born on 22 December 1835, in London. In 1860, he and his wife left Britain for New Zealand where they were to live for 16 years. Three daughters were born in Auckland and it is possible they also had a son. He moved to Sydney in 1879, and died there on 21 February 1913, aged 77.

== Gallery of his works ==
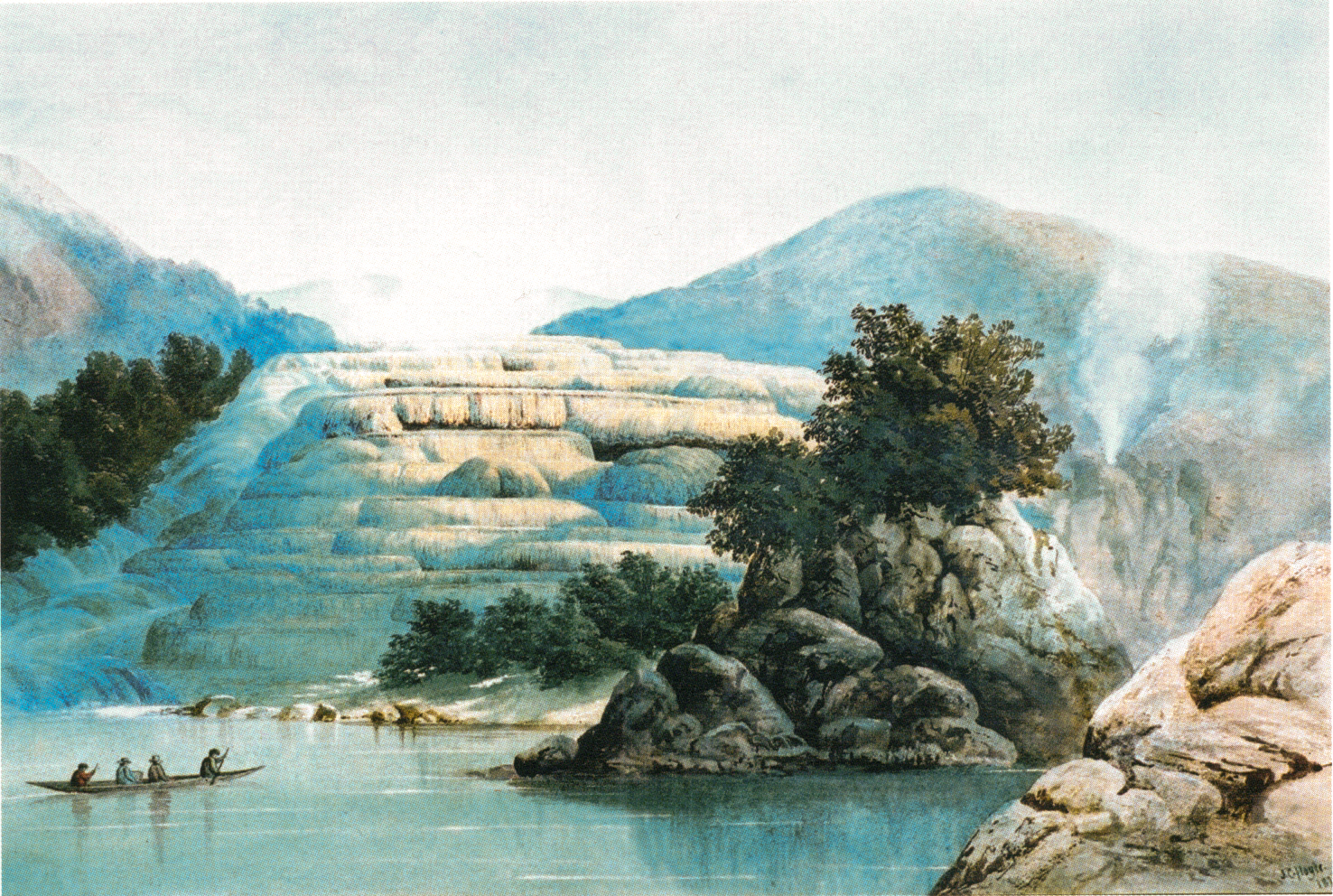
Pink Terrace

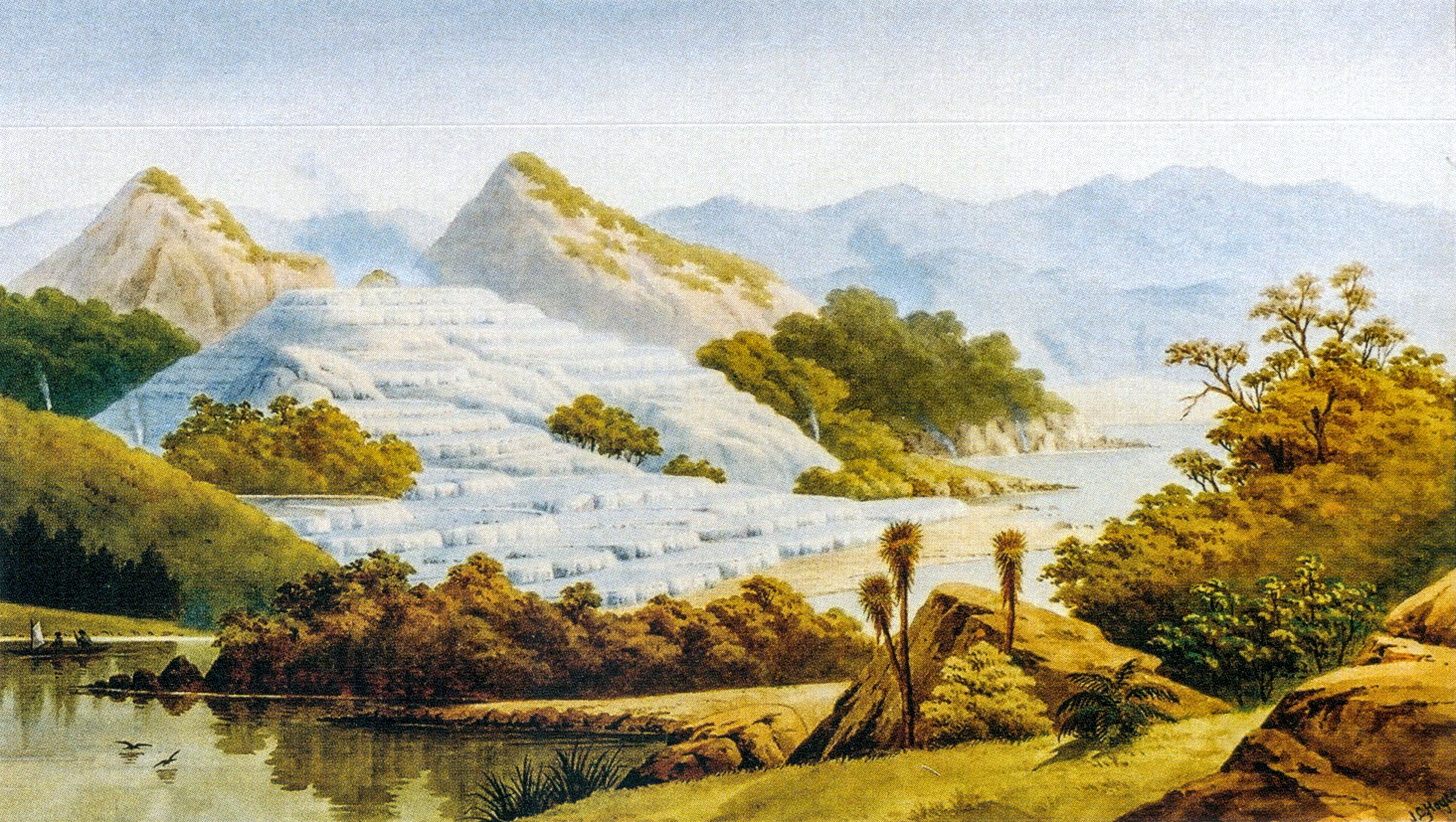
White Terraces

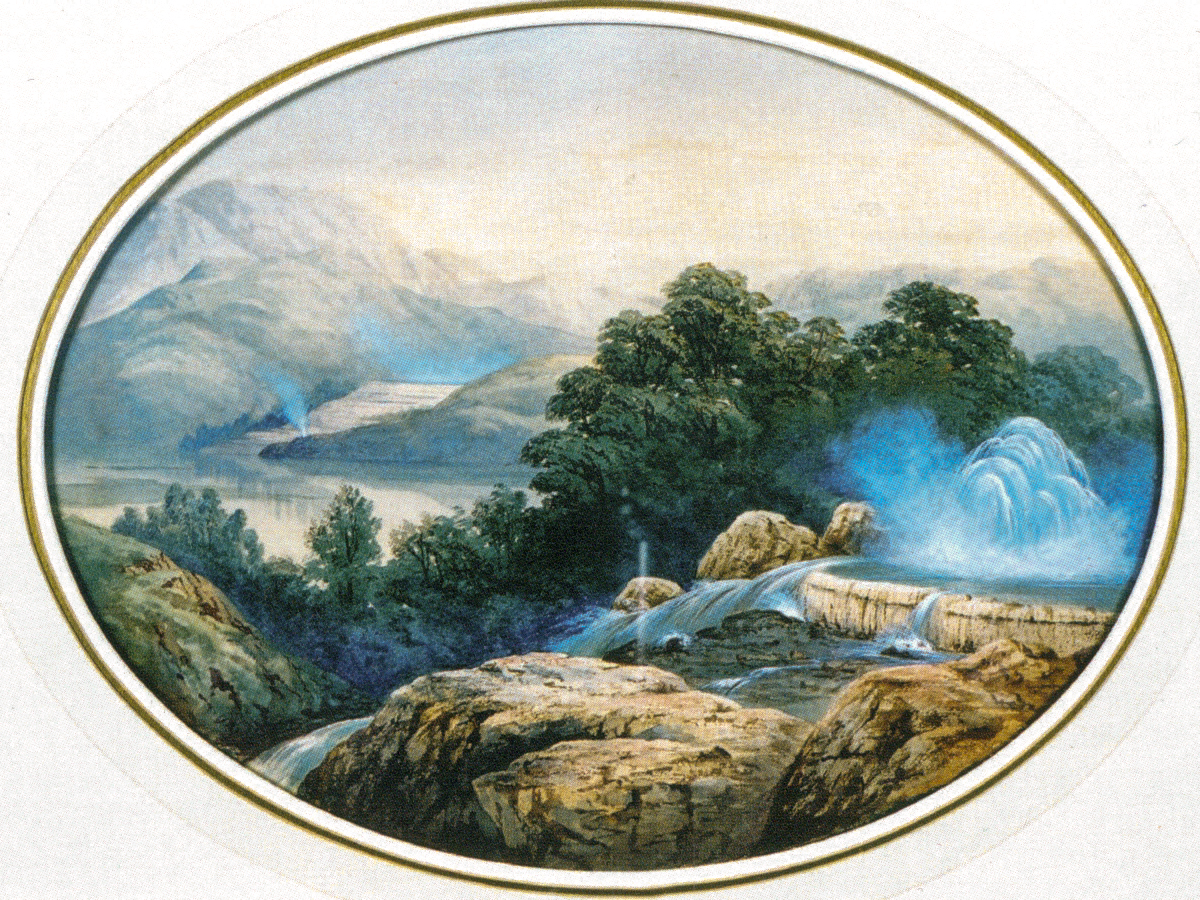
Koingo Geyser

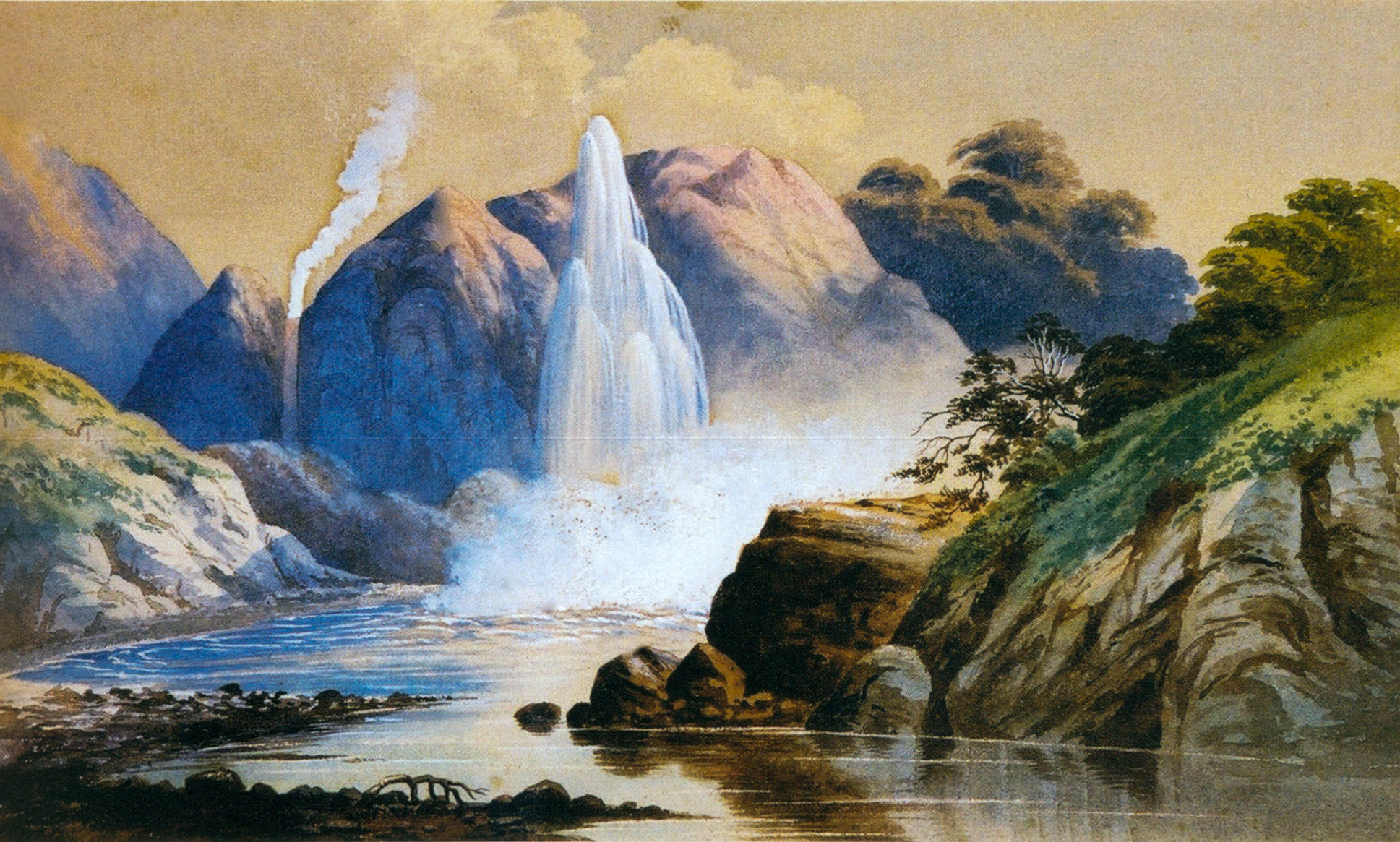
Whakamanu Geyser
