= Visa Gold Art Award =

- Description: Contemporary art prize in New Zealand
- Country: New Zealand

The Visa Gold Art Award was a contemportary art prize in New Zealand from 1991 to 1998.

== Winners ==
Recipients of the Visa Gold Art Award included some of New Zealand's most notable artists. In 1994, Luise Fong and Bill Hammond were announced as joint winners. Luise Fong won with her work Minor. Minor was later exhibited in the exhibition Cultural Safety: Contemporary Art from New Zealand, at Frankfurter Kunstverein in Germany (1995) and City Gallery Wellington in New Zealand (1995-1996). In 1995, Tony de Lautour took home the top prize. Fiona Pardington was the winner of the competition in 1997. Fiona Pardington previously won the Visa Gold Art Award in 1991 for her artwork Soft Target. The work resembles an reliquary, and features a photograph surrounded by a wooden frame covered in contradictory religious messages.

== Controversy ==
When Susan Jowsey won in 1996 with an exhibit based on soiled clothing, people criticised her for having dirty laundry in a public space.
