= Saskia Leek =

New Zealand painter (born 1970)

- Born: 1970 (age 55–56); Christchurch, New Zealand
- Education: University of Canterbury School Of Fine Arts
- Known for: Painting

Saskia Leek (born 1970) is a New Zealand painter.

== Life and career ==
Leek has been known to use already existing prints and op-shop images as a starting point for some of her works. Her subject matter has included house pets, sunsets and sunrises, homes and cottages, chimneys and horses. Leek's focus has shifted from representation to Cubism and into Abstraction and thus has reflected the path of 20th century art.

Leek was born in 1970 in Christchurch. As of 2022 she lives in Dunedin. She graduated from the Canterbury School of Fine Arts. Leek finished her MFA at the Elam School of Fine Art in 2016 in Auckland.

In 1997 she won the Olivia Spencer Bower Award. In 2009, Leek was nominated for the Auckland Art Gallery's Walters Prize for her series Yellow is the Putty of the World. In 2012 Nick Austin, Leek's partner, was awarded the Frances Hodgkins Fellowship. This resulted in the couple moving from Auckland to Dunedin for a year and staying on afterwards.

In 2022 Bordering on the Miraculous was published, a collaboration between Leek and the poet Lynley Edmeades.

== Exhibitions ==
2009 VARIOUS NIGHTS IN HEAVY LIGHT, Darren Knight Gallery, Sydney, Australia.

2008 Thick Air Method, Jack Hanley Gallery, San Francisco, USA.

2008 Better Places, Perth Institute of Contemporary Art, Perth, Australia.

2007 Tunnels, nets and holes, Darren Knight Gallery, Sydney, Australia.

2006 - 2007 The Ian Potter Museum of Art, the University of Melbourne, Melbourne, Australia.

== Public Collections ==
Leek's work is held in the following public collections:

- Museum of New Zealand - Te Papa Tongarewa, Wellington
- Auckland City Art Gallery
- Govett-Brewster Art Gallery, New Plymouth
- Dunedin Public Art Gallery, Dunedin
