= Toi Tū Toi Ora: Contemporary Māori Art =

Contemporary Māori art exhibition in Auckland, New Zealand

- Exhibition poster for Toi Tū Toi Ora: Contemporary Māori Art
- Date: 5 December 2020 – 9 May 2021
- Venue: Auckland Art Gallery Toi o Tāmaki
- Location: Auckland
- Theme: Contemporary Māori art

Toi Tū Toi Ora: Contemporary Māori Art was a survey exhibition at the Auckland Art Gallery Toi o Tāmaki in New Zealand. The exhibition took place from Saturday 5 December 2020 to Sunday 9 May 2021 and utilised all the exhibitions spaces of the Auckland Art Gallery Toi o Tāmaki.

== The curator ==
Toi Tū Toi Ora was curated by Nigel Borell (Pirirākau, Ngāi Te Rangi, Ngāti Ranginui, Te Whakatōhea). A practising artist, he had been associate curator Māori Art at Auckland War Memorial Museum before being appointed Māori curator at the Auckland Art Gallery Toi o Tāmaki in 2015. Borell was the second curator of Māori Art at the gallery following Ngahiraka Mason. Reflecting on the exhibition later, Borell commented ‘It’s an exhibition that I pitched when I interviewed for the job back in 2015…because it had been 15 years or so since the last survey show of contemporary Māori art, it was really important that we checked in with contemporary Māori art as a movement and put a spotlight on those artists who have come around since.

== The exhibition ==
The exhibition displayed art spanning from the 1950s onwards. Toi Tū Toi Ora: Contemporary Māori Art compiled over 300 artworks from 111 Māori artists, some of whom are New Zealand's most significant artists and explores 70 years of Māori art through the framework of the Māori creation story. With artworks spanning a multitude of artistic outcomes including sculpture, painting, film, ceramics, weaving, jewellery and digital art. Informed by Te Ao Māori (Māori worldview), the exhibition was split into concepts to mirror the Māori creation narrative. Initially Toi Tū Toi Ora was planned as a smaller project but the Covid pandemic resulted in two international exhibitions being postponed and the remainder of the gallery became available to Borell. The exhibition was displayed over three floors. The ground floor introduced the exhibition presenting themes based on cosmology and the Māori creation story. As critic John Hurrell noted, ‘Its organising structure is deliberately counter to traditional Eurocentric art historical paradigms, being focussed on Māori social and philosophical themes, not conventional production chronology.

== Concept ==
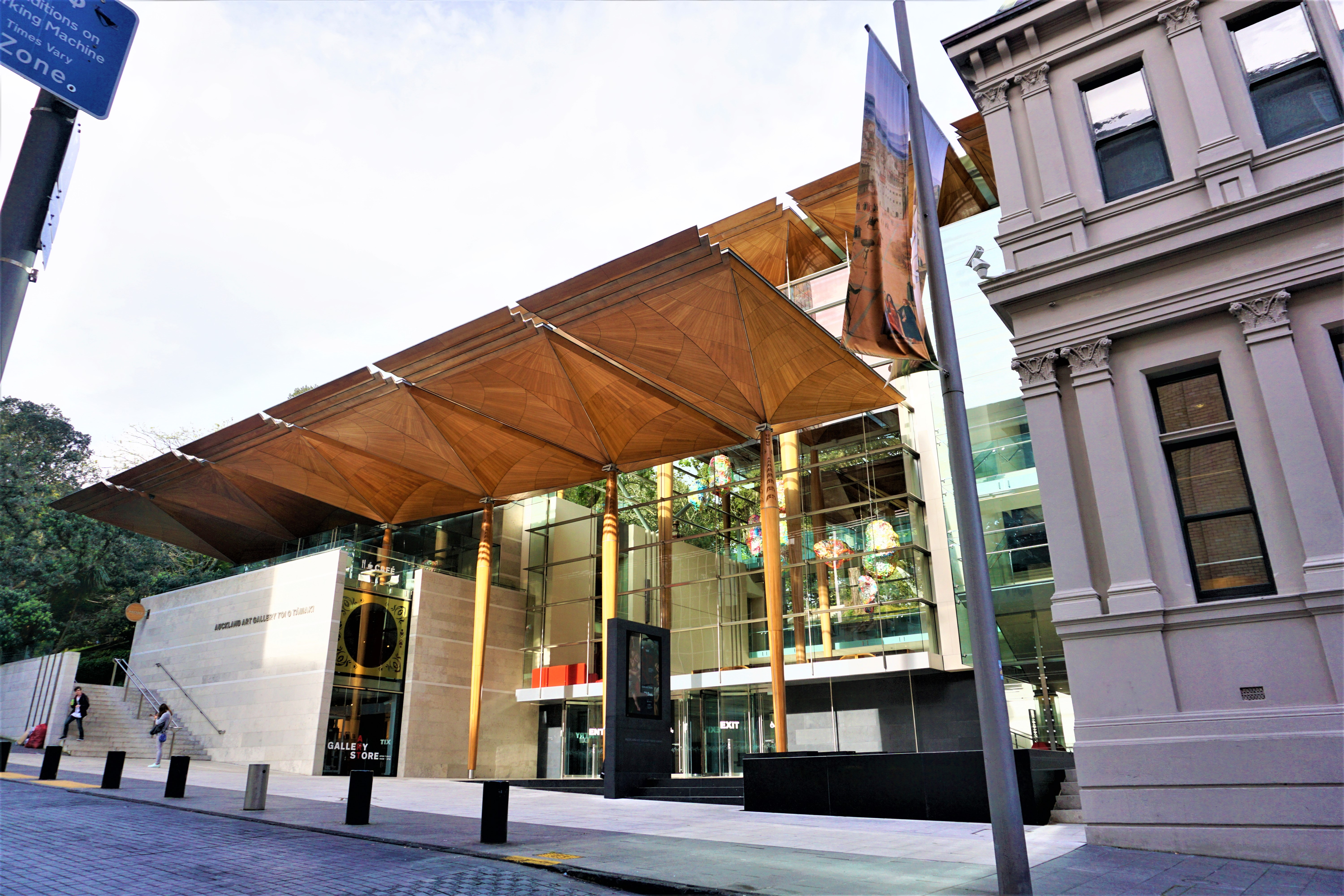
The Auckland Art Gallery Toi o Tāmaki

The exhibition explores 70 years of Māori art through the framework of the Māori creation story. With artworks spanning a multitude of artistic outcomes including sculpture, painting, film, ceramics, weaving, jewelry and digital art. Informed by Te Ao Māori (Māori worldview), the exhibition was split into concepts to mirror the Māori creation narrative.

The dimly lit opening room of the exhibition represented Te Kore (The Great Nothingness) and contained artworks such as Whenua Kore (2019), by Robert Jahnke, Black Painting: Orange/Blue/Indigo (1969) by Ralph Hotere and Universe (2001) by Peter Robinson. The next room represented Te Po (The Perpetual Night) with works such as Wai o te Marama (2004) by Maureen Lander, Ara-i-te-uru (2011) Israel Tangaroa Birch and Konae Korero #2 (2008) by Darryn George. Following the narrative, the next room transitioned to the story of Te Wehenga o Rānginui raua ko Papatūānuku (The Separation of Rānginui and Papatūānuku) which is represented through works such as Lisa Reihana's video installation, Ihi (2020) and Fiona Pardington's Davis Kea Wings (2015).

Moving to Te Ao Marama (The World of Light and Life) the gallery's display works such as Robyn Kahukiwa's Hinetitama (1980) and Saffronn Te Ratana, Hemi Macgregor and Ngataihuru Taepa's group work, Tu te manu ora i te Rangi (2008). The next room represented Te Poropiti me te Whakapātari (Prophecy and Provocation) with artworks such as Peter Robinson's Strategic Plan, (1998) and Rachel Rakena's video work Rerehiko, (2003). Curator Megan Tamati-Quennel noted in Art New Zealand, ‘Although the artworks in Toi Tū Toi Ora are structured to fit into the overarching narrative of the Māori creation story, the artists and work do not labour under this framing; there is still autonomy and space for the individual artworks and artists to stand out clearly and the inherent meanings of their works are not compromised or lost.’

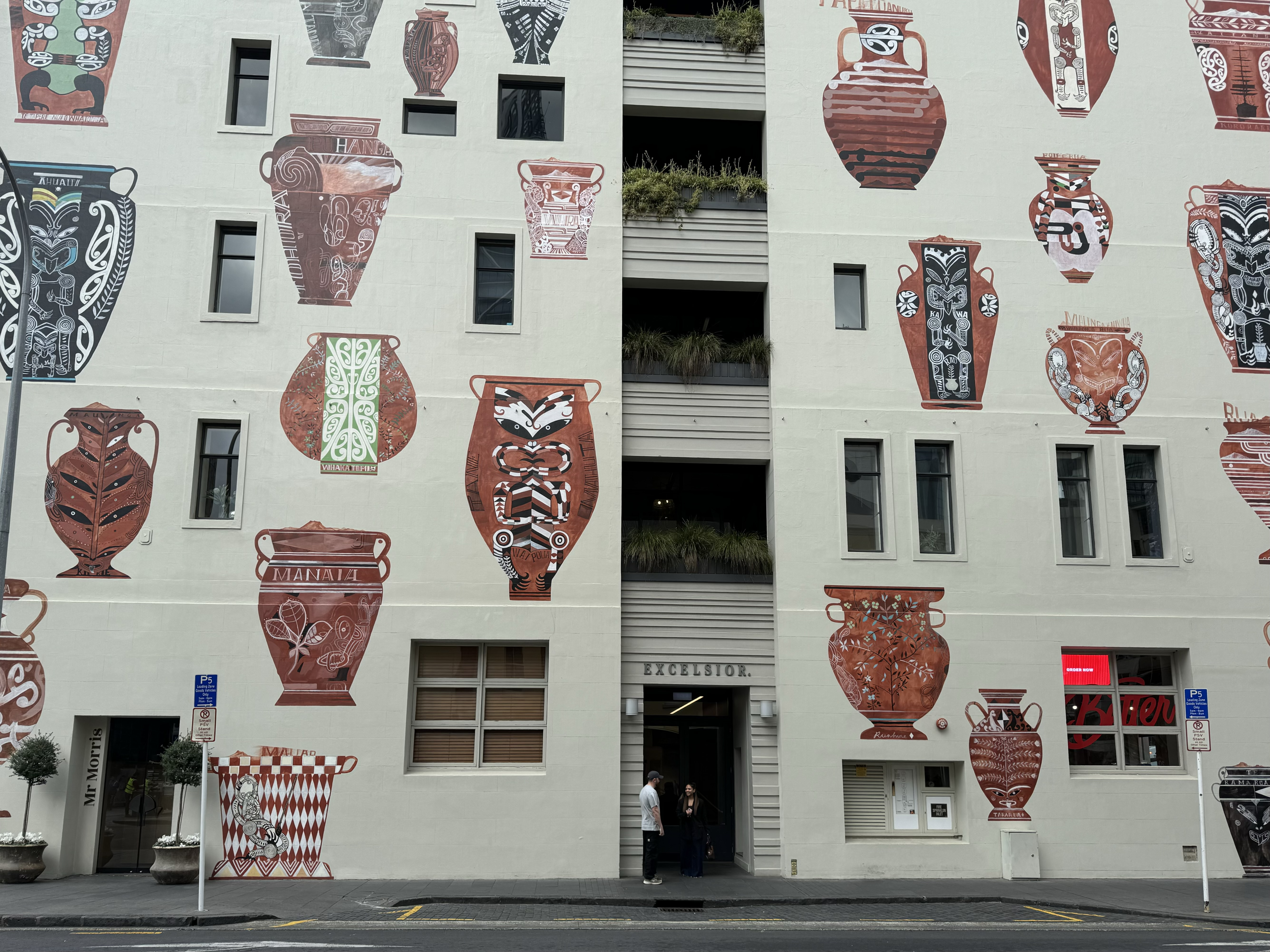
Shane Cotton's mural Maunga painted on the side of the Excelsior House at Britomart as part of Tu Toi Tu Ora

The exhibition expanded outside the gallery with installations in Britomart in Auckland's CBD. These included the digital installation, SCOUT: Wawata Hōhonu (2020) by Lyonel Grant and Tim Gruchy. The installation work, Te Hau Whakaroa (2020) by Charlotte Graham and a large scale permanent mural by Shane Cotton entitled Maunga. It is located on the side of the Excelsior House near the back of the Britomart Transport Centre. Cotton’s mural is of 25 large scale pots all decorated with Māori symbology and subject matter many of them with featuring mountains the English word for the mural’s title. The forms as with many of Cotton’s paintings reflect on the Māori adoption of some European styles and motifs in the early Colonial period. For Cotton all the images depicted on the large pots also have deep personal meanings and references. In speaking to Kim Meridith of The Art Paper he pointed out one pot that includes the words Fa’a Samoa, a direct reference to friends the artist has in Auckland.

== Reception ==
Toi Tū Toi Ora: Contemporary Māori Art was a landmark exhibition and the largest exhibition of Māori art since, Te Māori (1984–1987), which toured The United States of America and Aotearoa New Zealand. Auckland Art Gallery Toi o Tāmaki's last survey offering of Māori art was, Pūrangiaho: Seeing Clearly, curated by Ngahiraka Mason in 2001. Discourse surrounding the exhibition suggested the overdue nature of an exhibition of this kind and celebrated the breadth of work and curatorial approach. Art critic John Daly-Peoples wrote, ‘This exhibition shows the depth of Māori art and the ways in which it addresses cultural, social, political and personal ideas. It also demonstrates that there is a distinct Māori voice which looks at the present day issues always with an eye on the past. And in E Tangata Kennedy Warner described Toi Tū Toi Ora as, ’…like being invited to a wānanga on Māori worldview. From the Gallery’s point of view the exhibition was the largest in its 132 year history and the most well attended since Te Māori. In all there were 140,000 visitors. Of these 6,000 were students (twice the normal rate) and 51 percent were new to the Gallery. Of special note Māori visitation to Auckland Art Gallery Toi o Tāmaki increased from 4 per cent to 15 per cent during the Toi Tū Toi Ora exhibition. In recognition of his work on the exhibition Borell was given a Moment in Time Award He Momo by the New Zealand Arts Foundation. The selection panel said of the exhibition, 'When we think about moments that have truly moved the needle on Aotearoa's arts landscape – Toi Tū Toi Ora was one of them. It has redefined the story we tell about the arts in this country,'

== Controversy ==
Shortly after the opening of Toi Tū Toi Ora Borrell resigned from his role at Auckland Art Gallery Toi o Tāmaki, making it clear that he was leaving on his own volition owing to ‘irreconcilable differences’ with the Gallery’s director Kirsten Lacy. Borrell explained his position to local reporters pointing out that it was critical that the leading voice in any Māori exhibition was Māori. As Borell noted, ‘This is our heritage and our cultural knowledge and if we can't lead it, who can?’ He explained that sharing power with the director had proved very difficult creating issues around allowing Māori artists having authority and giving Borell the ability to lead in the decision-making process. Borell saw this tension as the result of power in the Gallery being, ‘constructed to support colonial ideals and institutions, and not necessarily the diversity of people in Aotearoa.’ At the opening of the exhibition people were seen wearing badges with the letters NB and the words ‘not today coloniser’ in support of Borell. In response Lacy pointed out that the gallery actively works, 'to make visible te reo Māori within the gallery, we have bilingual wayfinding, all materials for Toi Tū Toi Ora are bilingual, and we support staff with te reo classes for front of house and leadership teams.' Borell's departure resulted in half of the Māori Advisory Group Haerewa, who had been closely involved in the exhibition resigning stating, ‘changes over the past two years at Auckland Art Gallery Toi o Tāmaki have set a different vision for Māori.’ Eleven staff members also resigned. (Leonie Hayden ‘Unsafe space for Māori’: Auckland Art Gallery in turmoil as staff question leadership Shortly after Borell’s departure Tom Irvine of Ngāti Whātua Ōrākei was appointed to the position of Deputy Director.

== Publication ==
The publication, Toi Tū Toi Ora: Contemporary Māori Art, was edited by Nigel Borell, designed by Tyrone Ohia and the layout by Katrina Duncan.

The publication won multiple awards, including Gold at the Best Design Awards 2022 (Designer's Institute of New Zealand) for 'Editorial and Books' along with Gold in the 'Toitanga' Maori design category. In 2023 it won The Art Association of Australia and New Zealand (AAANZ) Arts Writing and Publishing Award 'Best Large Exhibition Catalogue'. The book also received the supreme award at The Publishers Association of New Zealand Te Rau o Tākupu (PANZ) Book Design Awards in 2023.

== Documentary film ==
At the 2025 International Film Festival producer and director Chelsea Winstanley premiered her documentary TOITŪ: Visual Sovereignty in Auckland. The film is a fly-on-the-wall view of the making of Toi Tū Toi Ora and followed Borell as he curated the exhibition. The Festival promoted the documentary as ‘an unprecedented insight into the curation of the Toi Tū Toi Ora: Contemporary Māori Art exhibition that reveals the struggle for Māori artistic sovereignty within the structures of Aotearoa New Zealand’s cultural institutions.’ Clips from online discussions between the Gallery Director and the Māori Advisory Group, Haerewa clearly revealed ‘the constraints between institutional authority and Māori self-determination.’ The film also presented a number of the exhibiting artists and a thorough overview of the exhibition itself in its final form. Film critic Graeme Tuckett called the documentary, ‘an intelligently and sensitively made film. The ideas and issues that it raises and examines are essential ones, and TOITŪ: Visual Sovereignty is a thoughtful, and extraordinarily beautiful, addition to the conversation.’ In 2026 TOITŪ: Visual Sovereignty was selected for the Santa Barbara International Film Festival.

== Artists & Artworks ==
The following is a list of all artists and artworks included in Toi Tū Toi Ora: Contemporary Māori Art:

Artist	Artworks
Sandy Adsett (b.1939)	Puhoro, 2020 Riri, 1977 Nikau, 1981 Waipuna, 1978 Koiri Series, 1981 Keroro (Muritai- Wind from the Sea), 1980–81
Hiria Anderson (b.1975)	Tākaro, 2019 Mōrena, 2017
Reweti Arapere (b. 1984)	Poropiti Wairua, 2020 Poropiti Rongomau, 2020 Poropiti Toi, 2020
Margaret Aull (b.1978)	Otengi Road, 2017 Te Miha me te Himene, 2020
Erna Baker (b.1984)	Tango Whakaahua, 2006
Gabrielle Belz (b.1947)	Page 27 May 29, 1916, 2017
Israel Tangaroa Birch (b.1976)	Aramoana, 2016–17 Tai Timu- Tai Pari, 2020 Ara-i-te-uru, 2011
Buster Black (b.1932 – d.2007)	Black Painting: Night Landscape, 1962
Chris Byrant-Toi (b.1970)	Te Ahi-kāinga-roa, 2005
Tangimoe Clay (b.1960)	Taonga o Te Ariki, 2017
Paerau Corneal (b.1961)	Hinemoa & Hinemoa, 2011
Shane Cotton (b.1964)	Eden to Ohaeawai, 1998–2000 Picture Painting, 1994 Maunga, 2020 Te Puawai, 2020
Natalie Couch (b.1976)	Wairākei, 2018
Davina Duke (b.1975)	Te Ara Waenganui (Current Pathway), 2020
Vanessa Wairata Edwards (b.1980)	Kua rere ki to moenga, to fly to your bed.., 2012 Titiro atu, titiro mai (look there, look here, look inwards, look outwards), 2011 Tupuna, 2018 Hine-Tītama, 2018 Hinenui-Te-Po, 2018
Zena Elliot (b.1975)	Current, 2017 Flow, 2017
Elizabeth Ellis (b.1945)	Te Rawhiti Rakaumangamanga, 1966 Puke Huia, 1966
John Bevan Ford (b.1930 – d.2005)	Maui and Mahuika, 1993
Jacqueline Fraser (b.1956)	Raupatu,1980
Darryn George (b.1970)	Konae Korero #2, 2008
Steve Gibbs (b.1955)	6th Sense, 2017 Turbulence, 2019
Star Gossage (b.1973)	I have sung my way through the world, 2018 Matariki, 2014
Brett Graham (b.1967)	Te Uru, 2014 Rāwhiti, 2014 Talcahuano, 2012 Saanapu, 2012 Te Hokioi, 2008 Foreshore Defender, 2008 Spirit of Aloha, 2008
Charlotte Graham (b.1972)	Te Ha o Te wao Nui a Tāne/ The Breath of Tāne, 2020 Mauri Ora, 2012 Kotahi hā kotahi te oranga, 2015 Ete tau, tahuri mai, 2012 Utua te kino ki te pai, 2012 Kauri Ora, 2012 Te Hau Whakaora, 2020
Fred Graham (b.1928)	Te Wehenga o Rangi raua ko Papa, 1988 Te Ika a Maui, 1970
Lyonel Grant (b.1957)	Te Ure o Te Ngarie, 1991 SCOUT: Wawata Hōhonu, 2020
Ayesha Green (b.1987)	Mum (May 1985), 2020 Mei, 2016
Tim Gruchy (b.1957)	SCOUT: Wawata Hōhonu, 2020
Ngahuia Harrison (b.1988)	Coastal Cannibals, 2020
Chris Heaphy (b.1965)	Walk This Way, 1997
Ngaahina Hohaia (b.1975)	Paopao ki tua o rangi, 2009
Rangituhia Hollis (b.1973)	Kei Mate Mangopare, 2011
Ralph Hotere (b.1931 – d.2013)	Black Painting: Orange/Blue/Indigo, 1969 Black Painting: Purple/Yellow/Indigo, 1969 Black Painting: Blue/Orange/Indigo, 1969 Black Painting: Green, Red, Indigo, 1969 Black Painting: Yellow/Violet Indigo, 1969 Black Painting: Red/Green/Indigo, 1969 Rangi Is My Ancestor, 1972
John Hovell (b.1937 – d.2014)	Te ata toitoi XII, 1985–86 Te ata tuatua, 1985–86 Te ata atata- cat's eye bubu, 1985
Lonnie Hutchinson (b.1963)	Aroha ki te Ora, 2020 Milk and Honey, 2012
Ana Iti (b.1989)	Takoto, 2020
Robert Jahnke (b.1951)	Whenua Kore, 2019 Ripeka Kowhai, 2015 Ripeka Kahurangi, 2015 Ripeka, Whero, 2015 Waitangi Rosary, 2007
Robyn Kahukiwa (b.1938)	Hinetītama, 1980 Taranga, 1982 The Outcast, 1980 Girl in Bush Shirt, 1982 Ngā Tipuna Kei Mua Ko Tatou Kei Muri, 1996
Leilani Kake (b.1977)	Ariki, 2007
Eugene Kara (b.1973)	In the wool shed..., 2004
Emily Karaka (b.1952)	Te Uri o Te Ao, 1995 CULTURAL ID; Marae, Maunga, Motu, 2020 Coming Through, 1983
Natasha Te Arahori Keating (b.1972)	Hine Marama 2, 2018
Rangi Kipa (b.1966)	Hakawai (Karanga Manu- Bird Caller), 2015 Untitled, 2019
Te Rongo Kirkwood (b.1973)	Eunoia, 2020
Jimmy James Kouratoras (b.1972)	Pou Rongoā o te Rā, 2017
Lily Laita (b.1969)	Pari'aka, 1989
Maureen Lander (b.1942)	Wai o te Marama, 2004 Crown Grab Bag, 2006
Matekino Lawless (b.1928)	Beyond the Wharenui, 2020
Randal Leach (b.1973)	Rua i te Wānanga, 2019
Jeremy Leatinu'u (b.1984)	Queen Victoria, 2013
Janet Lilo (b.1982)	Right of Way, 2013
Mere Harrison Lodge (b.1944)	Mata Whenua, 1963 Te Toka-a-Tōrea, 1963
Dan Mace (b.1976)	Kahumaku: A cloak of Tears, 2017
Hemi Macgregor (b.1975)	Tu te manu ora i te Rangi, 2008 Agent Provocateur #2, 2012
Toi Te Rito Maihi (b.1937)	Tāniko, date unknown Uenuku, 1986 Rimurapa I, 2018 Rimurapa II, 2018 Surprise, 1979
Mata Aho Collective: Erna Baker, Sarah Hudson, Bridget Reweti, Terri Te Tau	Atapō, 2020
Bethany Matai Edmunds (b.1978)	Hine Marama 2, 2018
Kāterina Mataria (b.1932 – d.2011)	Lonely Crowd, 1973 Untitled, 1973 Moko 1, 1977 Kauwae, S Dome 1, 1977
Gina Matchitt (b.1966)	Pall Mall Cross, 1999 Jesus Nike, 1999 Kaokao I & II, 2016
Paratene (Para) Matchitt (b.1933 – d.2021)	Untitled, 1969
Matthew McIntyre-Wilson (b.1973)	Poi Kura, 2020 Muka Face Mask, 2020
John Miller (b.1950)	Morning karakia, Te Kaha-nui-a-tiki marae, Te Kaha Sunday 3rd June, 1973, 2001 Porch, Tukaki wharenui. Te Kaha. Local kuia and Ringatu Pou Paroa Delamere with Haare Tahapehi. June 1973, 2001 Tukaki wharenui, Te Kaha. Kura Rewiri-Thorsen/Rewiri, Ngahuia Volkering/Te Awekotuku, Anne Iti and Tame iti. June 1973, 2001 Artist's exhibition Te Kaha-nui-a-tiki District High School, Te Kaha. Work by Para Matchitt. June 1973, 2001
Heperi Mita (b.1986)	Hīkoi, 1984–2020
Merata Mita (b.1942 – d.2010)	Hīkoi, 1984–2020
Neke Moa (b.1971)	Ki a wai?, 2019 Mauri Stones, 2016
Linda Munn (b.1960)	Reconstituting the constitution, tea anyone?, 2012
Claudine Muru (b.1970)	Ko Ngā Hua o Rongomaraeroa, 2003
Selwyn Muru (b.1940)	Te Whiti and Tohu over Taranaki, 1975–77 Resurrection of Te Whiti over Taranaki, 1975–77 Ko Nga Hua o Rongomaraeroa, 2003
Manos Nathan (b.1948 – d.2015)	Ipu Manaia Parirau, 2004
Buck Nin (b.1942 – d.1996)	White Island, 1986 This Land Is Ours, 1978 Untitled, 1976
James Ormsby (b.1957)	Tawhiao Cartoon (large Drawing #22), 2008 Tawhiao en rouge, LD #27, 2019
Rona Ngahuia Osborne (b.1974)	Kahumaku: A cloak of Tears, 2017
Fiona Pardington (b.1961)	Davis Kea Wings, 2015
Michael Parekōwhai (b.1968)	Poorman, Beggarman, Thief (Poorman), 1996 The Ascension, 2020 Te Ao Hurihuri (Left), 2009 Te Ao Hurihuri (Right), 2009
Reuben Paterson (b.1973)	Universe, 2001 I Am I, I Am Not I, 2001 Te Pātahitangi ō Rehua, 2005 He hue/Gourds: Kua tu te puehu, 2020 The Kaiahuwhenua and His Three Sons, 2001
Nova Paul (b.1973)	This is not Dying, 2010
Matt Pine (b.1941 – d.2021)	Stack, 1988
Nathan Pohio (b.1970)	The Feral Horses of Natacha von Braun: two files for two monitors, 2016
Rachael Rakena (b.1969)	Rerehiko, 2003
Shona Rapira-Davis (b.1951)	There Are No Bees in My Garden, 2020 Nga Morehu, 1982–88
Aimee Ratana (b.1978)	Crown Pursuit of Te Kooti 1868–1872, 2012 Rua Kenana's Arrest, Maungapohatu 1916, 2012 Tame Iti's Arrest Ruatoki Raids 2007, Labelled by Media as Tuhoe Terrorists. Government Enforced Terrorist Suppression Act, 2012 MMVA_IMG:14, 2005
Lisa Reihana (b.1964)	Ihi, 2020 Mahuika, 2001 Marakihau, 2001 Hinepukohurangi, 2001 Hinewai, 2001
Bridget Reweti (b.1985)	Ziarah, 2018
Baye Riddell (b.1950)	Seven Days, 2012
Natalie Robertson (b.1962)	S23/2.1 Ratana Road 1998 U14/8.4 Kenana Road 1998 U23/4.2 Te Whiti Road 1998 W15/4.4 Te Kooti Road 1998. From the series The Prophets (Ngā Poropiti), 2001 Waipu Bridge Pillar Ki Uta, 2020 Waipu Bridge Pillar Ki Tai, 2020
Peter Robinson (b.1966)	Boy Am I Scared Eh!, 1997 Painting 1993, 1993 Strategic Plan, 1998
Emily Schuster (b.1927– d.1997)	Potae Kiwi, 1990
Maree Sheehan (b.1969)	Te Rita Bernadette Papesch, 2020 Moana Maniapoto, 2020 Ramon Te Wake, 2020
Huhana Smith (b.1962)	Te Rakau a Te Rangitāwhia- The Tree of Te Rangitāwhia, 2003
Kereama Taepa (b.1972)	Pākati Pakemana, 2017 Pākati Karearea, 2017 Pākati Sonic, 2017
Ngataiharuru Taepa (b.1975)	Tu te manu ora i te Rangi, 2008 He ata ki runga, he ata ki raro, 2020 Tane Mahuta- Manos Nathan Legacy, 2015
Wi Te Tau Pirka Taepa (b.1946)	Mahere Mapping Series: Untitled, 2002 Untitled (Punch Patterns), 2002
Tāwera Tahuri (b.1970)	Tamanui Ki Mua!, 2020
Kelcy Taratoa (b.1972)	Kia Aupikinga te Poukapa, 2019 To be as the Seer/Kei tua o Te Arai, 2019
Shannon Te Ao (b.1978)	Two shoots that stretch far out, 2013–14
Jasmine Te Hira (b.1990)	The Beauty of Invisible Grief, 2016
Te Maari (b.1982)	Te Anau, 2019 Te Ahorangi Grace Rangitauninihi Tūī (Emeritus Professor Grace Rangitauninihi Tūī), 2020 Pīpī, Rēri Wharauroa ō Mokopōpaki (Pīpī, Lady Shining Cuckoo of Mokopōpaki), 2020 Mr & Mrs Hēmi and Mereana Pūtangitangi (James and Maryann Paradise-Shelduck), 2020 Te Kereū Maui, 2018 HRH Princess M. Waipurukamu Potaka-Whio, 2020 Te Kōako, 2018 Te Mohua, 2019 Ākipīhopa Renata Kākāpō (Archbishop Renata Kākāpō), 2020 Te Huia, 2018 Te Kōtare, 2019
Saffronn Te Ratana (b.1975)	Tu te manu ora i te Rangi, 2008 3 tlz.lft, 4t.l.z.i.f.t<1, 2001
Kura Te Waru Rewiri (b.1950)	Te Tohu Tuatahi, 1991 Arohanui, 2006 Tenei au, tenei au (This is me, this is me), 2006 Whenua/Wahine /Whenua (Land/Woman/Land), 1989
Donna Tupaea-Petero (b.1971)	Pihepihe, 2017
Colleen Waata Urlich (b.1939 – d.2015)	Ipu Tāniko, 2007
Dorothy Waetford (b.1967)	IOEAU, 2017
Taika Waititi (b.1975)	Ringatū, 1999 Te Rauparaha, 1999 The Bill, 1999 Mob Dollars, 1999
John Walsh (b.1954)	Pare To My Place, 2017
Marilynn Webb (b.1937 – d.2021)	Coastline 2, 1970 Cloud Landscape Central Otago II, 1974 Bluff I, 1970
Cliff Whiting (b.1937 – d.2017)	Tanagroa, 1982 Land March Series, 1975
Gary Whiting (b.1958)	Whakarongo ki Nga Tipuna I & II, 2015
Areta Wilkinson (b.1969)	Waiora, 2013 Hei Ata Āhua, 2018
Arnold Manaaki Wilson (b.1928 – d.2012)	Tane Mahuta, 1957 He Tangata, He Tangata,1956 Ringatu,1958 Hine of the Lake, 1976
Selwyn Wilson (b.1927 – d.2002)	Study of a Head, date unknown Tall Pot, 1970 Short Pot, 1970
Christina Hurihia Wirihana (b.1949)	Beyond the Wharenui, 2020
Pauline Yearbury (b.1927 – d.1977)	How Maui Made the Sun Slow Down, 1970
