= Davina Duke =

New Zealand Māori ceramics artist (born 1975)

- Born: 1975 (age 50–51); Auckland, New Zealand
- Education: NorthTec
- Occupation: Artist
- Known for: Uku (clay) works

Davina Duke (born 1975) is a Māori contemporary clay artist from New Zealand. She was included as an example of a contemporary Māori artist in the 'teacher guidance' section of the NCEA Visual Arts Standard 1.1 entitled Ngā taonga.

== Family background ==
Duke is of Ngāti Wai, Ngāti Rehua, Taitokerau, and Patuharakeke descent. She was born in Auckland in 1975, but spent her time practising in Takahiwai and Bay of Islands in a head of arts department position at a secondary school. Her son, Marino Duke, attributes much of the inspiration for his career as a Māori graffiti artist to his mother and her mentors, including Manos Nathan.

== Career ==
Duke began her artistic career by studying at NorthTec Whangārei in the 1990s and gaining knowledge and skills from artists Geoff Wilson, Manos Nathan, and Colleen Waata Urlich. She has worked as a ceramist, artist, sculptor, and art teacher in Kamo High School, Whangārei.

She is a member of Ngā Kaihanga Uku, a Maori clayworkers collective, and was the 2023 Secretary and Senior Arts Associate of the Takahiwai Māori Committee.

Duke experiments with the materiality of clay and its relationship with the land that she whakapapas to, Tai Tokerau and Takahiwai. She uses layers of varying texture and finish on her pieces, and her specific use of the sgraffito method to scrape puhoro designs into her works connects the pieces to her whakapapa (genealogy) and te ao Māori.

== Exhibitions ==
Group
Date	Title	People	Medium	Location	Source
26 January 2013 – 3 March 2013	Aho Whenua: Threads sown from Earth	Davina Duke, Hera Johns, Karuna Douglas, Ngaahina Hohaia, Noelle Jakeman, Rhona Halliday, Sofia Minson, Stevei Houkamau, Todd Douglas, Tracey Huxford, Veranoa Hetet, Victor Te Paa, Alex Nathan, Barry Te Whatu, Chris Bailey, Lewis Gardiner, Matthew McIntyre-Wilson, Stacey Gordine, and Te Rongo Kirkwood	Contemporary Maori Weaving, Ceramics, Painting, and Jewellery	Pātaka Blue Pacific Gallery	
7 October 2016 – 29 October 2016	Wā Hine	Jamie Berry, Jo Tito, Erena Koopu, Sarah Kane-Matete, Elizabeth Kerekere, Terangi Roimata Kutia-Tataurangi, Lina Marsh, Ana Te Wahiti, Peata Larkin, Tawera Tahuri, Davina Duke, Charlotte Graham, and Reremoana Sheridan	Mixed Media	Paulnache Gallery, Gisborne	
3 June 2017 – 27 August 2017	Whenua Hou: New Māori Ceramics	Aaron Scythe, Dan Couper, Davina Duke, Hana Rakena, Hera Johns, Jess Paraone, Stevei Houkamau, and Tracey Keith	Uku (clay), white raku clay	Te Whare o Rehua Sarjeant Gallery	
12 June 2020 – 12 July 2020	Te Kahui o Matariki He Toi Whakairo He Mana Tangata	Darcy Nicholas, Wi Taepa, Manos Nathan, Colleen Waata Urlich, Sandy Adsett, Lewis Gardiner, Derek Lardelli, Baye Riddell, Alex Nathan, June Grant, Wendy Whitehead, Hiwirori Maynard, Frances Stachl, Hemi MacGregor, Teresa Murray, Diane Prince, Todd Couper and Roi Toia, Susan Point, Rhonda Halliday, Maude Cooke-Davies, Davina Duke, Noelle Jakeman, Kohai Grace, Sonia Snowden and Hemi Sundgren	Mixed Media	Toi Matarau Gallery, Ōtaki	
14 November 2020 – 5 December 2020	Noho Puku	Carlette Flavell, Noelle Jakeman, Hera Johns, Annejennette Maki, and Davina Duke	Mixed Media	The Uku Shack, Takahiwai Rd	
5 December 2020 – 9 May 2021	Toi Tū Toi Ora: Contemporary Māori Art	Sandy Adsett, Hiria Anderson, Reweti Arapere, Margaret Aull, Erena Baker, Gabrielle Belz, Israel Tangaroa Birch, Buster Black, Chris Bryant-Toi, Tangimoe Clay, Paerau Corneal, Shane Cotton, Natalie Couch, Davina Duke, Bethany Edmunds, Vanessa Wairata Edwards, Zena Elliott, Elizabeth Ellis, John Bevan Ford, Jacqueline Fraser, Darryn George, Steve Gibbs, Star Gossage, Brett Graham, Charlotte Graham, Fred Graham, Lyonel Grant, Ayesha Green, Ngahuia Harrison, Chris Heaphy, Ngaahina Hohaia, Rangituhia Hollis, Ralph Hotere, John Hovell, Lonnie Hutchinson, Ana Iti, et al.	Mixed Media	Auckland Art Gallery Toi o Tāmaki	
8 November 2024 – 2 March 2025	Whenua Whatu: Māori Ceramics from The Dowse Collection	Paerau Corneal, Davina Duke, Stevei Houkāmau, Tracy Keith, Manos Nathan, Hana Rakena, Baye Riddell, Aaron Scythe, and Wi Taepa	Uku (clay)	The Dowse Art Museum, Lower Hutt	

Solo
Date	Title	Medium	Location	Source
Unknown	Large Terracotta Vase	Terracotta clay, 21 x 26cm	Auckland Art Gallery Toi o Tāmaki	
2014	Ipu Puhoro	Uku (clay)	Kokiri Putahi 2014 7th Gathering of International Visual Artist Exhibition	

== Projects ==
- In 2012, Duke was one of 100 Maori and Pacific artists representing Aotearoa at the 11th Festival of Pacific Arts in the Solomon Islands in July, attending as a member of Ngā Kaihanga Uku collective.
- In 2013, she organised a three day long mural project with three Kamo High School students and five graffiti artists. The result of the project was a 55 square metre sized mural.
- In 2017, Duke, alongside other clay artists Rhonda Halliday, Noelle Jakeman, Dorothy Waetford, and print artist Jasmine Horton attended the "Tears of DukwibahL" convention for Indigenous artists worldwide in Olympia, Washington State, at the Evergreen State College Longhouse Education and Cultural Centre. Together the artists all delved into different mediums including print, painting, carving, fibre, adornment, digital art, photography, clay, and glass, through events like presentations, exhibitions of work and trips to local tribes in the event's area. With the assistance of Creative New Zealand, eight artists from Ngā Kaihanga Uku also attended.
