= Paerau Corneal =

New Zealand potter and ceramicist

- Born: Paerau Corneal; 1961 (age 64–65); New Zealand
- Education: Waiariki Institute of Technology
- Known for: Ceramics, pottery

Paerau Corneal (born 1961) is a New Zealand ceramicist.

== Education ==
Corneal holds a certificate in craft design (1988) and a diploma in craft design Māori (1991) from Waiariki Institute of Technology. She is of Ngāti Tūwharetoa and Te Āti Haunui-A-Pāpārangi descent.

== Career ==
Corneal has exhibited both internationally and nationally since 1988. A consistent theme in her work is Māori female empowerment. From 2013 Corneal has collaborated with contemporary Māori dancer Louise Potiki Bryant. Their performance work entitled Kiri references a creation narrative of the first Māori human, Hineahuone, and opened for the 2014 Tempo Dance Festival in Auckland.

Throughout her career, Corneal has been involved in varying artist collectives. She was a founding member, alongside Manos Nathan, Baye Riddell, Wi Taepa and Colleen Waata Urlich of Ngā Kaihanga Uku, a collective of Māori clay workers. Corneal was also involved with Kauwae, a collective of Māori women artists formed in 1997; Te Rōpū o Ngā Wāhine Kai Whakairo, a collective of Māori women carvers and Haeata Women's Collective.

== Selected exhibitions ==
- 2013-5 Uku Rere, Ngā Kaihanaga Uku. Pataka Art + Museum; Whangarei Art Museum Te Manawa Toi; the Suter Art Gallery Te Aratoi o Whakatu; Waikato Museum Te Whare Taonga o Waikato; Tairawhiti Museum Te Whare Taonga o te Tairawhiti; and Te Manawa Museum of Art, Science + History.
- 2014 Slip Cast, The Dowse Art Museum
- 2009 Kauwae 09, Kauwae Group, a national collective of Mäori women artists. Tairawhiti Museum.
- 2005 Manawa: Pacific heartbeat. Spirit Wrestler Gallery, Vancouver.
- 2003 Kiwa: Pacific connections: Maori art from Aotearoa. Spirit Wrestler Gallery, Vancouver.
- 2003-5 Ngā Toko Rima, Ngā Kaihanga Uku. Museum of New Zealand Te Papa Tongarewa; Tinakori Gallery, Wellington.
- 2002 Sisters Yakkananna/Kahui Mareikura. Tandanya National Aboriginal Cultural Institute, Adelaide.
- 1998 Uku! Uku! Uku! International Festival of the Arts, Wellington
- 1992 Treasures of the Underworld. World Expo, Seville; Museum of New Zealand Te Papa Tongarewa.

== Collections ==
Corneal's work is held in the collection of the Museum of New Zealand Te Papa Tongarewa.
