= Charlotte Graham =

New Zealand painter

Charlotte Graham (born 1972) is a renowned contemporary Māori artist living in her tribal homelands of Auckland. She is a mandated artist for her iwi Ngāti Whanaunga. She sits on the Te Uru Contemporary Gallery board and is also part of the Te Atinga Committee. Her works are held at the Auckland Art Gallery, Toi o Tāmaki, the Chartwell collection, James Wallace Collection, many universities and private collections throughout the world. Of Māori and Scottish descent, Graham identifies with Te Kawerau ā Maki, Ngāti Mahuta, Ngāi Tai ki Tāmaki, Ngāti Whanaunga, Ngāti Pāoa Ngāti Tamaoho Te Akitai Waiohua and Ngāti Kōtimana.

== Early life ==
Charlotte Graham was born in 1972 in Perth, Western Australia, to Māori parents from New Zealand. The family moved back to Auckland, New Zealand six months after Graham was born. Graham has a number of relatives who have been practicing artists, including aunt Emily Karaka, uncle Mikaara Kirkwood, cousins Te Rongo Kirkwood and Reuben Kirkwood. Graham's two older sisters Teresa Grahsm and Raewyn Graham are also artists.

Graham attended Mount Roskill Grammar School.

== Education ==
Graham graduated with a Post- graduate diploma in Māori Visual Arts (Honours) from Massey University in 2001. She studied under Robert Jahnke, Shane Cotton and Kura Te Waru Rewiri as one of the first graduate students for the degree.

After completing her post-graduate studies in Māori visual art, Graham trained as a teacher (Auckland University) and worked at secondary schools in Auckland, including Māori boarding school St Stephens, while continuing to make art. She also worked full time as a Kaihangatoi (Māori art tutor) at Mason Clinic, WDHB, forensic psychiatric services.

== Career ==
Graham's art practice draws on her Māori heritage to explore critical issues that affect New Zealand society such as racism, cultural stereotyping and land rights, particularly the controversial foreshore and seabed legislation. Frequently her works incorporate Treaty of Waitangi and Māori motifs. Graham cites her grandmother, Rose Isobel Simons, as a key creative influence on her life. Graham believes that the foreshore and seabed controversy was the issue that gave her the political drive as an artist.

=== Solo exhibitions ===
- Trouble in Paradise at Oedipus Rex Gallery, Auckland, 2004. Graham presented both text and pictorial devices to address the New Zealand foreshore and seabed controversy. Her imagery included traditional Māori motifs and European numerals.
- Nga Karetao at Oedipus Rex Gallery, Auckland, 2005. This exhibition featured karetao (puppets) carved to represent the MPs holding each of the seven Māori seats in Parliament.
- Kaitiaki at Mangere Arts Centre, Auckland in 2015.
- Te Waiora installation work in Auckland's Britomart precinct.

=== Group exhibitions ===
- For at ASA Gallery, Auckland, 2002. This group show also presented works by Katherine Claypole, Leigh Millward and Louise Stevenson.
- Hoki-mai at Oedipus Rex Gallery, Auckland, 2003. Collaborative exhibition featuring works by Graham and Natasha Keating. Graham presented works in ink and bitumen on paper, using Māori motifs.
- Porarurau 'CONFUSION 'NOT ONE SIZE FITS ALL' at Oedipus Rex Gallery, Auckland, 2004. This group show presented works from six Māori artists (three painters and three sculptors) responding to the rising problem of underachievement among Māori students in mainstream schools. The other artists featured were Makareta Jahnke, Manu Scott, Amy Taite, Jason Te Whare and Donna Tupaea.
- Permissions at Lane Gallery, Auckland, 2004. This group show presented works from five Māori women artists offering interpretations on the theme 'permissions.' The other artists were Lonnie Hutchinson, Claudine Muru, Donna Tupaea and Kate Pie. Graham's works in this show explore permissions as a birthright afforded Māori as tangata whenua, with reference to the Crown's actions regarding the foreshore and seabed legislation. She incorporates Treaty of Waitangi text and Māori narratives to condemn the legislation and how it impinges on birthrights for Māori.
- Workshop Style at Taketake Gallery, Whakatāne, 2004. This exhibition presented a selection of works by young Māori artists in a variety of mediums. Other artists presented included Rangi Kipa, Claudine Muru, Natalie Robertson, Aimee Ratana, Donna Tupaea and Andrea Hopkins.
- Work on Paper at George Perry Gallery, Tauranga, 2004. This group exhibition presented works from eight New Zealand artists who work on paper. Graham presented a series of four works which made political statements such as "Miti mai te arero na te mea, tipi ra i te whenua" ("Sharpen you tongue for the land continues to depart").
- Nga Maunga Toi o Matariki at Lopdell House Gallery, Titirangi, Auckland in 2005. This exhibition celebrated Matariki, and featured works by Robyn Kahukiwa, Emily Karaka, Priscilla Cowie and James Webster.
- Tikitiki at Lane Gallery, Auckland, 2005. This group show of ten contemporary Māori artists explored the imagery of tiki in all its varied representations. Other artists included Jodi Coromandel Tautari, Donna Tupaea, Julie Kipa, Aimee Ratana, Christina Wirihana, Saffronn Te Ratana and Ngataiharuru Taepa.
- Atamira: Māori in the City at the ASB Showgrounds, Auckland in 2007.
- The Kauri Project: Poster Series at Lopdell House Gallery, Auckland in 2014.
- He Tirohanga ki Tai: Dismantling the Doctrine of Discovery at Tairāwhiti Museum, Gisborne in 2018. This group show presented works challenging perceptions around James Cook's "discovery" of New Zealand.
- Toi Tū Toi Ora: Contemporary Māori Art at Auckland Art Gallery, 2020-2021. Graham has an interactive work called Te Hau Whakaroa (2020)

== Awards and residencies ==
- Fundación Mar Adentro residency recipient in Bosque Peheun, Chile, May 2017. The Fundación Mar Adentro is a private foundation based in Santiago, Chile, which aims to promote natural and cultural heritage in society.

== Personal life ==
Graham's has four children.
