= Ngā Kaihanga Uku =

New Zealand collective of Māori clayworkers

Ngā Kaihanga Uku is a New Zealand collective of Māori Clayworkers. They formed in 1986 during a Ngā Puna Waihanga (Māori Artists and Writers collective) gathering, under the leadership of Baye Riddell and Manos Nathan.

== Contemporary Māori clay artists ==
Ngā Kaihanga Uku was formed to support the growing use of clay within Māori-based art practices in the 1980s. Although customary Māori society was not a ceramic culture, the intrinsic properties and physical relationship of clay being from the earth offered Māori clay artists a new avenue through which to portray Māori lives and knowledge. Hineahuone for example, who is considered to be the first human, was formed by clay at Kurawaka. As Wi Taepa states, ‘Clay is more than an artistic material, it is a blood relative. Working with it requires an understanding of the genealogical links between humanity and Papatūānuku (earth).

== Notable members ==
Members include:

- Paerau Corneal (founding member)
- Colleen Waata Urlich (founding member)
- Wi Taepa (founding member)
- Davina Duke

== Selected exhibitions ==
- 2013-4 Uku Rere: Ngā Kaihanga Uku & beyond Pataka Art + Museum, Whangarei Art Museum: Te Manawa Toi, The Suter Art Gallery: Te Aratoi o Whakatu, Waikato Museum: Te Whare Taonga o Waikato, Tairawhiti Museum: Te Whare Taonga o te Tairawhiti, and Te Manawa Museum of Art, Science + History, Palmerston North.
- 2003-5 Ngā Toko Rima Ngā Kaihanga Uku. Museum of New Zealand Te Papa Tongarewa; Tinakori Gallery, Wellington.
- 1998 Uku! Uku! Uku! International Festival of the Arts, Wellington.
- 1994 Kurawaka The Dowse Art Museum, Lower Hutt.

== Publications ==
- Kedgley, H. Nicholas, D. (2013) Uku Rere: Ngā Kaihanga Uku & Beyond. Pataka Art + Museum, Porirua City.
- Urlich, Colleen Waata. (2009) Nga Kaihanga Uku: National Collective of Māori Clayworkers Dargaville NZ.
- Riddell, Baye. (2023) Ngā Kaihanga Uku Māori Clay Artists. Te Papa Press. Wellington, NZ.
