= Ngataiharuru Taepa =

New Zealand artist

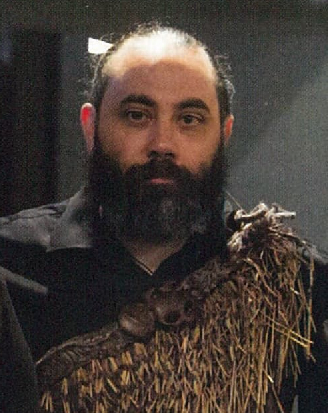
- Born: 1976 (age 49–50); Upper Hutt, New Zealand

Academic background
- Education: Massey University

Academic work
- Institutions: Massey University

Ngataiharuru Taepa (born 1976) is a New Zealand artist and academic. His art often explores traditional Māori kōwhaiwhai (rafter painting) forms.

== Early life and family ==
Taepa was born in Upper Hutt in 1976, and is of Māori (Te Āti Awa, Te Arawa) and Pākehā descent. His father is artist Wi Taepa, his brother Kereama Taepa is also an artist, and his paternal great uncle was Ohinemutu carver Doc Taepa. His early influences included his maternal grandmother, who was a painter. Taepa attended Te Aute College in Hawke's Bay, during which time his art teacher worked on kōwhaiwhai panels for the school marae, Te Whare o Rangi, which left a significant impression on Taepa.

Taepa recalls that when his father began to study art at Whitireia Polytechnic: "I would sit around the kitchen table and listen to people like Manos Nathan, Darcy Nicholas, Robyn Kahukiwa and Ngamoana Raureti. All these people were talking about the issues of the time. ... I have been really fortunate in that way and it's shaped my work and how I work. It inspired me and also gave me a little bit of knowledge, hearing about the struggles they faced as Māori artists, the different issues and how they have dealt with them.' Taepa later a Bachelor of Māori Visual Arts from Massey University in 2000, followed by a Masters in Māori Visual Arts from Massey University in 2003. Taepa focused his masters study on kōwhaiwhai panels.

== Career ==
Taepa is known particularly for his works that use Western art techniques to explore traditional kōwhaiwhai forms. He reproduces the intricate forms of kowhaiwhai using modern materials and manufacturing processes including digital routers, acrylic laminates, stencils on PVC pipes and steel, and digitally carved plywood. The artist has said,

Kōwhaiwhai is an expression of the way our ancestors saw the world in their time. Their achievement, using positive and negative spaces, was to have the colours interact simultaneously – as opposed to how most people think now. Now we're taught to see the positive space and not the space around it. It's one of the simple conventions of kōwhaiwhai, but for me it's achieving excellence through simplicity. How do you get to that level? That's what fires me up.

Taepa cites Robert Jahnke, Shane Cotton and Kura Te Waru Rewiri (who all taught him at art school) as significant influences, along with Māori language revivalists including Taiarahia Black, Ian Christensen and Pare Richardson.

In 2015, Taepa collaborated with Michel Tuffery on a light display commissioned to mark the opening of Pukeahu National War Memorial Park in Wellington.

In 2000, Taepa was elected onto Te Atinga, the visual arts committee of the Māori arts advocacy organisation Toi Māori Aotearoa.

As of 2015, Taepa is the Kaihautu Toi Māori – Director of Māori Arts at the College of Creative Arts at Massey University.

Taepa's work is held in a number of public collections including the Museum of New Zealand Te Papa Tongarewa, Wellington City Council and the Auckland War Memorial Museum.

== Exhibitions ==
Selected exhibitions:

- 2001 Purangiaho – Seeing Clearly, Auckland Art Gallery
- 2002 Mangopare, Pataka Art + Museum, Porirua
- 2005 Manawa Taki – The Pulsing Heart, City Gallery Wellington
- 2005 RāHui: Principle of Regulation, Te Manawa, Palmerston North
- 2007 Telecom Prospect 2007: New Art New Zealand, City Gallery Wellington
- 2009 Mua Ki Muri, Pataka Art + Museum, Porirua
- 2009 PLASTIC MĀORI – A Tradition of Innovation, The Dowse Art Museum, Lower Hutt
- 2010 Double Vision: When Artists Collaborate, Pataka Art + Museum
- 2011 Ka kata te po: Hemi Macgregor, Saffronn Te Ratana and Ngataiharuru Taepa, Te Manawa
- 2013 Ka kata te po shown as part of the 5th Auckland Triennial, Auckland Art Gallery
- 2015 Te Tini a Pitau: 12 years of kowhaiwhai, Pataka Art + Museum
