= Wi Taepa =

New Zealand ceramicist

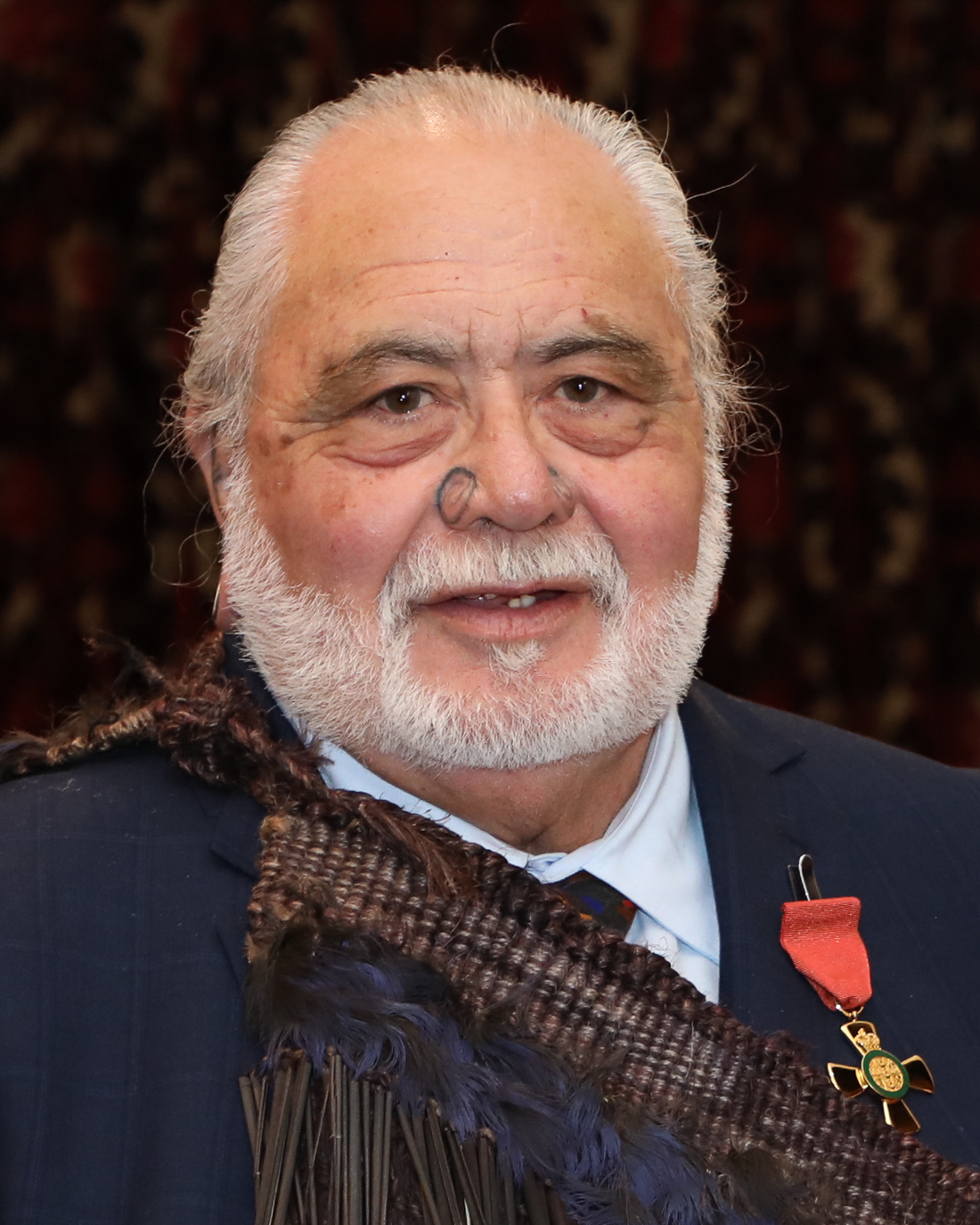
Taepa in 2023

Wi Te Tau Pirika Taepa ONZM (born 1946, in Wellington) is a significant figure in contemporary New Zealand ceramics, and a leading figure in contemporary Māori clay art.

== Early career and training ==
After leaving school, Taepa worked as a window display designer for a Wellington department store for five years. He enlisted with the New Zealand Army in 1968 and served in Vietnam from 1970 to 1972.

After his military career, Taepa worked as a prison officer at Rimutaka Prison, where he used art as a way of connecting with prisoners, teaching wood and bone carving and leather and copper work. He also took part in carving two pou for the Michael Fowler Centre in Wellington at this time and worked on the Orongomai meeting house in Upper Hutt.

In 1985 Taepa became a social worker at Kohitere Boys Farm and again introduced art as a form of connection and rehabilitation. He began working with clay at this time as obtaining wood for carving was expensive and the tools potentially dangerous.

After the closure of Kohitere Taepa enrolled in the four-year course for the New Zealand Certificate of Craft Design at Whitireia Polytechnic, graduating in 1992. In 1999 he graduated from Wanganui Polytechnic with a Bachelor of Fine Arts. In 2007 he received a Masters of Māori Visual Arts from Massey University, Palmerston North.

== Career as a clay artist ==
Taepa dates his interest in clay back to the 1960s, when he saw an exhibition of ceramics by an English artist, Jo Munro, at Willeston Gallery in Wellington. In 1985, while living in Levin and working at Kohitere, he attended night classes with the Levin Pottery Club. He prefers to handbuild his work rather than throw it on the wheel.

In 1986 Taepa, alongside Baye Riddell, Paerau Corneal, Colleen Waata Urlich and Manos Nathan formed Ngā Kaihanga Uku, a collective of Māori clayworkers. In 2013 Uku Rere, an exhibition of the five founding members, was held at Pataka Art + Museum. In 2014 Uku Rere subsequently toured to Whangarei Art Museum: Te Manawa Toi, the Suter Art Gallery: Te Aratoi o Whakatu, Waikato Museum: Te Whare Taonga o Waikato, Tairawhiti Museum: Te Whare Taonga o te Tairawhiti, and Te Manawa Museum of Art, Science + History, Palmerston North.

Taepa has exhibited both nationally and internationally including a solo exhibition Wi Taepa at City Gallery Wellington (2012), Ngā Toko Rima at the Museum of New Zealand Te Papa Tongarewa (2005), Kiwa at Spirit Wrestler Gallery, Vancouver (2003), and the National Gallery of Zimbabwe (1995). He has received support from Creative New Zealand to attend residencies and carry out research.

In 2016 a major survey of Taepa's work, Wi Taepa: Retrospect was organised by Pataka Art + Museum. The exhibition travelled to Auckland Art Gallery in 2018.

Taepa has continued to teach, including at Te Whare Wānanga o Awanuiārangi. He says 'I'm interested in using clay as a form of creative expression. Teaching is also an art, so combining clay and teaching is an enjoyable challenge'.

In the 2022 Queen's Birthday and Platinum Jubilee Honours, Taepa was appointed an Officer of the New Zealand Order of Merit, for services to Māori art, particularly ceramics.

== Public collections ==
Taepa's work in held in private collections and also in public collections including the Museum of New Zealand Te Papa Tongarewa and Auckland Art Gallery.

== Family ==
Taepa descends from a line of Te Arawa master carvers. He assisted his uncle, Taunu Tai Taepa, with carving the pulpit in Rangiātea Church, Ōtaki. He also belongs to the Ngāti Pikiao, Te-Roro-o-Te-Rangi and Te Āti Awa tribes.

Taepa's sons Ngataiharuru Taepa and Kereama Taepa are also respected contemporary artists. The three artists showed work together in 2013 in the exhibition Papa Tipu at Expressions Whirinaki in Upper Hutt.

== Further information ==
- Wi Taepa: Retrospect, exhibition catalogue, Pātaka Art + Museum, 2016
- Clay artist Wi Taepa’s retrospective, Standing Room Only, RNZ, 29 April 2018
- John Hurrell, The Clay Artistry of Wi Taepa, EyeContact, 4 June 2018
- Bridget Reweti, A Hole in the Pocket (on Māori artists working with ceramics), The Pantograph Punch, 11 June 2018
