= Huhana Smith =

Contemporary Māori artist

Huhana Smith MNZM
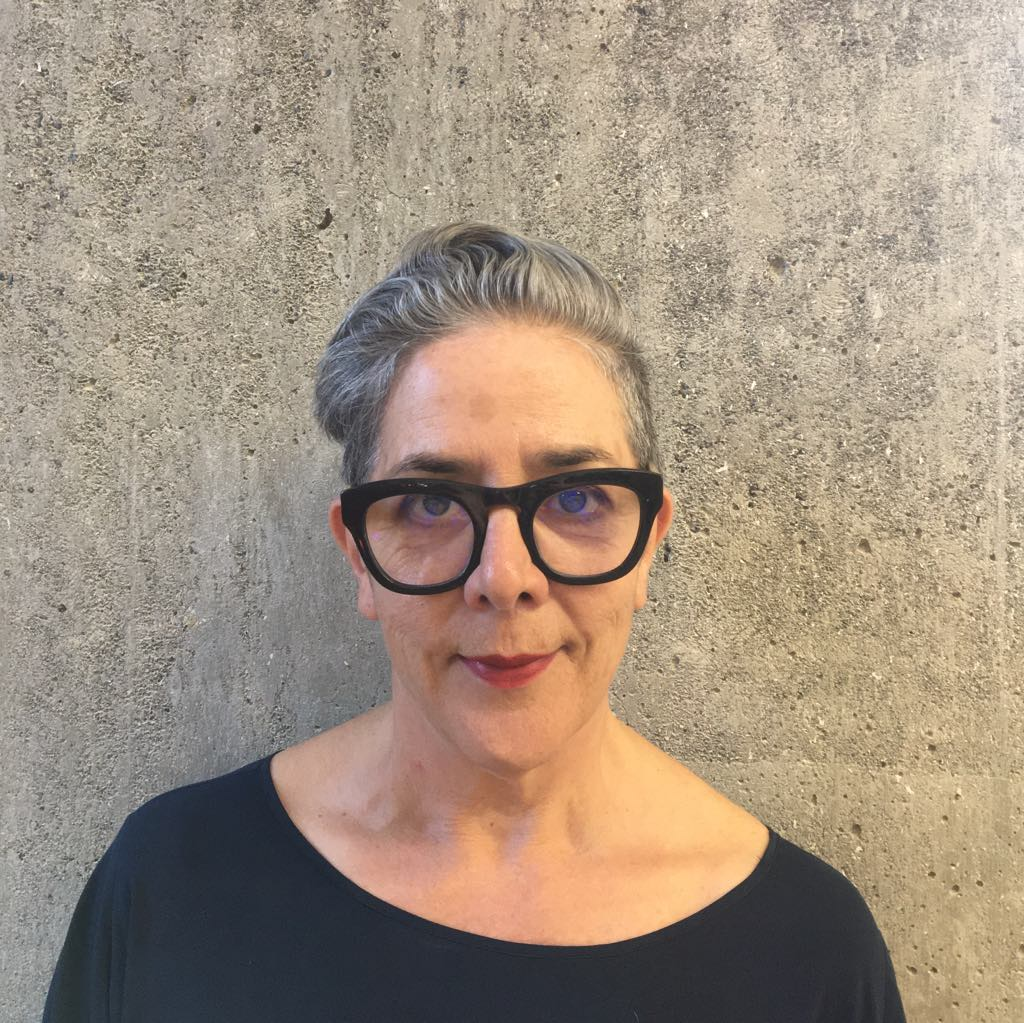
- Smith in 2019
- Born: 1962 (age 63–64); Yarrawonga, Victoria, Australia
- Known for: Painting
- Notable work: E Tū Ake: Māori Standing Strong

Susan Margaret Smith MNZM (born 1962), known as Huhana Smith, is a contemporary New Zealand artist and academic, and head of Whiti o Rehua School of Art at Massey University. Between 2003 and 2009, she was senior curator Māori at Te Papa.

== Background ==
Born in 1962 in Yarrawonga, Victoria, Australia, Smith is of Māori descent and affiliates to Ngāti Tukorehe and Ngāti Raukawa ki te Tonga. Smith had an art practice in Melbourne, Australia in the late 1980s. She came to New Zealand in 1993 to pursue studies in Māori language. She was the first graduate from the Toioho ki Āpiti (Bachelor of Māori Visual Arts) programme at Massey in 1997. She also holds a Postgraduate Diploma in Museum Studies (1998) and a PhD in Māori Studies from Massey University.

== Career ==
Smith has worked at Te Puni Kōkiri and at Te Papa. Whilst at Te Papa she was the general editor of a number of books about Māori arts where she profiled contemporary artists such as Wi Taepa, Lisa Reihana, Kura Te Waru Rewiri and Saffronn Te Ratana, and also taonga tuku iho (ancestral Māori treasures) from Te Papa's collections.

In 2016 Smith took the head role at Whiti o Rehua School of Arts at Massey University in Wellington.

Smith's recent research, part of a large interdisciplinary project with Vision Mātauranga Deep South Challenge National Science Challenge funding combines mātauranga Māori methods with science to actively address climate change concerns for coastal Māori lands in Horowhenua-Kāpiti. It was exhibited in the Dowse Art Museum as part of the exhibition This Time of Useful Consciousness: Political Ecology Now in 2017.

== Publications and exhibitions ==
- Taiāwhio: Conversations with Contemporary Māori Artists, 2002, Te Papa Press.
- Taiāwhio 2: 18 New Conversations Contemporary Māori Artists, 2007, Te Papa Press.
- E Tū Ake: Māori Standing Strong, 2011, Te Papa Press.

== Honours and awards ==
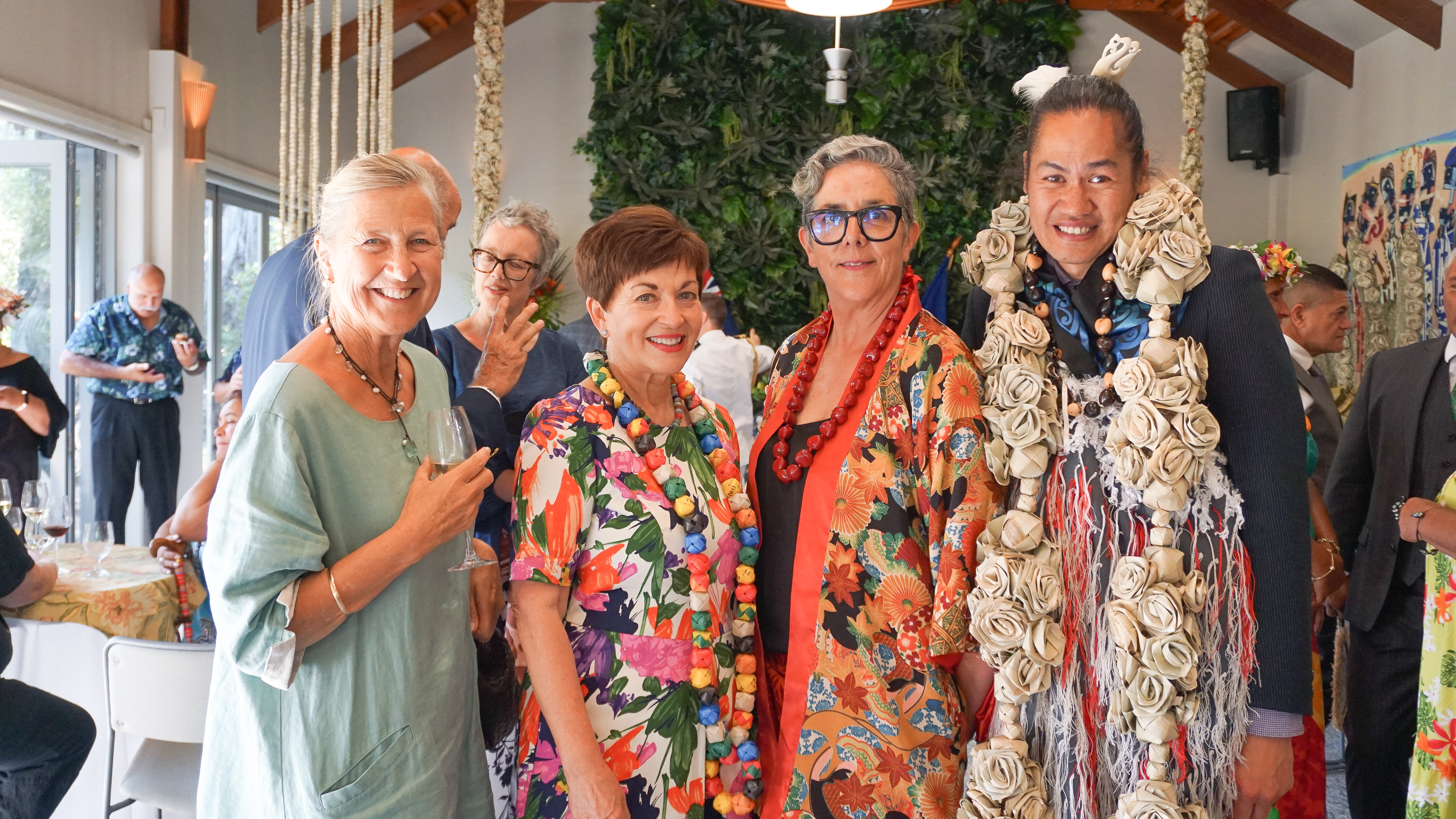
Smith (second from right) at a reception in Auckland in 2020 for Pacifica Mamas – Matairangi Mahi Toi. The governor-general, Dame Patsy Reddy, is second from left.

Smith was a finalist in the Art Waikato National Art Awards in 2000 and 2002.

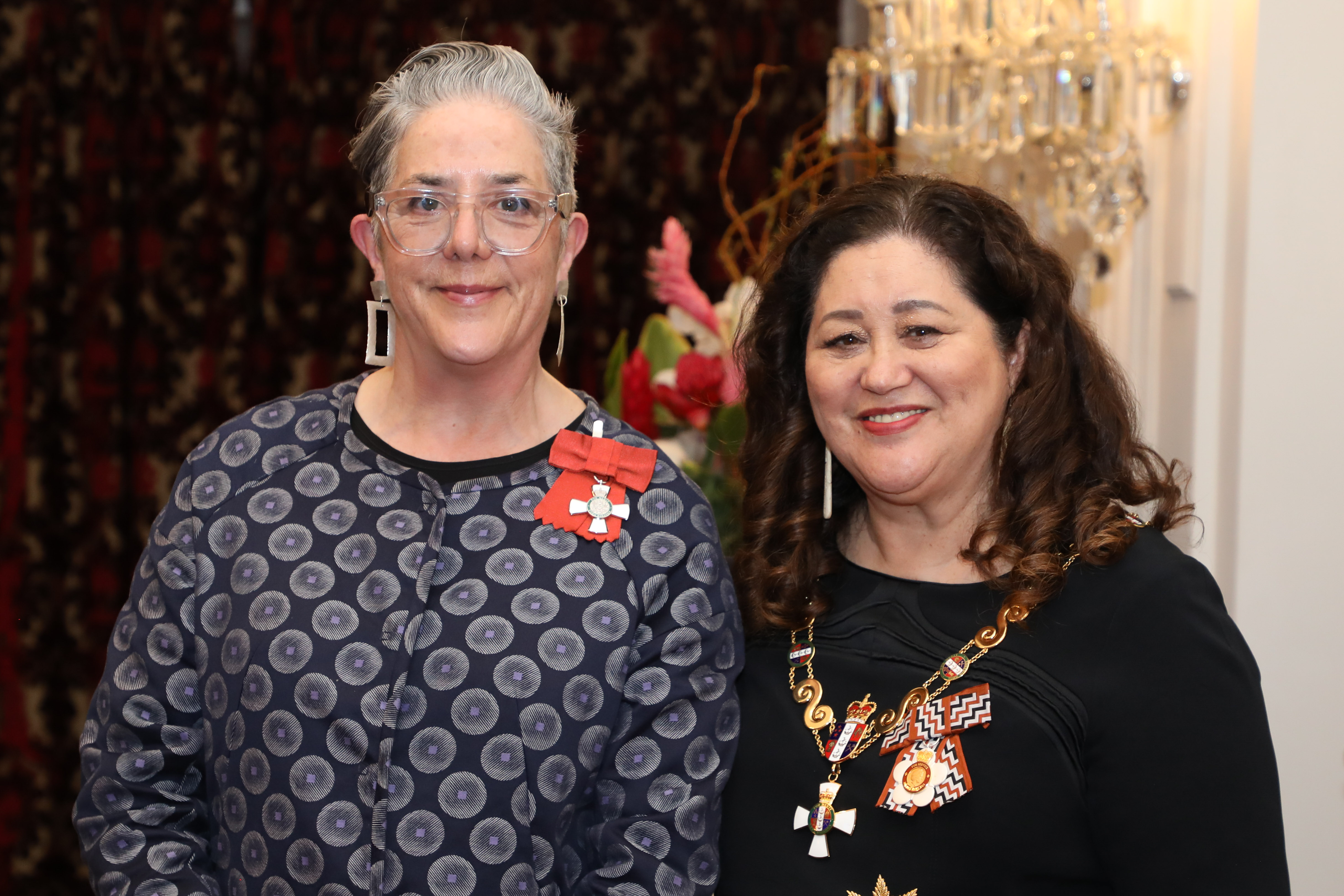
Smith (left), after her investiture as a Member of the New Zealand Order of Merit by the governor-general, Dame Cindy Kiro, at Government House, Wellington, on 22 September 2023

In the 2023 King's Birthday and Coronation Honours, Smith was appointed a Member of the New Zealand Order of Merit, for services to the environment.
