= The Head of John Doe =

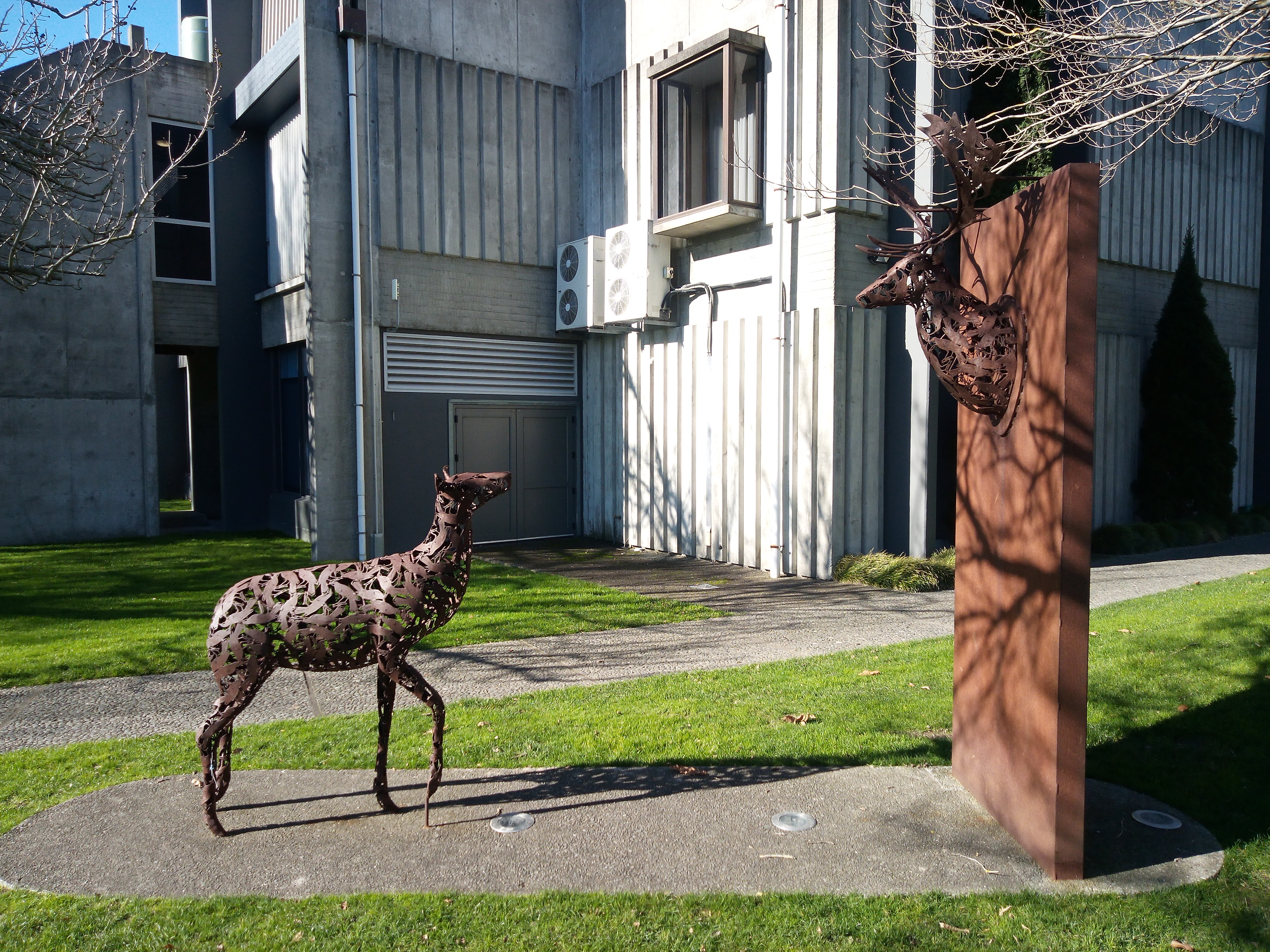
- "The Head of John Doe" in 2026, showing the replacement doe
- Interactive map of The Head of John Doe
- Location: Palmerston North, New Zealand
- Coordinates: 40°21′27″S 175°36′32″E
- Designer: Sean Crawford
- Material: Corten steel
- Opening date: 2022

The Head of John Doe is a Corten steel sculpture by Sean Crawford in Palmerston North, New Zealand. The sculpture depicts a doe staring at the head of a buck mounted on a wall. Both are decorated with Huia icons. It is located between Te Manawa and the Palmerston North Convention Centre.

The sculpture was unveiled in June 2022. In January 2024 the doe was stolen, prompting pleas for its return. A replacement doe was installed in 2025.
