= Colleen Waata Urlich =

New Zealand ceramicist

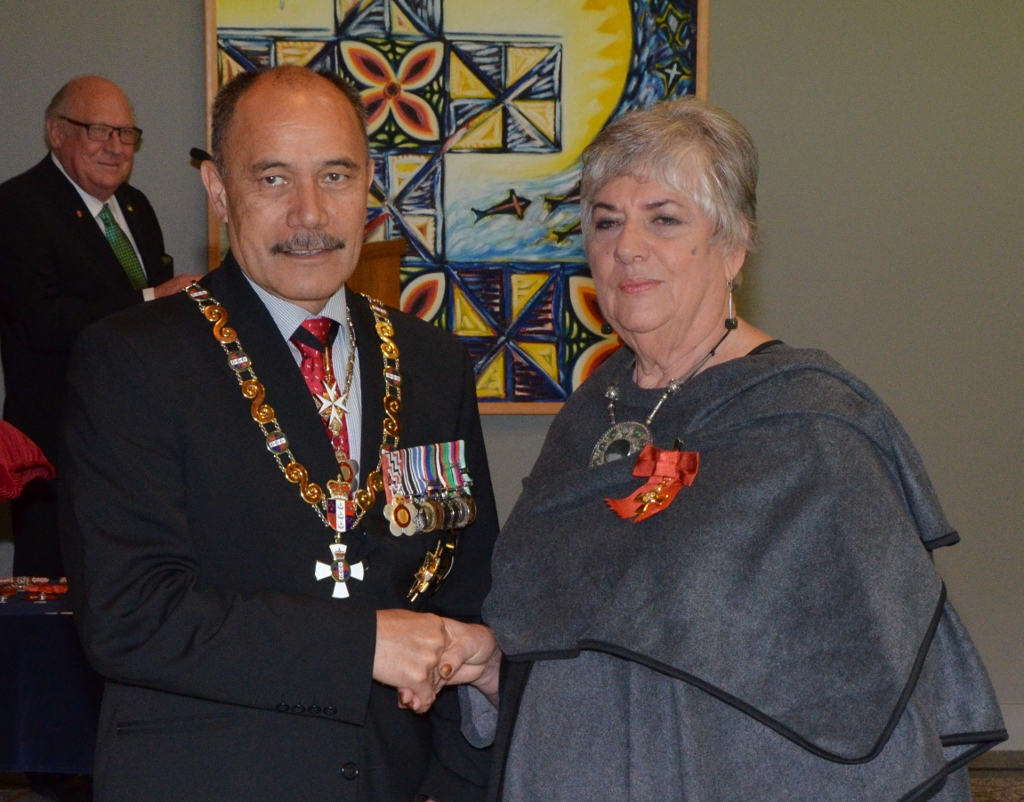
Urlich on 26 August 2015, after her investiture as an Officer of the New Zealand Order of Merit by the governor-general, Sir Jerry Mateparae

Colleen Elizabeth Waata-Urlich ONZM (1939 – 10 September 2015) was a New Zealand ceramicist. Of Māori descent, she belonged to Te Popoto o Ngāpuhi ki Kaipara and Te Rarawa. Through education, involvement in Māori art collectives and production of exhibited work, Urlich was dedicated to the development of Māori art.

== Education ==
Urlich worked as a trained teacher and later returned to study. She gained a Master of Fine Arts with honours from the University of Auckland’s Elam School of Fine Arts and a Bachelor of Applied Arts.

Urlich conducted research on the influence of Lapita pottery patterns within the Pacific. This research was the basis of her Master of Fine Arts with a subsequent paper published in Pacific Archaeology: Assessments and Prospects.

This research also influenced Urlich's clay work, which is based on customary knowledge and often acknowledges Pacific genealogy and female Māori deities.

== Artist collectives ==
Ngā Kaihanga Uku was founded in 1986 in order to support Māori Clay workers. Urlich was a founding member of Ngā Kaihanga Uku, alongside Paerau Corneal, Baye Riddell, Manos Nathan and Wi Taepa.

She was a committee member for Te Atinga, a platform that supports contemporary Māori artists that operates under Toi Māori. She was also a member of Kauwae, a group of Māori women artists that formed in 1997.

Urlich was a member of Ngā Puna Waihanga, a collective of New Zealand Māori Artists and Writers that formed in 1973. For the exhibition Kohia Ko Taikaka Anake, which was developed in collaboration with Ngā Puna Waihanga, The Museum of New Zealand Te Papa Tongarewa and Te Waka Toi, Urlich was the regional organiser for Te Tai Tokerau.

In January 2015, Urlich, along with seven other artists with links to Te Tai Tokerau, travelled to Yeppoon, Queensland, to work for 12 days with a group of Aboriginal artists.

== Recognition ==
In the 2015 New Year Honours, Urlich was appointed an Officer of the New Zealand Order of Merit, for services to Māori art. She was also a justice of the peace.

== Death ==
Urlich died in Dargaville on 10 September 2015, less than a week after fellow Northland Māori potter Manos Nathan.

== Selected exhibitions ==
- 2013-5 Uku Rere Ngā Kaihanaga Uku. Pataka Art + Museum, Whangarei Art Museum: Te Manawa Toi, The Suter Art Gallery: Te Aratoi o Whakatu, Waikato Museum: Te Whare Taonga o Waikato, Tairawhiti Museum: Te Whare Taonga o te Tairawhiti, and Te Manawa Museum of Art, Science + History, Palmerston North.
- 2011 MAORI ART MARKet Porirua
- 2009 Kauwae 09 Kauwae Group, a national collective of Mäori women artists. Tairawhiti Museum, Gisborne.
- 2008 Toi Maori: Small Treasures San Francisco
- 2008 Festival of Pacific Arts Pago Pago, American Samoa.
- 2007 MAORI ART MARKet Wellington
- 2006 Maori Art Meets America San Francisco, United States.
- 2006 Manawa Spirit Wrestler Gallery, Vancouver
- 2003 Kiwa: Pacific Connections, Vancouver, Canada.
- 2002 Sisters Yakkananna/Kahui Mareikura Adelaide, Australia.
- 1999 Fusion: Tradition and Discovery, Vancouver, Canada.
- 1998 Kauwae Gisborne Museum and Arts, Gisborne
- 1997-8 Haka, London, Edinburgh, Belfast, Great Britain.
- 1997 Te Atinga Bath, England.
- 1995 Mana Wahine Tucson, United States.

== Publications ==
- Urlich, C.E. Waata. 2003. A new perspective: new blooms from ancient seeds, pp. 387–392 in C. Sand (ed.) Pacific Archaeology: assessments and prospects. Vol 15.
- Urlich, Colleen Waata. & Hakaraia, Libby. 2008 Te Kāhui o Matariki. Raupo, North Shore City.
- Urlich, Collen. 2002.Aho : the line that goes beyond the present to the past. MFA Dissertation University of Auckland.

== Further information ==
- Justine Murray, Nga Kaihanga Uku - The Maori Clay makers collective, Te Ahi Kaa, Radio New Zealand, 28 July 2013
- Bridget Reweti, A Hole in the Pocket (on Māori artists working with ceramics), The Pantograph Punch, 11 June 2018
