= Vanessa Wairata Edwards =

New Zealand printmaker

- Born: 1980 (age 45–46)
- Education: Universal College of Learning, Massey University
- Known for: printmaking
- Elected: Te Ātinga Contemporary Māori Visual Arts
- Website: https://www.vanessawairataedwardsart.com/

Vanessa Wairata Edwards is a New Zealand artist based in Whanganui who works primarily in printmaking. Her artwork explores cultural sovereignty as an Indigenous Māori woman, with some held at both Toi o Tāmaki Auckland Art Gallery and Christchurch Art Gallery Te Puna o Waiwhetū. She is a founding member of the Toi Whakaata Māori Print Collective, and a committee member of Te Ātinga Contemporary Māori Visual Arts .

== Biography ==
Vanessa Wairata Edwards was born in 1980 and is of Ngāti Tūwharetoa, Whakatōhea, Ngāti Kuri, and Ngāti Kahu descent. She is based in Whanganui.

Edwards primarily works in printmaking. She also incorporates weaving–either through the use of woven surfaces or including weaving patterns in the design. Her art works explore tikanga Māori and matauranga Māori as key themes. As well as being an artist, she is a full time secondary school art teacher.

In 2002, Edwards graduated from the Quay School of the Arts, Universal College of Learning (UCOL), Whanganui, majoring in printmaking. In 2006, she was a founding member of Toi Whakaata Māori Print Collective. In 2006, she was invited to SGC International in Madison, Wisconsin.

In 2020-2021, Edwards' work was included in Toi Tū Toi Ora: Contemporary Māori Art at the Toi o Tāmaki Auckland Art Gallery which was the most visited exhibition at the gallery since 1989. Also in 2020, Social Amnesia, an exhibition by Edwards, was exhibited at Te Kōputu a te whanga a Toi, Whakatāne.

Since 2021 she has been a member of Te Ātinga Contemporary Māori Visual Arts committee. Alongside her in 2025 this committee includes Margaret Aull (Co-chair), Chris Bryant, Regan Balzer (Co-Chair), Tāwera Tahuri (Secretary), Bonita Bigham, Rewiti Arapere, Randal Leach and others.

She was part of an exhibition, Nāu te rourou, nāku te rourou - With your basket and my basket, with Marwin Begaye and Alexis Neal at Arts + Literature Laboratory in Madison in 2022. Later in 2022, she was part of the Hā exhibition at the Toi Pōneke Arts Centre, Wellington, which featured twelve wāhine (women) artists.

In 2024, she graduated with a Masters in Maori Visual Arts from Massey University. As part of her masters project, an exhibition of her prints, Taa E Kōrero Ana – Marks That Speak, was on display at the Niven Gallery, Taupō.

== Artworks ==
Edwards printmaking explores an approach to 'print as an indigenous Māori'. In her artwork is expression of self-determination cultural sovereignty.

Edwards has several artworks in museum and gallery collections across New Zealand, including:

- Hinenui-Te-Po, 2018, Toi o Tāmaki Auckland Art Gallery
- AKA, 2023, Christchurch Art Gallery Te Puna o Waiwhetū
- Puna, 2023, Christchurch Art Gallery Te Puna o Waiwhetū
- Whakapono, 2023, Christchurch Art Gallery Te Puna o Waiwhetū
