= Ngaahina Hohaia =

New Zealand visual artist (born 1975)

- Born: 1975 (age 50–51)
- Movement: Contemporary Māori Art

Ngahina Hohaia (born 1975) is a visual artist of Te Āti Awa, Ngāti Ruanui, Ngāti Moeahu, Ngāti Haupoto and Greek descent from Parihaka, New Zealand.

== Biography ==
Hohaia has artistic influences from her grandmothers. Her Māori grandmother was a weaver and Greek grandmother was a painter.

Ngaahina gained a Masters in Māori Visual Arts from Toioho ki Āpiti in 2009 and in 2010 received the Arts Foundation of New Zealand New Generation Award. In 2007 Hohaia received the Te Waka Toi Ngā Karapihi award.

== Work ==
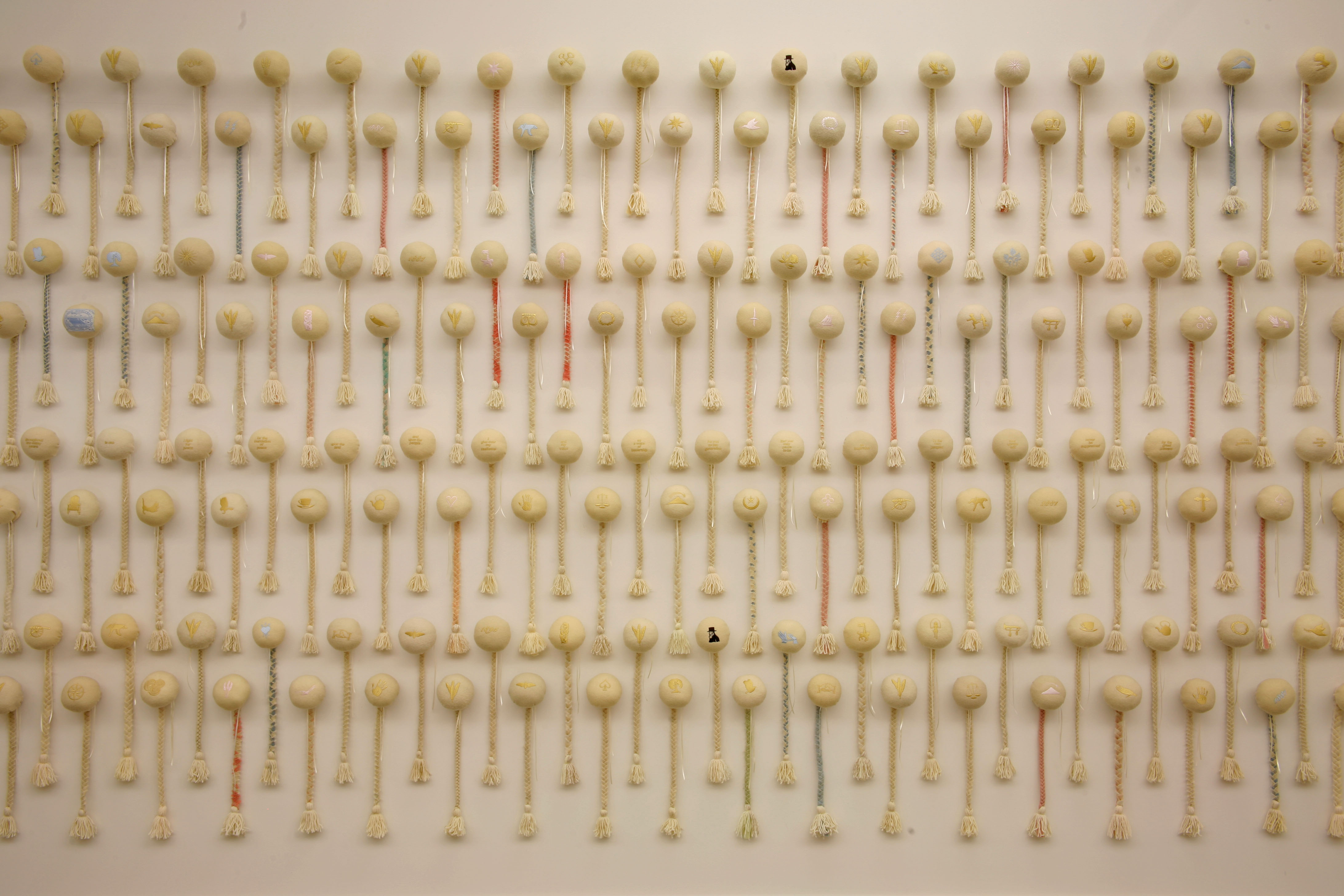

Her work often draws from Parihaka history and has been exhibited nationally and internationally. Her contemporary art work uses traditional fibres combined with metals and silks. Items she has created include jewellery and adornment pieces, sculpture and large-scale multimedia installations.

Wellington's City Gallery opened a new gallery space Roderick and Gillian Deane Gallery for Maori and Pacific Art in 2009 with a large installation by Hohaia made up of over 500 poi created from natural fibre including woolen blankets. The work honours the messages of peace from Parihaka leaders Te Whiti o Rongomai and Tohu Kakahi.

== Exhibitions ==
- 2016 Tools of Oppression and Liberation Pataka Art + Museum, Porirua
- 2013 Navigation Pacifica, Casula Powerhouse Arts Centre, Sydney
- 2013 Call of Taranaki, Puke Ariki, New Plymouth
- 2013 Matatau, Bath Street Gallery, Auckland
- 2010 Manawa Wera - Defiant Chants Objectspace, Auckland
- 2009 Ngahina Hohaia City Gallery Wellington
- 2009 Fibra Spirare, Rydals Museum, Sweden - showcased five contemporary New Zealand textile artists

== Personal ==
Hundreds of people gathered at Ōwairaka mountain in Auckland in 2020 in solidarity for Hohaia after she made a complaint with the New Zealand police about a racial attack on her. Māori leaders spoke out against the decision made by the police not to prosecute.
