= NorthTec =

Polytechnic in Northland, New Zealand

Coordinates: 35°44′28.84″S 174°18′19.61″E

- Tai Tokerau Wānanga
- Former names: Northland Community College (1978–1987), Northland Polytechnic (1987–2006)
- Type: Public NZ TEI
- Established: 1978
- Academic staff: 182 FTE Tutors
- Students: 7,835 students or 3,221 EFTS
- Location: Northland Region, New Zealand
- Campus: Whangārei, Kaikohe, Kaitaia, Kerikeri, Dargaville
- Website: www.northtec.ac.nz

NorthTec (Tai Tokerau Wānanga) is a tertiary education provider in northern New Zealand, with its main campus in Raumanga, Whangārei. NorthTec provides programmes ranging from foundation, certificate, diploma and degree levels. The degrees are nationally monitored and so can lead to postgraduate study at universities and other organisations. NorthTec works closely with local and national industries.

== History ==
NorthTec was founded as Northland Community College. This opened with its own campus in Raumanga Valley, Whangārei, on 1 April 1978. As such, its mission was largely to offer trade and community education. The first chief executive officer was Noel Harrison.

The college grew rapidly and became instrumental in supplying Refining NZ at nearby Marsden Point, with skilled workers. By 1981, it offered more than 50 courses. In 1983, the college commenced the phased take-over of nurse training from Northland Base Hospital.

By the mid-1980s, competing private bodies were offering trade and community courses in Northland. This was one factor that led the college to change its product offering to include higher and sometimes more academic tuition. As part of this process, it became a polytechnic in 1988 and took the name Northland Polytechnic for the next 17 years. Later in 1988, it was offering degrees and diplomas of a competitive standard.

Along with a wide range of Certificates and Diplomas, NorthTec currently offers seven bachelor's degrees. Five of these are run solely by NorthTec. These include the Bachelor of Applied Management, Bachelor of Applied Information Systems, Bachelor of Nursing, Bachelor of Applied Social Work, and Maunga Kura Toi - Bachelor of Māori Art. One, the Bachelor of Sport and Recreation, is run by the Auckland University of Technology and able to be completed through NorthTec. The last, the bachelor of Applied Science (Biodiversity Management), is a Unitec Institute of Technology degree able to be completed through NorthTec.

The university has staff with high academic qualifications, including several with masters’ and doctors’ degrees. NorthTec is governed by a Council, which supports the Chief Executive.

On 1 April 2020, NorthTec became a subsidiary of Te Pūkenga alongside the 15 other Institutes of Technology and Polytechnics (ITPs).

In mid-July 2025, the Vocational Education Minister Penny Simmonds announced that NorthTec along with the Western Institute of Technology at Taranaki (WITT), Whitireia New Zealand, the Wellington Institute of Technology (WelTEC) and Tai Poutini Polytechnic (TPP) would temporarily remain with Te Pūkenga until final decisions were made in early 2026. On 1 January 2026, it was confirmed that NorthTec would remain part of Te Pukenga until 1 January 2027.

== Locations ==
NorthTec has campuses and learning centres across Northland. The main campus is located in Whangārei. In addition, NorthTec has campuses and learning centres in Dargaville, Kaikohe, Kaitaia and the Rodney District.

=== Whangārei ===
NorthTec's main campus is located in Raumanga Valley Road, Whangārei. The Raumanga campus is set in park-like grounds and its facilities include:

- Library
- Health Centre
- Student Cafe
- The Apprentice Restaurant – a hospitality training restaurant that is open to the public
- Hair and Beauty Salon – a training salon that is open to the public
- Geoff Wilson Art Gallery

Programmes are also taught at locations across Whangārei, including Future Trades, ASB Stadium.

=== Dargaville ===
NorthTec Dargaville has a focus on trades and land-based training. Areas of study include: Agriculture, Construction, Forestry, Horticulture and Hospitality.

=== Kaikohe ===
NorthTec Kaikohe campus opened on a new site on Monday, 19 September 2016. Areas of study include: Agriculture, Automotive Engineering, Business, Construction, Forestry, Horticulture, Social Services and Te Reo.

=== Kaitaia ===
NorthTec's northernmost campus is located on Oxford Street in Kaitaia. The Kaitaia Learning Centre offers courses ranging from horticulture to business and construction to social services. The campus comprises classrooms, an on-site administration building, a computer suite and two large workshops for the practical delivery of trades programmes.

=== Kerikeri ===
NorthTec's Bay of Islands campus, Te Pou o Manako, on Hone Heke Road, Kerikeri reopened in 2018 in partnership with local hapū, Ngāti Rēhia, after being closed in December 2017. In March 2022 NorthTec and Ngāti Rēhia took a step forward in their partnership with the signing of a new agreement. Under the agreement, Ngāti Rēhia will take on responsibility for managing Te Pou o Manako, NorthTec's Kerikeri campus. Kipa Munro of Ngāti Rēhia will take on the role of Kaiwhakahaere Mātua, Campus Operations Manager. The new agreement takes the partnership into an operational mode with the aim of meeting the needs of whānau, hapū and the local community through programme delivery.

=== Rawene ===
The Rawene Learning Centre closed in December 2017. The campus remains open to community groups and is located on Nimmo Street, in the small historic town of Rawene.

=== Auckland ===
The Auckland campus caters primarily for international students is located in Queen Street, Auckland.

== Programmes ==
NorthTec provides over 90 courses across a range of levels: Bachelor's degrees, Diplomas, Certificates and Graduate diplomas. Subject areas taught include:

- Agriculture
- Applied Writing
- Architecture
- Arts
- Beauty & Hairdressing
- Business
- Business Admin & Computing
- Construction
- E-Learning
- Engineering (Civil & trades)
- Environmental Studies
- English Language
- Forestry
- Foundation studies
- Health & Safety
- Horticulture
- Maori Arts
- Nursing
- Road Transport
- Social Services
- Sport & Recreation
- Te Reo
- Tertiary Teaching
- Tourism & Travel

== NorthTec's students ==
During 2020, NorthTec provided education to 5,876 students. 46% of the student body identifies as Māori. Māori culture is thus an integral part of NorthTec's activities. This is reflected in part by the presence of the Te Puna o Te Matauranga Marae (Māori meeting house) complex on the Whangārei campus. Morning karakai is also conducted at the marae for staff and students each week day, although this has shifted to an online mode via zoom during the recent COVID-19 pandemic.

International students from China, Japan, India, the US, North Africa and other countries take advantage of the English language, hospitality, business, nursing and other quality courses on offer at NorthTec. As most of these students do not have English as a first language and are not used to the local culture, NorthTec has an active International Office to assist. This offers tuition in English and peer mentors who either are familiar with the cultures of East Asia or, where possible, senior students of similar cultural backgrounds.

Some 40% of the student body attend classes at the main campus located in Whangārei, about 160 km north of Auckland. The remainder attend the regional campuses listed above.

== Notable alumni ==
- Keith Paroa Curry (born 1963 or 1964) – first male Plunket nurse
- Davina Duke (born 1975) – ceramics artist
