= Reweti Arapere =

New Zealand illustrator, sculptor and painter

Reweti Arapare
- Born: 1984 (age 41–42); Tauranga, New Zealand
- Education: Toioho ki Āpiti, Massey University
- Known for: Painting, Illustration, Sculpture

Reweti Arapare (born 1984) is a New Zealand illustrator, sculptor and painter.

Arapare was born in Tauranga in 1984. Of Māori descent, Arapare affiliates to Ngāti Raukawa ki te Tonga, Ngāti Porou, and Ngāti Tūwharetoa. He studied at Toioho ki Āpiti, Massey University's school of Māori visual arts, and graduated with a masters in 2009. After graduating he was awarded a residency at Queen Elizabeth College by the Ministry of Education.

His first solo exhibition was Te Poho o Reweti at Bowen Gallery in Wellington. This was followed by a second solo exhibition in 2013 entitled Rakau Matarau at Enjoy Gallery. He was one of seven contemporary artists included in the exhibition Tākiri: An Unfurling at the New Zealand Maritime Museum from 2019 to 2020. This work was part of the Tuia 250 commemoration and received funding from the New Zealand Lottery Grants Board Te Puna Tahua.

His work was also included in Toi Tū Toi Ora, at Auckland Art Gallery. This was the largest exhibition of Māori artists held at the gallery since 1989.

Influences on his art have been te reo and Te Ao Māori and his experiences growing up bilingual, which is reflected in the naming of his pieces, and graffiti artists. He cites artists that have shaped his art as Shane Cotton, Lyonel Grant and Rangi Kipa.

Arapere has exhibited at Bowen Gallery, City Gallery Wellington, Enjoy Gallery, Expressions Whirinaki, New Zealand Maritime Museum, Pataka Gallery and Auckland Art Gallery.
