= Star Gossage =

New Zealand artist

- Born: 1973 (age 52–53); Ōtorohanga, New Zealand
- Education: Otago Polytechnic School of Art
- Movement: Expressionism; impressionism; surrealism
- Parent(s): Tilly and Peter Gossage
- Awards: Arts Foundation New Generation Award (2014)

Star Fleur Gossage (born 1973) is a New Zealand painter. In addition to painting, her practice includes theatre, film-making, poetry, and sculpture. While referencing European movements such as expressionism, impressionism and surrealism, her work incorporates Māori concepts such as whānau and whakapapa.

== Life ==
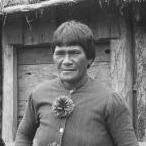
Her ancestor Rāhui Te Kiri was evicted by the government from Little Barrier Island in 1896

Gossage is of Ngāti Manuhiri, Ngātiwai, Ngāti Ruanui, French, English and Portuguese descent; the great-great-granddaughter of Rāhui Te Kiri, and daughter of the artists Tilly and Peter Gossage. Her Māori heritage is core to her work and following her graduation in 1995 she returned to her ancestral home in Pākiri, north of Auckland, to establish her current home and studio. Her ancestral land is an inspiration for her artwork.

== Education ==
In 1995, Gossage received a Diploma of Fine Arts from Otago Polytechnic School of Art. During her studies, she experimented with a wide variety of media including film and theatre production (including play-writing) and was inspired by, and worked with, other innovative young Māori art students.

== Exhibitions and collections ==
Gossage received critical acclaim for her 2014 exhibition Five Maori Painters at Auckland Art Gallery Toi o Tamaki, exhibiting alongside Robyn Kahukiwa, Kura Te Waru Rewiri, Emily Karaka, and Saffronn Te Ratana. With regular exhibitions in New Zealand and throughout the world, her work is held several collections including at Auckland Art Gallery Toi o Tāmaki, Te Papa Tongarewa Museum of New Zealand, Ministry of Foreign Affairs and Trade, The Arts House Trust, and the University of Auckland. She is "recognised as one of the most important Māori artists of her generation".

A survey exhibition of her work spanning 20 years titled He Tangata The People opened at the New Zealand Portrait Gallery Te Pūkenga Whakaata in 2020 and has been presented at the Sarjeant Gallery Te Whare o Rehua (2021), Pah Homestead (2021/2022), and the Waikato Museum (2022).

Another survey exhibition was held at Pātaka Art + Museum in Porirua, Kia tau te Rangimārie – Let Peace be Among Us (24 July – 30 October 2022). Pātaka describes her art work: "She paints enigmatic figures in shifting landscapes that explore emotion and memory, journeys of loss and endurance, and relationships with immediate whānau and tūpuna."

== Awards and residencies ==
In 2014 Gossage won the Arts Foundation's New Generation Award and was nominated for the Singapore Signature Art Prize from Singapore Art Museum. Gossage participated in the Mana Moana residency in Honolulu, Hawaii in 2016, part of a cultural exchange between Hawaii and New Zealand, and supported through the Creative New Zealand International Indigenous Artform Exchange.
