= Ayesha Green =

New Zealand artist

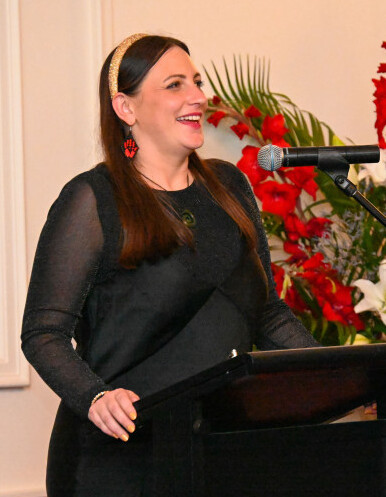
- Green in 2024
- Born: 1987 (age 38–39); Christchurch, New Zealand
- Education: Elam School of Fine Arts (MFA, 2013)
- Awards: National Contemporary Art Award (2019); Arts Foundation of New Zealand Te Tumu Toi Springboard Award (2020)

Ayesha Melody Green (born 1987) is a painter and artist from New Zealand. Her works are inspired by her Māori heritage and often use the kōkōwai pigment.

== Early life and education ==
Green was born in 1987 in Christchurch, New Zealand. She is of Kāi Tahu and Ngāti Kahungunu tribal descent. She originally intended to be a filmmaker and completed a bachelor's degree in media arts at Wintec. After developing an interest in painting, she completed a masters of fine arts at the Elam School of Fine Arts in 2013 followed by a graduate diploma in museums and cultural heritage.

== Career ==
In 2019 she won the National Contemporary Arts Award for her painting Nana's Birthday. These awards are run by the Waikato Museum Te Whare Taonga o Waikato. The judge was Fiona Pardington and there were 52 finalists from 300 entries.

Green was awarded an Arts Foundation Springboard award in 2020. As part of this award she was mentored by Suzanne Ellison of Kāti Huirapa Rūnaka ki Puketeraki.

In 2020 her sculpture, Ko te Tūhono, was selected by the Dunedin City Council to feature as public art in the Octagon, the city centre. Installation was completed in December 2021; Mayor Aaron Hawkins said its unveiling marked "a cultural maturing of our city".

In November 2021, her diptych painting All of my Lovers are Immigrants (Smooth my Pillow) sold for NZ$48,000 at auction; she had sold it the year before for $19,000.

== Exhibitions ==
- 2019: Elizabeth The First, Jhana Millers Gallery
- 2020: He Tohu, Group Exhibition, Jhana Millers Gallery
- 2020: Wrapped Up in Clouds, Dunedin Public Art Gallery
- 2021: The Right Place?, Jhana Millers Gallery
- 2021: Good Citizen, Jhana Millers Gallery
- 2022: Folk Nationalism, Tauranga Art Gallery
- 2022: Screaming Waterfall, Jhana Millers Gallery
- 2022/23: Still Life, Te Uru Waitakere Contemporary Gallery
