= Darcy Nicholas =

New Zealand artist, writer and art administrator (born 1945)

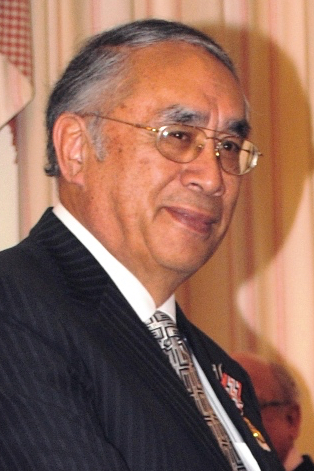
Nicholas in 2010

Darcy John Nicholas QSO (born 1945) is a New Zealand artist, writer and art administrator.

== Art administration career ==
Nicholas opened his own art gallery in Lower Hutt in 1975. In 1981 he became director of the Wellington Arts Centre. He was appointed director of the Central Regional Arts Council in 1986 and in 1989 was appointed Assistant General Manager with the Iwi Transition Agency.

Nicholas led the development of the Pataka Art + Museum complex in Porirua, which opened in 1998. He stepped down from his role as Pataka's director and Porirua City Council's community services general manager in 2012.

Nicholas also established the Māori Art Market art fair in 2005 and has remained involved in the creative leadership of the event.

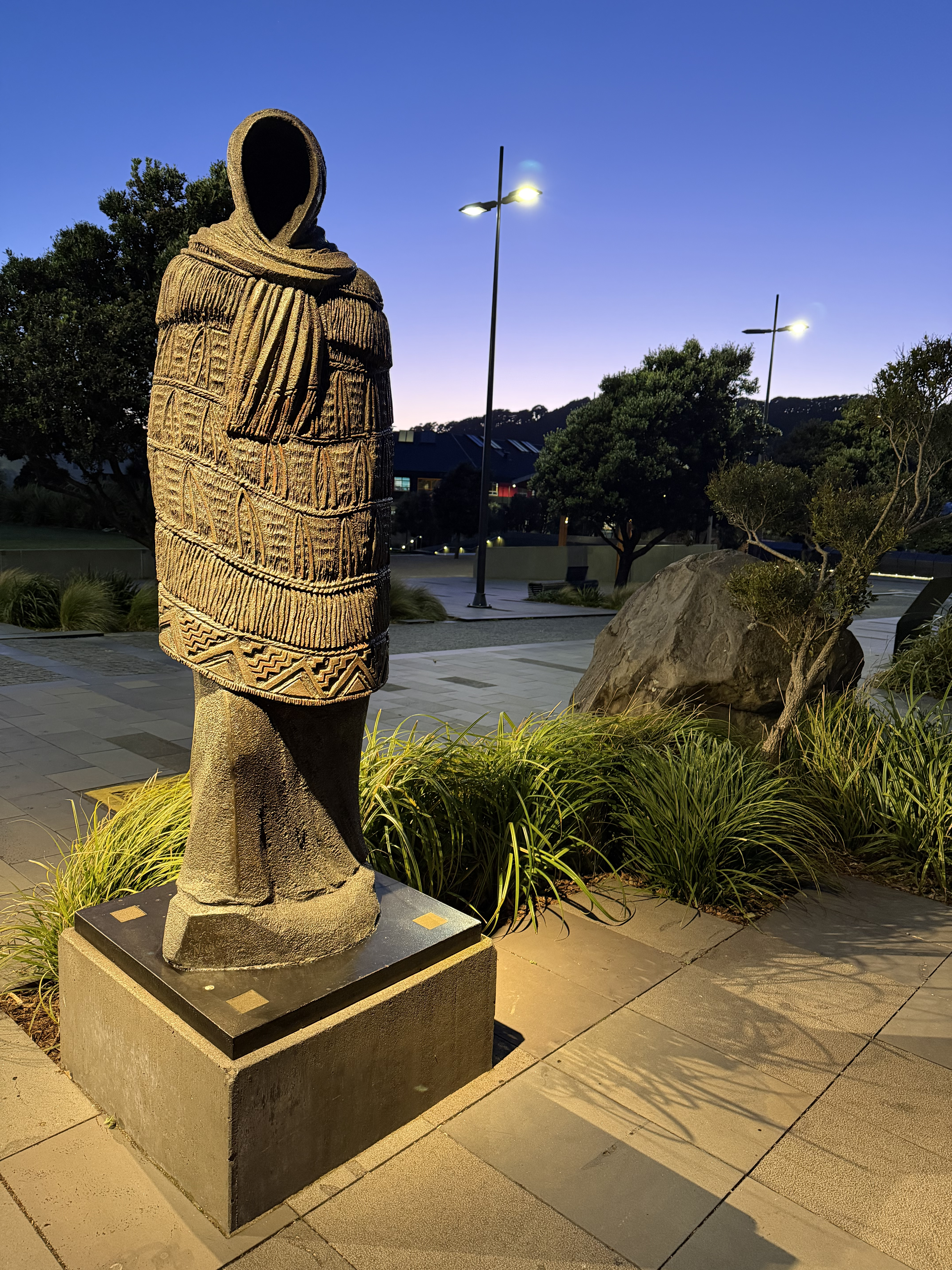
'Hinerangi' at the Pukeahu National War Memorial Park in Wellington

== Artistic practice ==
Nicholas has been involved in the contemporary Māori art movement since the late 1960s. Nicholas spent 10 years with the New Zealand Police early in his career, but painted and exhibited during this time. In 1973 he decided to move into making art full-time. He has exhibited throughout New Zealand, Australia, Africa, United States, France, India, Britain, Germany, Netherlands, and Canada.

Nicholas was commissioned to produce the sculpture Hinerangi for the opening of Pukeahu National War Memorial Park in 2015.

== Awards and recognitions ==
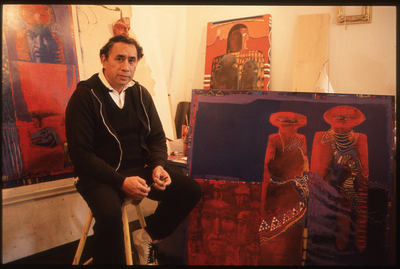
Darcy Nicholas in his studio, 1993

- 1984 Fulbright Scholarship to observe contemporary Native American and African America art in the United States
- Queens Service Order for services to museums in the 2010 Queen's Birthday Honours
- 2013 Supreme Te Waka Toi award, Creative New Zealand
- 2026 Arts Foundation of New Zealand Icon Award

== Personal life ==
Nicholas was born in Waitara in 1945. He lives in Stokes Valley, Lower Hutt. Nicholas is of Māori (Te Āti Awa, Ngāi Te Rangi, Taranaki, Ngāti Ruanui, Ngāti Hauā, Tauranga Moana) and European descent.
