= Ngahuia Harrison =

Ngahuia Harrison (born 11 February 1988) is a New Zealand Māori (Ngāti Wai, Ngāpuhi) photographer.

== Education ==
Harrison completed her Master of Fine Arts degree at Elam School of Fine Arts in 2012. She is a doctoral student at Elam and the James Henare Māori Research Centre, University of Auckland. As part of her doctoral research she is exploring the effects of the Marine and Coastal Area (Takutai Moana) Act 2011 upon her iwi (tribe), Ngāti Wai.

== Work ==
Harrison works with a 35 mm camera and other lens-based media. Her images express narratives of her hapū (family group) related to wai (bodies of water).

In late 2023 through early 2024, Harrion's work, Coastal Cannibals, was exhibited at City Gallery Wellington Te Whare Toi.

Her work is held in the Christchurch Art Gallery and the Auckland Art Gallery.
