= Baye Riddell =

New Zealand potter, musician (born 1950)

Riddell in 2026

Baye Michael Riddell ONZM (born 1950), also known as Baye Pewhairangi Riddell, is a New Zealand ceramicist, composer and musician of Ngāti Porou and Te Whānau-a-Ruataupare descent.

Riddell was born in Tokomaru Bay in 1950 and began working with clay in the early 1970s, while living in Christchurch. His early work fits within the contemporary movement in New Zealand craft pottery, largely influenced by the Anglo-Orientalism of Bernard Leach and Japanese potters who were influential in New Zealand, such as Shoji Hamada. Riddell, who had become distant from his Māori heritage, started putting Māori motifs on his pots, and in 1974 he became a full-time potter, the first Māori artist to commit to this profession.

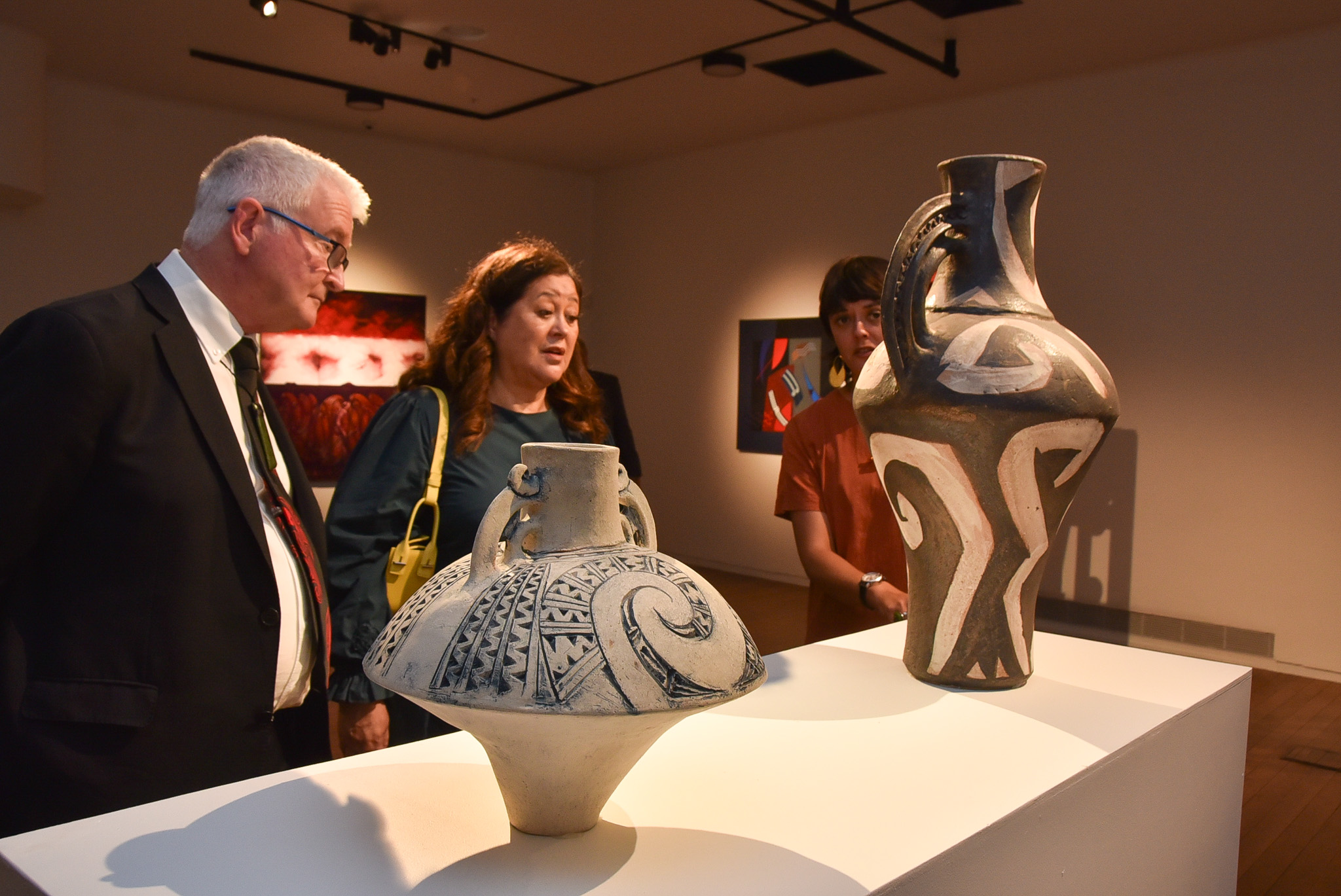
The governor-general, Dame Cindy Kiro, and Richard Davies view two pots by Riddell at the Wairau Māori Art Gallery in Whangārei on 25 March 2025

Riddell built his first kiln in Christchurch at this time, but soon moved back to the North Island, living in Central Hawkes Bay and Anaura Bay before settling in Tokomaru Bay in 1979. Here he sold work through a cooperative founded by Helen Mason, who introduced him to other potters, including Barry Brickell, Harry Davis and George Kojis as well as the artist Theo Schoon. Through his aunt, Ngoi Pēwhairangi, who was working to revive traditional Māori art and culture, Riddell also reconnected with his own heritage.

Through the resurgent contemporary Māori art movement at this time Riddell connected with other Māori clay artists, including Colleen Waata Urlich and Manos Nathan and spent time working alongside them at workshops and hui (meetings). In 1986, with Manos Nathan, Riddell was a co-founder of Ngā Kaihanga Uku, the national Māori clayworkers’ organisation in Aotearoa New Zealand.

In 1989 he and Nathan were awarded a Fulbright Scholarship to establish an exchange with Native American artists. In 2011 he was awarded the Creative New Zealand Craft/Object Fellowship.

In the 2026 King’s Birthday Honours, Riddell was appointed an Officer of the New Zealand Order of Merit, for services to Mãori clay art.
