= Saffronn Te Ratana =

New Zealand artist (born 1975)

- Born: 1975 (age 50–51)
- Education: Māori Visual Arts programme Toioho Ki Apiti at Te Pūtahi-a-Toi, School of Māori Studies, Massey University
- Notable work: Ka kata te po (2011), Tu te manu ora i te Rangi (2008)
- Partner: Ngataiharuru Taepa

Saffronn Te Ratana (born 1975) is a New Zealand visual artist in Palmerston North.

Her mixed media work PW 1 (Tiki remix) is included in Te Papa's collections. As part of the 2013 Auckland Triennial, her work was acquired by the Auckland Art Gallery.

== Education ==
Te Ratana went to Palmerston Intermediate Normal School, followed by Palmerston North Girls’ High School. Te Ratana graduated from the Māori visual arts programme, Toioho Ki Apiti, at Te Pūtahi-a-Toi, School of Māori Studies, Massey University. Following graduation she has remained involved with the university including as a tutor and lecturer in Māori visual arts.

== Career ==
Te Ratana works with mixed media, often creating three-dimensional structures using material such as fabrics, cardboard, wood, and fiberglass. She often works collaboratively with other artists, including creating works with her partner Ngataiharuru Taepa for over ten years. Co-created pieces include Ka kata te po (with Taepa & Hemi Macgregor, shown at the Te Manawa Art Gallery in 2011 then at the 5th Auckland Triennial) and Tu te manu ora i te Rangi (2008).

Considered a leading contemporary Māori artist, her works draw on her heritage and often comments on the suppression of tribal voices. Her work Ka kata te po (2011) is a response to the Urewera Raids of 2007. The piece Tu te manu ora i te Rangi explores Māori cosmology through legends of Tāne, Rehua, Ranginui and Papatūānuku, and the Māori creation myth.

=== Exhibitions ===
While at university, Te Ratana participated in several high-profile group exhibitions including Purangiaho: Seeing Clearly (2001) at the Auckland Art Gallery Toi o Tāmaki and Taiāwhio: Continuity and Change (2002) at the Museum of New Zealand Te Papa Tongarewa.

Te Ratana's first solo exhibition, Pepeha, was at the Suter Art Gallery Te Aratoi o Whakatu in 2009. She exhibited alongside fellow Māori artists in the exhibition Whakarongo at the Tauranga Art Gallery. In 2014, she was part of the exhibition Five Māori Painters alongside Robyn Kahukiwa, Kura Te Waru Rewiri, Emily Karaka, and Star Gossage. Te Ratana's work in this exhibition reflected her experimental style by taking a three-dimensional approach to painting. She has also exhibited at the Thermostat Art Gallery and her work was included in the touring exhibition E Tū Ake: Standing Strong, with the exhibition visiting international venues including Québec, Paris, and Mexico City.

== Personal life ==
Te Ratana is Māori descent, of the Ngāi Tuhoe tribe. She currently lives and works in Palmerston North.
