= Manos Nathan =

New Zealand potter

Manos Ross Nathan (20 December 1948 – 2 September 2015) was a New Zealand ceramicist.

Born in Rawene, Hokianga, to Eruera and Katina (née Toraki) Nathan, he was of Māori (Te Roroa, Ngāti Whātua and Ngāpuhi) descent on his father's side and Greek (Cretan) descent on his mother's side.

Nathan was raised in Wekaweka, and subsequently moved to Wellington with his family in 1955. He completed a Diploma of Textile Design at Wellington Polytechnic School of Design in 1968–70.

In 1986, along with Baye Riddell, he founded Ngā Kaihanga Uku, the national Māori clayworkers' organisation in New Zealand. In 1989, he travelled to the United States on a Fulbright Grant to visit Native American potters. A reciprocal visit took place in 1991 and he continued to foster links to indigenous peoples with a clay tradition in the Pacific and in North America. He was a foundation member of Te Atinga, the visual arts committee of Toi Māori Aotearoa.

Nathan exhibited widely around the world and was actively engaged with cultural exchanges with indigenous peoples of Japan, Australia, the Pacific, the United States and Canada. He was awarded many honours during his career. He was inducted into the College of Creative Arts Toi Rauwharangi (Massey University) Hall of Fame in 2010, along with textile designer Avis Higgs.

== Death ==
Nathan died of leukaemia on 2 September 2015; he was survived by his wife, Alison, their four children and one grandchild.

Work by Manos Nathan is held in New Zealand and international collections, including the British Museum, the National Museum of Scotland, the Ethnological Museum of Berlin, the Museum of New Zealand Te Papa Tongarewa and the Dowse Art Museum.
