= Te Manawa, Palmerston North =

Museum in Palmerston North

Coordinates: 40.3579°S 175.6083°E

Te Manawa
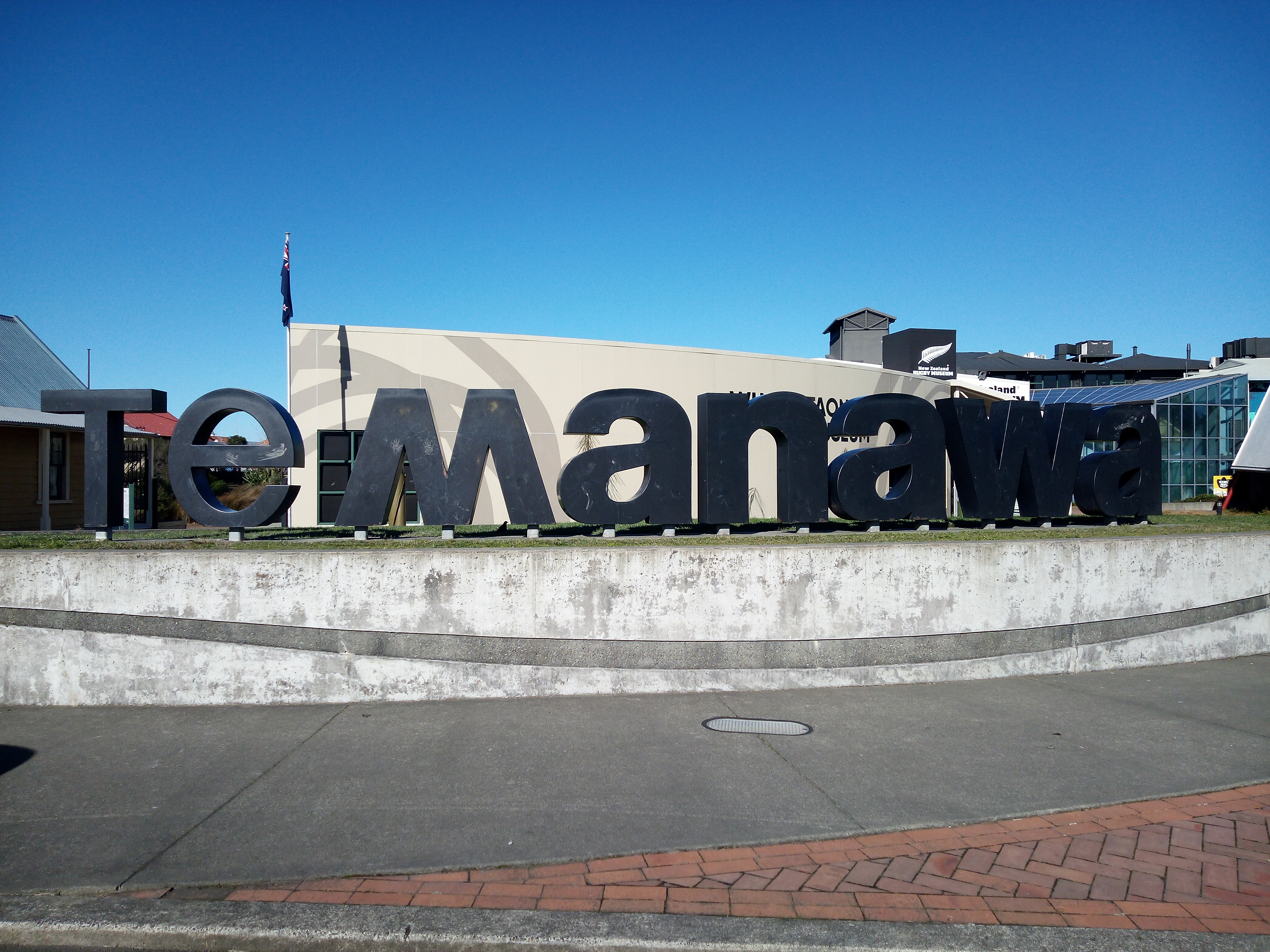

- Location within North Island
- Former name: Manawatu Museum
- Established: 1999
- Location: Palmerston North, New Zealand
- Visitors: Over 100,000 (mid-2019 to mid-2020)
- Website: Official website

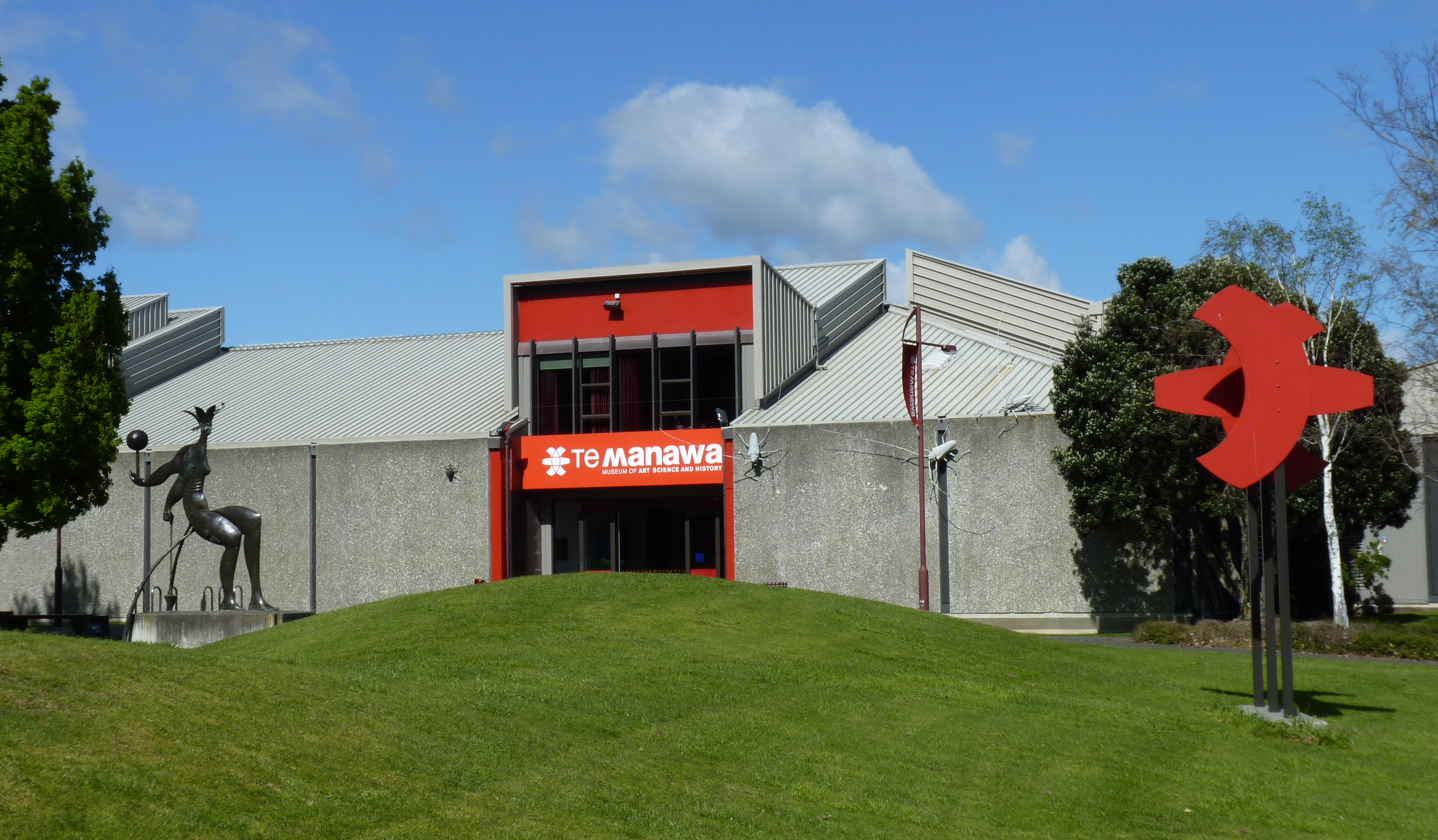
Main entrance to the art gallery of Te Manawa, Main Street. The museum has changed their logo since this photo was taken

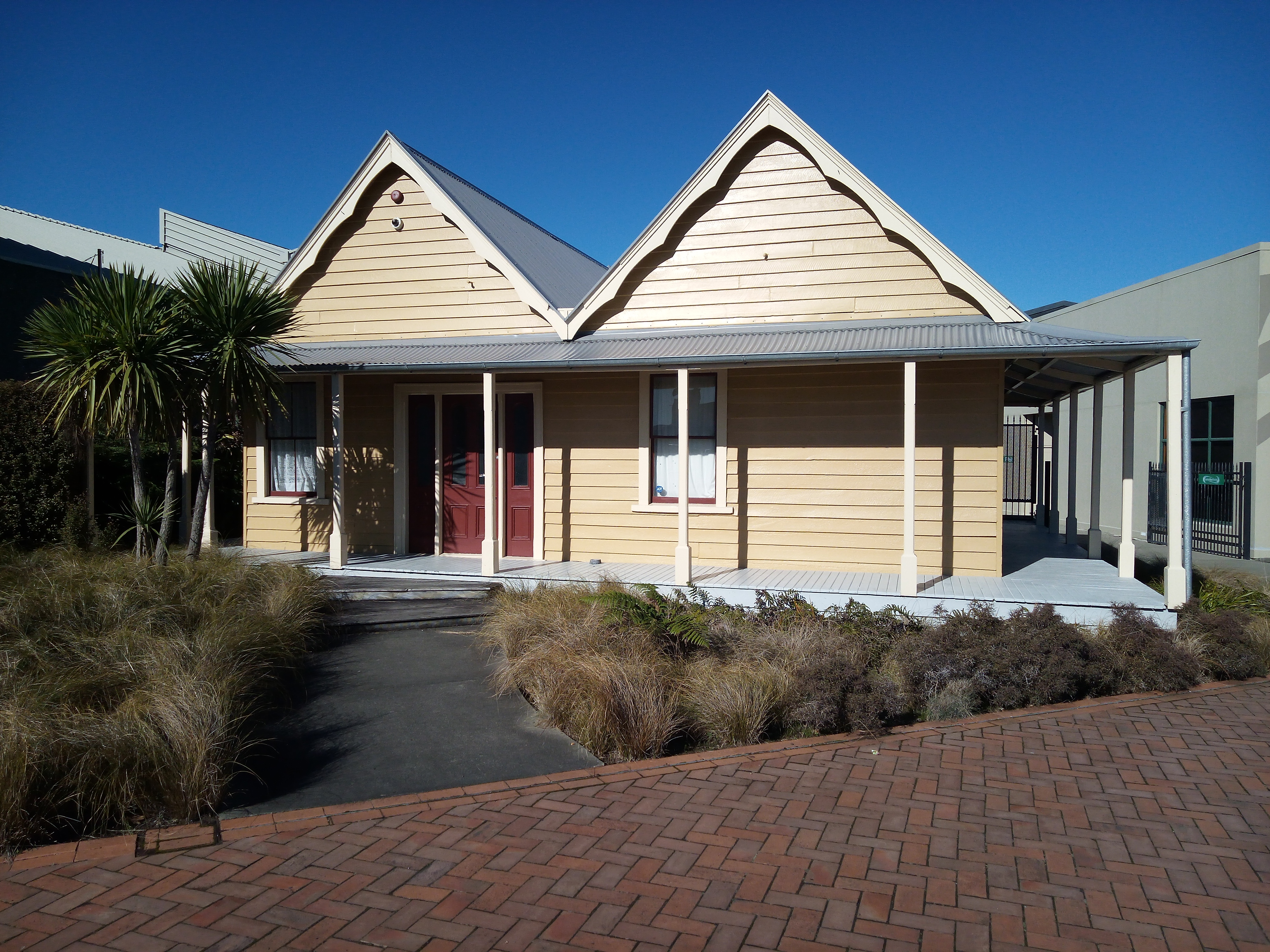
Tōtaranui, a historic pioneer cottage originally built in 1875, now stands in the grounds of Te Manawa.

Te Manawa ('The Heart') is a museum, art gallery and science centre in Palmerston North, New Zealand. It is operated by the Te Manawa Museums Trust, a charitable trust incorporated on 20 August 1999. From that date, the trust assumed responsibility for art works and heritage assets transferred to its care but held on behalf of others. From 1 July 2000 the trust commenced leasing the premises and managing the institution under agreements entered into with the Palmerston North City Council.

The primary objective of the trust is to provide interactive experience in art, science and history through acquiring, conserving, researching, developing, communicating and exhibiting material evidence of people and their environment, rather than making a financial return.

The trust is controlled by Palmerston North City Council and is a Council Controlled Organisation as defined under section 6 of the Local Government Act 2002, by virtue of the council’s right to appoint more than 50% of the board of trustees.

The Te Manawa complex also houses the New Zealand Rugby Museum adjacent to the civic centre, near the Square in Palmerston North, on land which was historically the railway station, before the trains were moved from the center of city to the west of the city. Some dozens of the holdings are contributed to NZMuseums, the combined catalog of museums across New Zealand.

Te Manawa's public spaces include semi-permanent exhibitions, local exhibitions, touring exhibitions, events and a shop. The grounds include a historic pioneer cottage, Tōtaranui, which is one of the oldest extant buildings in Palmerston North. Te Manawa is highly ranked as a tourist attraction by both Trip Advisor and Lonely Planet. It was a finalist in the 2012 New Zealand museum awards.

== Now and then ==
A Te Manawa-curated photography exhibition called Now and then toured municipal art galleries around the country, including Te Manawa, Tauranga (where it raised obscenity concerns), Wairarapa, and Hastings.
