= Pātaka Art + Museum =

Art gallery in Porirua City, New Zealand

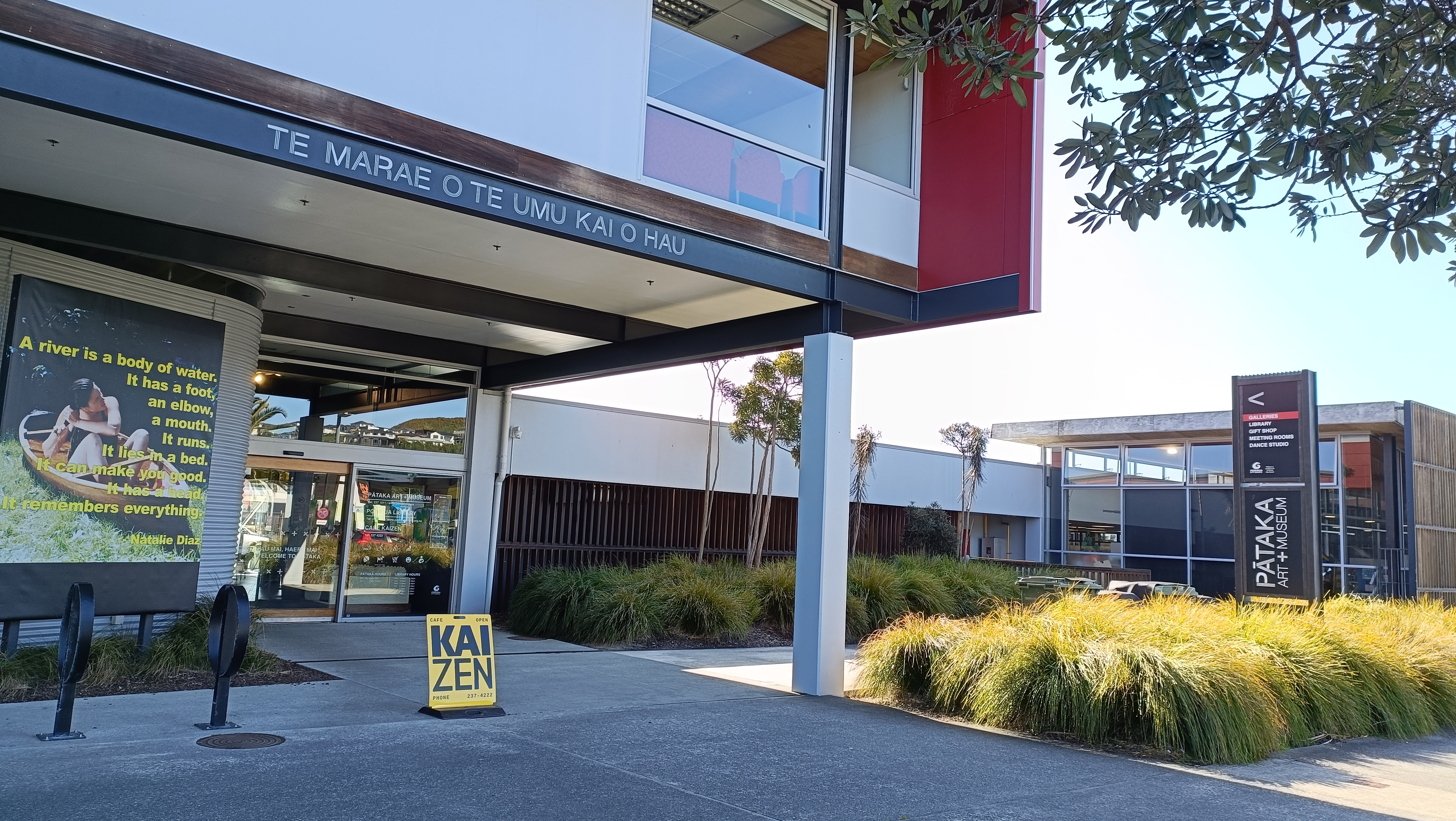
- Established: 1980
- Coordinates: 41.13164°S 174.83961°E
- Type: Art gallery
- Website: pataka.org.nz

Pātaka Museum of Arts and Cultures, often stylised as Pātaka Art + Museum, is a municipal museum and art gallery in Porirua City, New Zealand. Te Marae o Te Umu Kai o Hau is the name of the building where Pātaka is located and opened in 1998. It also houses the Porirua City Library, a privately run cafe and a Japanese garden.

== History ==
In 1980 the Porirua Museum opened and by 1997 had outgrown its Takapūwāhia site. At the same time, the Mana Community Arts Council wished to expand their community art gallery located on the corner of Parumoana and Norrie Streets. The two organisations amalgamated moving into the newly renovated and expanded site in 1998.

Bob Cater co-founded Page 90 which became Pātaka and was awarded the Queen's Service Medal, and Darcy Nicholas was appointed a Companion of the Queen's Service Order, in part for their roles in establishing the museum. The name Pātaka is a Māori language word meaning 'storehouse'. The purpose of Pātaka is to show contemporary Māori and Pacific arts. It also shows other New Zealand arts.

== Facilities ==
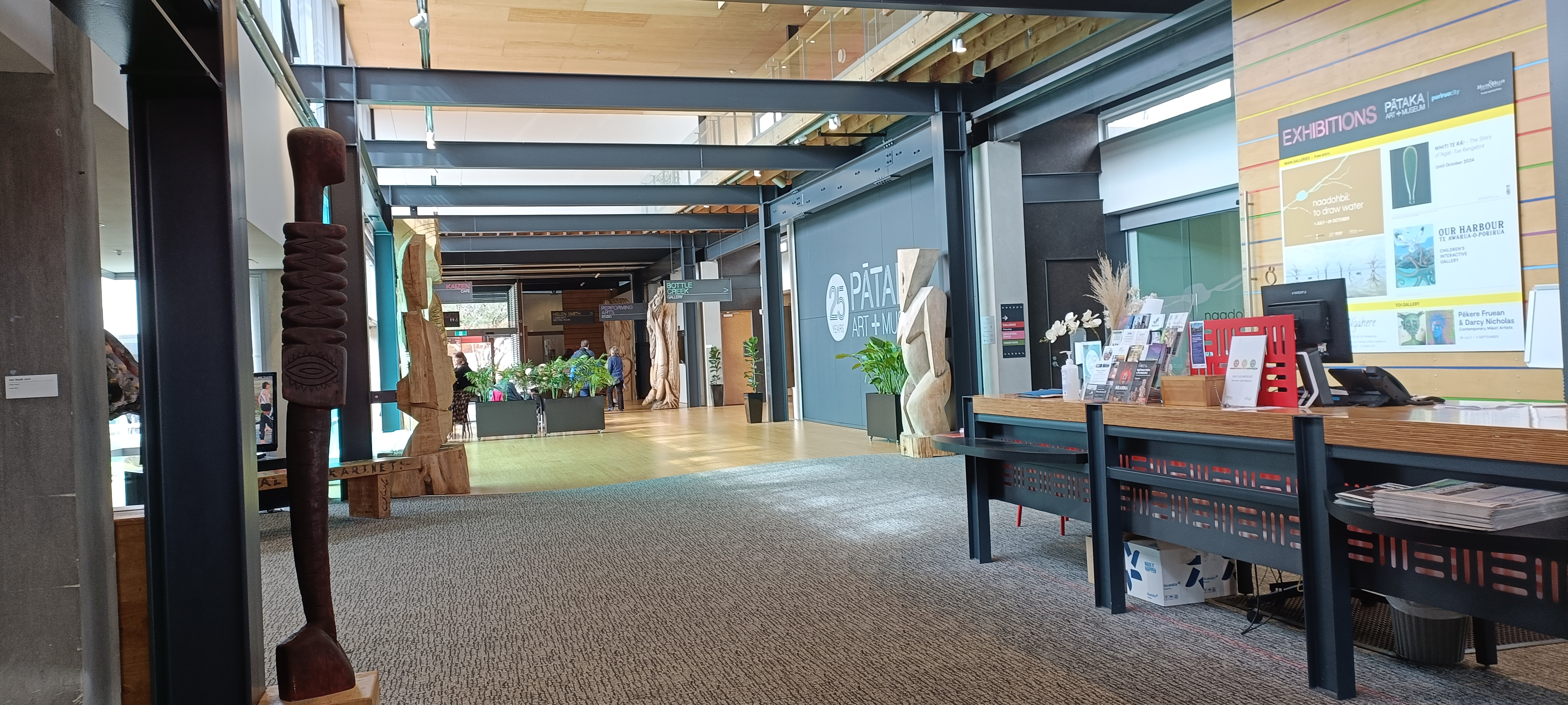
Foyer

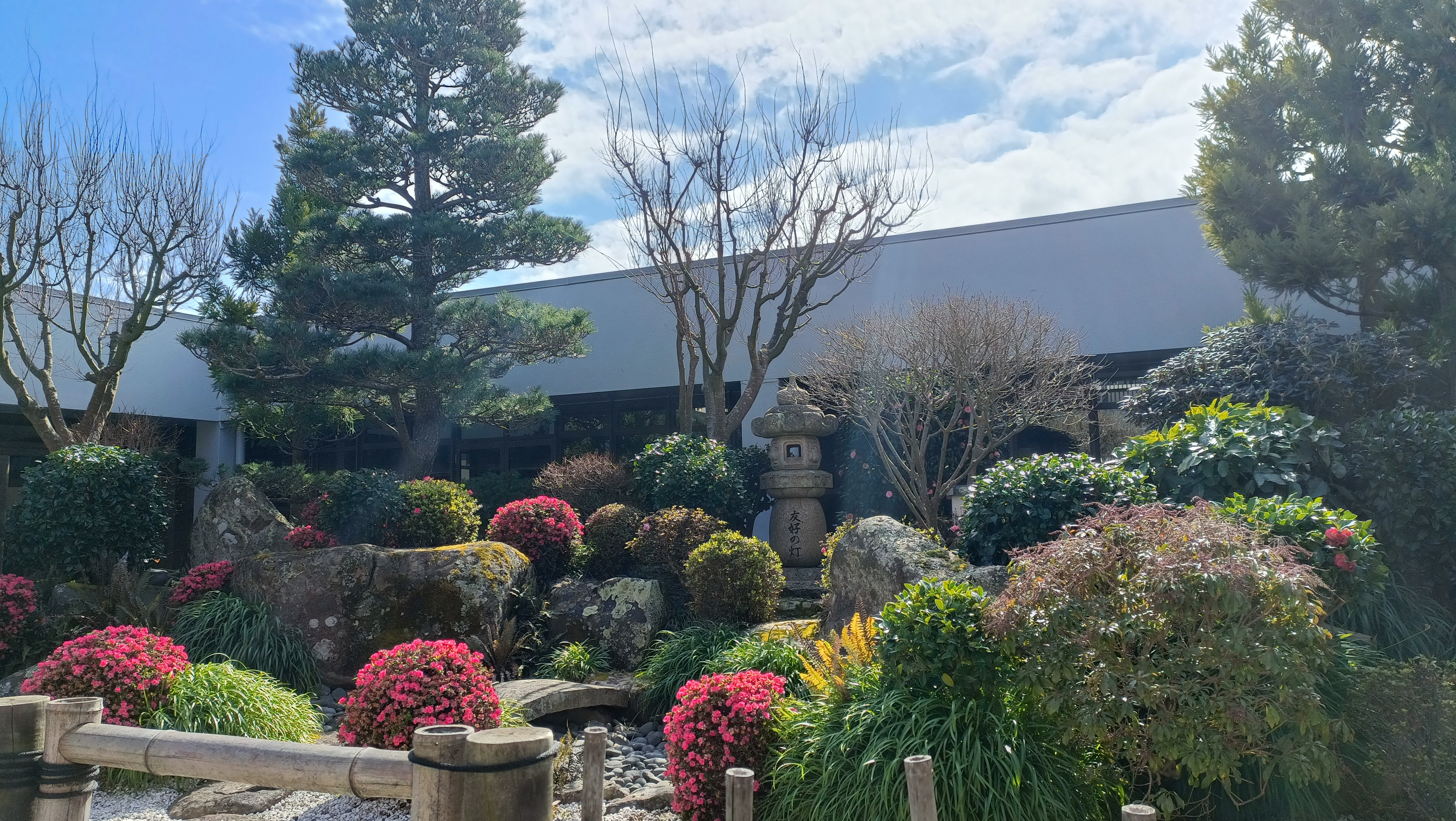
Japanese garden at Pātaka

Architecture + was the architectural firm that designed Pātaka. They transformed a 1970s office building that already housed the Porirua City Library, Whitireia's performance space and Page 90 gallery.

Pātaka has galleries with changing exhibitions. The Bottle Creek Gallery is for community and local artists. Other galleries are the Front Gallery, West Gallery, the Maude & Miller Gallery and the Daylight Gallery. The Daylight Gallery has a semi-permanent exhibition about Ngāti Toa Rangatira, the local Māori iwi (nation or tribe) called Whiti Te Rā!

Pātaka Art + Museum has an atrium the full length of the building that also connects the Porirua Library, reception, shop, cafē, performing arts studio, and meeting and events rooms and an outside courtyard with a Japanese garden.

== Awards ==
Pātaka has won a number of awards:

- NZIA Resene Branch Award 1999
- Dulux Colour Award 1999
- Carter Holt Harvey award commendation 1999
- Victoria University of Wellington School of Architecture 25th Anniversary Alumni Supreme Award & Educational, Cultural and Community Award
- NZIA Resene Regional Award 2000
