= New Zealand art =

Arts originating from New Zealand

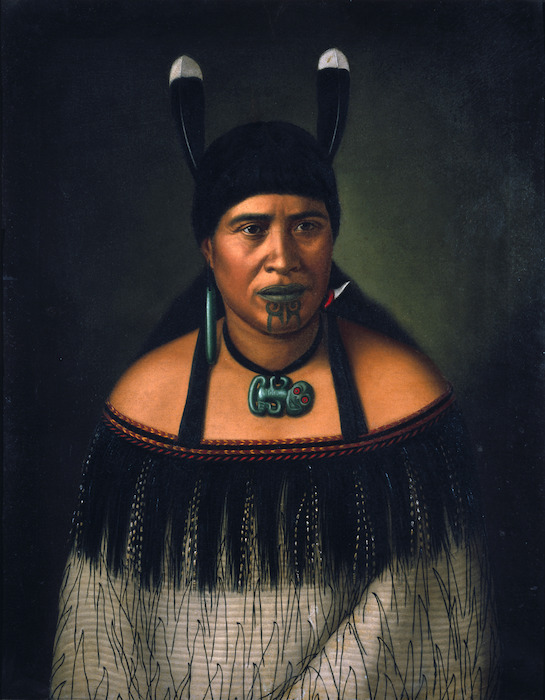
Portrait of Hinepare of Ngāti Kahungunu (1890) by Gottfried Lindauer, showing chin moko, pounamu hei-tiki and woven cloak

New Zealand art consists of the visual and plastic arts (including woodwork, textiles, and ceramics) originating from New Zealand and comes from different traditions: indigenous Māori art and that brought here including from early British and sometimes Irish settlers.

Visual artwork as defined in New Zealand includes paintings, drawings, carvings, printing such as lithographs and woodcuts, and prints (including books of prints). It also includes photographs, sculptures, collages, models and works of art in the form of crafts, ceramics, glassware, jewellery, textiles, weaving, metalware, furniture, and computer and electronic art, from European, Māori and Pacific artists.

== Prehistoric art ==
Charcoal drawings can be found on limestone rock shelters in the centre of the South Island, with over 500 sites in the South Island stretching from Kaikōura to North Otago including at the Takiroa Rock Art Shelter. The drawings are estimated to be between 500 and 800 years old, and portray animals, humans and legendary creatures, possibly stylised reptiles. Some of the birds pictured are extinct, including moa and Haast's eagles. They were drawn by Māori, but the meanings of the art is unknown. The ink they were drawn with was recorded in the 1920s and included resin and gum from tree's including tarata, and either shark liver oil or weka fat. There are preservation and restoration efforts being made including at 15 limestone caves and overhangs at Ōpihi in South Canterbury. Rock art is also found in the North Island with 140 rock art sites listed with the New Zealand Archaeological Association. Perry Fletchern, historical research consultant expects there believes there are more sites un-discovered on farm land. In general the difference between rock art is that in the North Island there are more carvings and abstract motifs the South Island has more drawings and more figurative forms.

== Traditional Māori art ==
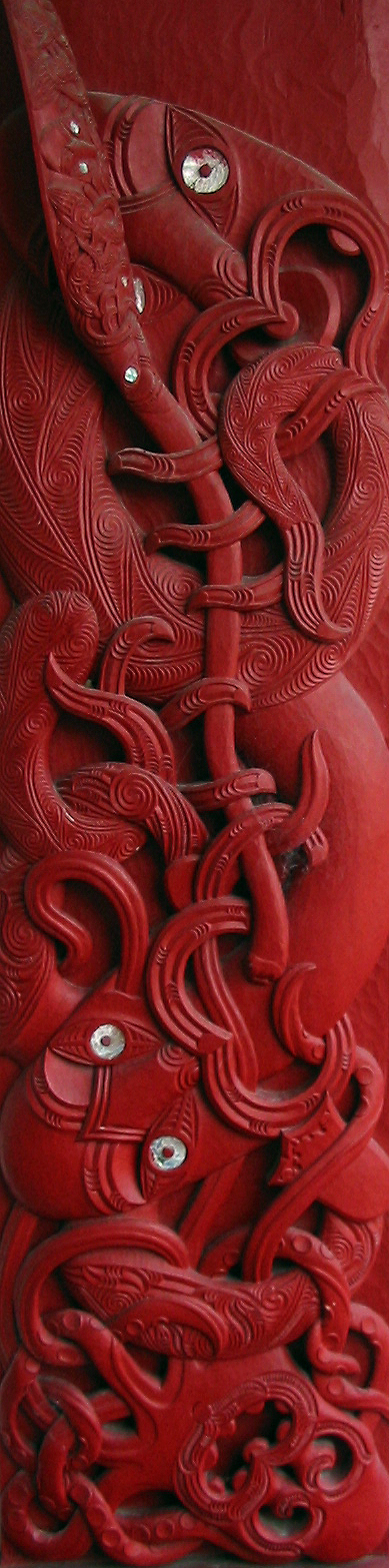
Late twentieth century carved house post depicting the navigator Kupe. Although in an essentially traditional style, this carving was created using metal tools and uses modern paints, creating a form distinct from that of pre-European times.

Māori visual art consists primarily of four forms: carving (whakairo), tattooing (tā moko), weaving (raranga), and painting (kōwhaiwhai). It was rare for any of these to be purely decorative; traditional Māori art was highly spiritual and as an oral society conveyed knowledge or mātauranga including spiritual matters and ancestry. An example is invoking a god or atua by using a specific design on an object can make the item more effective due to the Māori world-view of natural and spiritual worlds being closely connected. Māori art is connected to the art of Moana Oceania Indigenous groups, the peoples of the wider Pacific region. Common across Moana Oceania were whare wānanga, creative hubs of knowledge systems for training specialists (tohunga) including arts specialists. Artistic skills were valued by Māori and leaders were expected to exhibit skills in the arts.

The creation of art was governed by the rules of tapu. Styles varied from region to region: the style now sometimes seen as 'typical' in fact originates from Te Arawa, who maintained a strong continuity in their artistic traditions thanks partly to early engagement with the tourist industry. Most traditional Māori art was highly stylised and featured motifs such as the pātikitiki (flounder/fish), mūmū (checkerboard), poutama (step/staircase pattern), purapura whetū (myriad of stars), the kaokao (chevron), and the koru and kowhaiwhai. These were part of a visual language used by Māori artists to communicate ideas and messages to the viewer.

The first university Māori art history course was taught in 1988 by Ngahuia Te Awekotuku at the University of Auckland. Hirini Moko and Apirana Mahuika have articulated that Māori have for many generations had traditions of art history talking about 'art, its origins, and influences'.

=== Carving ===
Carving was done in three media: wood, bone, and stone. As an oral peoples, for Māori carving recorded genealogy, documented events and preserved traditions and stories. Examples of carved items include buildings, weapons including taiaha, musical instruments (taonga pūoro), special containers (waka huia), boats (waka) and ceremonial staffs used by orators (tokotoko).

Pounamu (greenstone), a form of jade was carved and treasured and other kinds of stone were also used, especially in the North Island. Both stone and bone were used to create jewellery such as the hei-tiki. Large scale stone face carvings were also sometimes created. The introduction of metal tools by Europeans changed some carving styles.

There are many well-known carvers who were men but women also carved. In the early 21st century, Pania Waaka is believed to be the first woman to earn a qualification in Māori carving.

=== Tā moko ===
Tā moko is the art of traditional Māori tattooing, done with a chisel. Men were tattooed on many parts of their bodies, including faces, buttocks and thighs. Women were usually tattooed only on the lips and chin. Moko conveyed a person's ancestry. The art declined in the 19th century following the introduction of Christianity, but in recent decades has undergone a revival. Although modern moko are in traditional styles, most are carried out using modern equipment. Body parts such as the arms, legs and back are popular locations for modern moko, although some are still on the face.

=== Weaving ===
Weaving was used to create numerous things, including wall panels in meeting houses and other important buildings, as well as clothing and bags (kete). While many of these were purely functional, others were true works of art taking hundreds of hours to complete, and often given as gifts to important people. Cloaks in particular could be decorated with feathers and were the mark of an important person. In pre-European times the main medium for weaving was flax, but following the arrival of Europeans cotton, wool and other textiles were also used, especially in clothing. The extinction and endangerment of many New Zealand birds has made the feather cloak a more difficult item to produce. Weaving was primarily done by women.

=== Painting ===
Although the oldest forms of Māori art are rock paintings, in 'classical' Māori art, painting was not an important art form. It was mainly used as a minor decoration in meeting houses, in stylised forms such as the koru. Europeans introduced Māori to their more figurative style of art, and in the 19th century less stylised depictions of people and plants began to appear on the walls of meeting houses in place of traditional carvings and woven panels. The introduction of European paints also allowed traditional painting to flourish, as brighter and more distinct colours could be produced.

== Explorer art ==
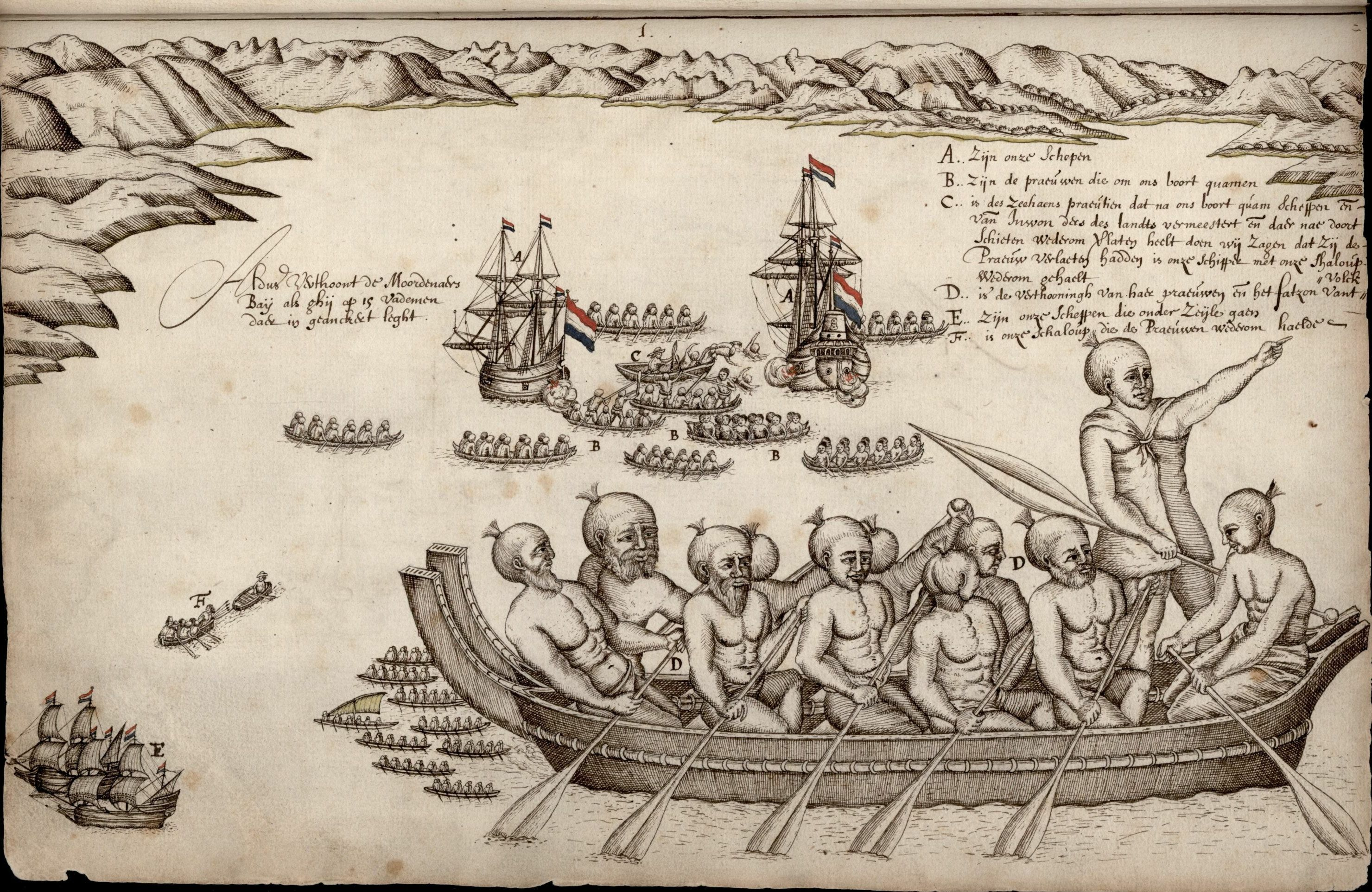
A view of the Murderers' Bay, as you are at anchor here in 15 fathom, Isaac Gilsemans, 1642

Europeans began producing art in New Zealand as soon as they arrived, with many exploration ships including an artist to record newly discovered places, people, flora and fauna. The first European work of art made in New Zealand was a drawing by Isaac Gilsemans, the artist on Abel Tasman's expedition of 1642.

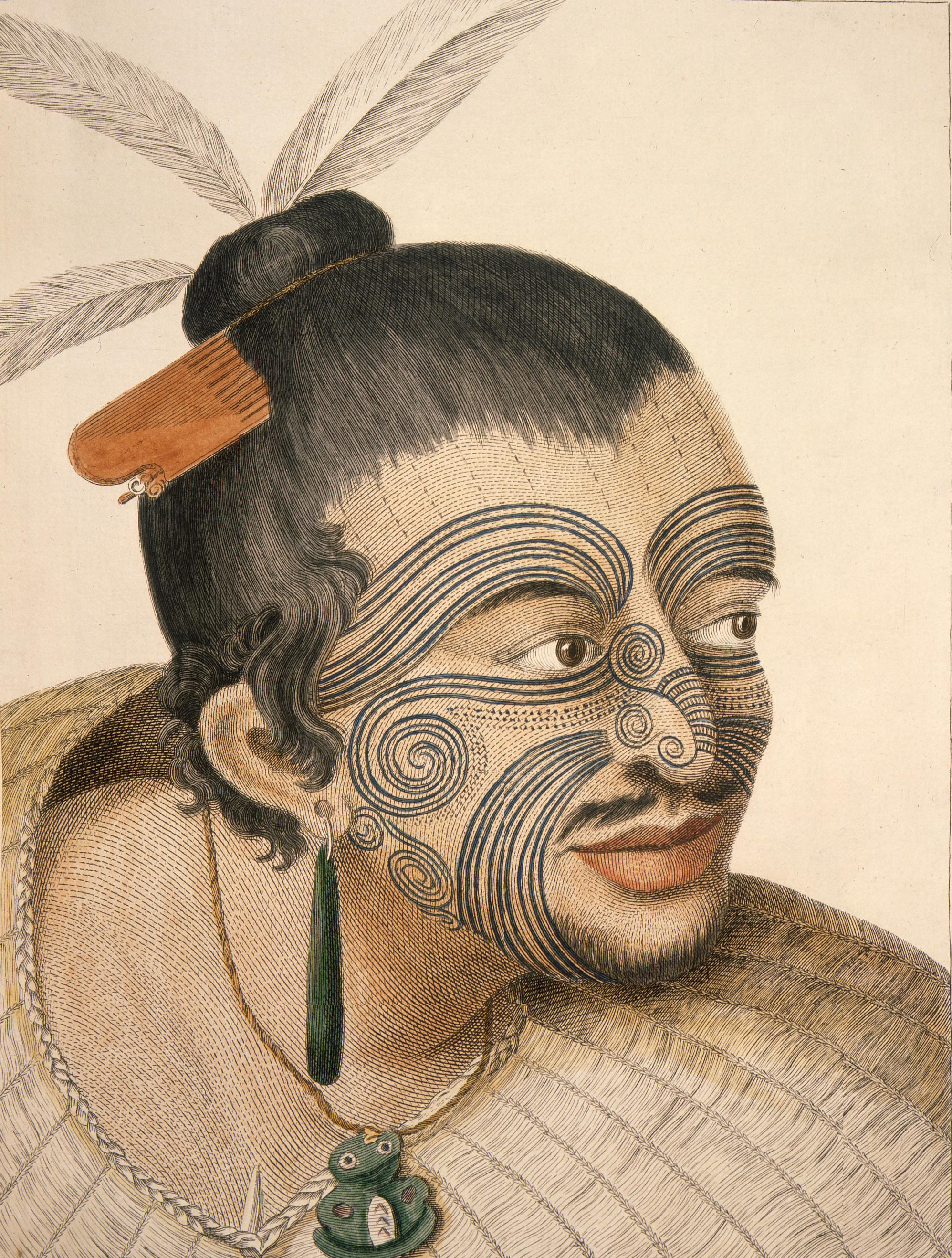
Portrait of a New Zealand man, Sydney Parkinson, 1784, probably from a sketch made in 1769

Joseph Banks and Sydney Parkinson of James Cook's ship Endeavour produced the first detailed depictions of Māori people, New Zealand landscapes, and indigenous flora and fauna in 1769. William Hodges was the artist on HMS Resolution in 1773, and John Webber on HMS Resolution in 1777. Their works captured the imagination of Europeans and were an influence in the 19th century movement of art towards naturalism.

Cook's artists' paintings and descriptions of moko sparked an interest in the subject in Europe, and led to the tattoo becoming a tradition of the British Navy.

== 19th century Pākehā art ==
Early 19th-century artists were for the most part visitors to New Zealand, not residents. Some, such as James Barry, who painted the Ngare Raumati chief Rua in 1818, and Thomas Kendall with the chiefs Hongi Hika and Waikato in 1820, did not visit New Zealand at all, instead painting his subjects when they visited Britain.

Landscape art was popular with early colonisers, and prints were widely used to promote settlement in New Zealand. Notable landscape artists included Augustus Earle, who visited New Zealand in 1827–28, and William Fox, who later became Premier. The first oil portraits of Māori Chiefs with full Tā moko in New Zealand were painted by the portrait artist William Beetham. As colonisation developed a small but derivative art scene began based mostly on landscapes. However the most successful artists of this period, Charles Goldie and Gottfried Lindauer were noted primarily for their portraits of Māori. Most notable Pākehā artists of their period worked in two dimensions; although there was some sculpture this was of limited notability.

Photography in New Zealand also began at this time and, like painting, initially concentrated mostly on landscape and Māori subjects.

== 20th century ==
=== Creation of a distinct Pākehā New Zealand art ===
Beginning in the 1930s, many Pākehā (New Zealanders not of Māori origin, usually of European ancestry) attempted to create a distinctive New Zealand style of art. Many, such as Rita Angus, continued to work on landscapes, with attempts made to depict New Zealand's harsh light. Others appropriate Māori artistic styles; for example Gordon Walters created many paintings and prints based on the koru. New Zealand's most highly regarded 20th-century artist was Colin McCahon, who attempted to use international styles such as cubism in New Zealand contexts. His paintings depicted such things as the Angel Gabriel in the New Zealand countryside. Later works such as the Urewera triptych engaged with the contemporary Māori protest movement.

=== Māori cultural renaissance ===
From the early 20th century, politician Āpirana Ngata fostered a renewal of traditional Māori art forms, for example establishing a school of Māori arts in Rotorua, the New Zealand Māori Arts and Crafts Institute.

=== From the 1960s ===
There was a rise of conceptual art through this period which spread into several independent strands flourishing - performance art, participatory art /community art, body art, Media and Video art, culture jamming, street art, environmental and intervention art. Notable artists included Jim Allen, Billy Apple, Phil Dadson, Pauline Rhodes, Nick Spill, B'art homme, Eva Yuen, Ian Hunter, Terrence Handscombe, Stuart Porter, Peter Roche, Bruce Barber, Andrew Drummond and Darcy Lange. Collective events like F1 sculpture project and organisations like the Artist's Co-op and the uninvited storming of the 3rd Sydney Biennale with 22 New Zealand artists in 1979 displayed number eight wire, kiwi panache.

An early 21st century iteration called Letting Space ran many programmes with large numbers of artists like Tao Wells who repurposed oft underutilized space to both challenge and inspire rethinking of the metropoli-scape. The 2011 Christchurch Earthquake saw the Gapfiller group reuse abandoned red zones for cultural, arts, gardens, and events.

=== Late 20th and early 21st centuries ===
The visual arts flourished in the later decades of the 20th century. Many Māori artists became highly successful blending elements of Māori culture with European modernism. Ralph Hotere was New Zealand's highest selling living artist, but other such as Shane Cotton and Michael Parekowhai are also very successful. Many contemporary Māori artists reference ancient myths and cultural practices in their work such as Derek Lardelli, Lisa Reihana, Sofia Minson, Te Rongo Kirkwood, Robyn Kahukiwa, Aaron Kereopa, Rangi Kipa, John Miller, Kura Te Waru Rewiri, Tracey Tawhiao, Roi Toia, Shane Hansen, John Bevan Ford, Jennifer Rendall, Todd Couper, Manos Nathan, Wayne Youle, Lyonel Grant, Wi Taepa and David Teata.

The 1960s and 1970s saw New Zealand develop a craft movement that was in opposition to pop art and mass consumerism and followed on from the arts and craft movements critique of the mainstream. This artwork includes ceramics, textiles, jewellery and glass work over a wide range of themes and influences. These include Māori and Pasifika artists whose work brought an integrated worldview of fine arts, craft and design not separated with a Western hierarchy that came out of the European Renaissance in the fifteenth century. Craft-based New Zealand artists include Ruth Baird, Merilyn Wiseman, Wi Taepa, Kobi Bosshard, Barry Brickell, Freda Brierley, Paerau Corneal, Ann Culy, Matarena George, and Susan Holmes, Humphrey Ikin, Rangi Kiu, Maureen Lander, Linley Main, Mike McGregor, John Parker, Baye Riddell, Emily Siddell and Diggeress Te Kanawa.

The Kiingi Tuheitia Portraiture Award is a biennial competition that started in 2021 hosted at the New Zealand Portrait Gallery Te Pūkenga Whakaata and intended to 'provide emerging Māori artists with the opportunity to showcase their talents on the national stage'. It tours around Aotearoa after the initial exhibition in Wellington.

== Art organisations and museums ==
The Crafts Council of New Zealand was established in 1965 and ceased in 1992. The Māori Artists and Writers Society, founded in 1973 and later known as Ngā Puna Waihanga, advocated for targeted government funding for Māori artists. Ngā Puna Waihanga influenced the set-up of the Council for Māori and South Pacific Arts (MASPAC) in 1978 (later replaced by Te Waka Toi in the 1990s). From this came the Mana Whakairo Carvers Committee and the Aotearoa-Moananui-a-Kiwa Weavers Committee. These came out Creative New Zealand the national agency for the development of the arts in New Zealand that was the Queen Elizabeth II Arts Council then.

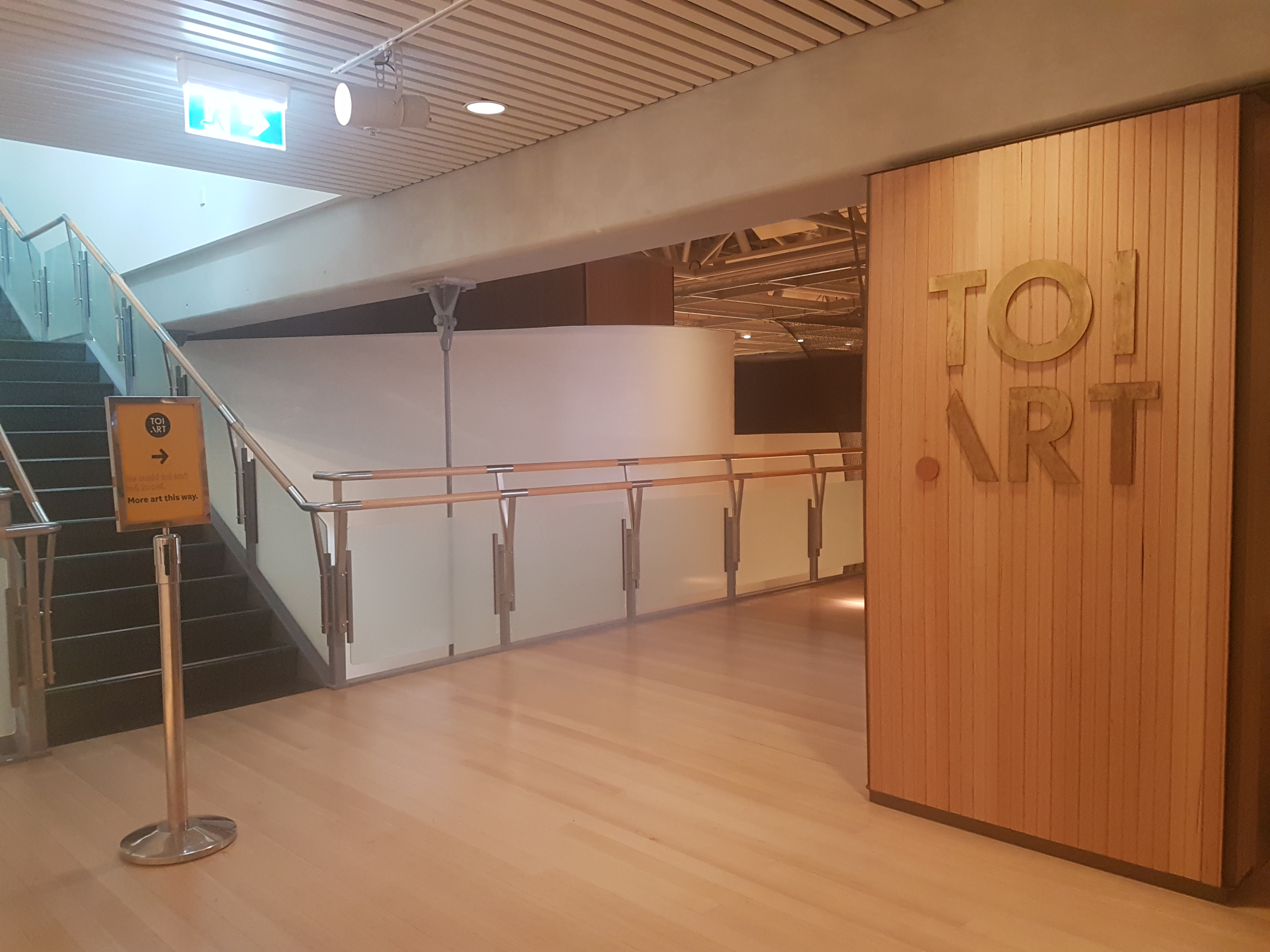
National Art Gallery inside Te Papa

The National Art Gallery of New Zealand was established in 1936, and was amalgamated into the Museum of New Zealand Te Papa Tongarewa in 1992. The Auckland Art Gallery is New Zealand's largest art institution with a collection numbering over 15,000 works,

Waikato Museum, Te Whare Taonga O Waikato located on the banks of the Waikato River in downtown Hamilton.

Tautai Pacific Arts Trust and Fibre Gallery are important public Pacific galleries, with Tautai situated on Karangahape Road, Auckland, and Fibre Gallery on Cashel Street, Christchurch. They are established in response to other public galleries in New Zealand not showing enough Pacific arts, and to empower the Pacific community in New Zealand. Bergman Gallery also shows many Pacific art, and increasingly New Zealand Asian art as well.

== Art schools ==
New Zealand has four university-based fine art schools: AUT School of Art and Design at Auckland University of Technology, Ilam School of Fine Arts at the University of Canterbury (formerly Canterbury College School of Art) was founded in 1882, Elam School of Fine Arts at the University of Auckland was founded in 1890 and Massey School of Fine Arts founded in 1885, but was not officially a university institution until 2000. There are also several other tertiary level fine arts schools not affiliated to universities such as Whitecliffe School of Fine Arts.

== See also ==
- Architecture of New Zealand
- List of New Zealand artists
- Māori culture
