= Artists' Co-op (Wellington) =

Art collective in New Zealand (1978–1982)

- Formation: 1978
- Founded at: Wellington
- Dissolved: 1982
- Key people: Bridie Lonie, Barry Thomas, Gary Griffiths

The Artists' Co-op (Inc.) was a collectively run artists organisation which ran from March 1978 until 1982, and was based on the top floor of the Dalgety Woolstore in Thorndon Quay Wellington. It gave work, studios, a performance venue and exhibition space for artists.

It is best known as a liberal artists' incubator community for conceptual artists, improvised music, and other arts.

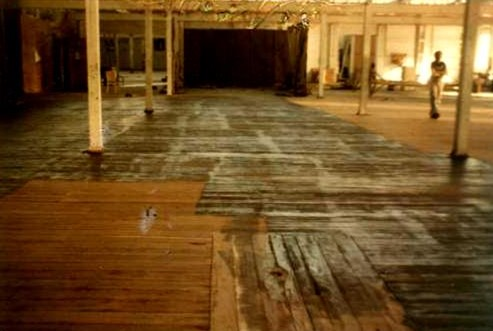
A $3,000 QE11 Arts Council grant funded the hard costs of sanding and varnishing the round stages and the design and construction of several 3m. tall and 5m. long, mobile sound baffles.

== Origins ==
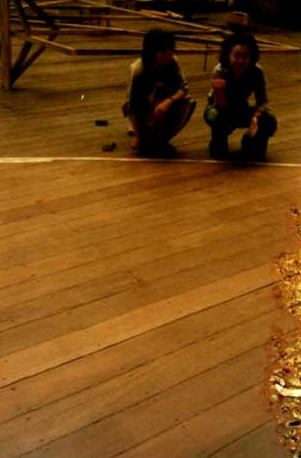
Eva Yuen meets Prime Minister - Robert Muldoon's dept. representative Helene Wong and Internal Affairs' Jim Booth to discuss the work developing the co-op premises. The sound baffle walls can be seen being constructed at rear. Co-op member artists were employed on TEP to do this work which included the co-op office.

In early 1978, Bridie Lonie, Barry Thomas, Gary Griffiths and others started meeting with the idea of forming an artists' co-op in Wellington. An advertisement was lodged in Victoria University's Salient Magazine on 21 March 1978 inviting people to attend the co-op's inaugural meeting at the National Museum Theatrette at the Dominion Museum in Buckle Street.

The meeting discussed the establishment of an incorporated society for the new co-operative with its own working agenda and constitution. Then Eva Yuen, Ross Boyd and Ian Hunter, Stuart Porter, Gerard Crewdson, Gaylene Preston joined in to start the co-op.

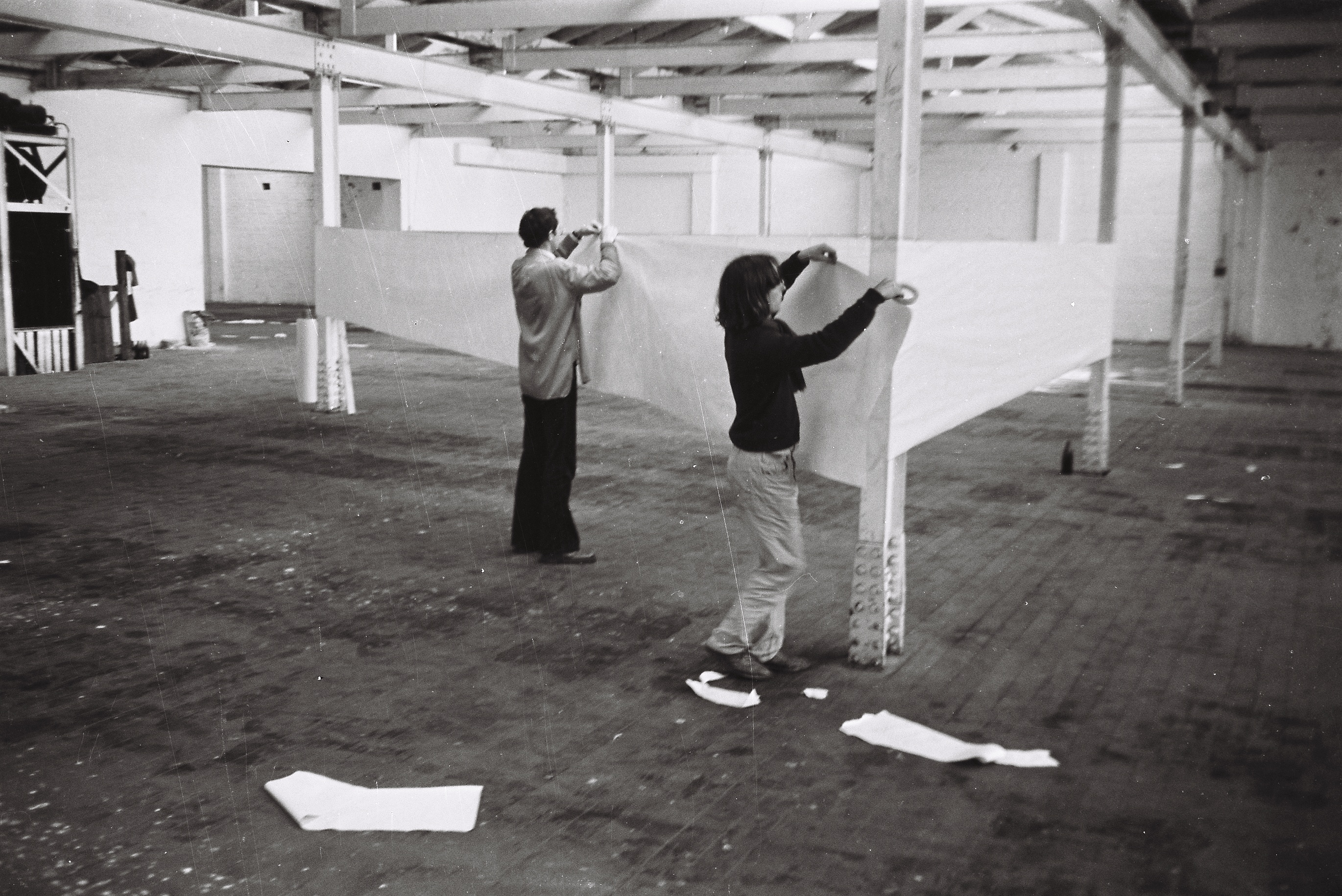
Mark Hantler, Derek LeDayn and Chris Lipscombe put up Barry Thomas' "Three handed Chess" performance triangle 1978.

The search for premises finally turned up the 33,000 square foot vacant Dalgety wool store penthouse with sawtooth glass roofed lighting.

An establishing grant from the Queen Elizabeth 2nd Arts Council (Creative New Zealand) of $3,000 enabled members to refurbish the large space, sand and varnish floors into circular "floor stages" in the round for both performers and audience. Members also constructed several large, portable sound baffle walls that were wheeled around to dampen the reverberant spaces and isolate the stages. Artists also constructed their own office and studios.

Several public events and exhibitions were held including artists and groups ranging from poets like Gary McCormick and Ian Wedde to photographers, conceptual artists, painting, sculpture, performances, Intervention art, happenings, free jazz and improvised music.

There was a sense that Wellington was a grey concrete capital with a "bureaucratic soul" according to writer Chris Trotter. The co-op filled a niche in country's artworld which was at a turning point as curator Robert Leonard described it "possessing the independent energy and coherence of an art movement."

== Members and contributors ==
Co-op members, performers and exhibitors numbered over 50 and included Barry Thomas, Ian Hunter, Pauline Rhodes, Andrew Drummond, Jeanne Macaskill, Gary McCormick, Ian Wedde, Gary Henderson, Stuart Porter, Gerard Crewdson, Mark Hantler and Gaylene Preston (trade union representative). The co-op supplied artists, cartoonists and photographers for union publications, posters etc.

== Groups ==
Several co-op members became the Primitive Art Group and the Braille Collective of improvising musicians.

- Wide Mouth Frogs
- The Gebbe Sisters: Janet, Katherine and Ngaio.
- Larf Theatre group
- Chameleon
- Allan Thomas' Gamelan orchestra
- Krishna Rock - "Living Force"
- Hackett
- Jim Allen's "Naked Bodies"

== Exhibitions, performances, art works ==
- Andrew Drummond: - Ngauranga set - Twenty Directions in an Enclosure, Body/Skin Suspension Piece, Onto Skin, Like a Bull at a Gate.
- Ian Hunter: - Sleep over performances.
- Barry Thomas: - "Williama Wei," "Wasting Time," "Whose who's who?", "Three handed Chess."
- Bridie Lonie: - Painted there and had an installation "Egg piece" - a double spiral of real eggs on floor.
- Pauline Rhodes: - "Thank you Eva" sculpture installation
- Eva Yuen: - "Composition in chalk and string"
- Peter Roche and Linda Buis, David Mealing - all performed at the Co-op
- Ian Wedde: - "Ancient Mariner", "Halfway to the Sea"
- Bob Orr: - "Capricorn Song for Ezra"
- Marion McLeod: - "Dark Circles in the Dawn"
- Mark Hantler and Justin Keen photographs
- Brian King
- Gary Henderson: - "The old Man Son"
- Lindsay Rabbitt: - "Vicious poems"
- David Mealing: - "Desolation Row: A Socio—Political Statement"
- Stuart Porter: - Large Cartoon-like paintings
- Allan Thomas: - Gamelan
- Jennifer Shennan: - Dance
- Megan McBride screwed paper
- Peter Baker drawing
- Jeanne Mcaskill Painting, drawing, buttons
- Matt Lenniston
- Pauline Weeds
- John Bailey

=== New Zealand Academy of Fine Arts ===
Five co-op members Eva Yuen, Ian Hunter, Barry Thomas, Ross Boyd and Terrence Handscomb exhibited their work at the NZ Academy of Fine arts in 1978 in a show entitled Work organised by Ian Hunter.

=== Sydney Biennale 1979 rebel tour ===
Artists' Co-op members took part in the "rebel tour" of the third Sydney Biennale 1979, which saw 22 New Zealand artists travel uninvited to perform works there. Thomas performed "Advantage Server" and made string works, as he had been delivering them in several locations in Wellington: at the Vacant Lot of Cabbages tying up Claremont Grove and teaming up with his flatmates to deliver the Claremont Grove Street directory. Further string works were performed at the YWCA and more recently in 2017 in Dunedin and two in Japan 2023. Jill Stoker attended the biennale. Eva Yuen found accommodation for all the artists at the old Marist Brothers School in Darlinghurst and Ian Hunter performed and raised funds for the rebel tour. Andrew Drummond, Nick Spill, Peter Roche, Gary McCormick, Philip Dadson's "From Scratch" and Don McGlashan were also part of the New Zealand rebel contingent.

== Programmes and collective works ==
=== Last Sundays and A Month of Sundays ===
The co-op ran various programmes - Last Sundays and A Month of Sundays from December 1978 including many fine and popular arts, improvised music like Porter's band, Thomas' "wasting time", Ian Wedde, Lindsay Rabbitt, Marion McLeod, Gary McCormick and Bob Orr, Dyllis Rheese's Poetry, singer/ songwriters Brian King and Gary Henderson performed along with Groups like Hackett and Living Force. The Wide Mouthed Frogs had their first ever public performance at the Last Sundays gigs.

=== War Memorial "Protest" 1978 ===
Wellington War Memorial "Protest" 1978 was a collective work that came from a public meeting held at the co-op and attended by Peter Frater, Rob Taylor, Barry Thomas, Graeme Stradling, Mark Hantler, Gerard Crewdson and others. The meeting centred on the aim to make a public statement against War.

=== Sheepmeat magazine ===
The co-op produced one issue of its Magazine "Sheepmeat" which was largely written by Ian Hunter with contributions from Stephanie Edmond - it was designed by Eva Yuen and John Bailey.

== Wellington summer festivals ==
Several co-op members employed by the Artists' Co-op contributed to the first Summer City festival in Wellington 'Summer '79'. Gerard Crewdson drew portraits of event attendees, Barry Thomas delivered the conceptual Williama Wei performance on a bicycle with a mask of nikau palm fronds and Stuart Porters' jazz band performed and the co-op space hosted a fine arts exhibition.

In 1981 the co-op was used again by Summer City when artists Duncan Sargent, Liz Ngan, Gerard Crewdson and Barry Thomas constructed a three-story-tall pair of flying lips which were designed to fly using helium but were finally flown around the harbour under the helicopter of Peter Button on 14 February 1981.

== Place in New Zealand art history ==
In employing fourteen of its members under the Government's Temporary Employment Programme (TEP) (the partner to the later Project Employment Programme the co-op was the direct inspiration for Rohesia Hamilton Metcalf to create the Wellington City Council's Summer '79 programme, entertaining the public with the arts in the parks of the capital.

The co-op has direct links to the Women's Gallery through Bridie Lonie. Art Base with 28 artists at Shelly Bay was co-founded by Barry Thomas and Sva Brooke-White in 1999 and was later joined by many others including Jeanne Macaskill.

The Artists' Co-op was the starting point of musicians Stuart Porter, Gerard Crewdson, Anthony Donaldson who went on to found and significantly contribute to many bands, recording studios and venues such as Fred's and the Pyramid Club run by Nell Thomas, Johnny Marks, Daniel Beban and others.

=== Co-op as incubator ===
The short lived co-op managed to kick start new artistic relationships, develop skills, provide a venue, employment for young artists. Several co-op artists shifted to the Wellington Art Centre's Summer City programme where they were employed entertaining, making films and art.

- Ian Hunter went on to running the F1 Sculpture Project and Anzus art collective events.
- Terrence Handscombe spent several years teaching in universities in LA and Europe returning to New Zealand in 2012 to continue his practice.
- Eva Yuen has led an eclectic art life including being a practicing Buddhist
- Barry Thomas worked for Summer City, and started a film production company.
- Stuart Porter co-founded many groups including Primitive Art Group, Braille Records and The Family Mallet. He toured and recorded with The Bilders and performed with The Garbage & The Flowers. He has also continues to make visual art paintings
- Gerard Crewdson has a long artistic output and makes idiosyncratic work that draws on 'visual art, sound, moving image and narrative' and performances including the cardboard box cinema.
- Photographer Justin Keen established his own film company and worked mainly in Asia.
- Andrew Drummond went on to a long career creating public works of art.
- Jill Stoker worked as a freelance textile designer and started Fingerprints Handprinted Fabrics with Graeme Crawley. She later worked in sustainable transport and road safety.
- Pauline Rhodes has exhibited widely over a long career in New Zealand.
- The Wide Mouthed Frogs morphed into the Crocodiles with lead singer Jenny Morris going on to a solo career in Australia.
- Phill Simmonds and brother Jeff still make and perform music and they Rangi TV animations and "Documation" loosely based on the Wallace and Gromit "creature comforts" use of animation with documentary interviews.
- Bridie Lonie went on to start the Women's Gallery with Marian Evans then left to teach at the Dunedin School of Art becoming its Head in 2022 and completing her PHD on the subject of art and climate change.
- Mark Hantler went on to document the 1981 Springbok tour and become a film cameraman with the Natural History unit.
- Neill Duncan became a well known musician.
- David McLeod moved from sculpting to jewellery teaching at Polytech to running jewellery collectives.
- Anthony Donaldson has contributed significantly to Wellington's music scene - along with Stuart Porter he was a member of the Primitive Art Group, Family Mallet, The Buccaneers, 4 Volts, 6 Volts and the Braille Collective. He has contributed with his brother David Donaldson to many bands.
- Gaylene Preston went on to becoming a leading film maker.
- Several artists were picked up in a collective show entitled "Wellington Potential" exhibition held at the Elva Bett Gallery Cuba Street 1979 including Barry Thomas planting real "Lettuces" in soil on the gallery floor.
