= Vacant Lot of Cabbages =

Environmental sculpture by Barry Thomas

The Vacant Lot of Cabbages (known colloquially as "The Cabbage Patch") was an art intervention by artist Barry Thomas in Wellington, New Zealand. On 4 January 1978, Thomas planted 150 cabbage seedlings spelling the word "CABBAGE" on an empty site. It was an early guerrilla vegetable garden, planted on a derelict, demolished, building site at the central city intersection of Manners St and Willis St. The art occupation lasted for nearly six months and involved many other artists, architects, performers, schools, the Commission for the Environment, Wellington City Council, QEII Arts Council, and green groups with significant engagement from the citizens of Wellington. After many spontaneous events and headlines, Thomas and collaborators completed the installation with a week-long festival.

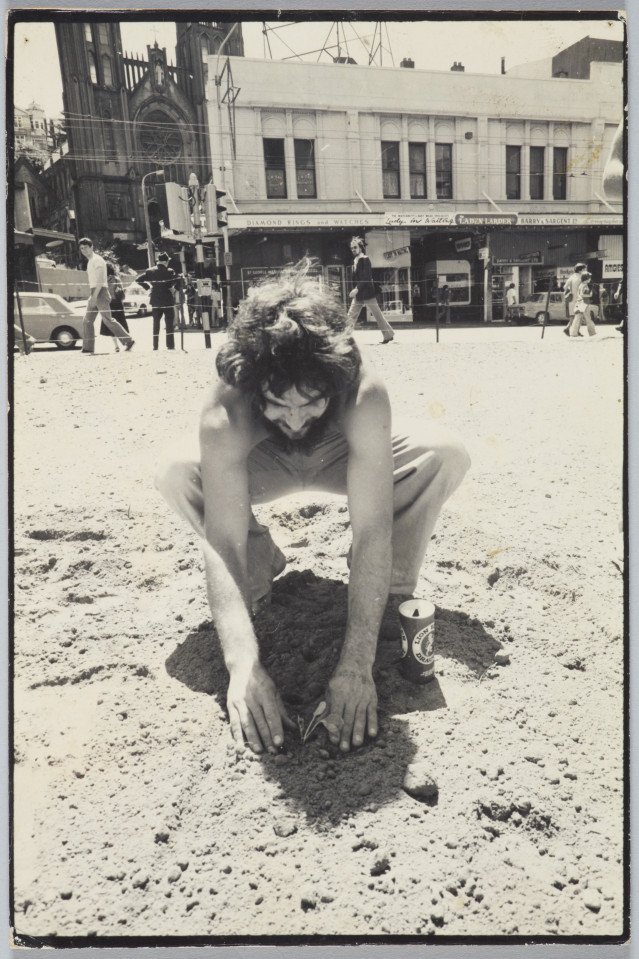
Thomas plants the first of 150 cabbage seedlings after giving a speech about how this land had not seen food crops for well over a century. Photo, Justin Keen

== Location ==
The Vacant Lot of Cabbages was planted on the site where the Duke of Edinburgh Hotel and the Roxy Cinema were formerly located. In 1975 the central city site was purchased by Anthony Kostanich and the AM and KM Griffiths Trust. The two buildings on the site were demolished, leaving it vacant for over 2 years. The site was described as an 'eyesore' by local media. The Duke of Edinburgh Hotel was popular with Wellington's radical, artistic intelligentsia, such as poet James K. Baxter and Geoff Murphy from Blerta. The Roxy Theatre was a 24 hour continuous cinema.

== Inspiration ==
Thomas was a cameraperson at the National Film Unit and had studied art at the Ilam School of fine arts. Vacant Lot of Cabbages was a response to public pressure arising from the vacant site.

Thomas read news reports of the Values Party members, Terry McDavitt and Judy Reinken, who attempted to plant native trees on the site. He studied Jack Burnham's "The structure of art" and felt that growing food as a work of art in the heart of the city would be unique and viable. He had also read in Art in America of the replanting of indigenous biota in New York city by artists like Alan Sonfist. Like many New Zealanders at that time, Thomas' childhood was influenced by his family growing their own vegetables in their quarter-acre suburban plot.

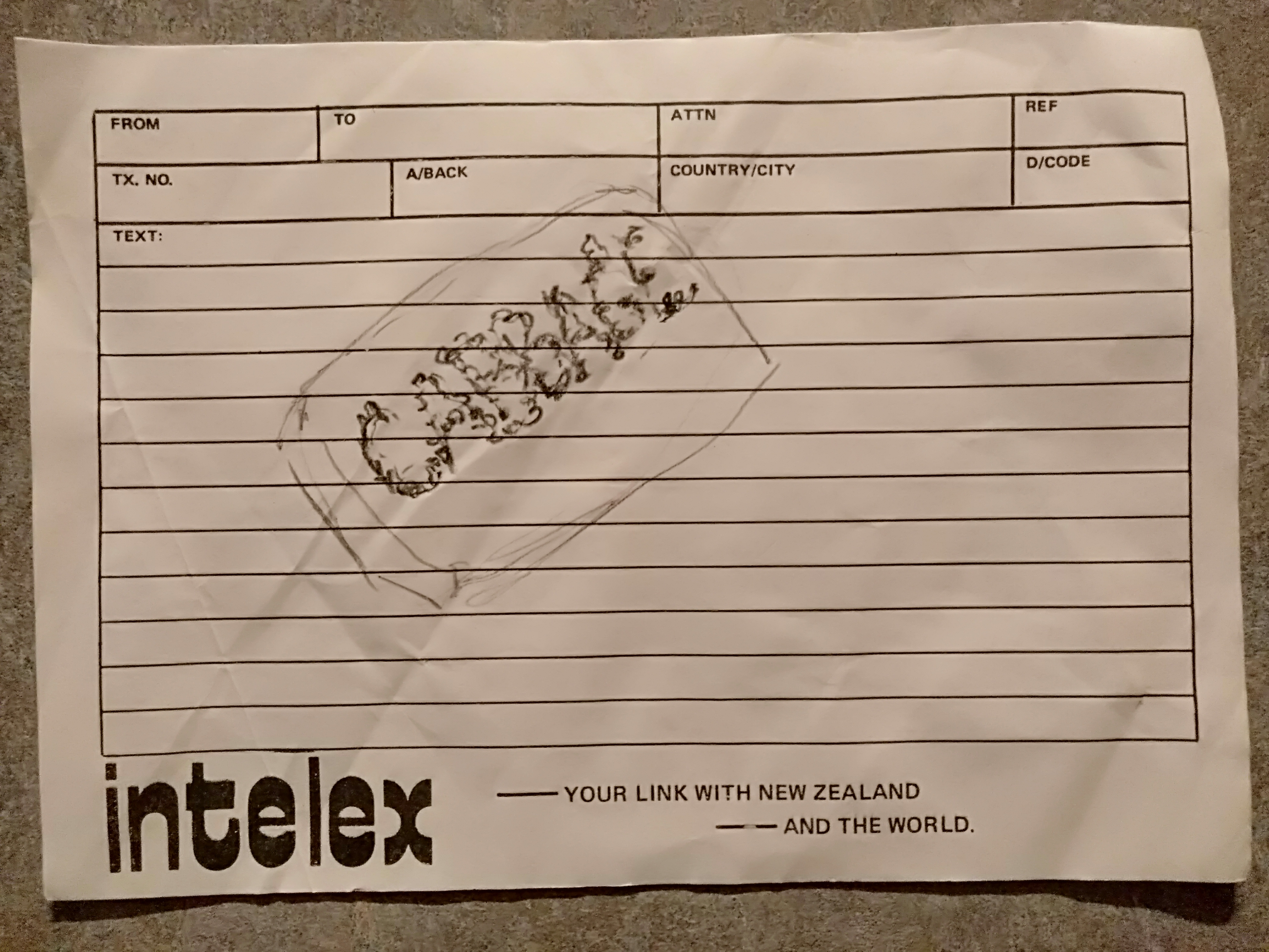
Facsimile of Thomas' original sketch for the Vacant lot of Cabbages made while convalescing from an operation in hospital in late 1977.

Thomas applied his interpretation of Marcel Duchamp's ideas around the importance of the observer in art by inviting Wellingtonians to participate. After the initial planting he challenged the public in the press to own the future viability of the site, the nurturing of the vulnerable plants, by tending and watering them. Thomas deliberately walked away from the work and went on holiday for three weeks to the far north. He later called this art challenge system "Jeter le gant." (Throwing down the glove and calling for a challenge). By writing the word "CABBAGE" using cabbage seedlings, Thomas played on Rene Magritte's "The treachery of images" by suggesting that the symbol or word for something can also be the thing itself.

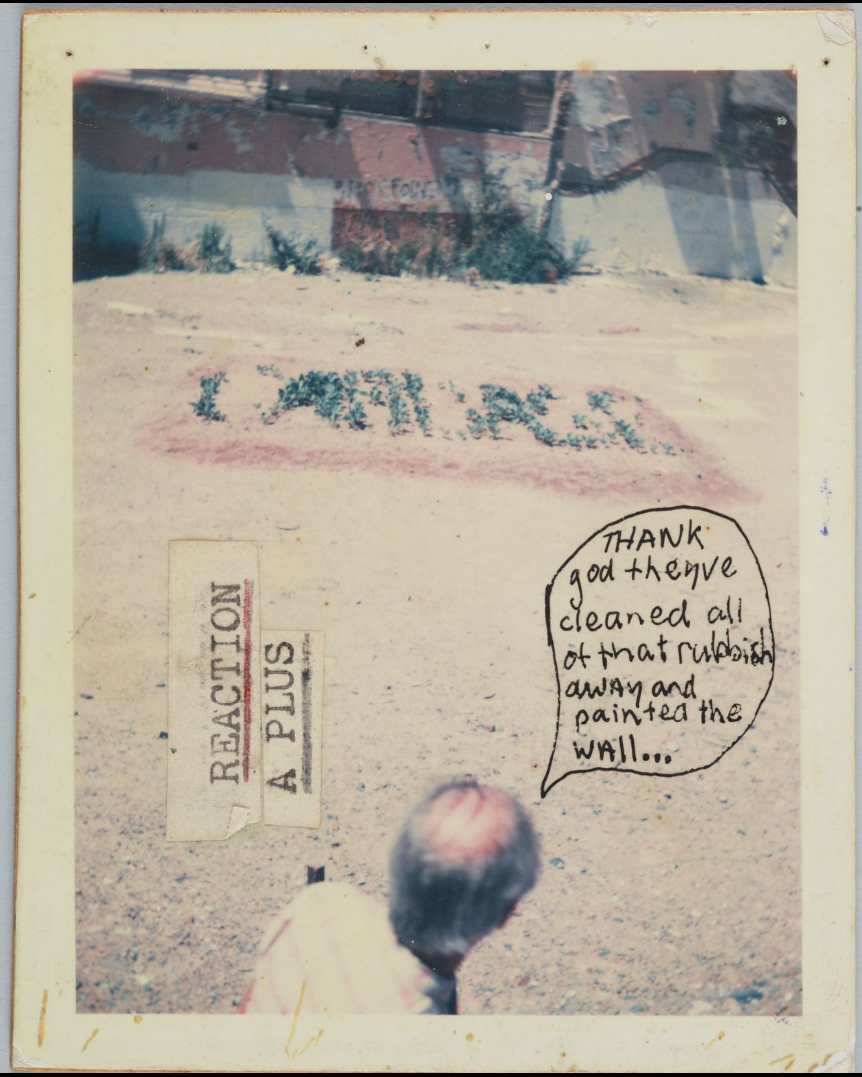
The word "CABBAGE" is legible. Thomas exhibited a classificatory linguistic idea around art being a provocatory action followed by viewer reaction. April 1978. Photo by Thomas.

Dr. Marcus Moore has described Thomas' modus operandi as working with people not about them.

== Artwork (Action) ==
On 4 January 1978 Thomas bought a truck load of topsoil. Helped by friends Hugh Walton, Chris Lipscombe, and Roger Nickel they set out a plant bed on the site. Photographer Justin Keen documented the event.

The site itself comprised compacted clay, concrete debris, and gravel. They cut the wire fence around the site to let the truck in, then tipped out the soil and raked it into a square. The press said no-one had previously thought of the idea of planting a food garden. Thomas bought 150 cabbage seedlings from the local gardening shop and the team set about planting out the seedlings in the shape of the word "CABBAGE." The adjacent fish shop provided a hose from their water tap to water the seedlings.

Thomas saw the Vacant Lot of Cabbages as a contest between the market forced zeitgeist of the age, the largely male dominated CBD land owners, the public's role therein, and the overpowering human domination of the environment – the nature/culture polemic.

In his 'book' "Vacant lot of cabbages – a bit" which he sold for 60c with Mark Hantler on the final day of the Last Roxy show 21 June 1978, he wrote two poems in which he described this art event as "He had an idea, born of frustration... doleing[sic] responsibility [to the public]" and he called "Time gentlemen..."

== Reaction ==
On 5 January 1978 The Evening Post wrote an article titled "Mystery garden appears on city's problem section" planted by a "Phantom Gardener." The paper suggested that the garden had been planted in the dead of night. Although the New Zealand Values Party had wanted to make a park of the eyesore site, they had been unaware of the vegetable garden. Even the visiting Spike Milligan was initially blamed. The next day Thomas met with a reporter and the artwork became front page news. In the article Thomas declared the garden as a work of art and challenged the public and council, saying "Whether they [the public] just leave them, or steal them, or run over them with motorbikes is part of the art because it is a reflection of our culture... It's a unification of nature with the culture of our society."

Thomas initially fed the seedlings with chicken manure. Other artists, environmental groups, and activists helped look after the garden. The landowner stated that he wished the garden well and he hoped they had a fruitful crop.

In the next few weeks the site became a "soap box art corner" as other people added to the installation. Additions included an IBM mainframe 7330 computer magnetic tape unit plugged into the cabbage patch by Joe Bleakley, Brian Kassler and flatmates; two TV sets; a bust of Beethoven watching TV; a grave with an emerging corpse; a sign "eat at Joe's"; a toilet; couches, an armchair; a clothes washing machine; an electric heater; a telephone; a pile of Playboy magazines; a garden gnome party and a scarecrow; an old garden gate; a letter box; a section of fence; tables; "Basil" a waiter with a cabbage head and a carrot nose wearing a boiler suit; a solitary beer bottle; an assortment of flags; a crate of empty beer bottles; a family photo; and a milk bottle full of flowers.

On 16 January a pink monocycle, fashioned from a child's tricycle by George Rose, joined the site. Alister Barry and Rose attached it to the northern wall of the site eight metres up using dyna-bolt fasteners. The monocycle had a fluorescent, pink spray painted trail that ran from a street-side storm water drain on Manners Street, under the cabbage patch, and up to the Duchampian cycle.

The cabbages were watered by locals including Jerry Luccros of Zenith's plant shop who used the adjacent fish shop's hose and tap. The Cabbage Patch drew larger crowds than the Dominion Museum. Then mayor Sir Michael Fowler praised the interventions for humorously drawing attention to the vacant site.

On 25 January 1978, having received complaints and a verbal request from the absent owners (Mr. Tony Kostanich and the AM and KM Griffiths Trust) the Wellington City Council considered doing something about the pop-up art corner. Deputy Town Clerk Allan Smyth discussed matters with the police and lawyers and decided to clear the "home away from home" site. Smyth left the cabbages alone, saying "the cabbage patch is probably harmless and can, I think, remain for a while at least."

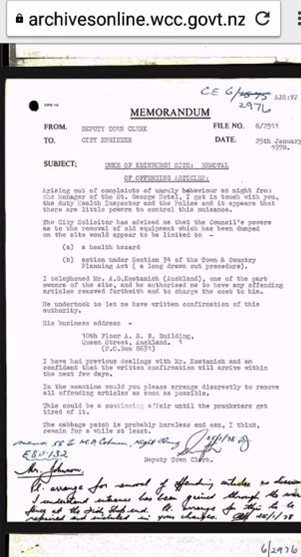
Wellington City Council Memo ordering the clearance of the site, "but the cabbage patch is probably harmless and can, I think, remain for a while at least." WCC archives

In May 1978 a group of women variously known as W.O.N.A.A.C. and W.A.G. (Women's action groups around abortion and citizen rights) repurposed a large papier-mâché pig with the face of the then Prime Minister Robert Muldoon. They placed the pig in with the cabbages. On its side they had painted the words "Media, media stop the Pig – time to stop dancing to his Jig." The pig on the site was headlined in newspapers when Pat Sheeran, likely a Muldoon supporter, moved the pig to the side of the site.

== A Festival for Trees, the Last Roxy Show and the Free Coleslaw Party 17–21 June 1978 ==
Landscape architect Bryan McDonald (of Arbor Promotions ltd.) had exhibited Native Gardens in a nearby art gallery in early 1978. He was then approached by John Hill of the then Commission for the Environment who initiated the idea to explore ways to advocate for native forests - fauna and flora using the fame of the Cabbage Patch. Architect Sir Ian Athfield, Barry McIntyre and Barry Thomas were included to round out the team to collaborate on creating a festival to end the Vacant Lot of Cabbages occupation. The festival was given three names - A Festival for Trees, the Free Coleslaw Party and the overarching Last Roxy Show that continued the project's connection with the environment.

The Commission for the Environment, the Wellington Regional Arts Council, Wellington City Council, Forest and Bird, the Native Forest Action Council (NFAC) and private interests all sponsored and supported the event. The site's owner was also in favour.

The five-day long Festival ran from 17–21 June 1978. Fifty cabbages and seven bags of carrots were made into free coleslaw for the audience. Sir Ian Athfield designed a travelling cottage which acted as a show-home advocating for native forests. The cottage was built by Barry McIntyre and was later towed around the North Island selling and promoting native trees.

Around 100 children, staff and parents from Matauranga School, Cashmere Avenue, Clyde Quay School, St. Peter and Paul's Primary schools all marched through the central city from Rutherford House to the site. The cottage was drawn by two Clydesdale horses loaned by a Levin farmer. Children and teachers dressed up as threatened native birds including papier-mâché bird masks.

Photographer Ans Westra documented much of the final day, and Dame Gaylene Preston took hundreds of polaroid photographs of attendees which she displayed on the walls. "Fame or mine"

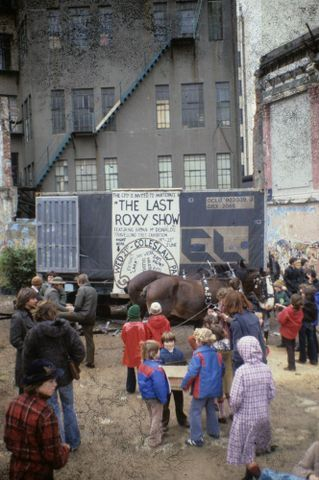
People begin arriving for the Last Roxy Show including the drought horses that towed the Tree cottage. Dame Gaylene Preston can be seen taking her polaroid photos. Thomas Photo.

Tall murals were painted around the remaining walls of the site by students and staff from Wellington High School and Saint Patrick's College. They were led by painters Robert McLeod and Robert Taylor. The murals emulated McCahon's style and included native tree names and graffiti style slogans to promote saving New Zealand's native forests and fauna.

The site was covered with young native trees lent by the council. Simulated bird calls blended with traffic noise. A stage was created from two soft covered truck trailers from which performers, dancers, musicians, and poets including Ian Wedde and Sam Hunt performed.

The Red Mole theatre troupe performed "Harold Bigsby comes to town." This story centred around a character encouraged by the Minister of Lands, Venn Young to go and make a living chopping native trees. "if you wanna earn some money gotta chop down trees, forget all those thoughts bout the birds and the bees..." Sam Neill's film "Red Mole on the road" depicts this drama.

Chris Lipscombe researched and displayed archival documents that displayed the successive ownership of the site.

Due to fears the cabbages might contain lead, chemists analysed the cabbages and found them fit to eat.

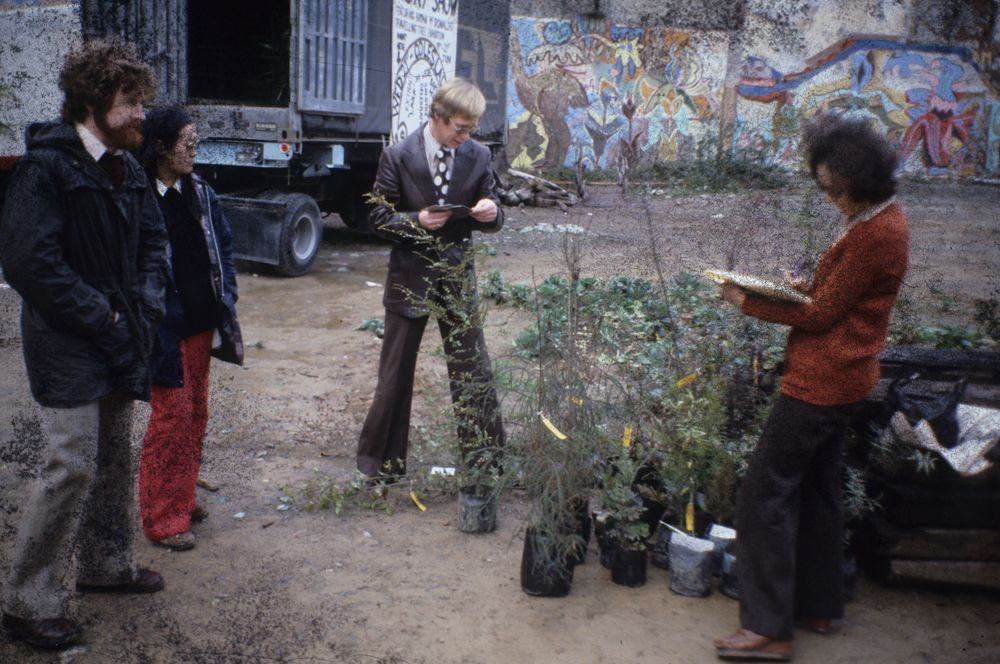
Wellington City Council staff accounting for native trees loaned to the festival. Two covered soft top truck trailers were loaned as the improvised stage (at rear) along with Environmental murals by local High Schools. Thomas Photo.

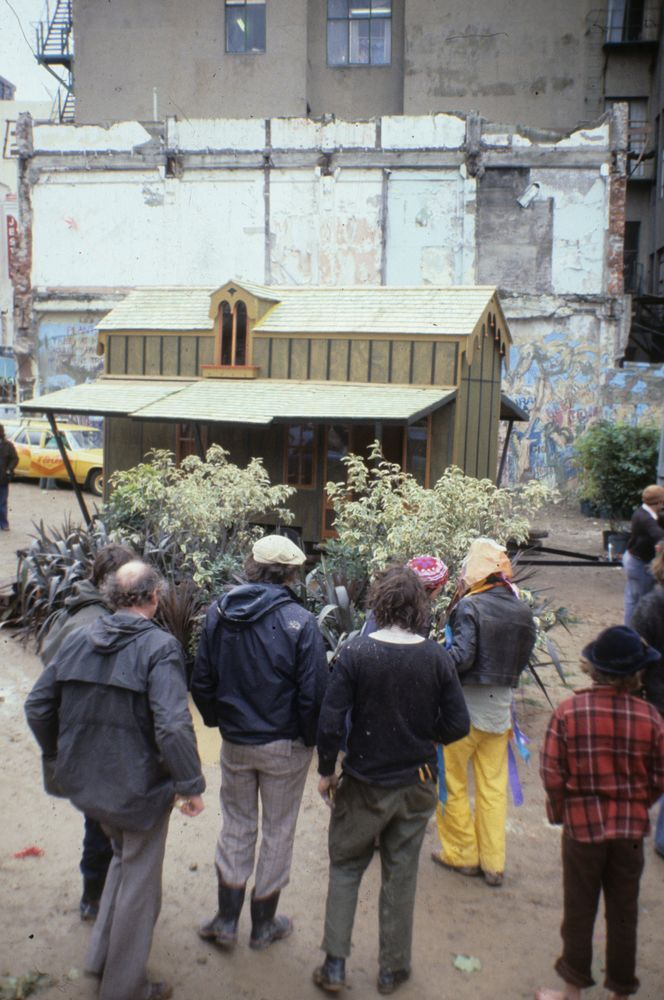
Setting up the Festival of trees and Last Roxy show: Sir Ian Athfield's travelling trees cottage made by Bryan McDonald and Barry McIntyre which was towed in a street parade through the streets of the capital. Thomas photo.

== The Phoenix ending ==
The Vacant Lot of Cabbages, The Last Roxy Show and The Free Coleslaw Party all finished on the winter solstice, 21 June 1978. The untouched cabbages were ceremonially harvested and sacrificially burned by Thomas to the beat of Red Mole theatre troupe's band. An anthropologist gave a historical account of the Bastion Point occupation which had ended a month prior. Faux scientists in white coats lectured on stage and Thomas encouraged the audience to chant "roast pork and cabbages."

Thomas was dressed in a white Arab Dishdash and a black Catholic Cassock. His was face painted half black and half white, reflecting Thomas' unificatory, anti-polemic, anti-war ideals. Children wound a rope through the crowd encircling the cabbages and a knot was tied into a circle uniting the audience.

Stephanie Edmond wrote "Nature came to the city but it had to come invited through the artist under the name 'work of art' (culture)."

== Wider influence ==
The Vacant Lot of Cabbages was an early example of many art movements: Tactical Urbanism, Situationist, Participatory, Conceptual, Post Object Art, Relational, Environmental, Intervention, Street, Discursive, Community, Socially engaged practice, Outside the Gallery, Guerrilla, Feral, Political, Activist art, Anthropocene, Site-specific art.

Mark Amery has cited the Vacant Lot of Cabbages and its links with the Occupy movement as an early example of artists being respected as key social leaders.

The editorial of the Evening Post summed the final week's Last Roxy Show as a "Respite from Ugliness" and how the festival gave the city a much needed lift.

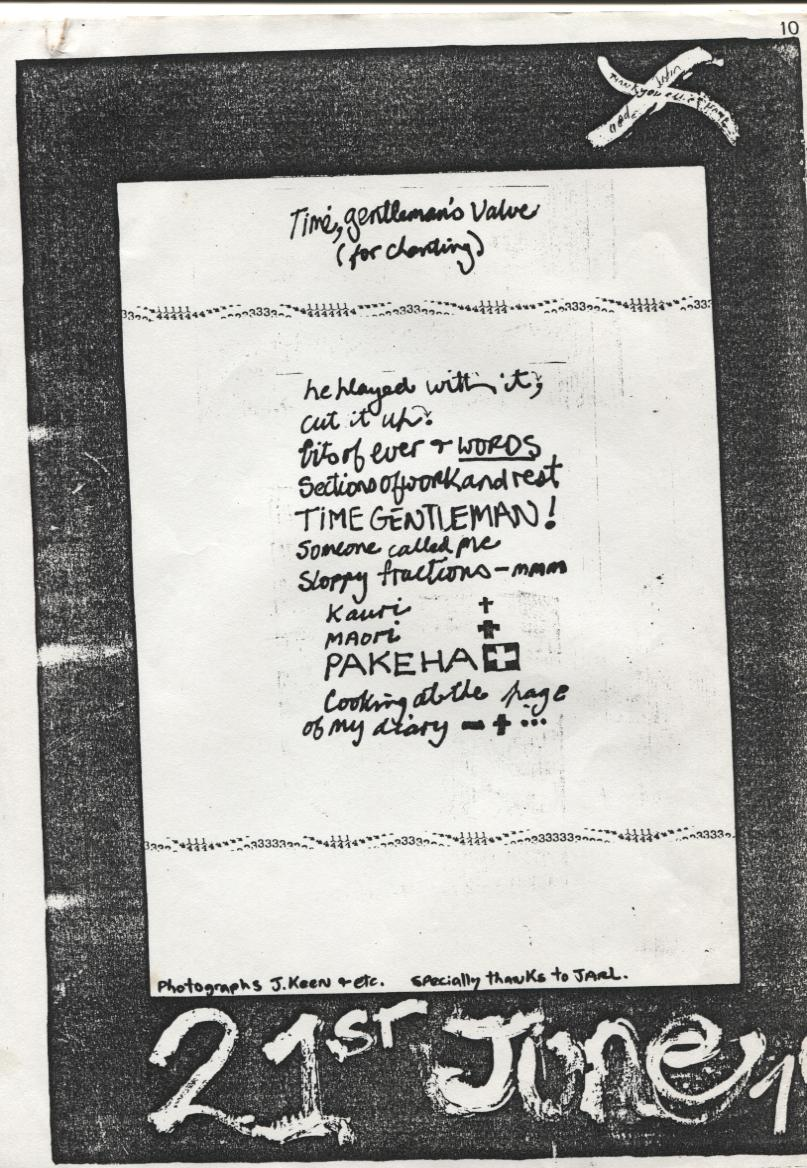
The Poem "Time gentlemen" was published in Thomas' book "Vacant lot of Cabbages – a bit" and talks of calling time on the male oligarchy. The site of the Vacant Lot of Cabbages formerly housed the famed watering hole The Duke of Edinburgh Hotel that was demolished leaving the site vacant for 2.5 years.

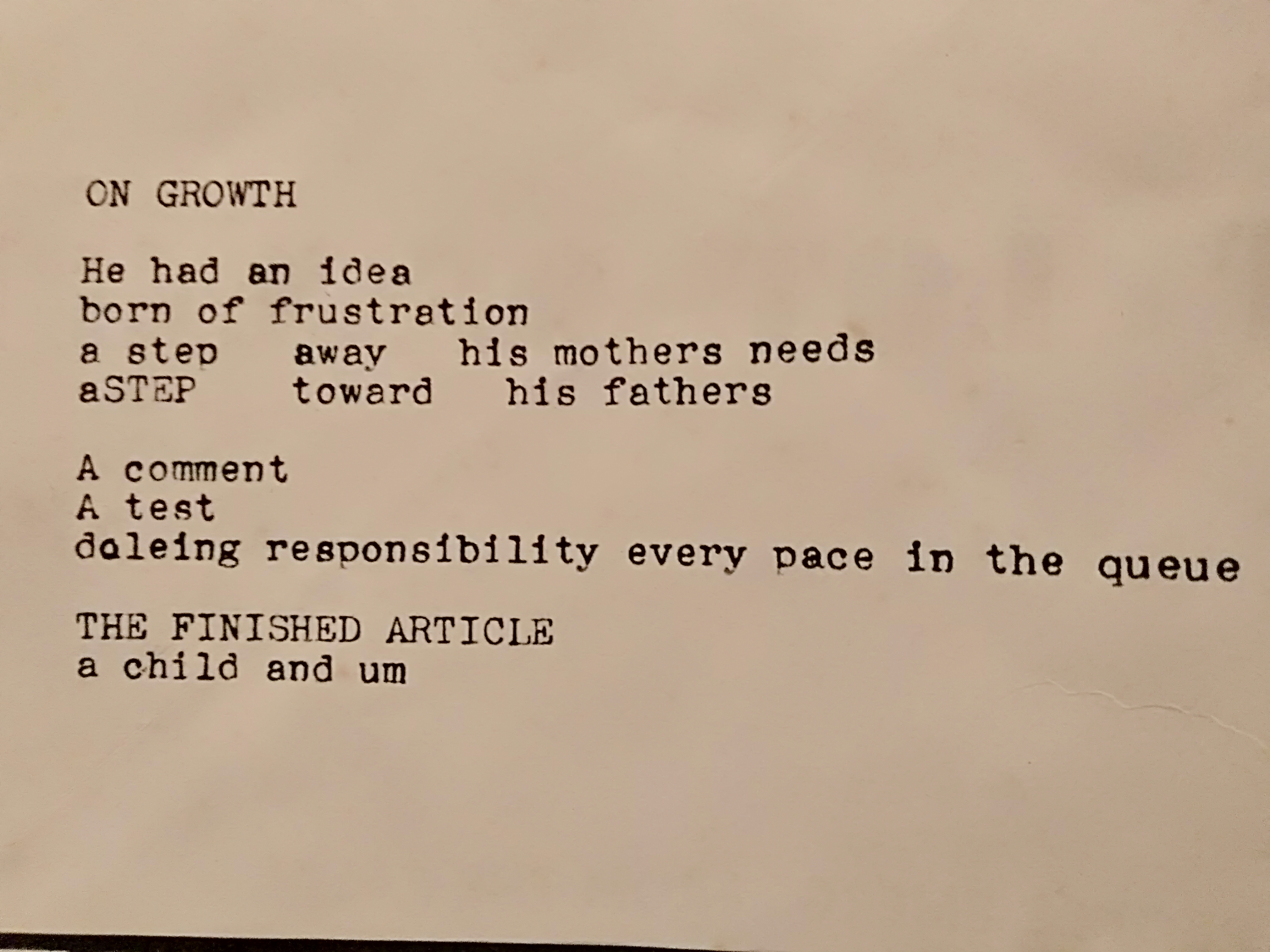
"On Growth" is a poem Thomas published in the book he sold on 21 June 1978 "Vacant lot of Cabbages – a bit" linking the movement that issued from the publication of "Limits to growth 1972." Thomas can be seen selling the book at the National Library of New Zealand

Chris Trotter identified the Vacant Lot of Cabbages as "a conceptual artistic statement against the life-negating conservatism of the Muldoon years [which] quite literally grew into a life-affirming (and edible) challenge to Wellington's bureaucratic soul".

It was claimed that people passing the Vacant Lot of Cabbages in buses laughed all the way to the railway station, some two kilometers away. The site prompted Truth to describe Wellington as the "New Zealand humour capital". Thomas' art also sought to engage and foster community in the context of growing global environmental concerns.

Dr. Bridie Lonie wrote that the Cabbage Patch was an early forerunner of Anthropocene environmental art, hence its inclusion in the international Eco Art Database. Ian Wedde proposed that Vacant Lot of Cabbages was like an ecological territorial land-squabble. As a result of the success of Vacant Lot of Cabbages, Thomas and others, including Ian Hunter, started the Artists' Co-op which incubated conceptual, Free-Jazz and more traditional artists and employed them on the Government's Temporary Employment Programme (TEP) employment scheme. This led directly to the establishment of Summer City, which since 1979 has repurposed under-patronised public parks and reserves as entertainment venues.

The Values Party of New Zealand called for all future sites awaiting development to be used as "People's parks". Wellington has also annually hosted another re-purposing of public space for art – the Performance Arcade, which houses art performances in temporarily placed shipping-containers.

In 1979 Thomas (along with several other artists from the Artists' co-op) exhibited a set of documents relating to the Vacant Lot of Cabbages at the New Zealand Academy of Fine Arts in Wellington.

In 2012 Te Papa Tongarewa bought Thomas' archive of the event, claiming it represented "an important moment in New Zealand's art and social history."

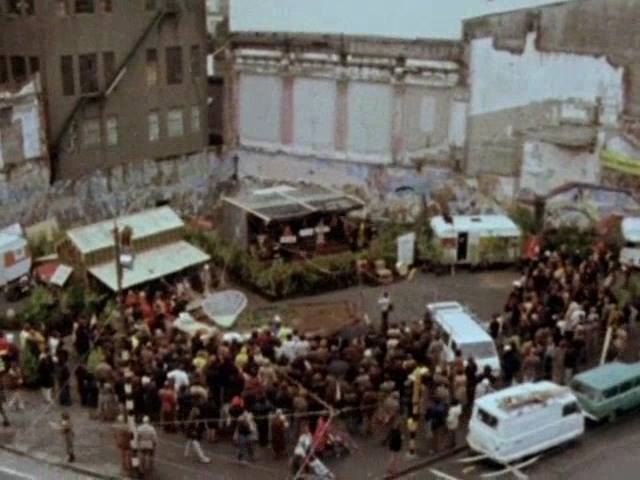
Still from the film "Red Mole on the road" 21 June 1978. Last day of the Vacant lot of Cabbages, the Last Roxy Show and A festival for trees.

== Art and the media ==
In one of six front page stories Thomas declared the garden as his work of art sidestepped the usual planning regulations and decision making laws by challenging and handing over the baton or paint brush to the citizenry: "whether they [the public] just leave them, steal them or run them over with motorbikes, it's part of the art because it's a reflection of our culture....It's a unification of nature with the culture of our society."

The Vacant Lot of Cabbages made national television news more than once.

Vacant Lot of Cabbages was included in the exhibition "When art hits the headlines" twice. First, Thomas uninvitedly rewrote the show's billboard to read "Hen art it's headles[s]" Secondly, the show's curators stated that the public and newspapers closely monitored the Vacant Lot of Cabbages' growth.

Before the site was cleared, media coverage suggested that the Vacant Lot of Cabbages had contributed to a more positive perception of Wellington, while the spontaneous additions to the installation reflected public engagement with the project.

City Councillor (and later Human Rights Commissioner) Rosslyn Noonan said "The cabbage patch … always seemed to me to reflect a special Wellington spirit which grew over the next few years and contributed to make Wellington the liveable, human city it became."

In 1978, historian Redmer Yska, writing for New Zealand Truth, added to the humour associated with the project by saying the Cabbage Patch's time was up because the whole site was being transplanted to New York to be exhibited in MoMA's South Pacific wing, "Wellington's loss and New York's gain".

== Vacant Lot of Cabbages' connections with the Values Party ==
The Values Party had several interactions with the Vacant Lot of Cabbages site. Members attempted to plant native trees on it and called for public parks to be made on all vacant building sites, starting with the Vacant Lot of Cabbages site.

== Archives ==
Thomas and Michael Nixon interviewed 23 people who were associated with the Vacant Lot of Cabbages. These video tapes and transcripts are held at Te Papa.

Thomas' archives, including photographs, notebooks, and materials, are held at the Adam Art Gallery, J.C. Beaglehole Room (Victoria University), National Library, Wellington City Council Archives (, [2]), and Te Papa.

Justin Keen, Ans Westra, Bryan McDonald, Barry Thomas and Dame Gaylene Preston photographed the event.

== Similar art installations ==
- Yarn bombing
- Pop up 'pocket' parks and rain gardens have become commonplace in Wellington.
- Free Parking Tao Wells 2001 and Park(ing) day: since 2013, the Wellington Sculpture trust run an annual car "PARK(ing) Day" event that repurposes car parks for art, and fun activities. This began in 2005 in San Francisco.
- 'One Day Sculpture' – a pop up temporary sculpture event lasting only 24 hours. It started in Wellington and was taken to the UK.
- Gap Filler in spaces left by demolished buildings following the 2011 Christchurch earthquake.
- Letting Space – a nationwide group that employs artists to invigorate vacant private and public space under 'the Urban Dream Brokerage'. Its many projects included a Free Food Store.
- In 1982, Aro Valley residents protested by planting trees in holes they had dug in the bitumen playground of the vacant Matauranga school in Aro Street. The Wellington City Council was thereby made to honour its promise to the community to purchase the site, which become Aro Park.

=== Further reading and viewing ===
Red Mole on the Road - Sir Sam Neill, NFU https://www.youtube.com/watch?v=jzQURCYeqv4

HeartlaNZ - Jacques Cousteau, Dame Whina Cooper https://www.youtube.com/watch?v=bW6n6DCNJk8

TV News Cabbage Patch report 1978 Nga Taonga

City art legacy https://www.wakeupwander.com/destinations/wellington/vacant-lot-of-cabbages
