= Peter Roche =

Peter Roche may refer to:

- Peter Roche (politician), Irish Fine Gael politician
- Peter Roche (sculptor) (1957–2020), New Zealand sculptor
