= Pauline Rhodes =

New Zealand artist (born 1937)

- Born: 1937 (age 88–89); Christchurch, New Zealand
- Education: Ilam School of Fine Arts, Wellington Polytechnic School of Design
- Known for: Sculpture, photography, environmental art

Pauline Rhodes (born 1937) is a New Zealand artist. Rhodes is known for her artworks related to the landscape, which take two forms: outdoor works, in which she makes minimal sculptural interventions in the landscape, which exist only through her documentation, and sculptural installations in gallery spaces, which are conceptually related to the outdoor works.

== Education and travel ==
Rhodes was born in 1937 in Christchurch, New Zealand. In 1959 she attended the University of Canterbury's School of Fine Arts part-time.

In 1960 she moved to Wellington, and took the Basic Studies Art Course at the Wellington Polytechnic School of Design. In 1961 she moved to Westport and lived there until 1965.

From 1965 to 1969 Rhodes lived and travelled in Africa and Europe. She lived in Nigeria for 18 months, where she worked on terracotta sculpture, pottery, and bronze casting with a traditional bronze caster. From she 1967 lived in Kent, England and travelled around England, Wales and Scotland, returning to New Zealand by way of Greece and India.

In 1971 Rhodes enrolled part-time again at the Canterbury University School of Fine Arts, and completed her Diploma in Fine Arts (Sculpture) in 1974. She attended Teachers College in 1976 and taught part-time briefly, but stopped to focus full-time on her art practice.

== Work ==
While at art school in the 1970s Rhodes began working outdoors, becoming one of New Zealand's few environmental sculptors.

Rhodes' work takes two main forms: sculptural installations in buildings, usually art galleries, using materials that have often been modified through exposure to the elements (such as paper stained with rusted metal), and ephemeral outdoor interventions, where contrasting coloured elements and forms (such as dyed cloth or coloured rods) are placed in the landscape, photographed by the artist, and then removed. While Rhodes has made outdoors works in New Zealand and Britain, most have taken place in Banks Peninsula, Canterbury, the area in which she lives.

Rhodes has developed her own terms for these two kinds of works, both of which she sees as being about space. 'Extensums' are usually outdoor works, which 'extend' a space in Rhodes' terms; 'intensums' are usually installations inside buildings, where space is intensifed.

Rhodes began training as a cross-country runner in 1978 and went on to compete regularly in marathon and cross-country events. In 1998 art historian Priscilla Pitts wrote:

Every day she runs long distances on the hills, often along Summit Road, 'absorbing the landforms' not just with her eyes, but also through the soles of her feet. She becomes kinetically intimate with the landscape, her whole body responding to the varying nature of the terrain. In response to this way of understanding the land, some works involve upright 'markers' across the chosen site; others construct paths from squares and strips of material; other indicate the lie of the land using a succession of long horizontal elements.

== Career ==
Although she did not have her first exhibition until 1977, Rhodes took part in exhibitions at the Artists' co-op in Wellington in 1978. Rhodes quickly established herself with projects in public galleries throughout New Zealand.

In 1980 Rhodes contributed Extensions to the Sarjeant Gallery's 4 New Zealand Sculptors exhibition (which also included Andrew Drummond, Neil Dawson and Matt Pine). Working in space under the gallery's well-known dome, Rhodes installed a floor piece made from squares of weathered steel laid out through the galleries from under the dome and extending into the grounds outside.

In 1981 as part of ANZART, the first Australia-New Zealand artist exchange initiated by Ian Hunter, Rhodes presented a work titled Stained Silences at the Robert McDougall Art Gallery. She covered a long wall in the gallery with stained squares of newspaper and gave her first slide talk on her outdoors work as part of the exhibition events programme.

In 1982 Rhodes was included with Christine Hellyar and Jacqueline Fraser in 3 Sculptors at the Museum of New Zealand Te Papa Tongarewa in Wellington. She constructed two walls of rust-stained newsprint sheets attached to lengths of cane, which formed a corridor and shook subtly when visitors passed between them. In the same year she presented an installation work, Extensums: ground runs - stained ground, at the F1 Sculpture Project, in which chalk and water marks drew attention to details in the factory floor surface, and the space was filled with large pieces of paper stained by rusting steel, upright curved grids and lime green rods.

In 1985 Rhodes exhibited in the Auckland Art Gallery's artist project series. Her installation, titled Intensums '85, filled a long gallery with a three-dimensional grid like a labyrinth, made of a wide variety of materials including steel rods, cane, green painted cane, paper, fabric, copper wire and dried beach grass, all stained with rust, and small boxes of earth which sprouted grass during the exhibition.

Rhodes took part in a number of other notable exhibitions in the 1980s and 1990s, including Content/context: a survey of recent New Zealand art (1986, organised by the National Art Gallery), Alter/Image: a different view, women artists in New Zealand 1973–1993 (1993, City Gallery Wellington and Auckland City Art Gallery), and Action replay: post-object art (1998, Artspace, Auckland) and had solo projects at a number of galleries, including Intensum/Extensum (1986, Govett-Brewster Art Gallery, Extensum – soft ground and Paper works: stained ground (1987, Artspace, Auckland), INTENSUM in memorium (1987, Wellington City Art Gallery), INTENSUM: stained silences, interconnections (1998, Govett-Brewster Art Gallery), and In-between (McDougall Contemporary Art Annex, Christchurch), and made the site-specific sculpture Ziggurat 2000 in Hagley Park, Christchurch, for the Art and Industry Biennial.

In 2003 the Adam Art Gallery in Wellington staged the exhibition Conduits and containers: Leakages from the tests, curated by Christina Barton, to accompany the publication of Barton's book on Rhodes’ work from 1977 to 2000, Ground/Work: The Art of Pauline Rhodes (2003, Victoria University Press).

Some of Rhodes' private archive and documentation of her work was destroyed in the 2011 Christchurch earthquake.

In 2014 Rhodes exhibited a new installation Cones of Possibilities and Impossibilities at The Physics Room contemporary art space in central Christchurch.

The following year, 2015, Rhodes created a site-specific, temporary outdoor artwork for the 2015 SCAPE Biennial in Christchurch. The work made use of mass-produced industrial components which were returned to the manufacturers at the end of the festival.

In early 2016 Rhodes created a site-specific installation, Dark Watch, at Auckland's ST Paul St Gallery. Critic John Hurrell compared the work to some of the artist's installations from the early 1980s, such as Extensum/Extensor at Christchurch's CSA in 1983. An accompanying publication, also titled Dark Watch, features essays by Charlotte Huddleston, Tina Barton, Ash Kilmartin and Rebecca Boswell.

== Awards and recognitions ==
In 1987 Rhodes was the first recipient of the Olivia Spencer Bower Award.

== Collections ==
Because her work is largely temporary and site-specific, few of Rhodes' works are held in public collections. One large sculptural work, Extensum/Extensor (1982) is in the collection of the Museum of New Zealand Te Papa Tongarewa: the artist stipulated that the work could only be purchased if she could personally control how it was presented in future. Both Te Papa and the Christchurch Art Gallery hold drawings by Rhodes and photographic recordings of her outdoor works.
