= Barry Thomas (artist) =

New Zealand artist

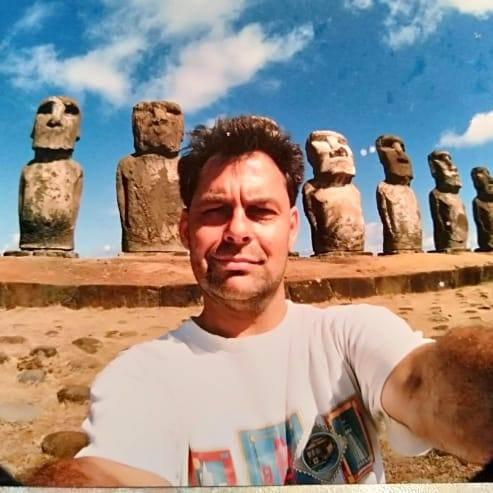
- Thomas in 1999
- Education: Ilam School of Art, Christchurch
- Known for: Film-making and activist art
- Notable work: Vacant lot of cabbages (1978)

Barry Noel Thomas is a New Zealand artist and film maker. He is known for creating 1min art films called rADz and for his activism art including in the 1970s planting cabbages in an empty building site in Wellington City.

== Biography ==
Thomas's first work experience was working on a film set when he was 16. The film was Uenuku, a Māori language drama and also working on it were many artists from Blerta (Geoff Murphy, Bruno Lawrence and Alun Bollinger). After that experience he went to the National Film Unit as a trainee cameraperson. Thomas went on to art school in the late 1970s at the Ilam School of Fine Arts in Christchurch. He was a peer of Vincent Ward and they worked together on the film A State of Siege.

In the 1970s Thomas formed The Artists' Co-op along with Eva Yuen, Ian Hunter, Terry Handscombe and Ross Boyd to "work outside the traditional areas of painting and object sculpture, in the more ephemeral realms of performance and conceptual art." This cooperative received a grant from New Zealand's Arts Council to connect a community within New Zealand and to international artists.

In 1976 Thomas had inspired protest reaction at the match of retired All Black rugby legend Fergie McCormac to which two white South African rugby players had been invited. Thomas and others intervened at this rugby match at Christchurch's Lancaster Park by using weedkiller to write "WELCOME TO RACIST GAME" on the field in 20 foot high letters, oriented directly at the TV cameras. This was five years before the civil unrest of the anti apartheid 1981 South Africa rugby tour of New Zealand.

The New Zealand Festival of the Arts in 1977 used a 'happening' by Thomas as the opening event called The Party, where guest were invited but the promised food and drinks were behind a wall of plastic. A group of guests led by fellow artist Andrew Drummond formed a faux rugby scrum and broke down the plastic after 3 minutes.

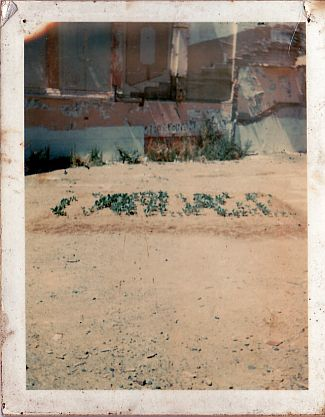
Vacant Lot of Cabbages

Thomas, on 4 January 1978, created a public intervention art, guerilla art work of art Vacant Lot of Cabbages illegally on an empty building site in Willis Street in central Wellington. It was created by bringing in soil and planting 180 cabbages that spelled the word cabbage as an urban garden. At the end of June that year the cabbages were harvested. The work attracted high profile media attention he deliberately used to challenge the public to become part of the art - he later called this "Jeter le gant". During that time the location became a central gathering space for artists and community members. At the end of the six months there was a festival called The Last Roxy Show and included a ceremonial burning of the remaining cabbages.

Thomas was one of the cinematographers that captured footage of the 1981 South Africa rugby tour protests that formed part of the 1983 documentary film Patu!

Thomas has re-drawn advertising hoardings by whiting and blacking out letters to give often humorous new meanings to the thing being advertised. He publicly sought an end to homelessness with his intervention at an art opening he called "comfort zones" and then called his own Homelessness think tank.

Thomas formed a film production company called Yeti Productions and in the 1980s and 1990s he created film, photography and largely dialogical art projects. He also created award winning commercials. A cross-over from this were art-based short clips that screened during commercial breaks. Not to sell products but to just be art. These were called rADz, 'radical art ads' or 'haiku films' and aired between 1997 and 2001. In New Zealand 100 rADz were made with many artists and filmmakers involved including: Taika Waititi, Rhys Darby, Jemaine Clement, Lala Rolls, Greg Page and Nova Paul. More were made in the UK and were presented at film festivals.

Thomas became known for canny, gentle, emancipatory, idiosyncratic, ground breaking art. "Since the 1970s he has driven art like a sharpened stake into the heart of the corporate/political beast." said Chris Trotter.

From 2006- c.2016 Thomas ran his Paint-making and painting workshops for a week each year at the Thames School of Mines for youth and adults. Participants each made their own paint from local earth pigments and painted on Raw Paper Pulp. All paintings were then collectively exhibited.

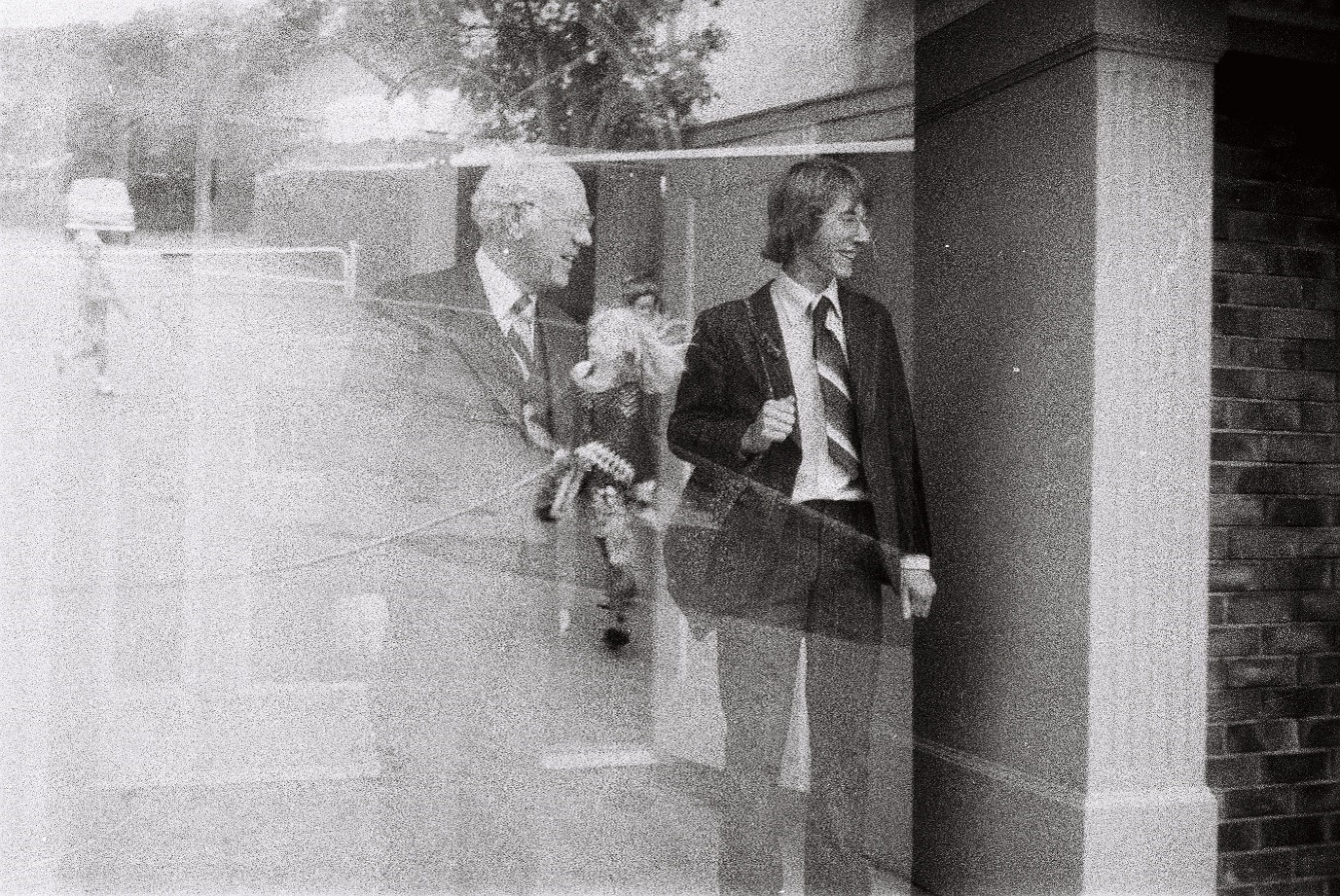
Lychgate Funeral home employees and Thomas' art students take a rope for a walk in Aro Valley 1979 including his string circle game.

Throughout his life Thomas has created String-works in which he uses rope or cotton thread to encircle and unite people. On a smaller scale, rope is tied into a circle and participants hold it leaning back, closing their eyes and waiting to feel if the circle will move clock or anticlockwise. This was first performed at the YWCA Wellington in 1979 then again in 2023 with his son Max in Kikuchi Japan. His first string-work took place during the Vacant Lot of Cabbages 1978. Thomas has also tied up a park at the 3rd Sydney Biennale 1979, encircled a street - Claremont Grove in Wellington, paid homage to Marcel Duchamp at the opening of Peripheral Relations - a Duchamp show 2012, with a string performance ("Comfort Zones") which led red-stickered gallery goers outside to a homeless man Adam Art Gallery and in 2017 in Dunedin, he used 13 km of thread to make a large circle joining the haves and have-nots - living very differently in the climate change affected, flood-prone city.

In 2012 Te Papa acquired documentation of Thomas's 1978 Vacant Lot of Cabbages art project.

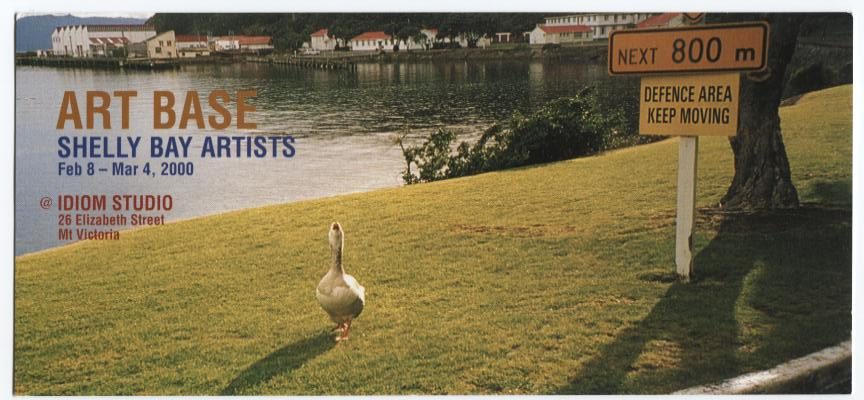
Thomas named "Art Base (inc.)" where 22 artists were housed in Shelly Bay Wellington.

== Art exhibitions ==
- Work (1978) – New Zealand Academy of Fine Art - group exhibition with The Artists' Co-op (Barry Thomas, Eva Yuen, Ian Hunter, Terry Handscombe and Ross Boyd).
- Artist's Co-op (1978-9) Several performances including: "Three handed Chess", "Wasting Time".
- 3rd Sydney Biennale (1979 Part of rebel tour of 22 uninvited NZ artists contingent performed "Advantage Server" and string-work in local park).
- Wellington Potential (1979) Young artists joint show Elva Betts Gallery
- Characters (1980) - A collection of 60 street characters' photographs by Thomas, Mark Hantler and Helen Mitchell. The show was exhibited for two weeks around a Pohutukawa tree in Parliament grounds in faux TV sets and later re-shown at Te Manawa.
- When art hits the headlines: a survey of controversial art in New Zealand (1987) – Shed 11, National Art Gallery, New Zealand – group exhibition curated by Jim and Mary Barr.
- Now See Hear (1990) City Gallery Guest speaker. Created Pataka (Fisher and Paykel fridge as Pataka food store with Te Arawa Rangi and Papa iconography). This work issued from the Duchamp art/life proximity of Māori later 'borrowed' by Ian Wedde for his infamous curatorial over-reach in the Parade exhibition; Fisher and Paykel fridge against high art of Colin McCahon's Northland Panels.
- Pataka et al review (1998) Artemis Gallery solo show curated by gallery owner Clare Matheson.
- Thomas- Youle joint show (999) (Thomas' Pataka shown) Pātaka Museum of Arts and Cultures
- Art Base (2000) Idiom Studio Gallery with several other Shelly Bay Art Base artists.
- Old and New (2006) Hauraki House (review - 30 years of art and film - rADz to dirt. (Barry Brickle bought "Furies creek lovescape")
- Divested Interest - body to suit (2007) Hauraki House Joint show with Evelyn Siegrist-Huang
- Divested Interest (2007) -The Depot Artspace (Michael Smither bought "Market forces in the shadow of the long black and white cloud"
- Hellman Lapels Hellen Medlyn (2007) large Lapels sculpture commission.
- Old New Borrow Blues (2009) - (review) Thistle Hall.
- Skinscapes - (May 2010) Framework Gallery Paraparaumu, Thomas' Frowns series with other artists.
- Artists as Activists: Environment (2010) – New Zealand Academy of Fine Arts – group exhibition (Don Binney, Dean Buchanan, Nick Dryden, Ian Hamlin, Sam Mahon, Euan McDougall, Rosemary Mortimer, Michael O'Donnell, Michael Smither, Grahame Sydney, Barry Thomas, Brian Turner and Jane Zusters)
- Peripheral Relations - Adam Art Gallery (2012) Performed Comfort Zones string-work at opening of exhibition
- Art and Revolution Exhibitor/speaker Dunedin School of Art (2017) Want Mart ("personal eye in the hurricane of greed" Kennedy Warne)
- Jeetji Dowse Art Museum - (2026) Ans Westra image from Vacant Lot of Cabbages

== Film ==
- HeartlanNZ – documentary sponsored by the Department of Conservation
- Sho 1 - including Thomas' definition of art
- Selection of Thomas' films https://www.youtube.com/channel/UCQhhuUcG0xrv2QUuZCtqzig/videos
- Lada Samara - "Nothing but car" Gold Axis award - best Car Commercial 1992 Directed, Produced, Edited by Thomas https://www.youtube.com/watch?v=11H34wPLM00
