= Stephen Bambury =

New Zealand painter (born 1951)

- Born: 1951 (age 74–75); Christchurch
- Occupation: painter

Stephen Bambury (born 1951) is a Christchurch-born, Auckland-based abstract painter.

== Career ==
After graduating from the Elam School of Fine Art at the University of Auckland, Bambury received two Queen Elizabeth II Arts Council Grants and a residency at Victoria College, in Melbourne, Australia. Bambury was the first recipient of the Moët & Chandon Fellowship in 1989, leading Bambury to travel to France, where he was based for the next three years.

Initially Bambury showed with the Petar/James Gallery as its youngest artist and later was to have a long-running relationship with Andrew Jensen, whose gallery hosted a number of exhibitions featuring Bambury. His abstract oils have "no decorative, naturalistic, metaphoric or autobiographical references or intents"

He is widely held in public art museums in New Zealand, with Te Papa having 15 pieces and correspondence, Auckland Art Gallery having 12 pieces and Christchurch Art Gallery 3 pieces.
