= Susan Holmes (fabric artist) =

New Zealand fabric artist

- Born: Susan Holmes; 1941 (age 84–85); Auckland, New Zealand
- Occupation: Fabric Artist

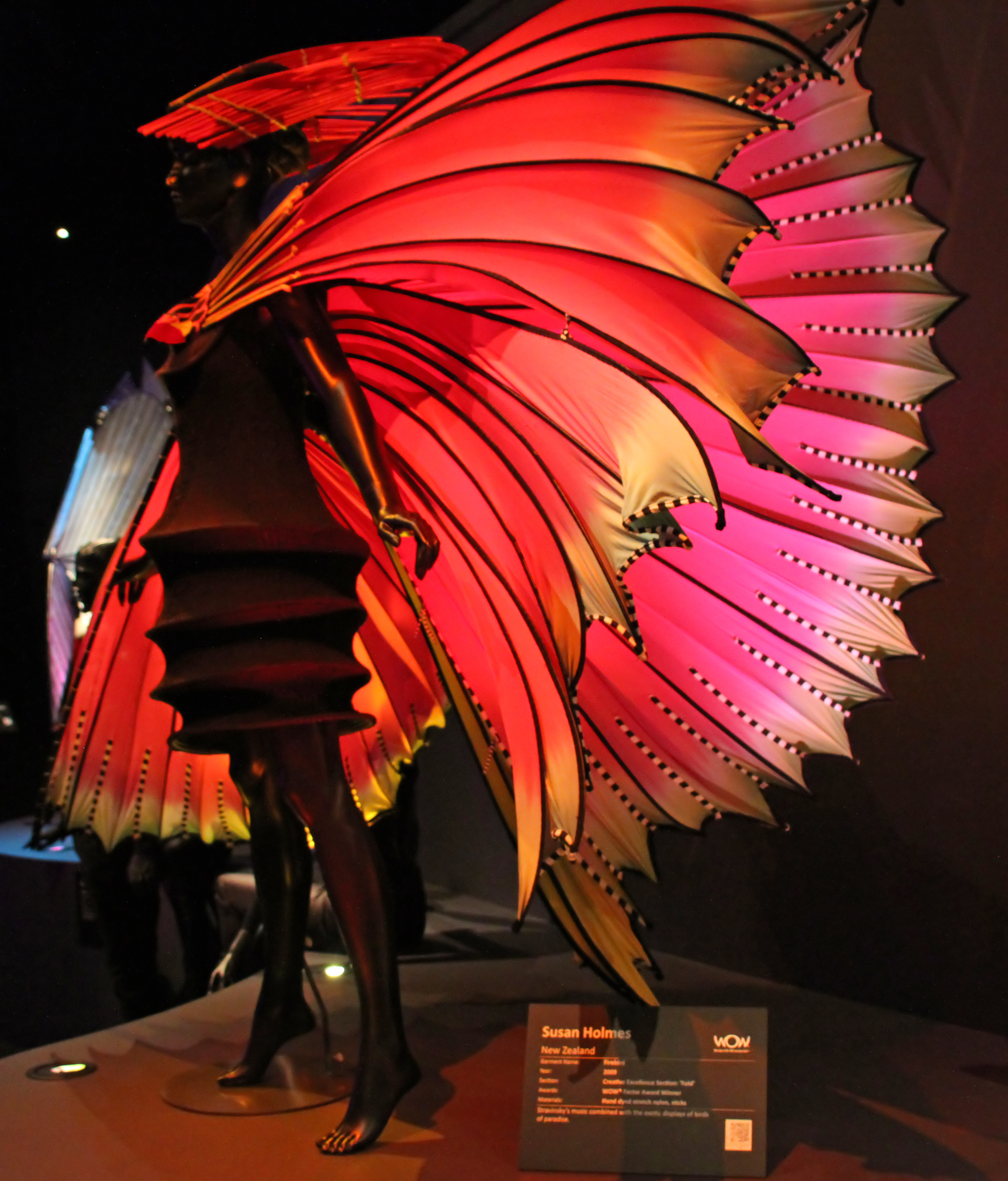

Susan Holmes (born 1941) is a New Zealand fabric artist. She is known for her 'fantasy-inspired' wearable art pieces and use of stencilling and silk dyeing. She has won 19 World of Wearable Arts awards.

== Early life ==
Holmes was born in Auckland in 1941. In 1961 she studied a home science degree at Otago University and lectured there for two years following her graduation. After this she travelled abroad through Europe and Asia. These experiences influenced her methods of dying and printing, after witnessing block-printing in Afghanistan and silk-dyeing in India.

== Career ==
Holmes first sold her printed clothing through the Trina J Boutique in Auckland. Her first prints were onto 'Indian style' voile shirts.

In 1971, Holmes began to make and sell fabric through Brown's Mill, a craft co-op in Auckland. This market operated on Saturday mornings before this was considered acceptable in New Zealand. It was known as a place for independent artists and alternative fashion. The fabric and clothes Holmes sold were all hand-dyed and she experimented with using potatoes to produce the prints. She spent twelve years at the co-op.

Holmes first entered her designs into the Benson and Hedges fashion awards in 1974, winning the 'fantasy award' in 1978. This was a significant event in Holmes' career as it marked her transition from wearable fashion into wearable arts. Her first entry to the World of WearableArt was in 1988.

Holmes established a broad repertoire of fabric art skills over four decades. Largely self-taught, she created a unique stencilling too which she called her cloud technique. In theory, it is a simple technique, used to cover up printing errors, but the subtlety of the outcome underlines the mastery, as neither the clouds or the errors stand out in the finished garment.

In the 90s she designed costumes for the television shows Hercules: The Legendary Journeys and Greenstone while continuing to enter wearable arts competitions.

In 2002, Prime Minister Helen Clark wore her design Crest of a Wave on the catwalk at the World of Wearable Arts Awards.

In 2016, Auckland applied arts and design gallery Objectspace held a retrospective of her work and published a book alongside the exhibition.

== Awards and recognition ==
1978, 'Fantasy Award' Benson and Hedges Fashion Award.

1988, Winner in Evening section, Mohair Awards, New Zealand

1991, Runner Up for ‘The Great New Zealand Cloak’ Competition (for ‘Wild Places Cloak’) Compendium Gallery, Auckland

1993, Winner Silk Section: New Zealand Wearable Art Awards. Runner up to Supreme Award.

1994, Winner Wool Section 1994 New Zealand Wearable Art Awards

Highly Commended in Pacific Paradise Section, 1994 New Zealand Wearable Art Awards.

1995, 'Highly Commended' in silk section, Nelson Wearable Arts. (Magic Feather Dress)

Finalist in ‘Visual Symphony’ Section, 1995 New Zealand Wearable Art Awards.

1996, 'Supreme Award', Nelson Wearable Arts (Dragon Fish)

1998, Winner 1998 New Zealand Wearable Art Awards, Transformation Section

1999, Highly Commended for Silk Section, 1999 New Zealand Wearable Art Awards

2001, Finalist in 2001 World of WearableArt Illumination Section.

2003, 'Highly Commended' in Kimono section, World of Wearable Arts Awards (Blue Lagoon)

2004, 'Creative New Zealand Artistic Excellence Award' World of Wearable Arts Awards (Miro Personage)

2005, "Highly Commended' in Creative New Zealand Artistic Excellence Award' World of Werable Arts (Cage of Thorns)

2006, WOW CentrePort Shape It Section winner for ‘Fluroessence’

2006, Winner 2006 New Zealand Wearable Art Awards Shape It Section ~ ‘Spots and Stripes’

2008, Winner 2008 New Zealand Wearable Art Awards: Avant Garde Section

2009, Winner 2009 New Zealand Wearable Art Awards: WOW Factor Award

2010, Invited Guest Artist, New Zealand Wearable Art Awards

=== Exhibitions ===
2013, Off The Wall: WearableArt Up Close, Auckland War Memorial Museum.

2016–2017, Susan Holmes:Fabric Artist, Objectspace.
