= Jeanne Macaskill =

New Zealand painter (1931–2014)

Jeanne Macaskill MNZM
- Born: Jeanne Bensemann; 12 November 1931; Motueka, New Zealand
- Died: 9 November 2014 (aged 82); Wellington, New Zealand
- Known for: Painting

Jeanne Macaskill, MNZM (née Bensemann, 12 November 1931 – 9 November 2014) was a New Zealand artist.

== Biography ==
Born in Motueka in 1931, Macaskill studied at Victoria University College, and teachers' colleges in Wellington and Dunedin. She trained as an art advisor with Gordon Tovey and worked for the Department of Education in both Auckland and Wellington. Arriving in London in February 1955, she studied full-time for five years at Chelsea School of Art, gaining a Diploma of Fine Art and a National Diploma in Design. She was for a time an assistant to sculptor Henry Moore. She married Australian sculptor Neil Stocker in London in 1963, and the couple had two children. Following her husband's death in 1969, she returned to New Zealand in 1972 to live in Wellington, where she remained resident for the rest of her life.

In Wellington she married Patrick Macaskill, a noted educationalist. His death in 1994 inspired her painting Cascade.

At the 1996 general election Macaskill was a list candidate for the Labour Party. She was ranked at number 52 on the party's list and consequently was not elected. She served as a member of the council of the New Zealand Academy of Fine Arts, including four years as vice-president.

In the 2004 New Year Honours, Macaskill was appointed a Member of the New Zealand Order of Merit for services to the arts and the community. In 2009 she received the Governor-General Art Award and became a Fellow of the New Zealand Academy of Fine Arts.

Macaskill died in Wellington in 2014.
