= F1 Sculpture Project =

Installation, performance and video art

The F1 Sculpture Project was five weeks of installation, performance and video art held in Wellington, New Zealand in 1982. F1 was a Conceptual art event that extended sculpture into temporary, multi-part, mixed-media, performance, environmental, intervention art, placing importance on the ideas rather than the objects being created.

== Background ==
Designed to "address the lack of support and increase exposure for sculptors", the project was initiated by Ian Hunter, an Irish-born artist and gallery professional who lived in New Zealand between 1970 and 1984. Hunter worked with the Artists' Co-op (April 1978 – 1980) which held several events and exhibitions, the F1 Sculpture Project (1982) and ANZART, a New Zealand-Australian artist event held in Christchurch in 1981, Hobart in 1983 and Auckland in 1985.

The Wellington F1 Sculpture Project was implemented by a group of New Zealand artists, including David Mealing, Stuart Griffiths, Barbara Strathdee, Mary Louise Brown and Vivian Lynn.

== About ==
The event took place in a disused factory space (hence "F1"), the Teal Lemonade Factory, on Tory Street in the central city. The project had four parts:

- presentations of works by over 100 sculptors from New Zealand, Britain and Australia
- workshops which included then-experimental visual art media including dance, video, sound and audio-visual works
- lectures, seminars and panel discussions
- performances, jazz concerts, film and slide presentations.

F1 ran from 8 November to 2 December 1982 and was supported by the New Zealand Sculpture Council, QE II Arts Council and the National Art Gallery (now the Museum of New Zealand Te Papa Tongarewa).

In an account of New Zealand performance art between 1970 and 1985, art historian Jennifer Hay described F1 as "a major event and unqualified success in building a premise with which future artists could expand", by pooling resources and time. Exhibiting artists included Greer Twiss, Don Driver, Pauline Rhodes, Peter Roche, Linda Buis, Stuart Griffiths, Jacqueline Fraser, Andrew Drummond, John Cousins, Jack Body, Chris Cree-Brown, Colleen Anstey and Paul Butt.

Hay also notes that the event "provided the opportunity to debate feminist issues in the arts and to address the problem of invisibility for women artists." A two-day seminar was held on women's sculpture and a "discussion of feminist goals" saw the establishment of the National Women Artist's Association. In an article in Art New Zealand, artist and event co-organiser Barbara Strathdee documented works presented at F1 by women artists including Kate Coolahan, Pauline Rhodes, Jacqueline Fraser, Di Ffrench, Mary Louise Brown, Colleen Anstey, and Vivian Lynn, visiting Irish artist Rose Ann McCreery and Canadian artist Evelyn Roth.

The archives of the F1 Sculpture Project are held in the Museum of New Zealand Te Papa Tongarewa.
