= Ian Hunter (curator) =

Irish artist and art curator (1947–2023)

Ian Andrew Hunter (21 July 1947 – 26 February 2023) was a Northern Irish artist, art curator and cultural advocate who worked in New Zealand and England.

== Early life ==
Hunter was born in Derry, Northern Ireland, on 21 July 1947. His family moved to Belfast in 1962, where he attended Ulster College of Art from 1965 to 1969, and then he studied Leeds College of Art from 1969 to 1970.

== New Zealand ==
In late 1970, Hunter travelled to New Zealand to take up a teaching position at Victoria University of Wellington. A year later, he was appointed education officer at the National Art Gallery in Wellington and went on to become curator of painting and sculpture. For a brief period, he was the National Art Gallery's acting director before the appointment of Luit Bieringa in 1979. In 1981, Hunter was visiting lecturer in art theory at the School of Fine Arts, University of Canterbury.

Hunter became a naturalised New Zealand citizen in 1978.

=== Artists' Co-op ===
In 1978, Hunter co-founded the Artists' Co-op in Wellington with Barry Thomas, Ross Boyd, Terrence Handscombe, Eva Yuen, Stuart Porter, Gerard Crewdson, Mark Hantler, Gaylene Preston and others. The co-op presented exhibitions and performances by Hunter, Yuen, Thomas, Pauline Rhodes, Andrew Drummond, David Mealing and free jazz groups. The Co-op is seen as an incubator group which embraced artists from the Wide Mouthed Frogs to Sam Hunt and Garry McCormic, Last Sundays and A Month of Sundays: Ian Wedde, Lindsay Rabbitt, Marion McLeod, Bob Orr, Dyllis Rheese, Brian King, Stuart Porter, Jennifer Shennan, MarkHantler and Gary Henderson and groups like Hackett and Living Force plus Aucklanders: Peter Roche and Linda Buis and David Mealing.

=== Academy of fine arts ===
In late 1978 Ian Hunter, Barry Thomas, Eva Yuen, Ross Boyd and Terrence Handscombe had an exhibition entitled "Work" at the Academy of fine arts Wellington based around their Artists' co-op.

=== 3rd Sydney Biennale ===
In April and May 1979 Ian Hunter organised a contingent of Twenty two Artists' co-op and other NZ artists to travel to and participate in the 3rd. Sydney Biennale. This was an uninvited "rebel tour" that enabled the radical New Zealand artists' participation with QE2 Arts Council air fare subsidies.

=== ANZART ===
In 1981, Hunter initiated the idea of ANZART, which was to be an ongoing cultural dialogue between Australian and New Zealand artists. The organisation of the first trans-Tasman exchange in Christchurch was influenced by the inclusion of just two New Zealanders in the 1979 Biennale of Sydney. Hunter saw this as an "imbalance" he was keen to remedy. Hunter always intended ANZART to have an ongoing commitment to sharing cultural developments and a further edition was held in Tasmania in 1983. In 1984, the idea was extended to Edinburgh where it accompanied the major Colin McCahon exhibition I Will Need Words curated by Wystan Curnow at the Talbot-Rice Gallery at the University of Edinburgh. In 1985, ANZART was presented in Auckland.

=== F1 New Zealand Sculpture Project ===
Buoyed by the success of ANZART 1, in 1982 Hunter organised F1 New Zealand sculpture Project in a disused Thomson Lewis drinks factory (now Moore Wilson's) in Wellington's Te Aro district. Running from 8 November to 2 December 1982, it presented installations, forums, film evenings, performances, seminars and a 'Grand Spaghetti Banquet'. Artists involved included Juliet Batten, Mary-Louise Browne, Andrew Drummond, Stuart Griffiths, Peter Roche, Linda Buis, Vivian Lynn, David Mealing, Nicholas Spill and Barbara Strathdee. The Scottish art dealer Richard Demarco, who later showed New Zealand artists in Edinburgh and supported ANZART 3, also attended.

=== Return to United Kingdom ===
Hunter moved to London in 1983 and was arts officer at the National Council for Civil Liberties until 1984 when he moved to Rossendale in Lancashire. In 1992, Hunter completed a practice-based PhD from Manchester Metropolitan University. Hunter became increasingly involved with rural England and acted as cultural policy consultant to the Rural Cultural Forum alongside free-lance consultancy work.

=== Kurt Schwitters' Merzbarn ===
In 1990, Hunter and his partner Celia Larner founded the Littoral Arts Trust with Hunter as artistic director. The trust was formed to respond to social, environmental, and economic change and to protect the civic status of the Lake District-based Merzbarn that the German artist Kurt Schwitters had used as a studio. Hunter set up the 'Kurt Schwitters in England' working party in 2000 to raise funds so the Littoral Arts Trust could purchase the land and buildings surrounding the Merzbarn. In 2007, Hunter and Larner took over the stewardship of the barn and five years later, as Littoral Arts Trust, purchased the site. Hunter was appointed visiting research fellow at the University of Cumbria in 2015 to work with the university in developing "the full potential of the Merzbarn" and its surroundings. In 2018, Hunter and Larner were forced to put the land and Schwitters' Merzbarn up for sale.

=== Death ===
Hunter died at Cylinders in Ambleside on 26 February 2023.
