= Tao Wells =

New Zealand artist

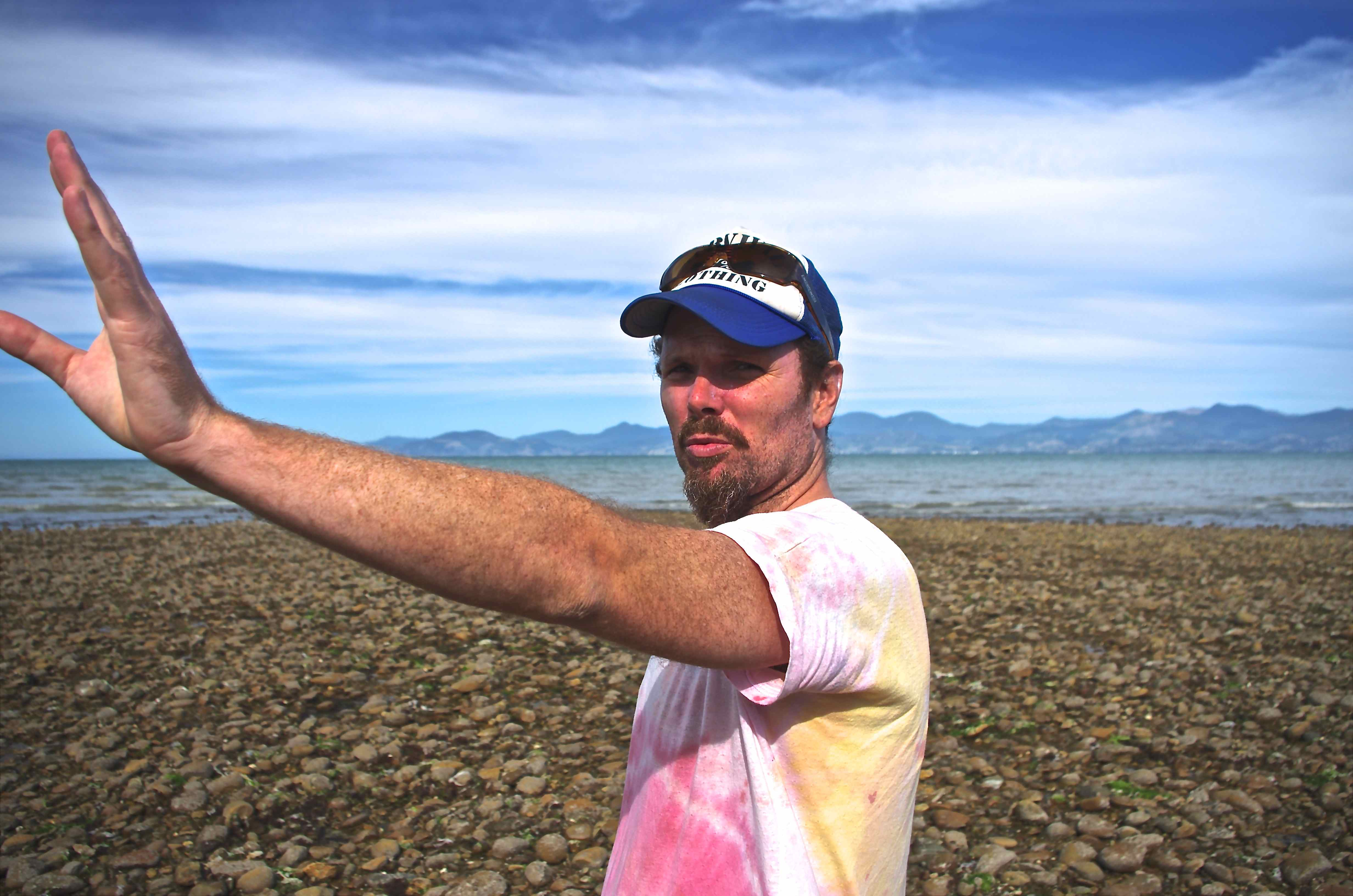
Photo of Tao Wells, taken at Ruby Bay, Nelson, New Zealand

Tao Wells is a New Zealand artist and a voluntary community conceptualist, whose work is known for its critiques of established systems of power and value.

== Works ==
In 2000 Wells was asked to join up with the original three founders of Enjoy Gallery, at 174 Cuba St, Wellington.

In 2002 after the original three founders of Enjoy left the gallery, Wells added "Public" to the galleries name, making it "Enjoy Public Art Gallery". He also coined the phrase "Liberated from commercial constraint" to reflect the public funding from Creative New Zealand, he helped the gallery to receive. The gallery kept this name and phrase for 18 years and has enjoyed over a million dollars of public funding.

In 2007, Wells became the only non Auckland based member of the influential artist run gallery, Gambia Castle.

In 2009, Wells was given, legendary contemporary art dealer, Peter McLeavey's 500th show, in his gallery at 147 Cuba St, Wellington.

Wells' 2010 work the "Beneficiary's Office" was managed by his creation of a 'Public Public Relations' organization called "Wells Group". The performance was part of a larger series of temporary projects curated by Letting Space in Wellington. The "Beneficiary's Office" was controversial in its promotion of the opportunities and benefits of unemployment in an effort to criticize the contemporary abuse of work and working.

"We need to work less, so we consume less. The average carbon footprint of the unemployed person is about half of those earning over $100,000", "We should never be forced to take a job. If you're forced to take a job it's a punishment. If a job is a punishment then all we are building as a society, is a prison".

"I believe that, the true artists of our times, are the politicians and PR companies and the Lobby groups, that are creating the frames, for how we interpret reality."

The initial media coverage incorrectly reported that he received funding of $40,000 for the art project. Creative New Zealand released a clarification, stating that the total amount for Wells' show was actually $3,500. As a result of the media coverage, he had his benefit cancelled by Work and Income, with Wells and a welfare advocate questioning the illegality of WINZ's decision, it was reinstated.

American writer Chris Kraus compared the Wells Group project with the concerns of French philosopher Simone Weil and the Italian NO WORK "Movement of 77'.

"What you did Tao, I thought, was incredibly courageous and profound... To be both dependent on that system and to so publicly expose the issues around that system was very brave... to be a public beneficiary that's about as bad as it gets. "

Writing by Wells has appeared numerous times in the magazine White Fungus.

In 2018, Easier – a 72 glossy retrospective of his work – was published by the Govett-Brewster International Art Gallery featuring an essay on his practice by Chris Kraus. The publication looks at thirty years of Tao's involvement in contemporary art. And makes a strong argument for Artists that work for Universities to promote their works sponsorship, and stop flooding the market with their subsidised but not indicated, not independent, work.

In her book Social Practices(Semiotext(e) Active Agent Series, 2018) Kraus revisits Wells' work and praises it, "Wells reads deep into all the games surrounding cultural and economic life... he endeavors to put on the table all the business conducted underneath the table, exposing it to public view.” In a review of that work, Brooklyn Rail highlights the central role of Wells' practice, describing it as illustrating "how bound activism and art have become, doing what traditional activists' tactics alone could not."

== Personal life ==
He lives in Dunedin, New Zealand, with his two children after a period based in Nelson.
