= Peter Roche (sculptor) =

New Zealand sculptor (1957–2020)

- Born: 1957; Auckland, New Zealand
- Died: July 2020 (aged 62–63)
- Citizenship: New Zealander
- Education: Elam School of Fine Arts, University of Auckland
- Occupations: Performance artist Sculptor

Peter Roche (1957 – July 2020) was a New Zealand performance artist. He initially focused on bodily disfigurement and later, with partner Linda Buis, performances that tested social conventions and human relationships. In the mid-1980s he turned to sculpture producing mechanical and light-based sculptural installations.

== Early years ==
Born in Auckland in 1957, Peter Roche attended the Elam School of Fine Arts. In 1978, while still at art school, Roche staged a series of performances involving his body that highlighted political issues and often involved self-harm. Early examples were Meat Lift Suspension Piece that involved dropping a sheep carcass into the Waitemata Harbour from a small airplane and Transformation in which Roche had sheep kidneys sewn onto his naked body. When Roche performed an endurance piece during which he hanged himself from a tree in the Auckland Domain, the art school publicly removed itself from any association with his work. Despite these reactions to his extreme performances, Roche graduated with a Bachelor of Fine Arts in 1979. In 1979 Roche was invited to participate in the Third Biennale of Sydney in the side event (Side F/X). His performance took place in the Marist Brothers School Building and art critic and writer Wystan Curnow described it in detail: ‘in the course of ninety minutes the performer cut himself with razor blades, stuck needles into himself, slit open an ox tongue and tied each half to the sides of his head, gave himself an emetic, threw up, gave himself an enema...’

== Working with Linda Buis ==
In his last year of art school Roche also began performing with his partner Linda Buis the daughter of the Auckland photographer Simon Buis. The two artists, both with part-time jobs, lived together in Grafton along with Buis's eight-year-old son. At first they had no long-term plans of collaboration but they found, as Roche describes, that working together constantly they ‘developed further and further an involvement in what might be termed the social and psychological conditions of relationship.’ Their performance work went on to reflect on the stresses in inter-personal relationships and audience's reactions to them. As Roche described it, 'When we are doing a work it is more a question of looking at relationships from a sociological point of view. It is a continual learning process.' In March 1980, having presented four performances together, they formally announced the partnership at the photography gallery Real Pictures. In association with the announcement, Roche and Buis also re-presented two of their performances Liaison Assertive Cooperative and Street Piece via video and a sequence of photographs. Two years later, Roche described their working method, 'In some ways our presence in performance can be seen as a prototype, and yet there is also the fact that our audience is never simply an observer, but is made keenly aware of the fact that it too holds an effective relationship with the work in progress.' All the Buis / Roche performances were recorded by either video or still photography and these images have become the record of the work. In some performances the videos of previous works were incorporated. Much of the photography was done by two of Roche's friends, artists Gregory Burke and Ron Brownson.

In 1984 Roche and Buis traveled to Europe presenting performances in London and at ANZART in Portsmouth. Writing in the magazine Splash they commented of their European trip, ‘The term Performance Art has lost its magic for us. We are finding it too exclusive, and it would seem that too often in the past we have restricted our activities in order that they could be seen in a performance context.’ 1984 also saw the end of the Roche / Buis performances with Roche going on to focus on sculpture. During a partnership that lasted just over five years the two had presented 25 unique performances.

== Selected performances with Linda Buis ==
1979 You are Invited to be Accepted. Although a solo performance by Roche, it is notable for the first appearance of Buis. She appears with Roche in a photo pinned to the wall in the room in which Roche had isolated himself for two days to complete his performance. The photo of Roach bandaged and bleeding in front of this double portrait was taken by Buis.

1979 Get The Fuck Out, Got To Get Out, Auckland University. One of the first performances by Roche and Buis was a one-hour 'improvisation with a continual changing of acceptance and rejection of roles and identities.’

1979 Oh Shit No, On The Contrary, Grafton Arts Centre, Auckland. The performance included a looped film showing Buis being ‘slapped in the face, while she and Roche made comments about each other (one present in person and one on tape).’ This work was repeated at the RKS gallery along with Buis and Roche ‘repetitively raising a hand in a frustrated gesture of greeting.’

1980 Street Piece (with Linda Buis). Performed in Queen Street Auckland. Buis and Roche ‘separately and repeatedly crisscrossed the busy road.’

1980 Auckland Festival Liaison Real Pictures Buis and Roche stood on opposite sides of a camera which ‘the person facing the camera walked up to it and turned it 180 degrees to focus on the other person in the distance, who then repeated the sequence.’ Roche and Buis also made a clothed version homage of the Marina Abramovic—Ulay doorway piece in which members of the audience had to squeeze between the bodies of the two performers to enter the room. Roche and Buis were able to see a live performance by Abramovic and Ulay in Christchurch at ANZART in 1981.

1980 Museum Piece, Auckland Domain. Around 3AM Roche and Buis walked through the Auckland Domain circling the Auckland War Memorial Museum. The Domain was well known as potentially dangerous at night and throughout their walk they took photographs every twenty minutes with the flash of their cameras acting as a signal of their presence to ‘potential aggressors’. The original photographs were later reprinted as a standalone artwork for Te Papa Tongarewa. Buis and Roche described the work, ‘We are walking for an indefinite period of time in a large circle around the base of the museum. We are moving in the same direction. We are documenting at twenty minute intervals our positions relative to each other within this given space activity area’

1981 Eighth Sculpture Triennial, Mildura.

1981 ANZART Robert McDougall Art Gallery and Art Centre, Christchurch.

1981 Night Piece, old Auckland Gas Works. As Roche worked his way through the abandoned building lighting candles, Buis crawled for 1½-hours ‘cautiously on her stomach along the top of an 18 metre high wall.’

1982 Oh Shit No, On The Contrary, RKS Gallery, Auckland. Reworking a previous performance a film loop of Buis being slapped in the face by Roche was played as they both made comments about each other, one of them in person and the other via tape.

1983 Performance RKS Gallery, Auckland.

1983 ANZART in Hobart, Australia Roche and Buis, dressed in white knelt opposite to one another and repeatedly bent forward to touch heads and then for an hour remained still with their heads touching.

1984 Performance, Old Synagogue, Auckland.

1985 ANZART in Auckland.

1985 Conversations and interviews, RKS Gallery, Auckland. This exhibition of drawings by Roche and Buis and sculptures signaled Roche's move away from performance to sculpture and was probably their last joint exhibition. Roche and Buis described the works as ‘metaphors for emotion’ while art writer Pitts talks of 'ear piercing noises and the threat of exposed wiring. Audience responses and unease were still part of the mix.'

== Sculpture career ==
By late 1985 Roche's partnership with Buis came to an end and he focused on sculpture, apart from a brief return to performing in 1996. The work created in his studio in Point Chevalier foregrounded the use of light and mechanics and were often seen as threatening. He was also involved in at least two large commissioned works: Coral at the Vero Building in Central Auckland, an 8 by 2 meter light sculpture attached to the side of the building and in 2008 Saddleblaze a large light installation installed at the Gibbs Farm. In 2009 the Auckland Council commissioned Roche to produce Twister, a 20 metre high ‘tornado-shaped sculpture made of steel tubing and neon lighting.’ However, after a number of years, the project was cancelled. Roche also participated in a number of International art festivals including the Australian Sculpture Triennial, with Linda Buis (Melbourne, 1981), the Paris Biennale (1982) and the first Gwangju Biennale (1995) in Korea.

== Selected exhibitions ==
1985 ANZART Auckland ’85 — A trans Tasman artists’ exchange.

1988 Peter Roche 3 Kinetic Drawings — 33 1/3 Gallery Wellington. Large drawings and assemblages.

1988 Dome Installation — Sarjeant Gallery, Whanganui.

1988 Drawing Analogies (group) — City Gallery Wellington. catalogue here.

1989 Star Art Auckland.

1989 Exhibition 1 (group) — 33 1/3 Gallery, Wellington.

1989 Peter Roche: Solarsphere (Window Work) — Auckland Art Gallery.

1990 Peter Roche: Trophies and Emblems — ArtSpace Auckland (toured). The Director of Artspace at the time Priscilla Pitts described entering the exhibition, ‘His Male and Female Sentries were positioned just inside the entrance to the gallery and everyone who walked past set off ear-splitting alarm bells, unexpected and loud enough to trigger a heart attack’. Catalogue here.

1993 Stephen Bambury and Peter Roche — New Work Studio Wellington

1995 Peter Roche: Tribal Fictions — Fisher Gallery (now Te Tuhi) Auckland. Catalogue here

1996 White Fright — Teststrip Auckland.

1996 Peter Roche and David Townsend — Fiat Lux Gallery, Auckland. Roche's performance included cutting the wheelie bin belonging to the shop next door in half with a chainsaw.

1996 Performance — Ambassador, Auckland. Roche working with neon tubes and a chainsaw.

1996 Tribal Fictions — Fisher Gallery, Auckland (toured).

1998 Peter Roche: Conduit — New Gallery: Auckland Art Gallery. Art writer William McAloon described the exhibition as, ‘Looking as much like a temple as a prison chamber, Conduit is at once transfixing and disconcerting. Extending from the centre of its space in three radiating arms, the work creates a passage of light through the viewer may pass.’

2002 Action Replay: Post-Script — ArtSpace and Govett-Brewster Art Gallery (group)

2006 Good Company Flash Lights (group) — Bath Street Gallery, Auckland.

2012 Cinema — Peter Roche, Saatchi & Saatchi.

2014 RendeRED: An exhibition of works from The James Wallace Arts Trust (group) — Basement Theatre, Auckland. Curated by Tim Vickers.

2014 Peter Roche Futures and Ruins — Ironbank, Auckland.

2015 Peter Roche Antechamber — The Basement Theatre, Auckland 23 June 2015.

2016 Peter Roche SILO 6 Auckland. (John Hurrell Roche's Silo Installation EyeContact 21 October 2016) Roche's installation in the interiors of the six concrete silos at Wynyard Quarter's Silo Park was part of Auckland's Artweek.

== Final days and recognition ==
In July 2020 Roche died of lung cancer. In 2023 the Adam Art Gallery presented the exhibition Peter Roche Linda Buis: In Relation: Performance works (1979-1985), co-curated by Christina Barton and Gregory Burke. The exhibition set out to show how ‘Roche & Buis focused on ‘interaction’ as a means to explore physical and psychological vulnerability, both in connection to each other and in relationship to the viewer.’ The following year Night Piece, a documentary film by Bridget Sutherland (Faraway Films, 2023) examined the performance work Roche did with Buis as well as his sculpture. It was premiered at the 2024 New Zealand International Film Festival.

== Collections ==
Te Papa Tongarewa

Auckland Art Gallery

Chartwell Collection
