= Andrew Drummond (artist) =

New Zealand artist (born 1951)

- Born: 1951 (age 74–75); Nelson, New Zealand
- Education: University of Waterloo, Canada
- Awards: New Zealand Order of Merit 2007

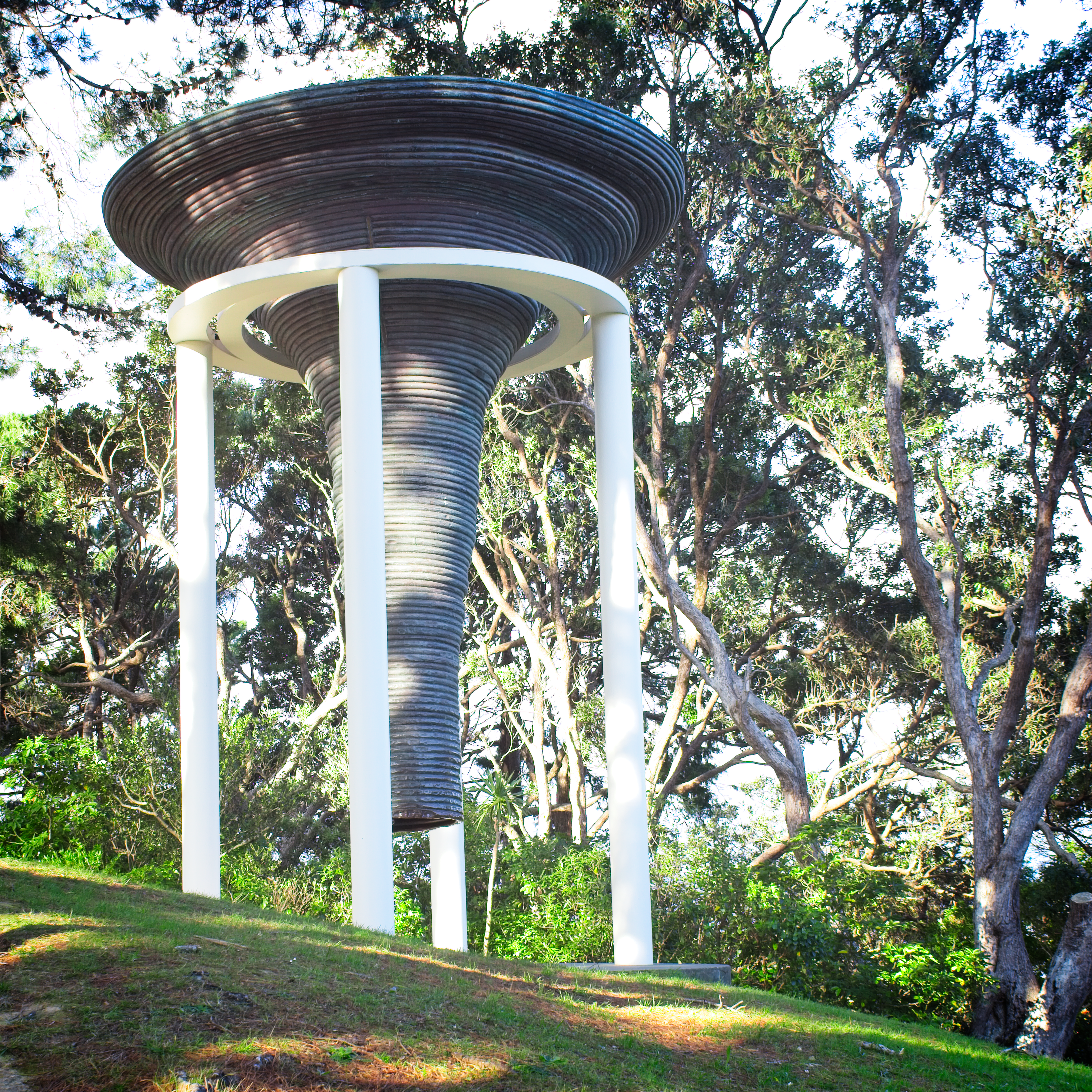
* Listening and Viewing Device Andrew Drummond

Andrew Drummond (born 1951 in Nelson, New Zealand) is a New Zealand painter and sculptor. He attended University of Waterloo in Canada, graduating in 1976. He was a Frances Hodgkins Fellow in 1980.

== Career ==
Drummond tends to focus on process and ritual while contemplating ideas of location. He considers the entanglements of the human body, ecology, and dislocated histories within the landscapes of New Zealand. In the 1970s, he created several documented performance works. Drummond lives and works in Christchurch, New Zealand. He earned his degree in Fine Arts from the University of Waterloo, Canada, and later became a lecturer in sculpture at the University of Canterbury, School of Fine Arts. He is represented by Jonathan Smart gallery in Christchurch, Page Blackie gallery in Wellington and Antoinette Godkin gallery in Auckland.

== Honours and awards ==
In 2007, Drummond was awarded the New Zealand Order of Merit for services to sculpture

Drummond has received the following awards:

- 1999 Creative New Zealand Grant for Projects Environment commission
- 1995 Creative New Zealand Grant for Robert McDougall Art Gallery commission
- 1990 Australia, New Zealand Foundation Fellowship
- 1987 Tylee Cottage Residency
- 1981 Major Grant, QEII Arts Council
- 1980 Frances Hodgkins Fellowship, University of Otago, Dunedin

== Works ==
Drummond works with a variety of media and materials. His work includes process-based installation, photography, figurative and symbolic imagery. Drummond was included in a number of early exhibitions that featured performance art in New Zealand including ANZART initiated by Ian Hunter in 1981 and the F1 New Zealand Sculpture Project in 1982.

He had an exhibition at the Wellington City Gallery in 1981 titled Andrew Drummond: Works 80.

== Public sculpture and commissions ==
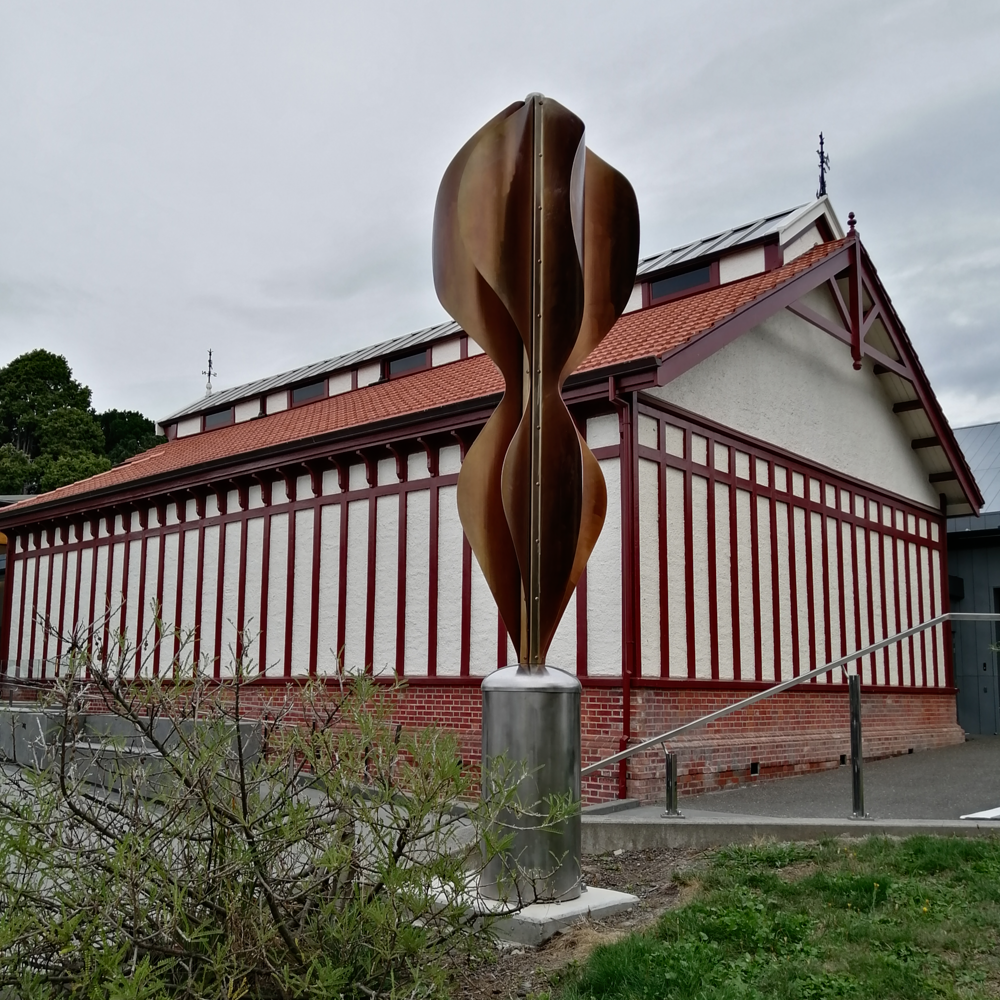
Ramarama, Andrew Drummond

Drummond has received many commissions for both private and public sculptures.

- 2016/17 Ramarama, Suter Gallery, Nelson
- 2014/15 Armillary for Air, private commission, Ohinetahi, Governors Bay, Canterbury
- 2011/12 Rotating Sphere, private commission, South Canterbury, NZ
- 2007 Vertical Form, Counter Rotating, private commission, Nelson
- 2006 Vertical Form, Counter Rotating, private commission, Banks Peninsula
- 2005 Tower of Light, Wellington Sculpture Trust commission for Meridian Energy Wind Project
- 2004 Cascade, commission for Woollaston Estates, Nelson
- 2004 for Swinging and Spinning, private commission, Geraldine, Canterbury
- 2000 Assignation Device, commission by Kiwi Properties for Veto Building, Auckland
- 1999 Crossroads, commission by Projects Environment for ArtBarns: After Kurt Schwitters
- 1995 for Beating and Breathing, commission for Robert McDougall Art Gallery, Christchurch
- 1994 Device for Listening & Viewing, Wellington Sculpture Trust commission, Botanic Garden, Wellington
- 1990 Stationary Limbs, commission for the Fletcher Trust Collection, Fletcher Challenge House, Auckland

== Selected exhibitions ==
2010

- Andrew Drummond: Observation / Action / Reflection Christchurch Art Gallery. Drummond’s first full survey exhibition of works from 1980 to 2010 curated by Jennifer Hay.

2008

- Wunderbox Christchurch Art Gallery (group).
- Mostly Harmless: A Performance Series Govett-Brewster Art Gallery, New Plymouth (group). ( Now Showing: A History of the Govett-Brewster Art Gallery eds Christina Barton, Wystan Curnow and Jonathan Bywater Gobvett-Brewster Art Gallery 2016 ISBN 978-0-908848-74-4 )

2000

- Intervention: Post Object and Performance Art in 1970 and Beyond Robert McDougall Art Gallery (now Christchurch Art Gallery) - Contemporary Art Annex (group) The exhibition was curated by Jennifer Hay.

1998

- Action Replay: Post Object Art Artspace, Auckland and the Govett-Brewster Art Gallery. (group) The exhibition was curated by Christina Barton, Wystan Curnow, John Hurrell and Robert Leonard.
- Dream Collectors, Museum of New Zealand Te Papa Tongarewa, Wellington. Curated by Ian Wedde and John Walsh (group).

1995

- Andrew Drummond: for beating and breathing Christchurch Art Gallery Annex, Christchurch.

1994

- Art Now: The First Biennial of Contemporary Art National Art Gallery Wellington. (group) The exhibition was curated by Christina Barton.

1992

- Between Rocks and Glass Houses City Gallery, Wellington. With architect Noel Lane. Curator Gregory Burke noted in the catalogue that, 'Their installation focuses on the social and environmental considerations of architecture and highlights an interaction between the organic nature of building materials and the symbolic potential of building structures’.

1991

- Crosscurrents, Contemporary Australian and New Art, Waikato Art Museum, Hamilton (group).

1990

- Supports for Falling Limbs and Articles for an Ongoing Nature, Queensland Art Gallery, Brisbane, Australia.

1989

- Constructed Intimacies Moët & Chandon and New Zealand Arts Foundation tour (group).
- Andrew Drummond: Images from Another Archaeology Auckland City Art Gallery, Auckland.
- Putting the Land on the Map: Art and Cartography in New Zealand Since 1840, Govett-Brewster Art Gallery (group) Curated by Wystan Curnow.
- Landscape and Sculpture Manchester Polytechnic. (group).

1988

- Exhibits: The Museum Display and the Encyclopedia Plate, National Art Gallery, Wellington (group).
- Action Replay held by the Govett-Brewster Art Gallery, New Plymouth and Artspace, Auckland in 1988 (group).

1987

- Drawing Analogies Wellington City Art Gallery (group) The exhibition was curated by Greg Burke.
- When Art Hits the Headlines, Shed II, National Art Gallery, Wellington (group).
- Five Sights, Vessels and Containers, Braided Rivers, Dunedin Public Art Gallery.

1985

- Sentinel, Dunedin Public Art Gallery, Dunedin.

1982

- F1 New Zealand Sculpture Project, Wellington (group).
- New Zealand Drawing; Dunedin Public Art Gallery, Dunedin (group).

1981

- 1st Australian Sculpture Biennial, La Trobe University, Melbourne, Australia.
- Works 80 City Gallery, Wellington. Drummond installed nine living willow trees in the gallery along with videos of willows in the wild.

1978

- Platforms~An Exhibition of 15 Dimensional Structures by New Zealand Artists, COCA Christchurch Arts Festival, Christchurch.
- New Zealand Sculptors at Mildura, national tour organised by Queen Elizabeth II Arts Councill of New Zealand.

1977

- Young Contemporaries Exhibition 1977 Auckland Art Gallery. (group) Drummond presented the installation and performed Onto Skin, a Performance in Three Parts.

== Controversy ==
As part of the Canterbury Society of Arts 1978 festival Platforms, Drummond performed Crucifixion. He was fixed to a diagonally shaped cross while a latex skin was created on his naked body, once formed the skin was shed from his body and he left the stage. Drummond wore a gas mask throughout to protect himself from the ammonia generated by the drying latex, he was also connected to an ECG machine so observers could monitor his emotional state. For the duration of the festival the discarded latex skin was laid out on the cross and exhibited with Polaroid photographs taken during the performance by artist Paul Johns plus other detritus from the performance.

Two people in the audience took offence at the nudity and reported the performance to the police. The police laid charges (under Section 3(d) of the Police Offences Act.), when eventually heard in court the behaviour was found to be 'ill-mannered, in bad taste, crude and offensive', but the charges were dismissed.

== See also ==
- List of University of Waterloo people
