= Chartwell Collection =

Art works collection

The Chartwell Collection is made up of over 2000 contemporary art works purchased by the Chartwell Trust and currently on long-term loan to the Auckland Art Gallery Toi o Tāmaki as part of the Chartwell Project.

== History ==
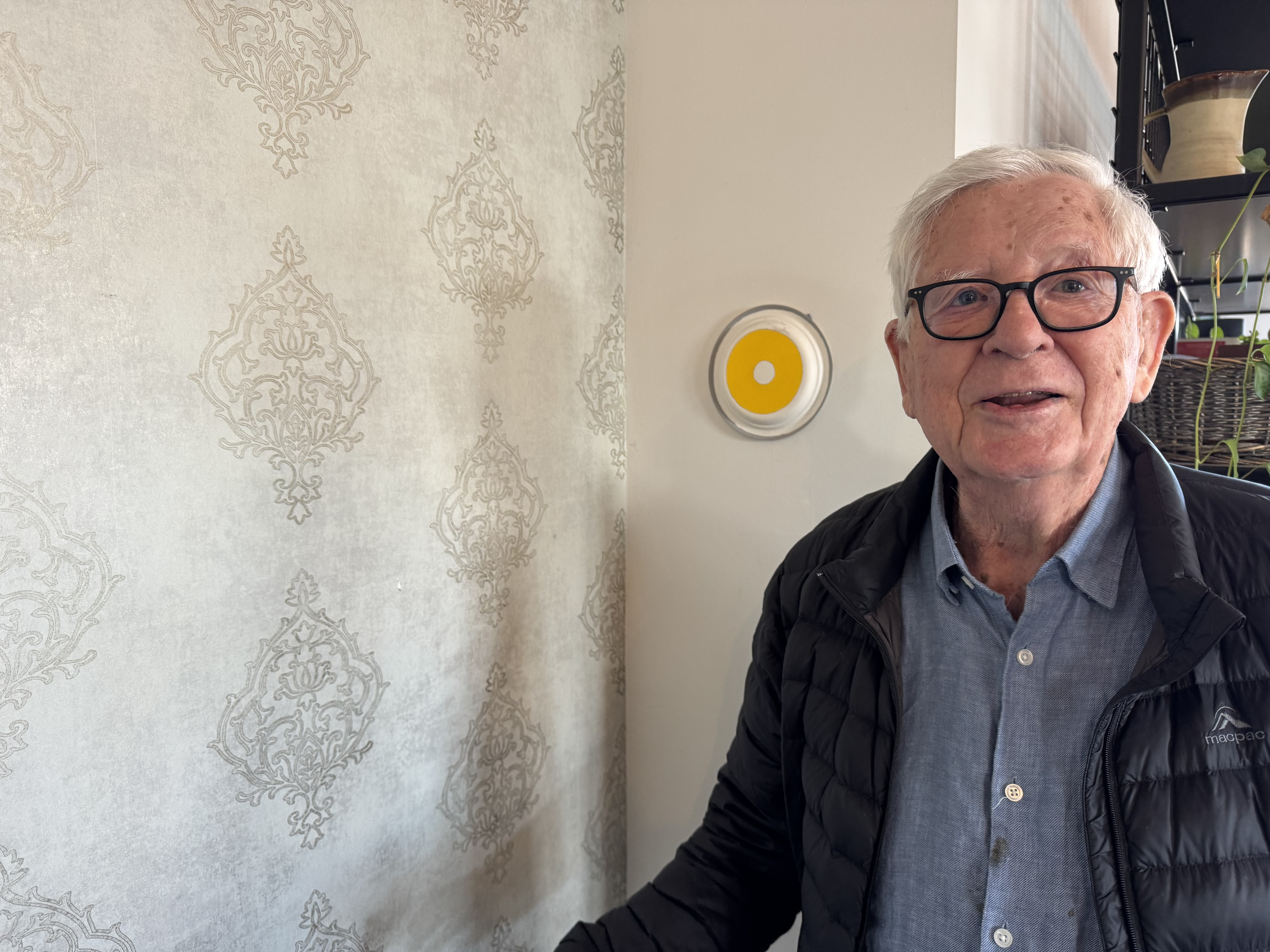
Rob Gardiner, June 2026

In 1970, the Chartwell Trust was founded by accountant Rob Gardiner with the central aim of providing a contemporary art gallery for the city of Hamilton, New Zealand. The Foundation was also intended to promote arts, culture, heritage, community development, education, training, research, as well as the environment and conservation within New Zealand.

The first major acquisition for what became the Chartwell Collection was W A Sutton’s Threshold VIII 1973 purchased in March 1974.

== Centre for Contemporary Art ==
In 1982 the Trust purchased the Hamilton Hotel at 186 Victoria Street next door to the Waikato Art Museum and converted it into the Centre for Contemporary Art. Initially the Centre was used to store the collection but quickly began to present a regular exhibition programme.

From 1985, the Centre held bi-annual exhibitions from the Chartwell Collection often focused on recent acquisitions. By 1987 there were nearly 500 works in the Collection with an increasing focus on Australian artists. Rob Gardiner hoped this would demonstrate the changing nature of Australian art and, “…reflect an interest in the interaction of European with the Aboriginal painter’s vision…” along with giving an “opportunity to explore the similarities, differences and interchange between New Zealand and Australian work.” The Centre was closed in 1994.

== Waikato Museum of Art and History ==
In 1993, the Chartwell Collection was placed on long-term loan to the Waikato Museum of Art and History. In 1996, however, the Trust announced it was going to relocate the collection to the Auckland Art Gallery in response to a management restructure at the Museum.

== Auckland Art Gallery Toi o Tāmaki ==
The transfer of the Chartwell Collection to the Auckland Art Gallery began In 1997. In the following years the Gallery has often used the collection in combination with its own holdings and regularly features the Chartwell Collection with stand-alone exhibitions. By 2022 there had been 16 exhibitions dedicated to the Chartwell Collection. The most recent Walls to Live Inside / Rooms to Own opened at the Auckland Art Gallery Toi o Tāmaki September 2022.

== Collecting ==
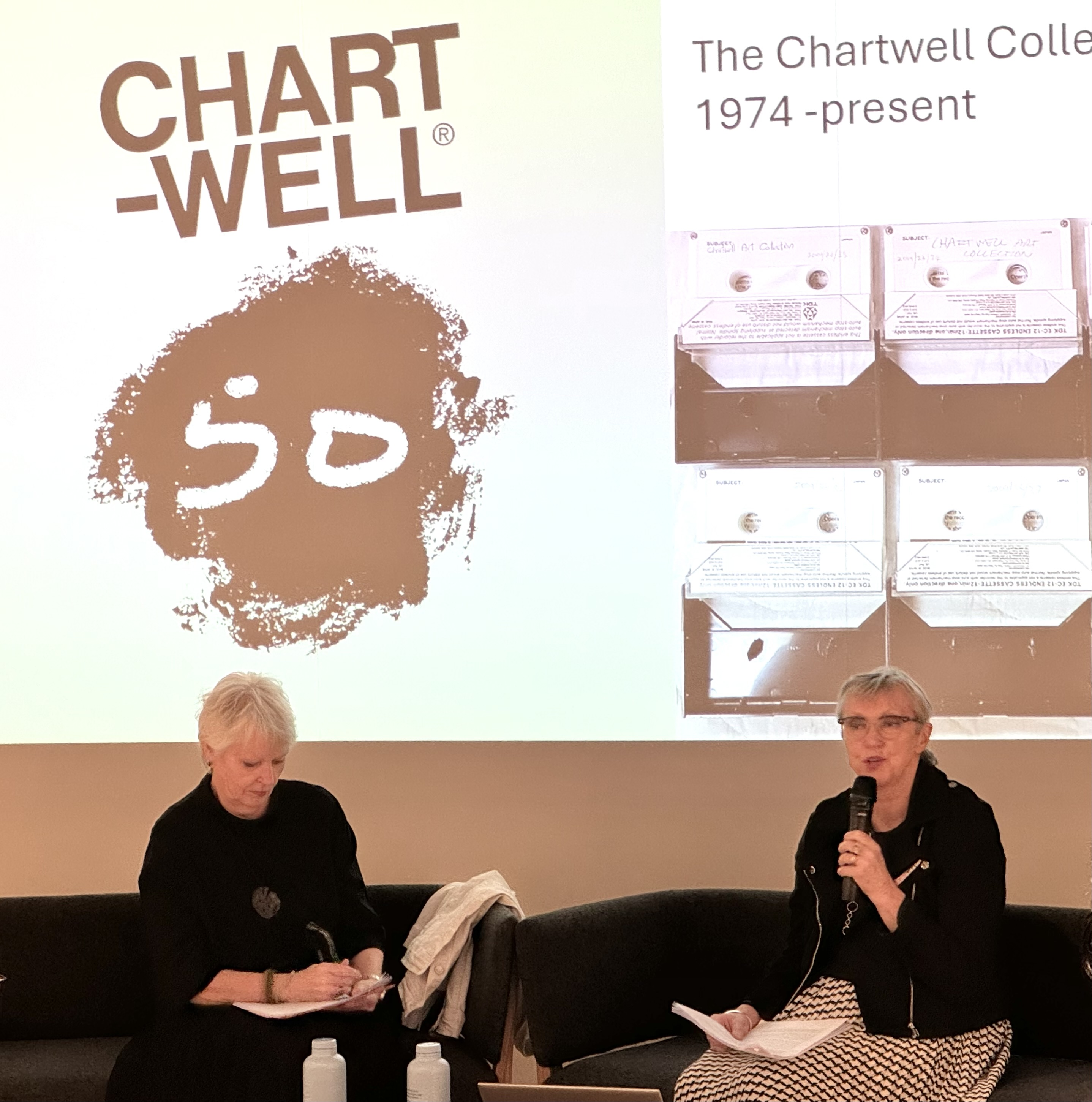
Karen and Sue Gardiner, who continue the work started by their father Rob, talking at Te Papa at the 50th Anniversary exhibition Generation X, 2024

By the end of 2022 the Chartwell Collection had close to 2100 items on long-term loan to the Auckland Art Gallery Toi o Tāmaki. The two organisations have worked closely together and at times have made joint purchases such as Giovanni Intra’s Untilted (Studded Suit) 1990 in 2003 and in 2009 Michael Parekowhai’s The Indefinite Article 1990.

Works to be included in the Chartwell Collection were initially selected by Rob Gardiner who was later joined in the process by his daughter Sue Gardiner, and often with advice from the curators at the Auckland Art Gallery Toi o Tāmaki. Sue Gardiner acknowledged that, "…there's a big difference between a public collection and a private one. A work for a public collection needs to work in a gallery and within the collection to reveal the power of the artwork".

Some collection highlights include Colin McCahon’s Are There Not Twelve Hours of Daylight 1970, Shane Cotton’s 1996 painting Cross, Peter Robinson’s Boy am I Scared Eh! 1997, Julian Dashper’s Cass Altarpiece 1986, the 1978 Staircase Night Triptych by Philip Clairmont, Riverbank with Bathers and Shadows by Arthur Boyd, et al’s O Studies 2001, Run Off 2000 by Eve Armstrong, Kate Newby’s I’m so Ready 2009, Dumb Waiter 2009 by Alicia Frankovich, Brown Sloth Creature 2005 by Francis Upritchard and Campbell Patterson’s 8 videos Lifting My Mother for as Long as I can 2006-2013.
