= Lett Thomas =

Gallery in New Zealand

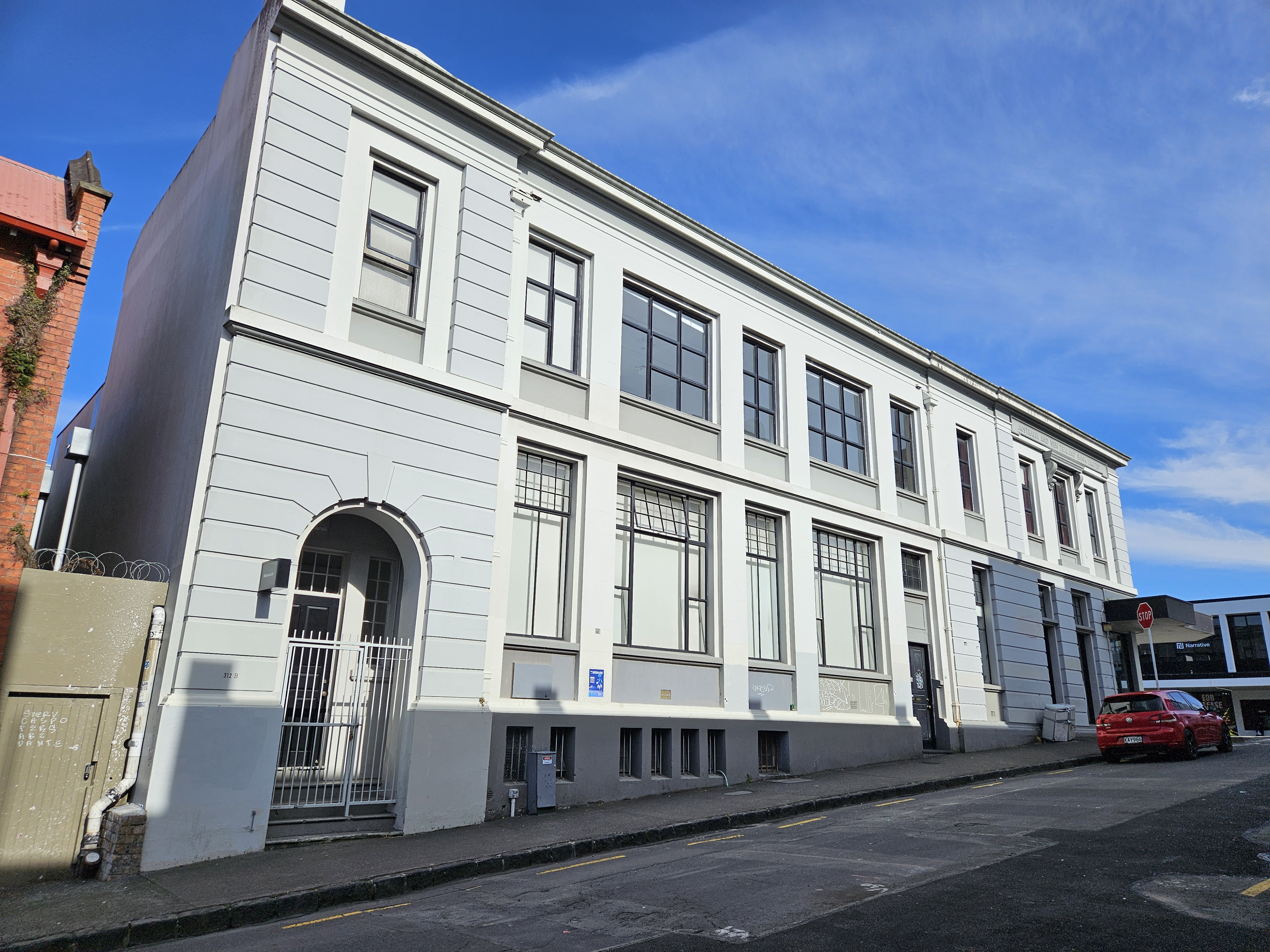
- Lett Thomas Karangahape Road
- Established: 2003
- Location: 312 Karangahape Road
- Coordinates: 36.8581°S 174.7577°E
- Type: Contemporary art dealer gallery
- Website: lett-thomas.com

Lett Thomas (formerly known as Michael Lett) is a gallery dealing in contemporary art that operates in Auckland, New Zealand. The gallery was established by Michael Lett in 2003 and since 2015 he has been joined by co-director and part owner Andrew Thomas.

== History ==
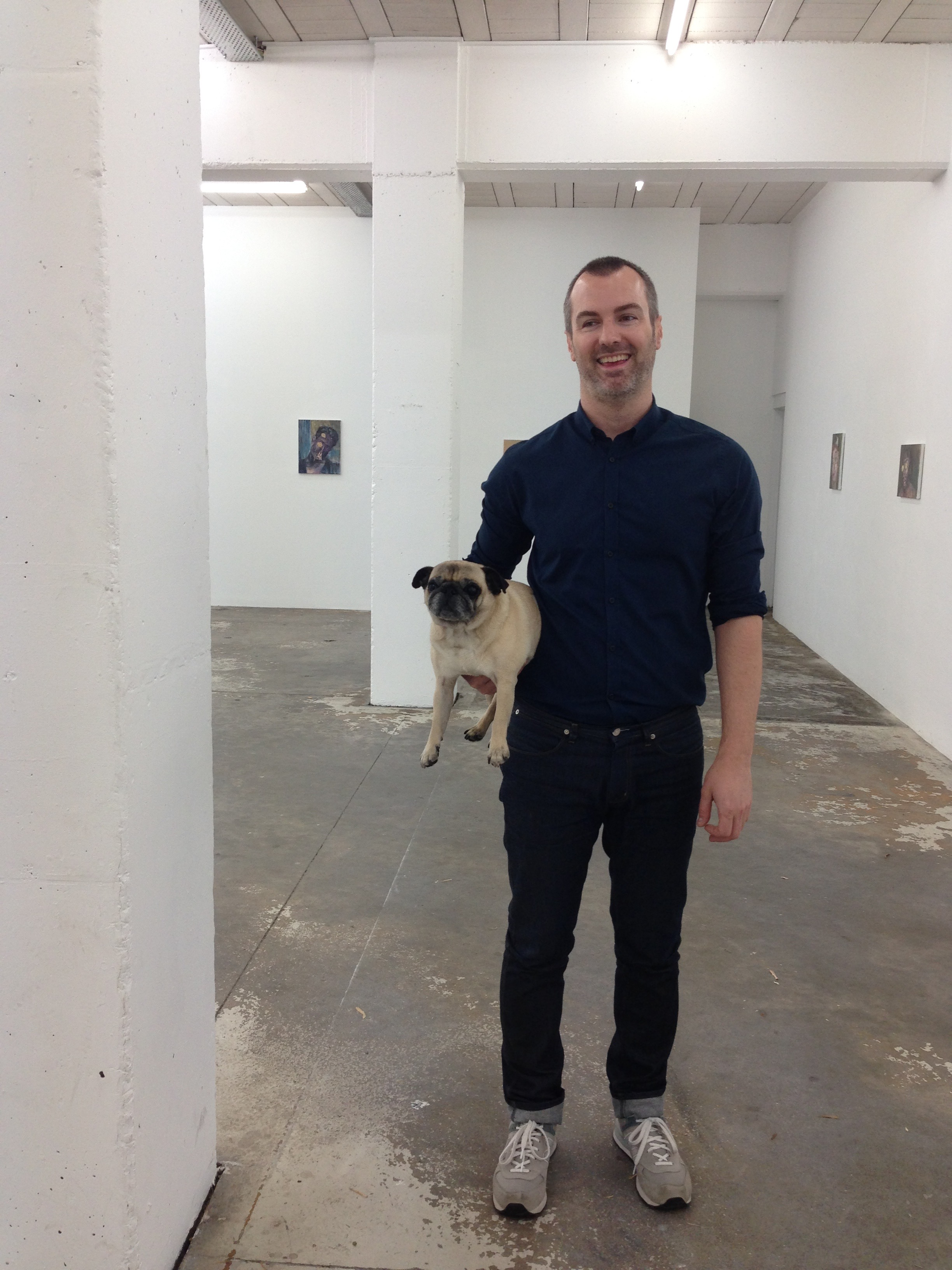
Michael Lett at the Great North Road site, 2013

Michael Lett opened his eponymous gallery in a ground floor space on the corner of Karangahape Road and Edinburgh Street, Auckland in 2003. Lett had previously worked for art dealers Anna Bibby and Sue Crockford and was with the Gow Langsford Gallery when he decided to open his own business. The gallery was initially founded in partnership with the artist Michael Parekōwhai and opened with Dive an exhibition by Steve Carr. The second exhibition Views of Space with the Australian artist Hany Armanious gave some indication of the breadth of artists Lett intended to pursue. From 2008 to 2011 Lett was assisted by Sarah Hopkinson who has described Michael Lett as a place to see, ‘…serious exhibitions by serious artists.’ Hopkinson, after leaving Michael Lett would go on to develop her own gallery presence in Auckland, at Costal Signs. Lett has attracted other assistants who have gone on to make their own mark in the visual arts including Ryan Moore now director of his own gallery Fine Arts Sydney and Becky Hemus editor of Art News and The Art Paper.

Michael Lett remained on Karangahape Road until 2011 when it moved to a large space on the Great North Road. Art critic John Hurrell described the first exhibition trans-cryption by the artist collective et al. as, ‘an exciting exhibition to explore….’ and ‘a useful way of getting acquainted with Lett’s new space’. Andrew Thomas, who had previously worked with Hamish McKay in Wellington and White Cube in London, joined the gallery and later becomes partner and co-owner. The increased space allowed the gallery to offer artists the opportunity to show large scale works and installations not possible in the more restricted Karangahape Road site for example the combined exhibition of Michael Parekōwhai and et al. in collaboration with Anya Henis and Samuel Holloway in 2013 and Michael Stevenson’s installation Proof of the Devil in 2013. The gallery returned to Karangahape Road in 2014 siting itself on the bottom floor of an old bank building on the corner of East Street. Since March 2026 the gallery has been renamed as Lett Thomas.

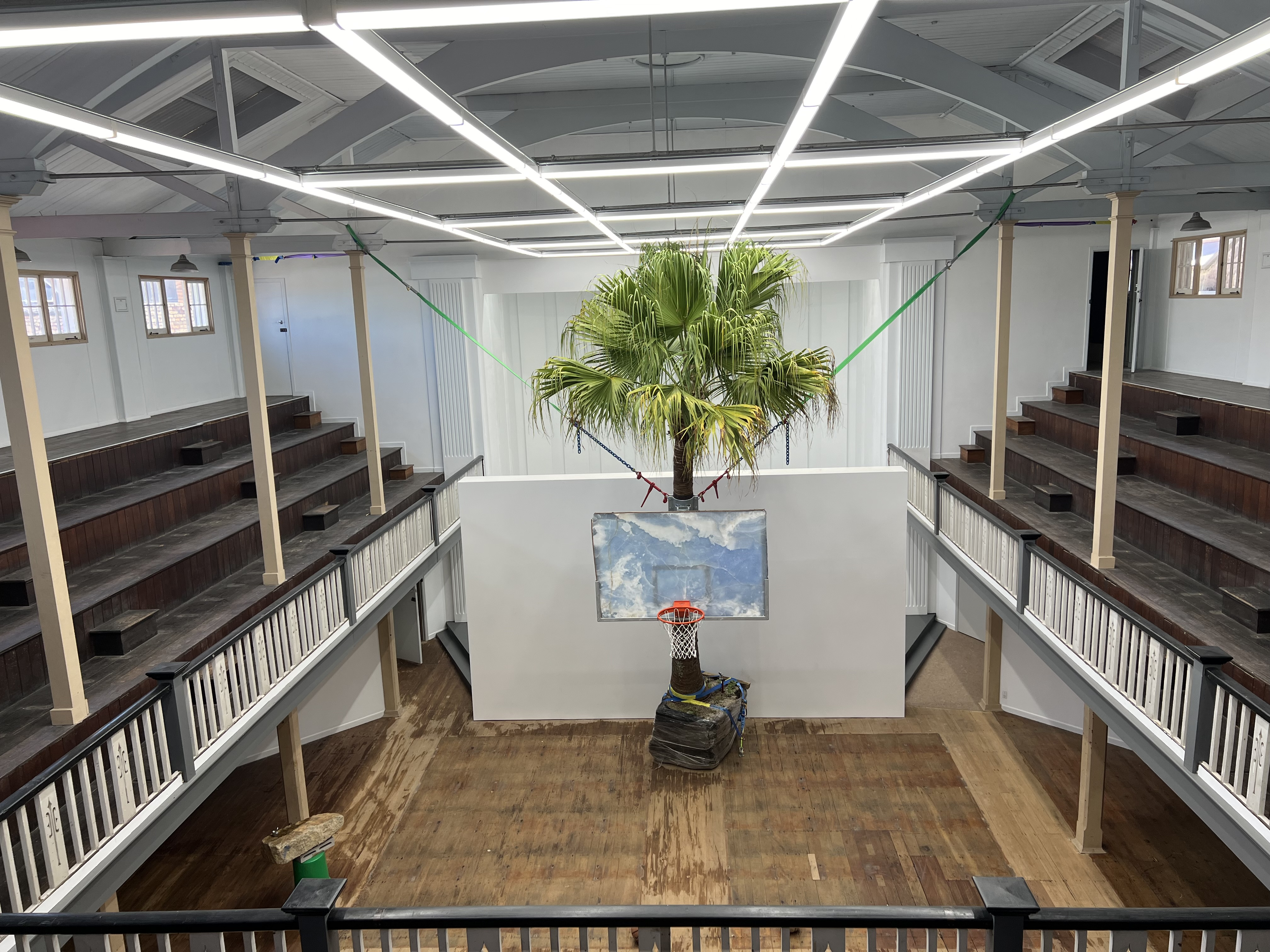
Mike Hewson installation 'Fountains' at East Street, 2024

=== East Street ===
In 2022 the gallery took over a hall next door to use as a project space. The Methodist Mission Hall had been opened in 1909 and designed by Alexander Wiseman. Early projects have included a recreation of Jim Allen’s performance Poetry for Chainsaws, Michael Stevenson’s installation Waiting for the Other Shoe to Drop, Seating Proposal for a Grant Maker, and Kate Newby's installation Had Us Running With You.

== Artists ==
The current list of artists (2024) represented by Michael Lett are:

Anouska Akel	et al.	Séraphine Pick
Jim Allen	Richard Frater	Ian Scott
Hany Armanious	Gavin Hipkins	Sriwhana Spong
Dan Arps	Zac Langdon-Pole	Michael Stevenson
Steve Carr	Paul Lee	Peter Stichbury
Fiona Clark	Judy Millar	Imogen Taylor
Stella Corkery	Kate Newby	Kalisolate ‘Uhila
Martin Creed	Michael Parekōwhai	Cerith Wyn Evans
Julian Dashper	Campbell Patterson	
Simon Denny	Oliver Perkins	

== Exhibitions ==
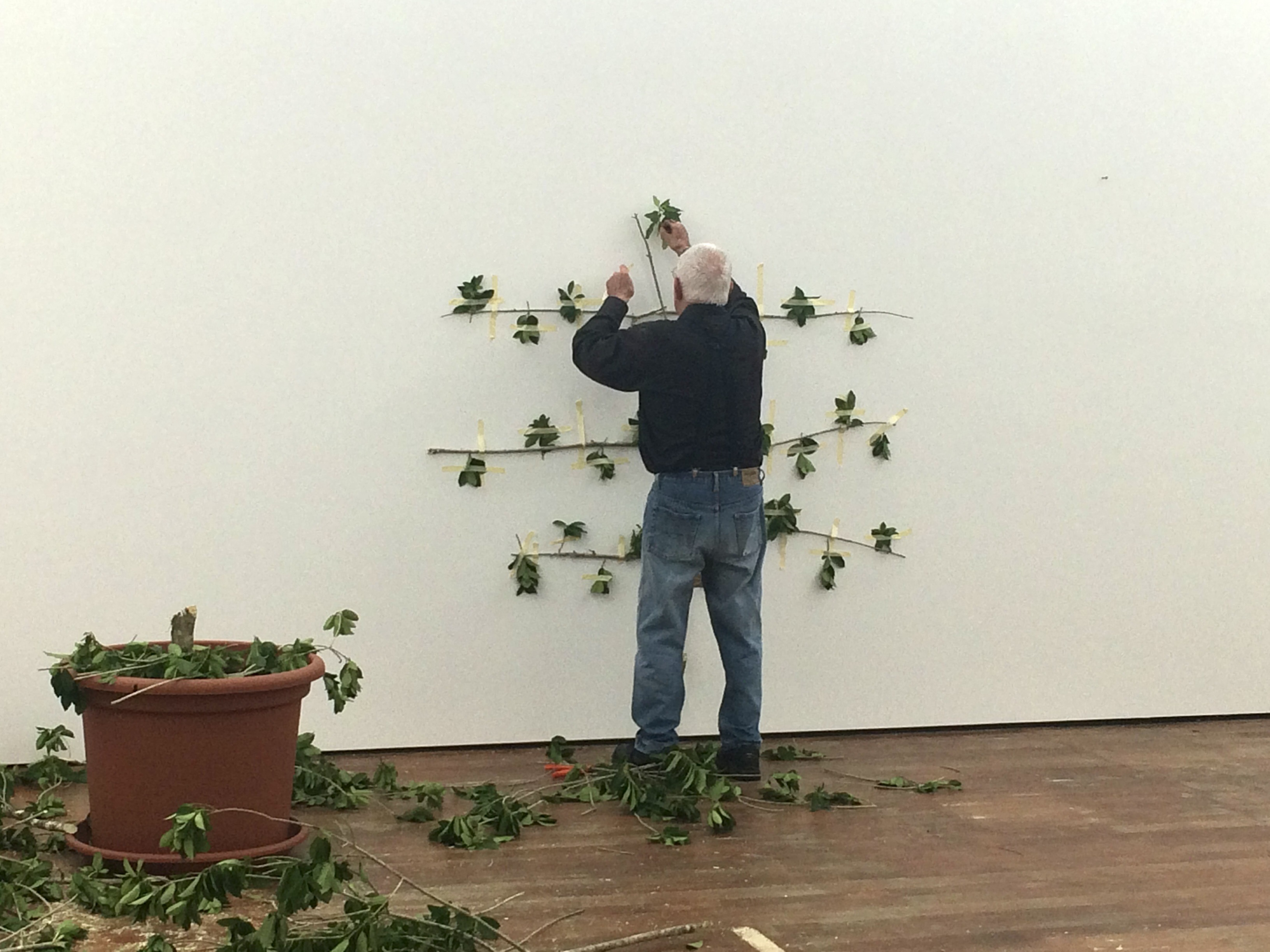
Jim Allen performance piece at the Karangahape Road gallery, 2014

From the last show of its first year of operation, Michael Parekōwhai’s Kapa Haka, five life-sized figures posing as security guards in the gallery’s street facing window, to et al.’s 2023 installation I am the Direct Source of Truth that introduced itself with a waste paper bin full of bulldog clips Michael Lett has also demonstrated a strong interest in representing a wide range of work by important contemporary artists. The gallery has also shown an interest in promoting recent art history and first showed work by Jim Allen the influential teacher and artist within three years of opening. Since that time Lett has regularly featured Allen who was 83 when he first performed at the gallery. The work exhibited was a re-creation by Allen of his performance piece Poetry for Chainsaws that was first shown in 1976 at the Experimental Art Foundation in Adelaide, Australia. Since then Allen performed and exhibited a mix of recreated and new works until his death in 2023. More recently the work of Pauline Rhodes has also become a regular part of the Michael Lett programme.

=== Selected exhibitions ===
- Martin Creed Work No 329: Half the air in a given space. (2006) Turner Prize winning artist Martin Creed half-filled Michael Lett’s original Karangahape Road space with pink balloons.
- Simon Denny: Starting from behind. (2009)
- Hany Armanious: Set Down. (2013)
- Michael Stevenson Proof of the Devil. (2013)
- Implicated and Immune. (2013) Group show.
- Julian Dashper again and again, again. (2016) A re-creation of an exhibition initially curated by Mark Kirby and Julian Dashper. In 2006 for Aratoi Wairarapa Museum of Art and History.
- Living with Aids 1988 . (2018) by Fiona Clark.
- Giovanni Intra. (2018) Documentation from Intra’s archives and a selection of artworks had Alex Davidson comment in the magazine Artforum, ‘… these material products of his early thought do offer new insights into the bearing of his life’s work, and as such it is significant that they are seen here together for the first time.‘
- Ian Scott Realist Paintings from the Late 1960s. (2019) Scott died in 2013 and this exhibition brought together a review of his early work.
- Douglas Wright: the Envoys. (2020)

== Controversy ==
In 2022, artist Matthew Griffin threw a pickle up at the ceiling of the gallery where it stayed stuck as part of an art installation. This was reported in The Guardian, the Daily Mail, The Times and NBC News Today.

== Selected Michael Lett publications ==
- Michael Parekōwhai (2007)
- The Estate of L Budd: Catalogue of Existent Works ( 2008)
- Jim Allen Poetry for Chainsaws & Hanging by a Thread II (2009)
- Julian Dashper: This is not Writing (2011)
- Affirmation Dungeon, by Dan Arps (2012) with Clouds Publishing
- Anthony Byrt Simon Denny: The Founder's Paradox a Compendium (2017)
- Fiona Clark: Living with Aids 1988 (2018)
- Imogen Taylor (2022)
- Michael Lett Documents 2021–2023 (2023)
