= Wayne Youle =

New Zealand artist

Wayne Youle (born 1974 in Tītahi Bay, Porirua) is a New Zealand artist of Ngāpuhi, Ngati Whakaeke and Ngati Pākehā descent. His bicultural heritage is reflected in his work, addressing issues of identity, race and the commodification of cultural symbols. He often uses humour to make his point. Youle's work is held in national museums and public galleries. He lives and works in Amberley, New Zealand.

== Career, themes and style ==
In 1999, Youle received a Bachelor of Design, majoring in typography, from Wellington Polytechnic Design School, New Zealand. His graduate show featured the words cultural blindness test in a series of diminishing letters like those on an optician's chart. His work incorporates clean lines, shapes, symbols and typography, repetition and recurrent motifs using a variety of materials and new technologies in 3D objects, sculpture, installation, graphite and ink drawings, photography, painting and tattooing.

Youle's works explore historical and current perceptions of Māori culture to question stereotypes and cultural traditions. For example, in Twelve Shades of Bullshit, silhouettes have been created in various shades of brown from illustrations of Māori drawn by early European explorers and artists. The work explores historical representations of Māori in New Zealand art and also comment on the various skin colours of contemporary Māori after 160 years of intermarriage.

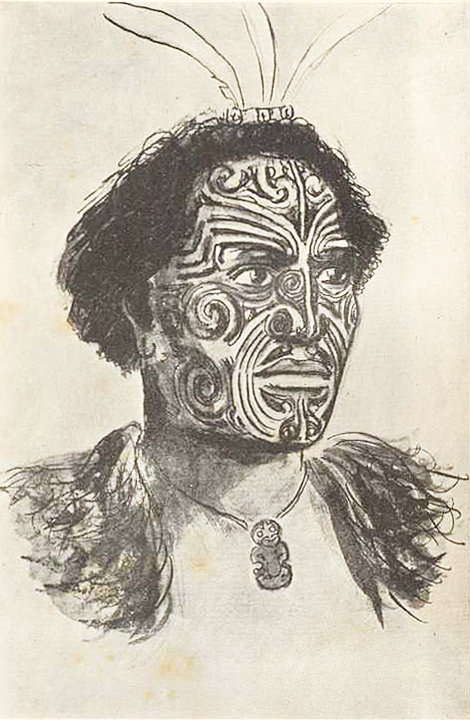
Hongi Hika, 18th – 19th century Ngāpuhi leader with tattooed face and tiki amulet

Since 2013, Youle has created a number of brightly coloured, stencil-like portraits. Originally based on existing photographs of deceased New Zealand artists, the series has expanded to include portraits of New Zealand and international characters living, historical and fictional. Among those depicted include Frances Hodgkins, Ralph Hotere, Len Lye, Colin McCahon, Damien Hirst, Captain James Cook, Michael King, Magic Johnson, E.T. and Michael Jackson. A catalogue illustrating a selection of the portraits was released by {Suite} Publishing in 2015. This catalogue accompanied Youle's solo presentation '9:54 | 3:49' with {Suite} Gallery at Sydney Contemporary 2015, where portraits of Stephen Hawking, Lindy Chamberlain and Sidney Nolan were exhibited.

Youle references the influence of other New Zealand artists in his work including Gordon Walters, Billy Apple, Shane Cotton, Peter Robinson, Ronnie van Hout and Michael Parekowhai, and Ricky Swallow of Australia.

== Symbols ==
=== Skulls ===
Youle's work features skulls based on tattoo designs, symbols of identification and belonging, for example, to gangs. Youle was inspired by his grandfather's tattoos, identifying him as a sailor. He also studies the historical origins and expressions of tā moko (permanent body and face markings of Māori). The head is tapu (sacred) in Māori culture. In Skully Pops (2004) Youle depicts mokomokai (ancient preserved heads), as inviting, bright coloured lollies that at the same time are an anathema to eat.

=== Koru ===
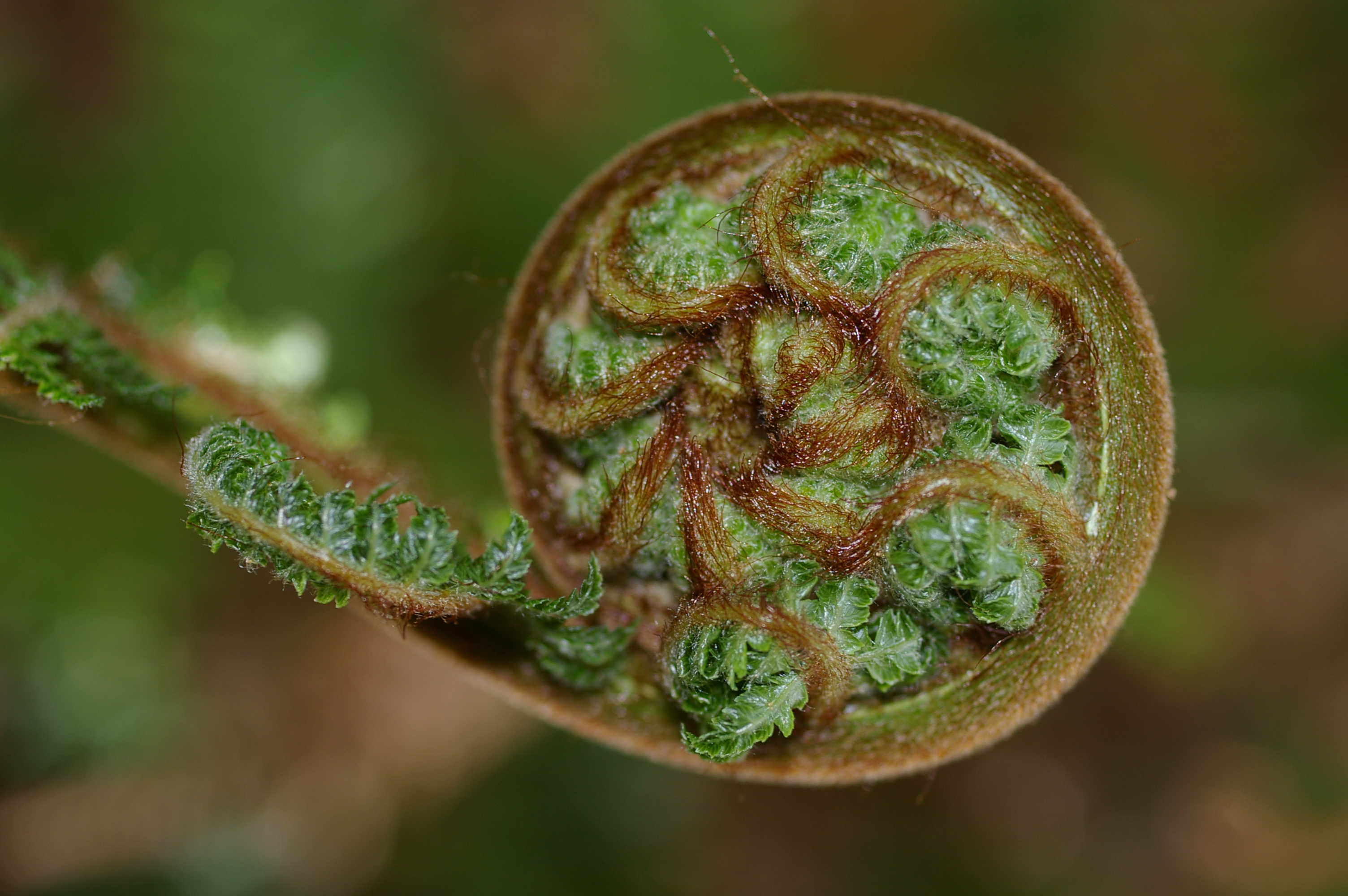
Koru shape in unfurling Silver Fern

The koru motif depicts the shape of the unfurling silver fern. In The Icon 500, Youle invited controversy by adapting the koru to the swastika to illustrate the origin of the swastika as a symbol of good will and challenge the way audiences can bring negative references with them. He called the work, This is not a swastika nor is it a Walters.

=== Hei Tiki ===
Youle's Often Liked, Occasionally Beaten (2004), consisting of multi-coloured resin tiki (the figure of the first man) on lollipop sticks, comments on the commercialisation of Māori taonga, mass production of Māori souvenirs and the cultural appropriation of Māori art. (Since the 1960s, plastic hei tiki have become a part of New Zealand popular culture, often regarded as one of the great kiwiana icons). The title of the work is a political play on the local Frosty Boy ice cream marketing catchphrase, Often licked, never beaten while alluding to the social issue of family violence.

== Artist residences ==
In 2010, Youle was the recipient of the Rita Angus Artist Residency hosted by the Wellington Institute of Technology's School of Creative Technologies. His exhibition One Step Forward, One Step Back was undertaken during this time. In various media, Youle studied the relationship between the Māori and the Pākehā (Europeans), focussing on the effect of the introduction of technology on the Māori, specifically the tribes of the Wellington region.

In 2011, Youle was selected as Wellesley College's first artist-in-residence. During his month at Wellesley in Days Bay, Wellington, he created 13 paintings and a series of sculptures. He also made a number of initiatives to raise primary school aged students creative interests.

In 2012, Youle was awarded the SCAPE/Artspace Christchurch Artist Residency at the Artspace Visual arts centre, Sydney. This body of work showcases Youle's pop-artist style depicting an array of subject matter for example, historical relations with Sydney's indigenous population, skulls, half naked men and women's breasts. Using strips of sign vinyl and dot painting on the surfaces of a range of found photographs, historic paintings and other ephemera, the works were presented in You be Fact, I Be Fiction.

== Selected works ==
- What Do You Say Savages (2011) is a set of 43 A2 size prints. Each one represents an item offered to the Māori in exchange for land under the Port Nicholson Deed. In 2013, this work was purchased by the Museum of New Zealand, Te Papa Tongarewa.
- I seem to have temporarily misplaced my sense of humour (2012), an outdoor mural presented by Christchurch Art Gallery and Gap Filler. The work is about the losses and the giving during the Christchurch earthquakes of February 2011: a giant nail board is marked with the silhouettes of tools such as hammers, saws, wrenches and unusual objects such as a security camera, a classical bust and a small dog.
- Plenty More (2012), an installation about the spiritual and physical loss of chattels: a number of domestic tables support more than 200 hand-thrown ceramic bowls created and accumulated by the artist over a period of 12 months.
- Flauntatiousness, the art car (2013) for SCAPE 7 Public Art Christchurch Biennial: a mobile artwork presents the artists of SCAPE 7 as ‘brands’ in the manner of high-performance motor-racing teams. Emblazoned alongside are sponsor logos and tongue in cheek comments on the current environment.

== Solo exhibitions ==
- 2017 Look mum no hands, Christchurch Art Gallery Te Puna o Waiwhetu, Christchurch, New Zealand (opening April 2017)
- 2017 Strangely Familiar, New Zealand Portrait Gallery, Wellington, New Zealand (opening April 2017)
- 2016 Bad Idea, {Suite}, Wellington, New Zealand
- 2016 The best stories ever told (revisited), {Suite}, Wellington, New Zealand
- 2015 9:54 | 3:49, {Suite} at Sydney Contemporary 2015, Carriageworks, Sydney, Australia
- 2015 Wayne Youle, {Suite}, Wellington, New Zealand
- 2014 Vacancies, {Suite}, Wellington, New Zealand
- 2013 You be Fact, I'll be Fiction, {Suite}, Wellington, New Zealand
- 2013 So they say..., Tauranga Art Gallery, Tauranga, New Zealand
- 2012 Fingers Crossed, Deane and Hirschfield Galleries, City Gallery, Wellington, New Zealand
- 2012 Make Pretend, {Suite}, Wellington, New Zealand
- 2011 One Step Forward, One Step Back, {Suite}, Wellington, New Zealand
- 2011 "!?"...:)' , {Suite}, Wellington, New Zealand
- 2010 It's The Simple Things, {Suite}, Wellington, New Zealand
- 2010 10 Down, Pataka Museum of Arts & Cultures, Porirua, New Zealand
- 2009 A Darker Kind of Light Heartedness, {Suite}, Wellington, New Zealand
- 2005 The Icon 500, The Physics Room, Christchurch, New Zealand

== Group exhibitions ==
- 2015 Cut + Paste: The Practice of Collage, The Dowse, Wellington, New Zealand
- 2013 SCAPE 7 Public Art Christchurch Biennial, Christchurch, New Zealand
- 2012 Never Mind the Pollocks, {Suite}, Wellington, New Zealand
- 2011 Auckland Art Fair, {Suite}, Auckland, New Zealand
- 2010 Melbourne Art Fair, Tim Melville, Melbourne, Australia
- 2009 Close Encounters, Hyde Park Art Center, Chicago, United States of America
- 2008 Another NZ Another United State, Mexico City, Tokyo, United States of America
- 2007 Winners are Grinners, PICA, Perth, Australia
- 2006 Pasifika Styles, University of Cambridge, United Kingdom
- 2005 Hei Tiki, Auckland Art Gallery, Auckland, New Zealand
- 2001 Techno Maori: Maori Art in the Digital Age, City Gallery Wellington & Pataka Museum of Arts and Cultures, Porirua, New Zealand
- 1999 Joint show with Barry Thomas Pātaka Museum of Arts and Cultures

== Public collections in New Zealand ==
Youle has works in collections including:

- Museum of New Zealand Te Papa Tongarewa, Wellington
- Christchurch Art Gallery, Te Puna o Waiwhetu, Christchurch
- Wellington City Council Collection, Wellington, New Zealand
- Chartwell Collection, Auckland Art Gallery Toi o Tamaki, Auckland
- James Wallace Arts Trust, Auckland
- Real Art Roadshow, Wanaka
