= Denise Kum =

New Zealand artist (born 1968)

Denise Kum (born 1968) is a New Zealand artist. Her works are held in the collection of Auckland Art Gallery Toi o Tāmaki, Museum of New Zealand Te Papa Tongarewa, and the University of Auckland art collection.

== Biography ==
Kum was born in Auckland in 1968. She gained a BFA from the Elam School of Fine Arts in 1992. In the same year, Kum was a founding member of Teststrip, an artist-run gallery for contemporary and experimental art.

Teststrip, Auckland's first artist-run gallery, was founded by Lucy MacDonald, Merylyn Tweedie, Giovanni Intra, Daniel Malone, Judy Darragh, Gail Haffern, Kirsty Cameron and Kum. The space was initially set up to provide the founding artists with a venue for showing their work. Teststrip received a small grant from Creative New Zealand in 1995, which enabled the move to a new space on Karangahape Rd and employment of a paid administrator. Teststrip began connecting with networks of similar galleries overseas, and their international advisory board included Lilian Budd, Kathy Temin, Mikala Dwyer and Harmony Korine. The decision was made to close Teststrip in 1998 resulted from a desire to finish "cleanly and strongly, rather than peter out or recruit." Teststrips micrograph publishing project continued working after the gallery closed.

Kum is known for her work with experimental home-made plastics, and her works with consumable materials such as beeswax, seaweed and food, often allowed to decay and breakdown.

== Exhibitions ==
- The Secret Life of Paint (2007), Dunedin Public Art Gallery
- Fondant (2004), Economist Tower foyer, London
- Bloom (2003), Govett-Brewster Art Gallery, New Plymouth
- New Work (2002), Sue Crockford Gallery, Auckland
- Alive!: Still Life into the Twenty First Century (2001), Adam Art Gallery, Wellington
- Plastika (2000), Govett-Brewster Art Gallery, New Plymouth
- Leap of Faith (1998), Govett-Brewster Art Gallery, New Plymouth
- Currents (1998), Govett-Brewster Art Gallery, New Plymouth
- 11th Biennale of Sydney (1998), Sydney
- Thinking About Contemporary Art (1997), Centre of Contemporary Art, Christchurch
- Transfusion/Fusion (1996), Hong Kong Arts Centre, Hong Kong and Auckland Art Gallery Toi o Tāmaki. This show was a culmination of a Hong Kong- New Zealand artists exchange, and presented works from three New Zealand artists – Kum, Luise Fong and Yuk King Tan.
- The Nervous System (1995), City Gallery Wellington, and Govett-Brewster Art Gallery, New Plymouth
- Northern Exposure (1995), McDougall Art Annex, Christchurch
- Recent Sculptitecture, Horribly Desirable (1995), Hamish McKay Gallery, Wellington
- n+1 Cultures (1994), Artspace, Auckland
- Art Now: The First Biennial Review of Contemporary Art (1994), Museum of New Zealand Te Papa Tongarewa, Wellington
- Localities of Desire: Contemporary Art in an International World (1994), Museum of Contemporary Art, Sydney
- Tales Untold: Unearthing Christchurch Histories (1994), Christchurch
- Mediatrix (1993–94), Artspace and the Govett-Brewster Art Gallery, Auckland
- Under My Skin (1993), High Street Project Gallery, Christchurch
