= Gambia Castle =

Gallery in Auckland, New Zealand

Gambia Castle was an artist-run gallery in Auckland, New Zealand between 2007 and 2010.

== History ==
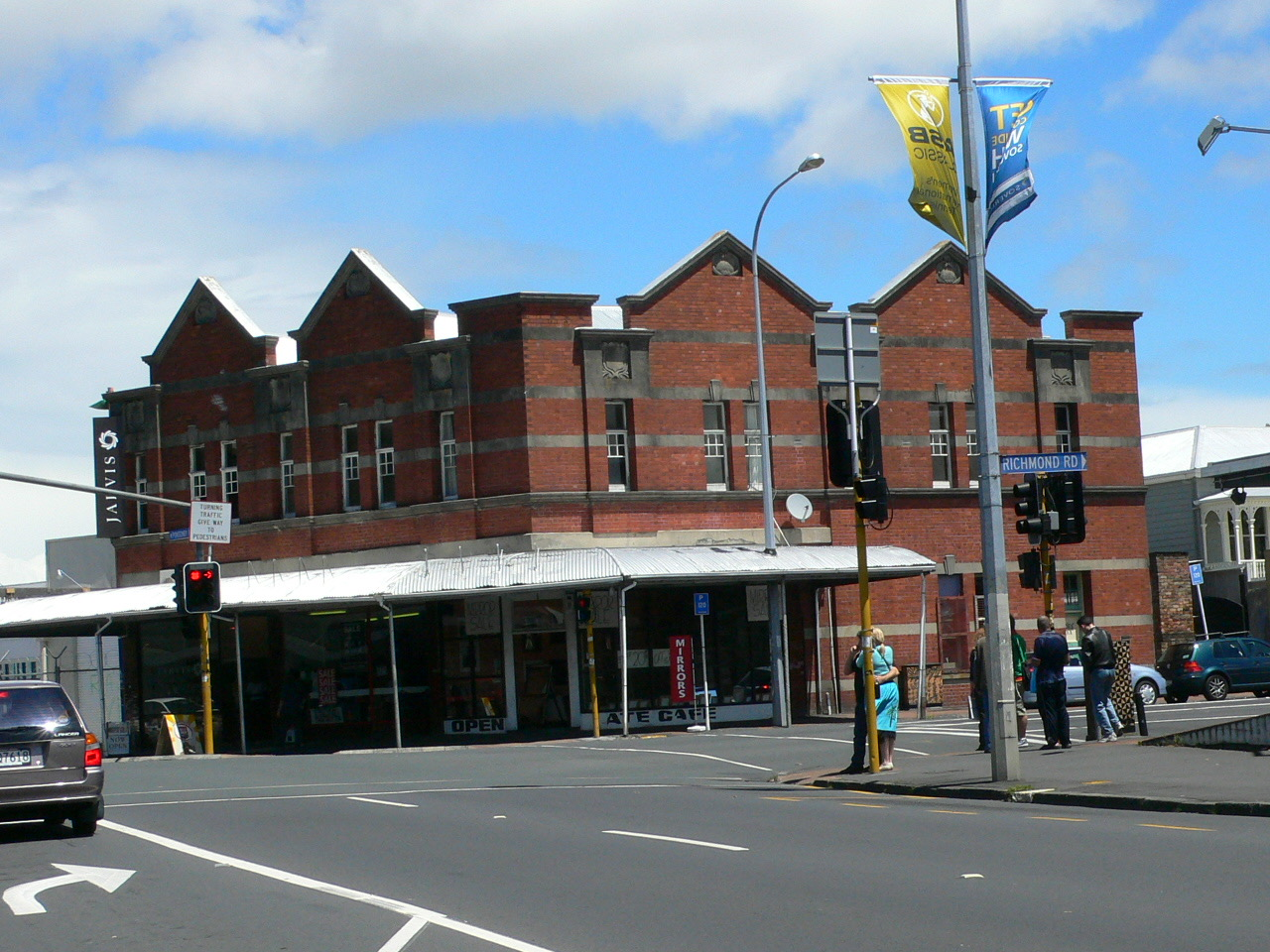
The Gambia Castle gallery was upstairs in this building on the corner of Karangahape and Richmond Roads.

Gambia Castle was initiated in 2007 by a group of Auckland artists and art writers. They were Dan Arps, Nick Austin, Andrew Barber, Fiona Connor, Simon Denny, Sarah Hopkinson, David Levinson, Daniel Malone, Tahi Moore, Kate Newby and Tao Wells. The gallery was initially on level one at the corner of Ponsonby Road and Richmond Road but after a year moved to the space previously occupied by Teststrip at 454 Karangahape Road. An artist-run gallery, with Sarah Hopkinson as the gallery manager, Gambia Castle was also active in making sales to the public and to institutions. One of the early exhibitions, a large installation by Daniel Malone, titled Black Market to my Name was purchased by the Chartwell Collection.

== Exhibitions ==
Many of the exhibitions at Gambia Castle were solo shows of the artists involved or invited guests with most works available for sale. There were also group exhibitions a number of which were curated by Sarah Hopkinson who also helped produced the texts for catalogues and publicity material along with David Levinson.

Gambia Castle exhibitions included:

Old Buildings a 2007 installation by Fiona Connor. Connor replicated the entire floor of the exhibition space and then installed it over the original floor noticeably raising its level and changing the ‘feel’ of the spaces.

Explaining Things, Dan Arps’ Gambia Castle installation of 2008, went on to win the prestigious Walters Prize in 2010. The judge, former Tate Modern director Vicente Todoli, said that Arps had managed to turn Explaining Things, “into a revelatory multi-layered experience.”

Three Ideas for the State Tao Wells' 2008 installation, of three ideas, written in pencil and glued to the wall, with one typed up price list, floating around, each on a single sheet of A4 paper: was reviewed by Mark Amery for the Dominion Post Newspaper. "The ideas were decent and achievable ... The clinch was that Wells put a price on putting these ideas into motion on your behalf as a buyer... to question the social function of the contemporary gallery space, the political role of the artist and the conflicting value placed on an art object's sale"

Carry on or Stow Away featured Louise Menzies and Fiona Connor alongside six Mexican artists marcelaygina, Eduardo Abaroa, Tania Perez Cordova, Adriana Lara, Joaquin Segura, Sofia Taboas and Australian Sanne Mestrom. This exhibition was developed from contacts made during a residency that Fiona Connor, Kate Newby and Louise Menzies had at SOMA in Mexico City.

== Publications ==
The gallery also produced a number of publications including catalogues and artists' books. In 2008 Sarah Hopkinson edited a book about the gallery titled Gambia Castle. The contents included ‘excerpts from stories and conversations, poetry, notes, photographs, and drawings that, when read as a collection, accurately convey a picture of what it means to make art in the year 2007.’

== See also ==
- Teststrip Gallery
