= Teststrip =

Former gallery in New Zealand

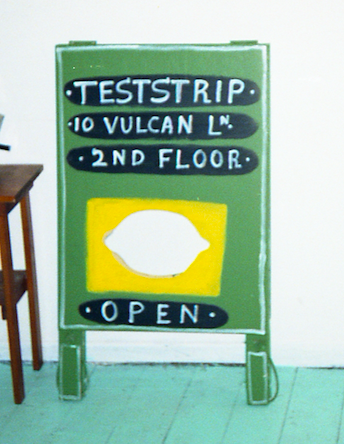
- Teststrip gallery sign
- Established: 1992
- Dissolved: 1997
- Location: Vulcan Lane and Karangahape Road, Auckland
- Type: Artist run gallery

Teststrip was an artist run gallery that operated in Auckland, New Zealand from 1992 to 1997.

== History ==
In late 1992 the artists Kirsty Cameron, Judy Darragh, Gail Haffern, Giovanni Intra, Denise Kum, Lucy Macdonald, Daniel Malone and Merylyn Tweedie formed the artist collective Teststrip. The Teststrip Gallery was opened the same year on the second floor of 10 Vulcan Lane in Auckland’s CBD where Daniel Malone was living at the time. In mid 1994 the gallery relocated to the first floor of 454 Karangahape Road. The new space had two galleries upstairs and a shop window exhibition space at street level. Writer and artist Stella Brennan described Teststrip as, “Sassy, careerist and self-aware, by its persistent charm Teststrip alerted others to the possible joys of running a gallery. This was clearly the case as shown by Teststrip acting as an inspirational model for artist run galleries such as FUZZIE VIBES, NewCall and Gambia Castle.

== Exhibitions ==
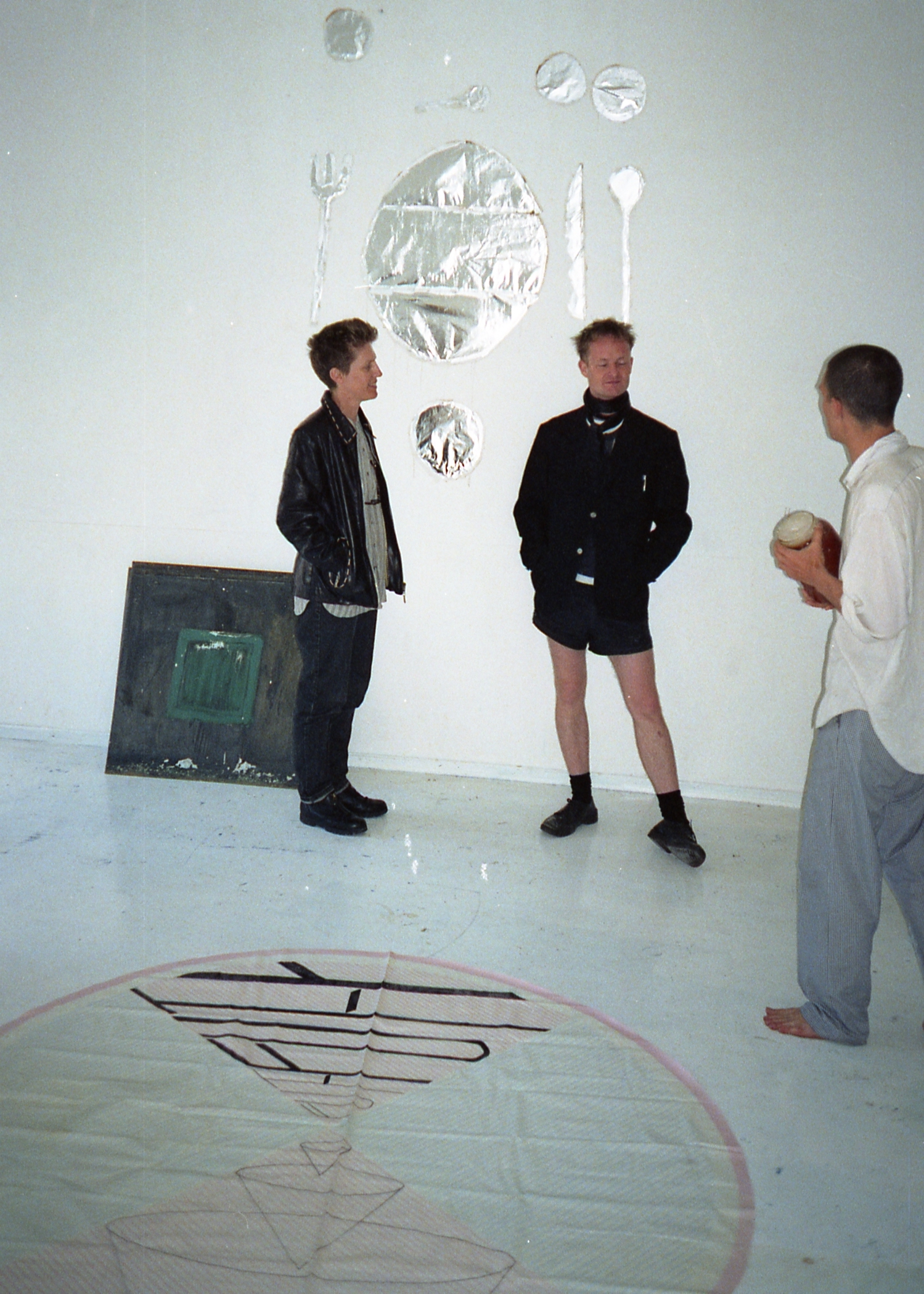
The Teststrip gallery in Vulcan Lane with artists Merylyn Tweedie, Giovanni Intra and Daniel Malone, 1992

The first Teststrip exhibition in November 1992 was entitled Stock Show and included seven of the eight Teststrip members. In 1992 and early 1993 exhibitions were largely confined to the Teststrip collective members. It was a model that would influence later artist-run gallweries like Gambia Castle and Mercy Pictures. Another early exhibition, this time also demonstrating Teststrip’s ambitious attitude, had nine of the artists travel to Wellington in March 1993 to present Teststrip on tour a group exhibition at Cubewell House in Wellington. Writer Stuart McKenzie noted that Teststrip shared, “a nostalgia for the avant-gard” and that, “the best of Teststrip is both iconoclastic and commanding.” Over the next five years, including an ongoing series of street front windows installations, Teststrip would present over 160 exhibitions. By 1994 a wider range of artists were being asked to exhibit including Matthew Hyland, Simon Cumming Ronnie van Hout, Billy Apple, Fiona Amundsen, Mikala Dwyer, Yuk King Tan and Annie O’Neill.

In May 1997 a Teststrip Window exhibition by artist Peter Robinson, a painting entitled Pākehā have Rights too featuring a Nazi swastika, caused controversy when it was covered in protesting graffiti. The last exhibition at Teststrip, Gold Watch: new work from the Teststrip Board included four of the original Teststrip members Cameron, Darragh, Kum and Malone plus Simon Cumming who had been with the group for most of the journey.

== Publishing ==
Many of the Teststrip exhibitions were accompanied by a small publication often back grounding the exhibition and produced as a series of publications presented as Teststrip Micrographs. The first of these was Pose compiled by Giovanni Intra and Susan Hillary for their exhibition of the same name in 1994. In all 26 Teststrip Micrographs were published in three series. The last Teststrip Micrograph was compiled by Daniel Malone for his exhibition malone@artspace in 2003. Matthew Hyland in reviewing Micrographs 1-10 outlines the history of their production describing them as, "distilling [art’s] essence so that the consumer has total control over her intake."

== Archive ==
A full list of all Teststrip exhibitions can be found in the book Teststrip: the history of an artist run space (1992-1997) and an archive of all issues of the Teststrip Micrographs is held at the E H McCormick Research Library, Auckland Art Gallery Toi o Tāmaki.

== See also ==
- Gambia Castle
