= Merylyn Tweedie =

New Zealand mixed media artist

Merylyn Tweedie (born 1953) is a multi-media artist from New Zealand. In 2004 she won the Walters Prize, New Zealand's largest contemporary art prize, and in 2003 her work was selected to represent New Zealand at the Venice Biennale.

== Biography ==
Tweedie was born in Christchurch in 1953 and attended Rangi Ruru Girls' School. She began exhibiting in 1975; initially she created and exhibited photographs, and later moved into collages, found objects and films. In 1992 Tweedie joined seven other artists (Kirsty Cameron, Judy Darragh, Gail Haffern, Giovanni Intra, Denise Kum, Lucy Macdonald and Daniel Malone) to open an artist-owned exhibition space in Vulcan Lane, Auckland, known as Teststrip, which ran until 1997.

The work which was selected for the 2005 Venice Biennale was created under the pseudonym et al., which presents itself as a collective of artists headed by Tweedie, but is in fact Tweedie herself. The installation, the fundamental practice, used sound, computers and mechanical devices and was designed to question the way people consume information and the media power structures of our societies.

The selection of et al. to represent New Zealand was met with some controversy in the country as misinformation regarding the artist's identity, income and the use of public money was circulated in the media. However the installation was met with praise from international art critics and reviewers.

Tweedie's work is held in the collection of Museum of New Zealand Te Papa Tongarewa, the Christchurch Art Gallery and the Govett-Brewster Art Gallery.
