= Simon Denny (artist) =

New Zealand artist

Simon Denny MNZM
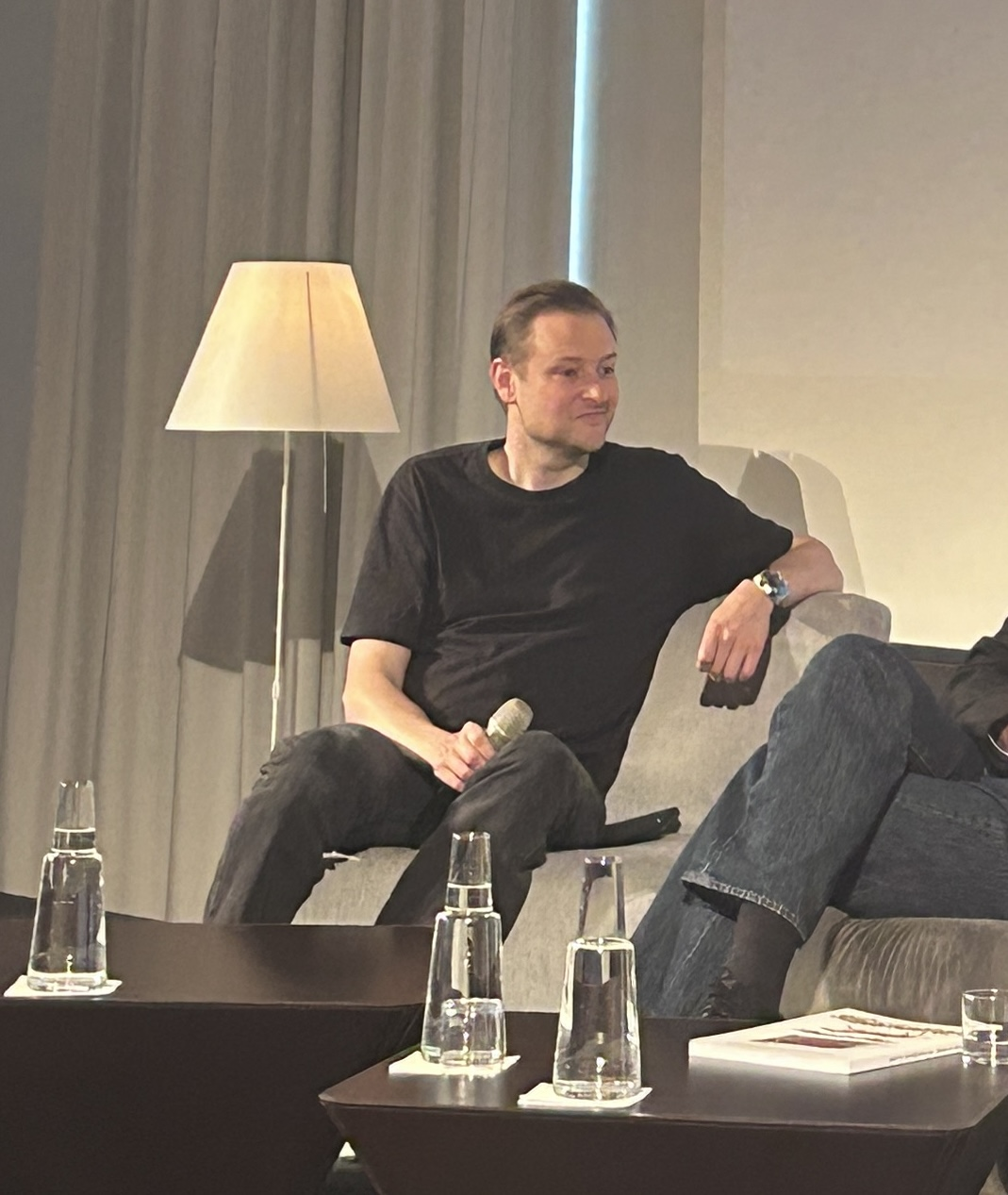
- Denny in 2023
- Born: Simon Eric Denny; 1982 (age 43–44); Auckland, New Zealand
- Education: Elam School of Fine Arts; Meisterschule, Städelschule, Frankfurt am Main
- Known for: Installations, paintings and sculpture
- Spouse: Maria Paula Fernandez (m. 2024)
- Awards: Baloise Art Prize (2012)

Simon Eric Denny MNZM (born 1982) is a contemporary artist based in Berlin. He represented New Zealand at the 2015 Venice Biennale. Since 2018 he is a professor for time based media at the HFBK Hamburg.

== Early life and education ==
Born in Auckland, Denny studied at the University of Auckland’s Elam School of Fine Arts from 2001 to 2005 and at the Städelschule in Frankfurt am Main under Willem de Rooij from 2007 to 2009.

== Career ==
Denny makes sculptures and installations that take his research into the practices and aesthetics of technology companies and products as their starting point. His subject matter has included the redesign of the New Zealand passport, German technology conferences, and internet entrepreneur Kim Dotcom.

Denny has produced three exhibitions under the title The Personal Effects of Kim Dotcom, in which the artist presented replicas and stand-ins for the items seized from Kim Dotcom's home in a raid carried out by New Zealand Police. The exhibition was first presented at Museum moderner Kunst Stiftung Ludwig Wien (mumok) in Vienna in 2013, then recreated at Firstsite in Colchester and the Adam Art Gallery in Wellington in 2014.

In 2015 Denny had his first major American solo museum show, The Innovator's Dilemma at MoMA PS1. In November 2015 his solo exhibition Products for Organising opened at the Serpentine Gallery in London. Denny is represented by Galerie Buchholz. Denny entered into cryptoart in 2021.

Denny was also a founding member of the Auckland artist-run gallery Gambia Castle.

=== Venice Biennale 2015 ===
Simon Denny at his Venice Biennale exhibition, May 2015

In 2013 Denny was announced as New Zealand's representative at the 56th Venice Biennale. His Secret Power installations were staged at the Biblioteca Nazionale Marciana and the arrivals lounge of the Marco Polo Airport. Based on Denny's research into the National Security Agency's use of imagery, the exhibition in the artist's words examines '“the way the contemporary world is depicted in imagery used by the NSA; and it imagines a possible artistic context for the way that imagery was produced.”

In September 2015 New Zealand's national museum, Te Papa, announced it had acquired four works from the Secret Power installation for its permanent collection.

=== Selected exhibitions ===
- 2014 New Management Portikus, Frankfurt
- 2015 The Innovator's Dilemma, MoMA PS1, Long Island City, New York
- 2016 Simon Denny: Products for Organising, Serpentine Gallery, London
- 2017 The Founder's Paradox Michael Lett, Auckland
- 2017 Hammer Projects: Simon Denny, Hammer Museum, Los Angeles
- 2019 Mine Museum of Old and New Art Tasmania, Australia
- 2021 Mine Petzel Gallery New York
- 2021 Pioneers Petzel Gallery at Art Basel OVR
- 2020 Altman Siegel at Art Basel OVR: Miami Beach
- 2020 Curated Selection: New Painting, Sculpture, and Works on Paper Petzel Gallery, New York
- 2022 Creation Stories (with Karamia Müller) Gus Fisher Gallery, Auckland
- 2023 Simon Denny: Metaverse Landscapes Kunstverein Hannover
- 2023 Optimism Auckland Art Gallery Toi o Tāmaki

== Honours and awards ==
- 2012 finalist in the Walters Prize, New Zealand
- 2012 Baloise Art Prize at Art Basel for Channel Document project
- 2013 selected for the curated exhibition at the 2013 Venice Biennale
- 2015 represented New Zealand at the 2015 Venice Biennale
- 2015 recognised as a 'New Generation' artist by the Arts Foundation of New Zealand

In the 2025 King’s Birthday Honours, Denny was appointed a Member of the New Zealand Order of Merit, for services to art.

=== Personal life ===
In 2024, Denny married Maria Paula Fernandez, an Argentinian activist and tech entrepreneur who focuses, among other things, on the application of blockchain technology in the art industry. Fernandez is also a co-founder of the Department of Decentralisation. They live with their dog, Tupac Amaru ("Tupi"), in Berlin, Germany.
