= Ronnie van Hout =

New Zealand painter, photographer and sculptor (born 1962)

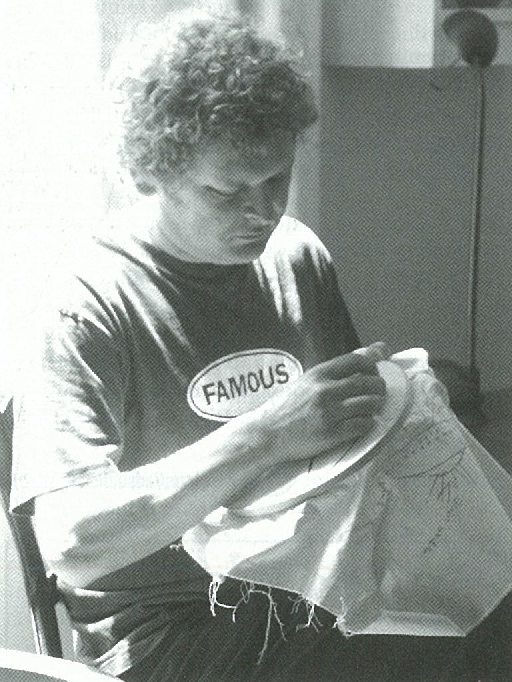
- Ronnie van Hout, 2003
- Born: 22 February 1962 (age 64); Christchurch
- Education: School of Fine Arts, Canterbury University, 1980 - 1982, Master of Fine Arts, RMIT University of Melbourne, 1999
- Known for: Sculpture, video and installations

Ronnie van Hout (born 22 February 1962) is a New Zealand artist and musician living in Melbourne, Australia. He works across a wide variety of media including sculpture, video, painting, photography, embroidery, and sound recordings.

== Early life and education ==
Born in Christchurch on 22 February 1962, Van Hout attended the Ilam School of Fine Arts at the University of Canterbury between 1980 and 1982, where he majored in film. In 1999, he gained a Master of Fine Arts from RMIT University, Melbourne.

== Music ==
=== The Pin Group ===
In the early eighties while still studying at the University of Canterbury School of Fine Arts, van Hout became involved in the Christchurch music scene. Initially he worked with The Pin Group, who were signed to Flying Nun Records, designing posters and filming them in action. Roger Shepherd, owner of Flying Nun, described van Hout’s work as, ‘colorful Warholian images’. He later described van Hout's cover for The Pin Group’s debut single "Ambivalence" as, ‘black on black and depicted an image of helicopters. An allusion to US “black ops” with clandestine undercover secret operations that were real when they were not conspiracy theories.' Van Hout also produced printed material for other Flying Nun bands.

=== Into The Void ===
From 1988 Van Hout was also a member of the band Into the Void. Band member Paul Sutherland recalled, ‘Ronnie was just part of the scene, and so he just turned up, but it was pretty obvious he couldn’t play an instrument, so he became a singer and we were a band.’ Into the Void would also sign with Flying Nun Records and still reunites occasionally, playing together as recently as 2016.

== Selected solo exhibitions ==
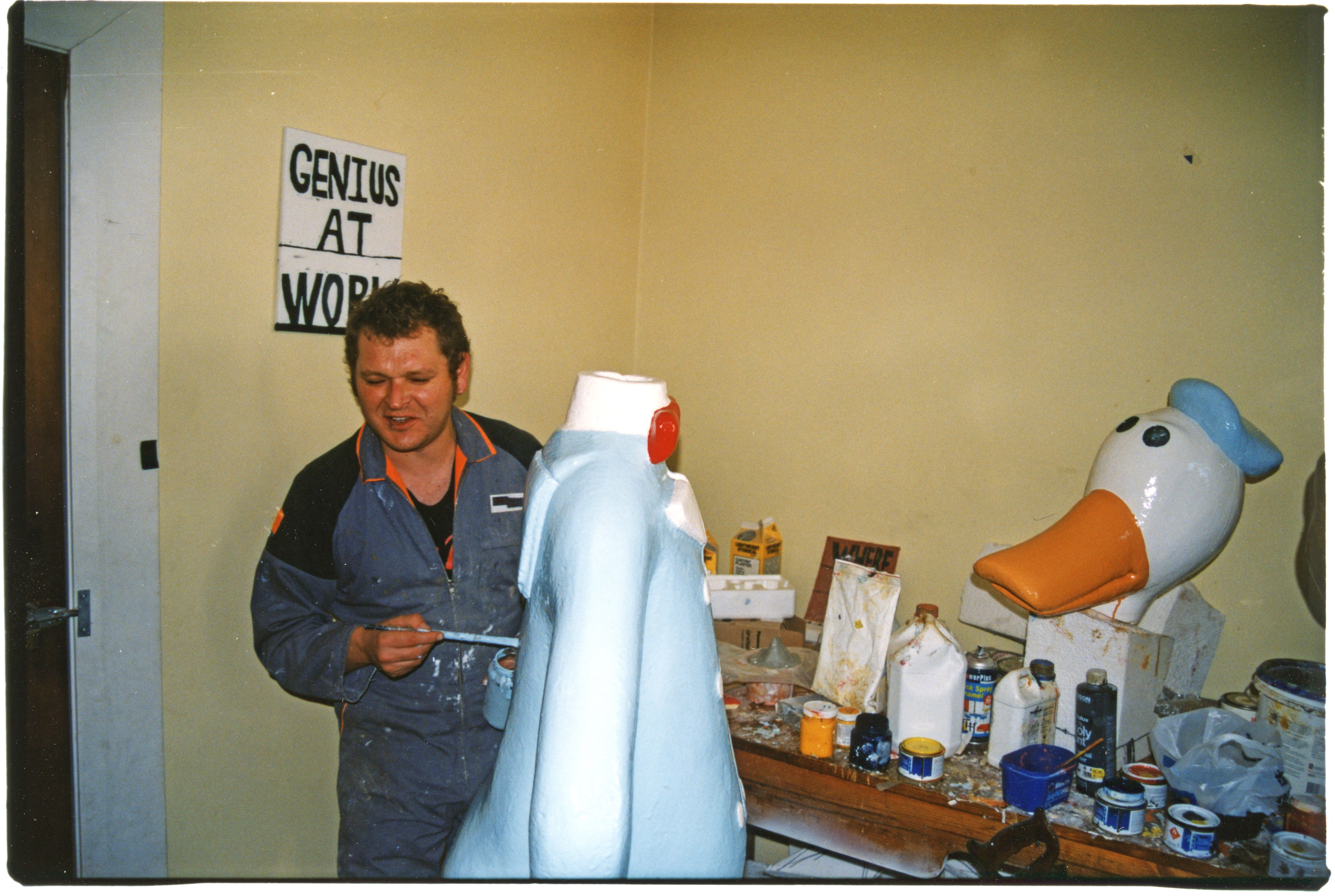
Ronnie van Hout in his Auckland studio, 1998

Van Hout has exhibited extensively, in Australia, New Zealand and internationally, at private and public galleries. His first solo exhibition was More for Less at City Limits café in Wellington and he was also included in the influential exhibition Hangover curated by Lara Strongman for the Waikato Museum and Art Gallery (now known as Waikato Museum Te Whare Taonga o Waikato) in 1993. He showed with the Auckland group Teststrip, as well as Gregory Flint Gallery, Hamish McKay Gallery, Gow Langsford Gallery, Ivan Anthony Gallery as well as Station and Darren Knight Gallery in Australia.

1994

Elvis in Geyserland, Rotorua Public Art Gallery.

1995

Skin Problems Teststrip Gallery, Auckland.

1996

I’m OK. Govett-Brewster Art Gallery with a catalogue essay by John Hurrell.

Father, Son, Holy Ghost, Manawatu Art Gallery (now known as Te Manawa). Reviewer Robin Neate commented of the exhibition that van Hout, ‘…conjured up as many meanings as you can bring to a work.’

2003

I’ve Abandoned Me. This survey exhibition curated by Justin Paton at the Dunedin Public Art Gallery toured in 2003 and 2004 to Auckland, Wellington and Palmerston North. Paton described van Hout’s career as, ‘[jutting] up on the horizon like a combined laboratory, hall of mirrors and haunted house.’

2008

BED/SIT Artspace, Sydney. The gallery's brochure comments, 'The "furniture" represented in BED/SIT is fake furniture. It is also more than fake - it is double fake. What could be perceived as a representation of simple furniture is also a superficial copy of an artwork by American artist Robert Morris.'

2009

Who Goes There? Curated by Justin Paton at the Christchurch Art Gallery it featured the work The Thing inspired by van Hout’s experience in the Antarctic.

2010

Uncured. Ronnie van Hout at the Institute of Modern Art (IMA) in Brisbane. The gallery's brochure comments, ‘His tragicomic works mash up Sartre and Beckett with The Two Ronnies and The Nutty Professor.’

2012

Ronnie van Hout: I've Seen Things, The Dowse Art Museum, Lower Hutt. The exhibition coincided with the installation of van Hout’s sculpture Fallen Robot in the courtyard outside the gallery.

== Public sculptures ==
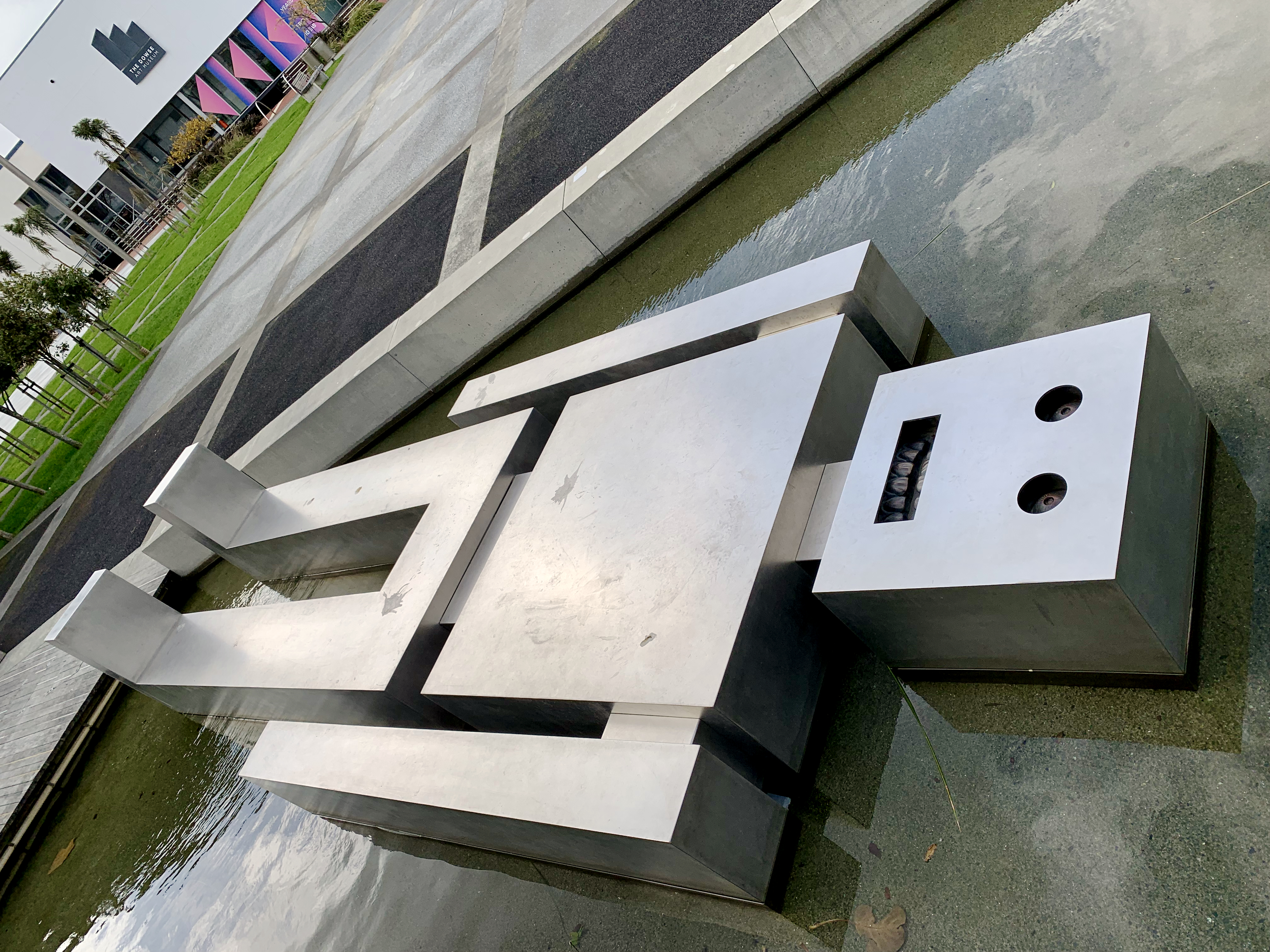
Fallen Robot

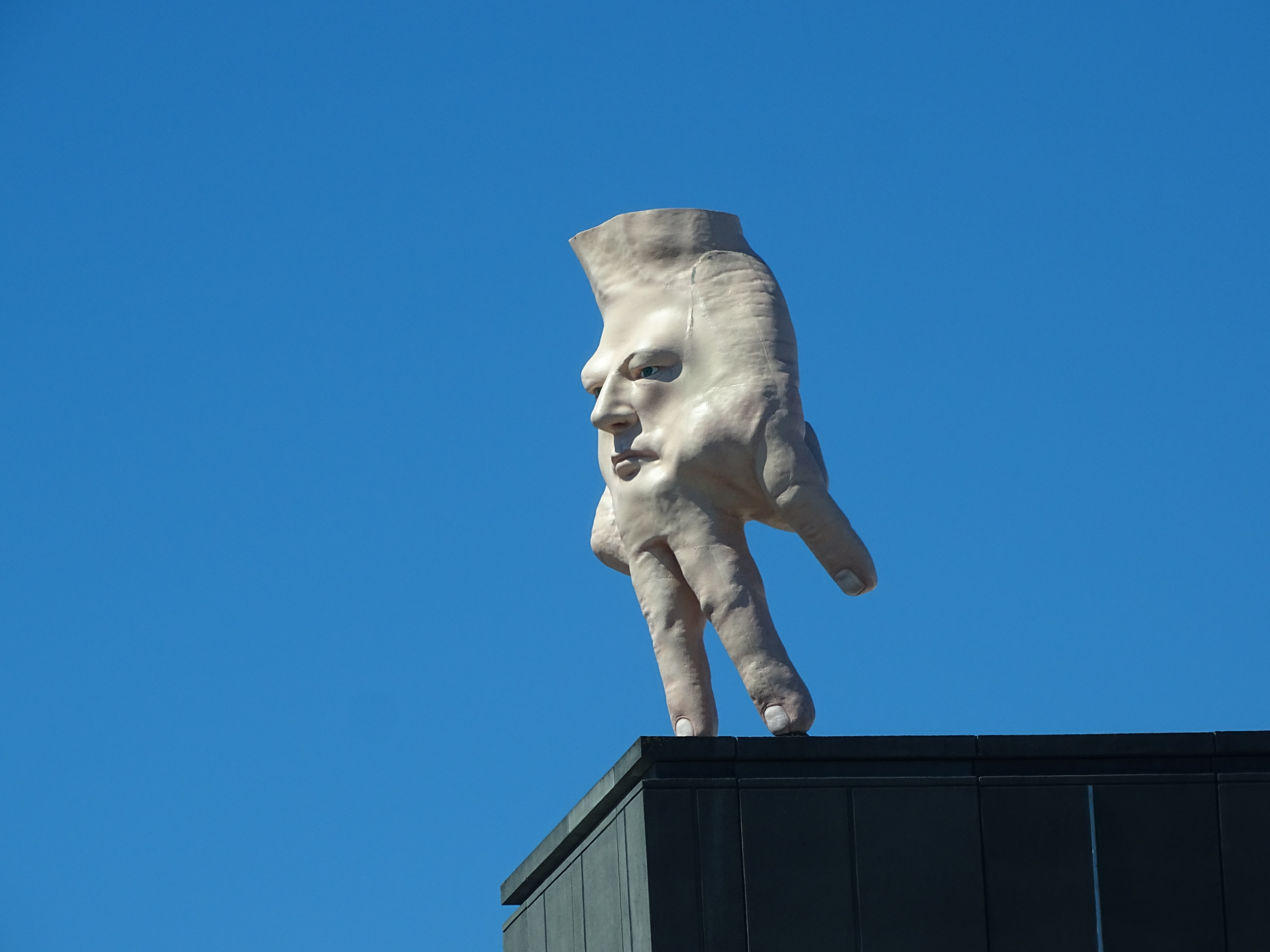
Quasi

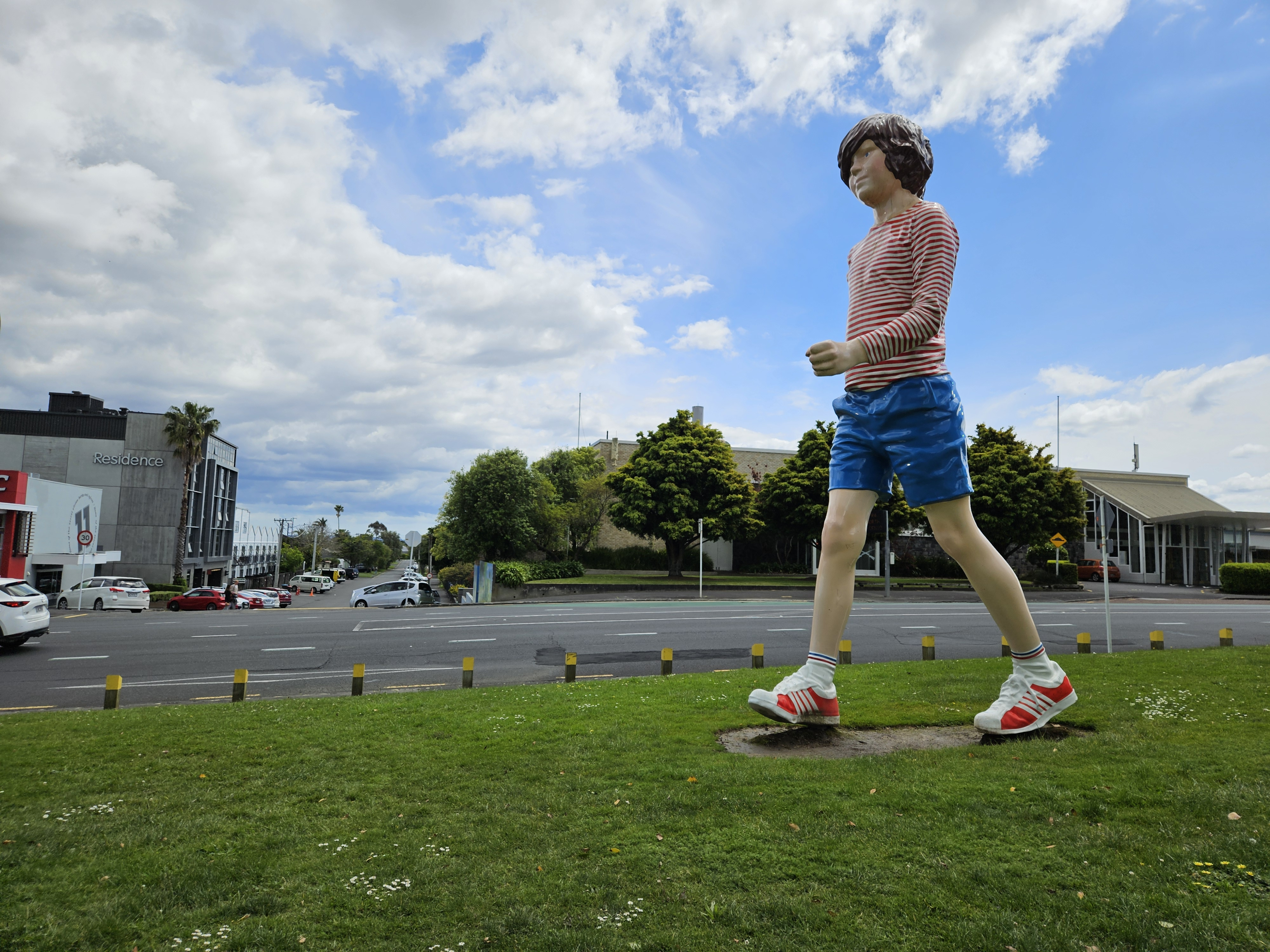
Boy Walking

Van Hout has also produced a number of large-scale or permanent public art works including:

2008

R.U.R. Titled after the 1921 play by Czech playwright Karel Capek, the first to popularise the term robot, R. U. R. lay prone, as though just having fallen outside the Royal Exhibition Building during the opening of the Melbourne Art Fair. The work was later shown at Monash University.

2001

Rear Window, Dunedin Public Art Gallery. The artist constantly opens the viewing window in a security door, but no-one is there.

2018

A Loss Again, Te Papa's Sculpture terrace featured an installation by van Hout of two replicas of his father’s tool shed.

2012

Fallen Robot, The 7.2m-long stainless steel sculpture of a prone robot is situated in the courtyard outside the Dowse Art Museum.

2013

Coming Down. Part of the Gallery project Populate, Van Hout told the Gallery, ‘'With the title Coming Down I wanted to capture multiple meanings. The falling down of buildings or sculptures; the idea that something in the sky is possibly coming down; and the idea that an experience is passing, and we are coming to ground from a high point.'

2014

Dayton. This reclining robot of aluminium and steel was installed at Monash University's Clayton campus.

2016

Quasi in Christchurch. The giant hand sculpture was first installed on the roof of the Christchurch Art Gallery Te Puna o Waiwhetu.

2019

Quasi in Wellington. After its time on the Christchurch Art Gallery building Quasi was installed on the roof of City Gallery Wellington. The media's response was mostly negative, with the BBC headlining, ‘Nightmare' Hand Statue Looms over New Zealand City. The Wellington City Council responded, ‘This 'nightmare' is our delightful new resident and we won't hear a word against him. We love this little guy. So if you're not a fan I suggest you talk to the hand"

Boy Walking. A giant boy in shorts and striped t-shirt heads purposefully through Potters Park in Auckland. Van Hout, who used to live in the area, explained that the oversized child is moving into the future with confidence and his sculpture was exploring the notion of a child transitioning into adulthood. The work was installed overnight. As at 2025, the face of this sculpture has been (humorously?) pixellated or smudged by Google & Apple's mapping apps. Presumably, this is because the statue is so lifelike, the apps' algorithms presume it is human and, therefore, worthy of anonymity.

== Residencies and awards ==
A selection of van Hout's artist residencies and awards:

1996

A three month artist in residence at the Govett-Brewster Art Gallery and Taranaki Polytechnic in New Plymouth, New Zealand.

1998

Creative New Zealand International Visual Art Residency. Van Hout attended the International Studio Programme in New York for four months.

2004

Finalist Walters Prize, Auckland Art Gallery Toi o Tāmaki. Van Hout was represented by No Exit Parts 1 and 2, 2003 which was purchased by the Auckland Art Gallery Toi o Tāmaki. The title is from the Jean-Paul Sartre play of 1944 Huis Clos (No Exit). The Walters Prize jury said of van Hout's exhibition, ‘His works do something rare in the world of contemporary art - make you laugh but leave you strangely moved.’ The Judge was art academic and writer Robert Storr.

2005

Creative New Zealand one year residency in Berlin at Kunstlerhaus Bethanien. Van Hout recalled. 'It was only the New Zealanders who had been in residence in Berlin who actually made work. It's a different attitude [which was] seen as strangely old-fashioned…’ His exhibition at the Kunstlerhaus was an installation titled Back door and was described as, ‘devoted to memory and demonstrates – using an example from his own childhood – the impossibility of recalling one’s own history as a description of facts….’

Arts Foundation Te Tumu Toi Laureate Award. The Awards were established in 2000 to ‘celebrate and empower New Zealand’s most outstanding artists’. (Linda Herrick Top artists receive Laureate Awards.

2007

Artists in Antarctica Programme. In November 2007 Ronnie van Hout and writer Tessa Duder traveled to Antarctica. In one work resulting from his visit, van Hout used film he took of Scott’s Hut to re-enact scenes from the horror film The Thing.

2008

Rita Angus Residency. The residency enables artists to live and work in the small cottage in Sydney Street West that Rita Angus used as a studio and home during her time in Wellington.

== Further reading and viewing ==
=== Selected works ===
- Howard Menger "Signwriter" 1986 view view
- That was Perfect 1989 view
- Untitled (Male Rock/Pop Singer) 1993 view
- Untitled 1995 view
- Undead (Green Version) 1995 view
- Help Me I’m in the Land of Giants 1996 view
- Psycho 1999 view
- House and School 2001 view
- Sick Chimp 2002 view
- End Doll 2007 view

=== Reading ===
Anthony Byrt Who's There: Ronnie van Hout and the Anti-Hero Aesthetic.

Blair French Model Images: The Recent Photography of Ronnie van Hout 1990.

John Hurrell, Review of Who Goes There, EyeContact, 27 September 2009

John Hurrell, Review of The Other Mother, EyeContact, 28 June 2011

Tom Cardy, Van Hout's latest hits the Dowse, The DominionPost, 12 July 2012

Robert Leonard, Unnerved: The New Zealand Project, Eyeline, no. 73, 2011

Harriet Litten’s MA Thesis Antarctic influences on artists. (Harriet Litten Master thesis Imagining Antarctica: Responses from Contemporary Artists .

The King of Comedy: The Cinema, Cezanne, Nazis and Sausages. Robin Neate talks to Ronnie van Hout 1994.

=== Viewing ===
Into the Void playing Black Window.

The Elvis Presley Movie (1981) and Ghosting (2020). Two Ronnie van Hout video works.

Sitting Figure 2016.Ronnie van Hout discussing a work in the collection of the National Gallery of Australia.

Artist Voice: Ronnie van Hout. Van Hout interviews himself. Introduced by Lara Strongaman for the MCA, Sydney.

Boy Walking.

== Collections ==
Van Hout's work is held in many public collections including the Auckland Art Gallery, Museum of New Zealand Te Papa Tongarewa, Christchurch Art Gallery and the Public Art Gallery.
