= Michael Parekōwhai =

New Zealand sculptor

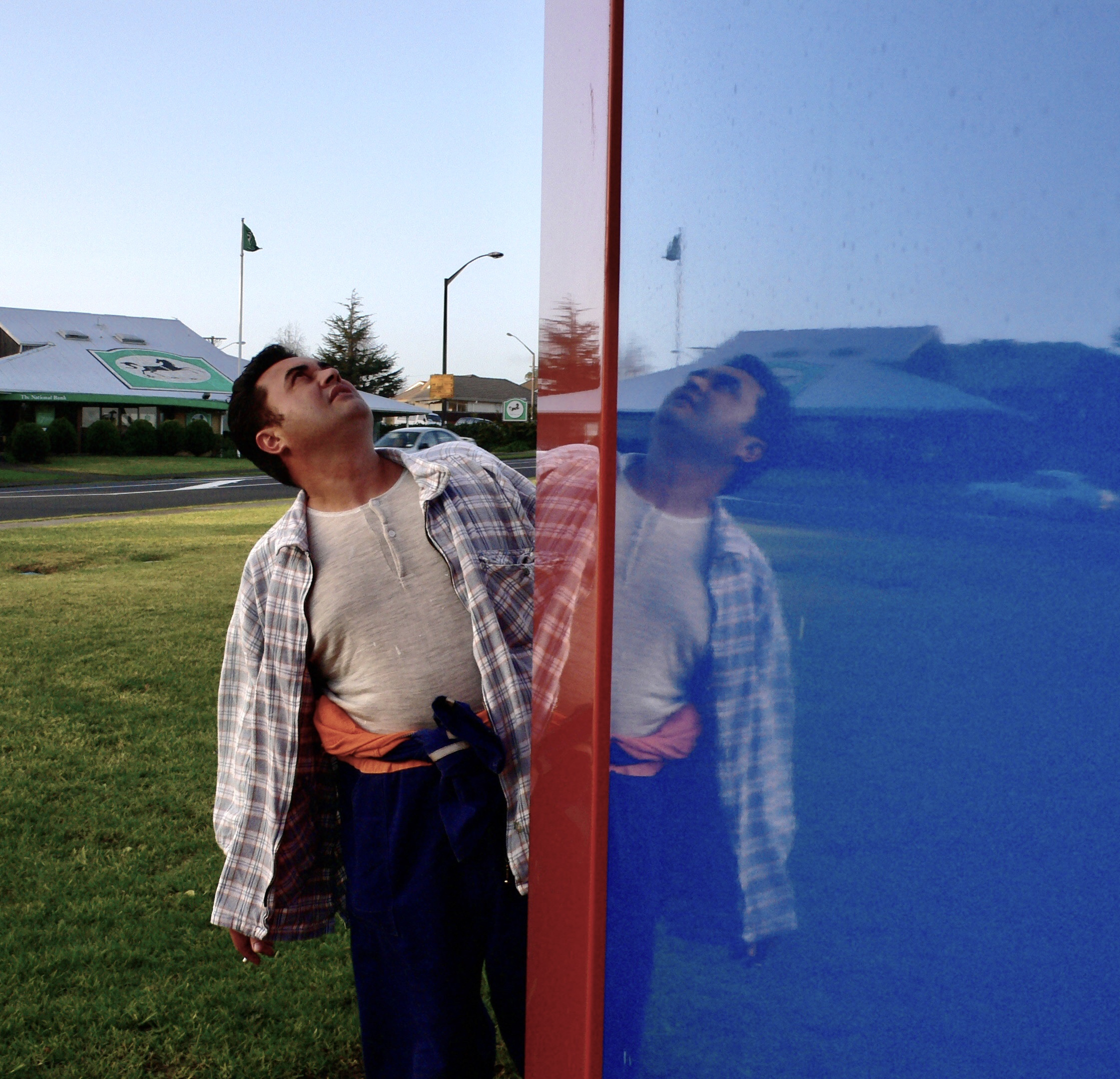
- Michael Parekōwhai, 2006
- Born: Michael Te Rakato Parekōwhai; 1968 (age 57–58); Porirua, New Zealand
- Education: Elam School of Fine Arts, University of Auckland
- Movement: Installation art, conceptual art
- Awards: Arts Foundation of New Zealand Laureate Award in 2001

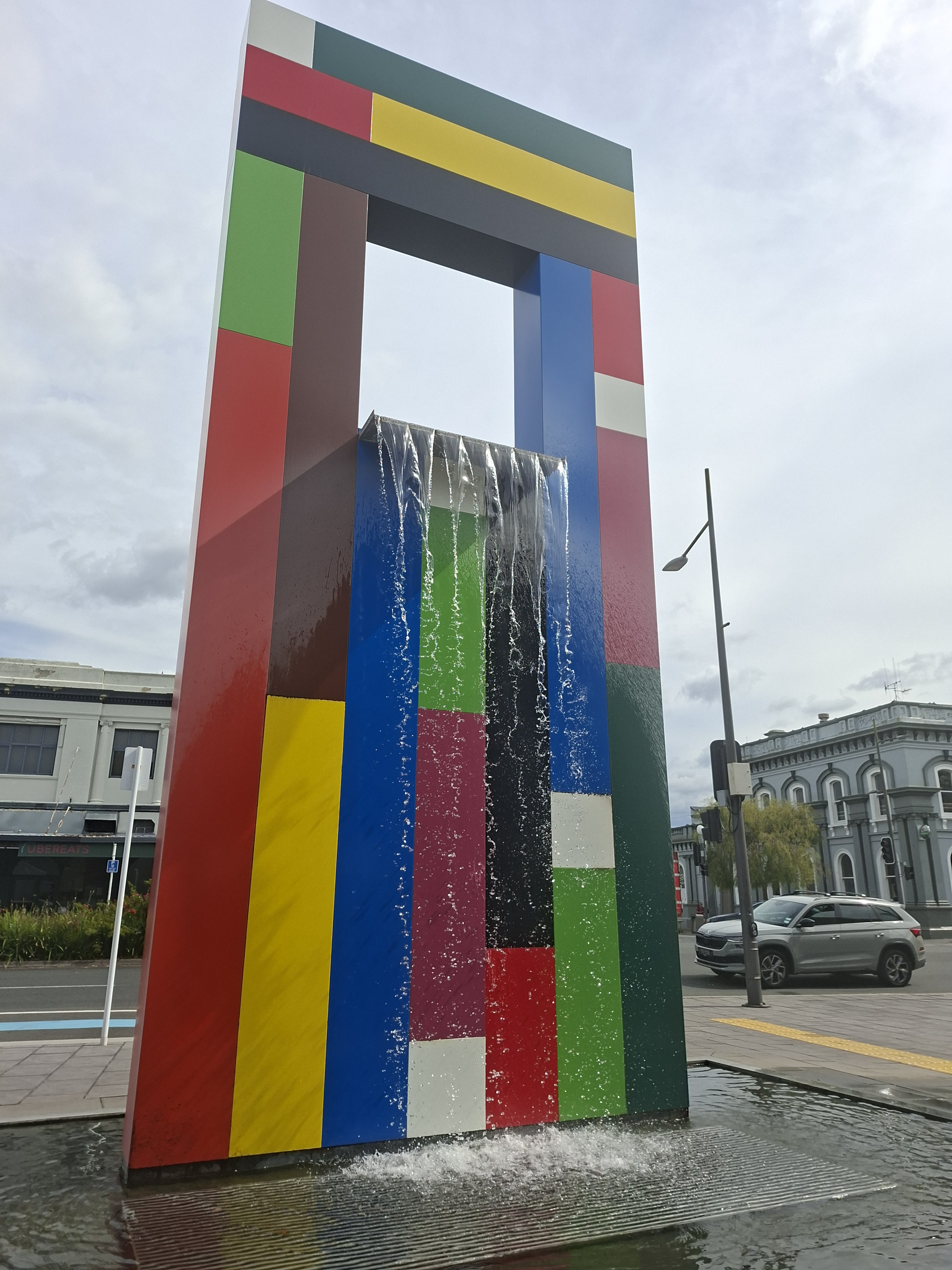
'Tongue of the Dog' in Kirikiriroa Hamilton City

Michael Te Rakato Parekōwhai (born 1968) is a New Zealand sculptor and a professor at the University of Auckland's Elam School of Fine Arts. He is of Ngāriki Rotoawe and Ngāti Whakarongo descent and his mother is Pākehā. Parekōwhai was awarded an Arts Foundation of New Zealand Laureate Award in 2001. He represented New Zealand at the 2011 Venice Biennale.

== Early life ==
Parekōwhai was born in Porirua. Both his parents were schoolteachers. He spent his childhood in Auckland's North Shore suburbs, where he also attended school. After leaving high school, Parekōwhai worked as a florist's assistant before commencing a bachelor's degree in fine arts at University of Auckland's Elam School of Fine Arts (1987–1990). He trained as a high-school art teacher before returning to Elam to complete a Master's degree in fine arts (1998–2000).

== Themes and style ==
Parekōwhai makes a variety of work across a range of media that intersects sculpture and photography. Sally Blundell, writing in the New Zealand Listener, says:

Originality, authenticity, ownership. In Parekōwhai's work, such notions blur, slipping into a collective act of translation that interweaves the canon of "high art" with cultural tradition, the handmade object with mass-produced tourist tat, the imported with the proudly colloquial.

Despite the range of Parekōwhai's output, his practice is linked throughout, both stylistically—a characteristic 'gloss' of high production value—and thematically.

Curator Justin Paton writes that Parekowhai's works "have a way of sneaking up on you, even when they're straight ahead." He continues:

Pick-up sticks swollen to the size of spears. A photograph of a stuffed rabbit who has you in his sights. A silky bouquet that rustles with politics. Seemingly serene beneath their gleaming, factory-finished surfaces, Michael Parekowhai's sculptures and photographs are in fact supremely artful objects. 'Artful' not just because they're beautifully made...but also because they manage, with a combination of slyness, charm and audacity, to spring ambushes that leave you richer.

In 2003, Parekōwhai produced Kapa Haka, a series of fifteen life-size fibreglass security guards modelled on his older brother Paratene, a security guard, and first exhibited at a dealer gallery on Auckland's Karangahape Road. The figures are cast from a single mould and identified only by colour names in te reo Māori on their ID tags; critics have read the series as an ironic play on Māori cultural performance and the prevalence of Māori men in low-paid security work.

== Notable works ==
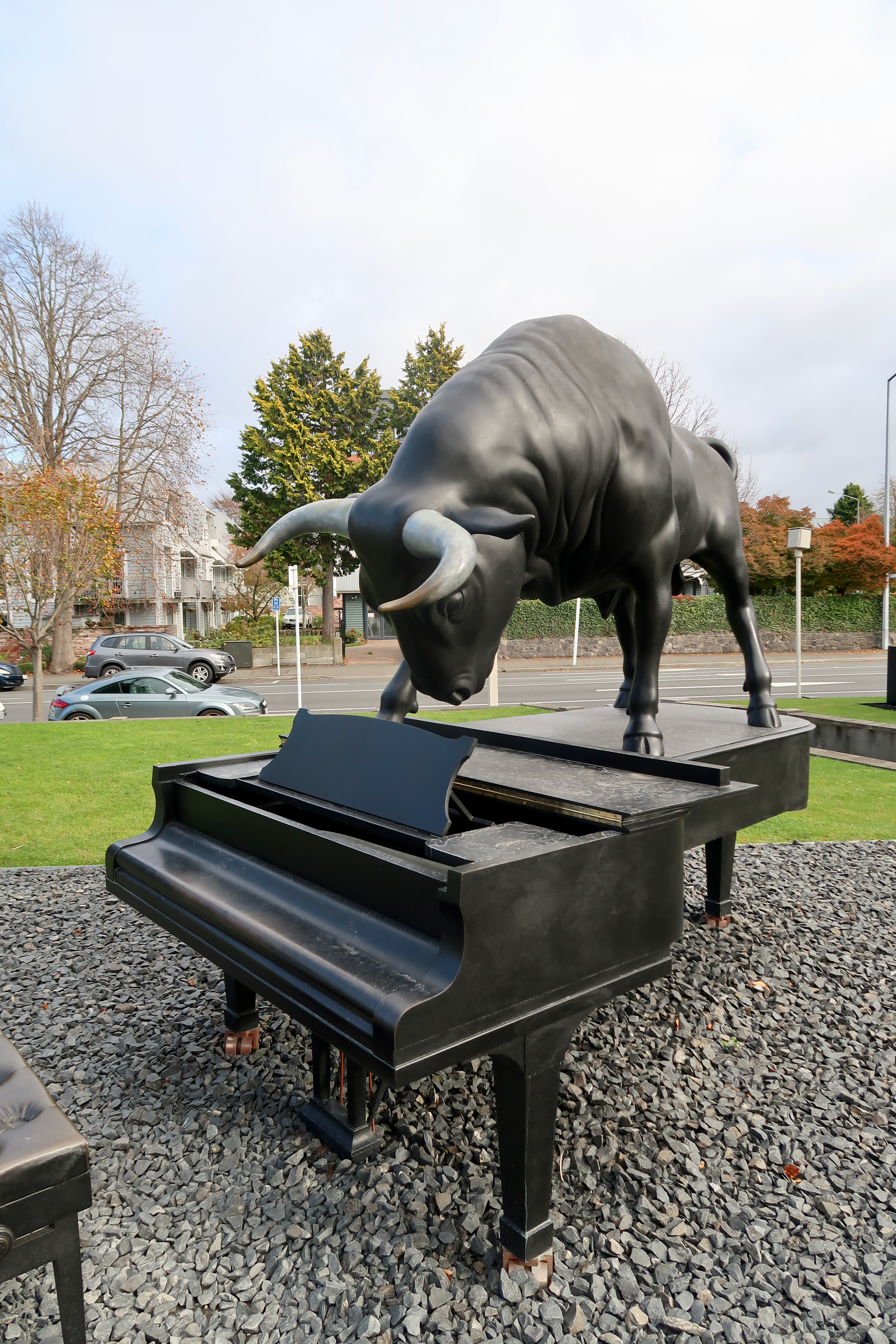
- Chapman's Homer, part of an ensemble exhibited at the 2011 Venice Biennale
  On First Looking into Chapman's Homer – an installation of two bronze bulls on grand pianos, two bronze olive saplings and the figure of a stoic security guard, his entry in 54th La Biennale di Venezia in 2011. Part of this installation, titled Chapman's Homer and consisting of a single bull atop a piano, was acquired by the Christchurch Art Gallery.
- A Peak in Darien – a bronze bull atop a grand piano. The piece sold at an auction in New Zealand for $2,051,900 in November 2021, becoming the most expensive artwork by any artist sold in a New Zealand auction.
- The World Turns – a life-sized bronze elephant tipped on its head and eye-to-eye with a kuril (water-rat), commissioned by the Queensland Gallery of Modern Art.

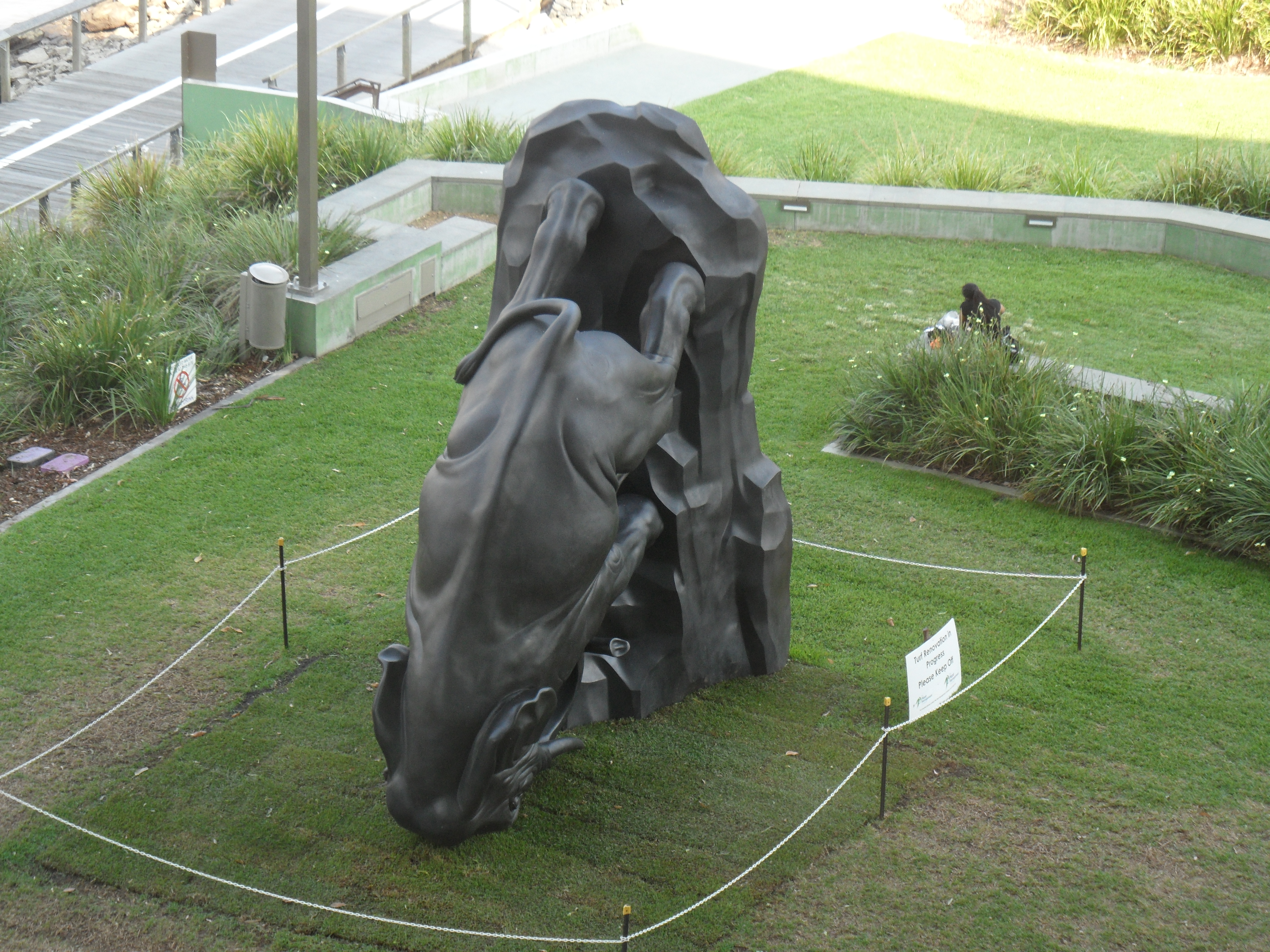
2013 Image of 'The World Turns' in the Queensland Art Gallery, by artist Parekowhai

- He Kōrero Pūrākau mo Te Awanui o Te Motu: story of a New Zealand river — an original Steinway grand piano covered in glossy red carvings. The piano is played at each of the exhibitions that it features in, for example in the 2012 Te Papa exhibition with works from Colin McCahon and Jim Allen.
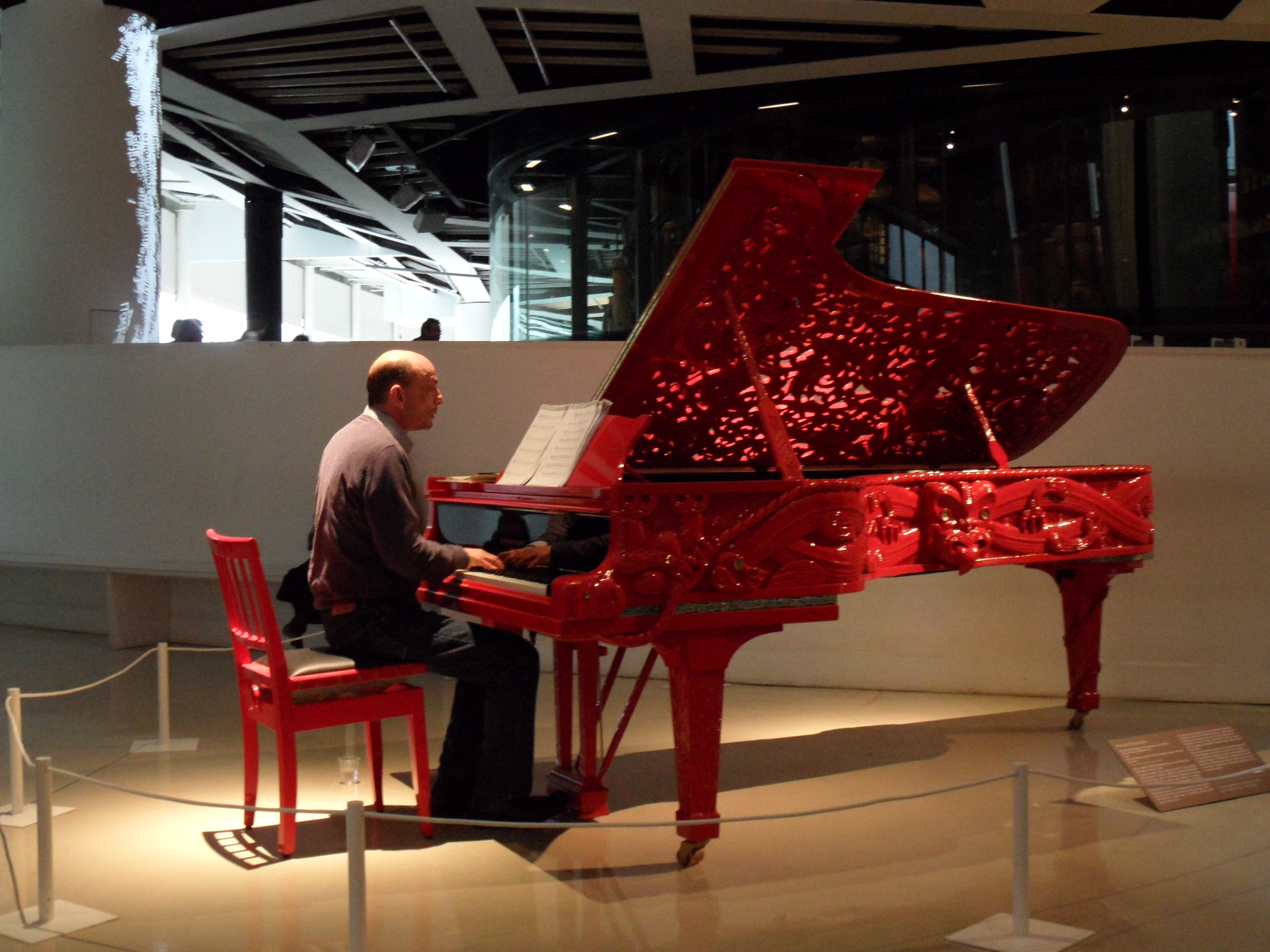
  2012 Image of 'The Red Piano' in the Quai Branly Museum in Paris, by artist Parekowhai
- The English Channel – a sculpture of Captain James Cook in a contemplative pose, held by the Art Gallery of New South Wales.
- The Lighthouse: Tū Whenua-a-Kura – Queens Wharf, Auckland
- The Tongue of The Dog, outside Waikato Museum, Hamilton, New Zealand

== Exhibitions ==
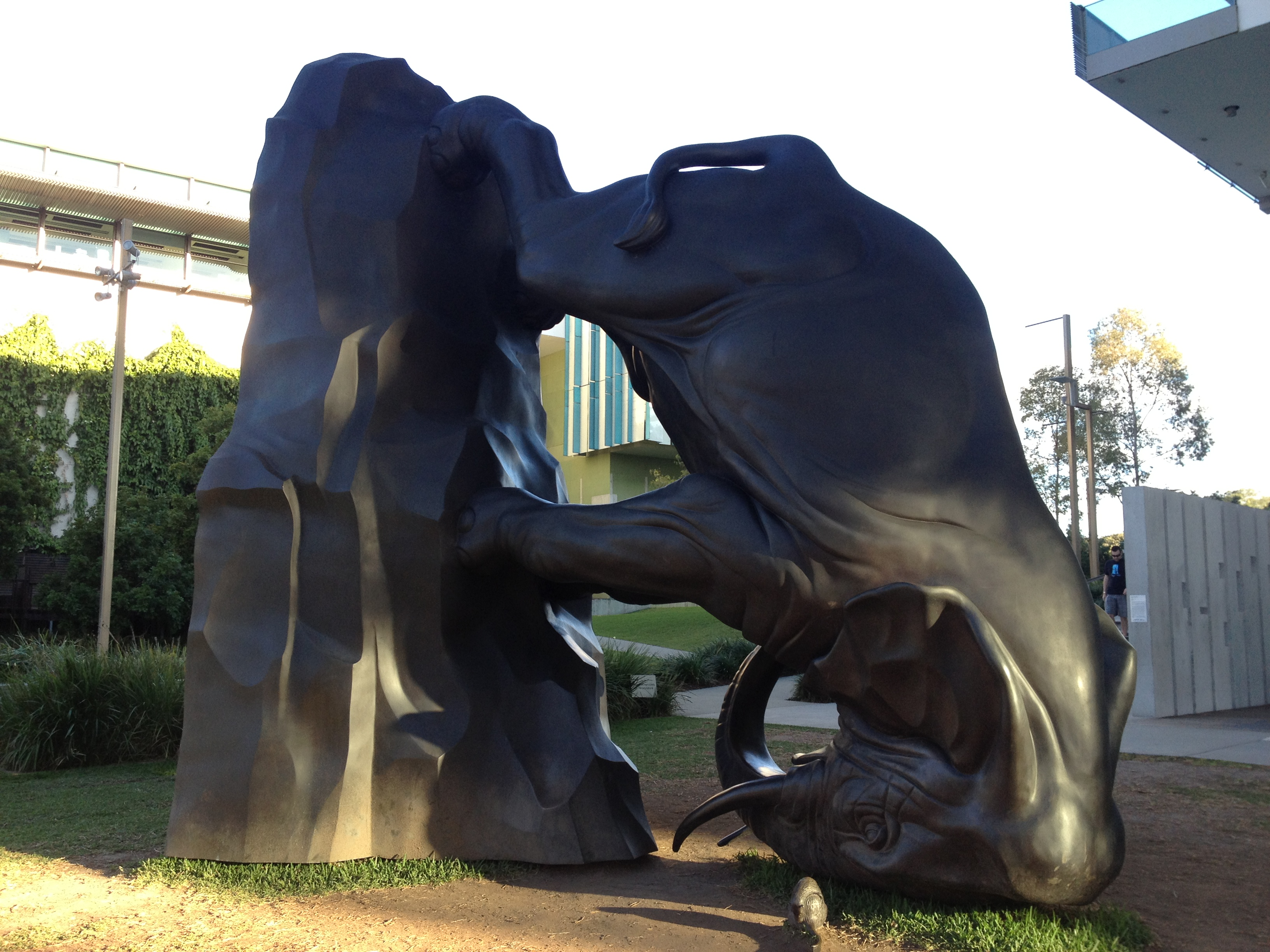
The World Turns

=== GallerySolo ===
- 2017 Détour, Museum of New Zealand Te Papa Tongarewa.
- 2015 The Promised Land Queensland Art Gallery and Gallery of Modern Art (QAGOMA), Brisbane, Australia.
- 2013 The Past in the Present, Michael Lett at the Auckland Art Fair, Auckland
- 2012 On First Looking into Chapman's Homer, Christchurch Art Gallery Te Puna o Waiwhetu, Christchurch. (Note: Also at the Museum of New Zealand Te Papa Tongarewa.)
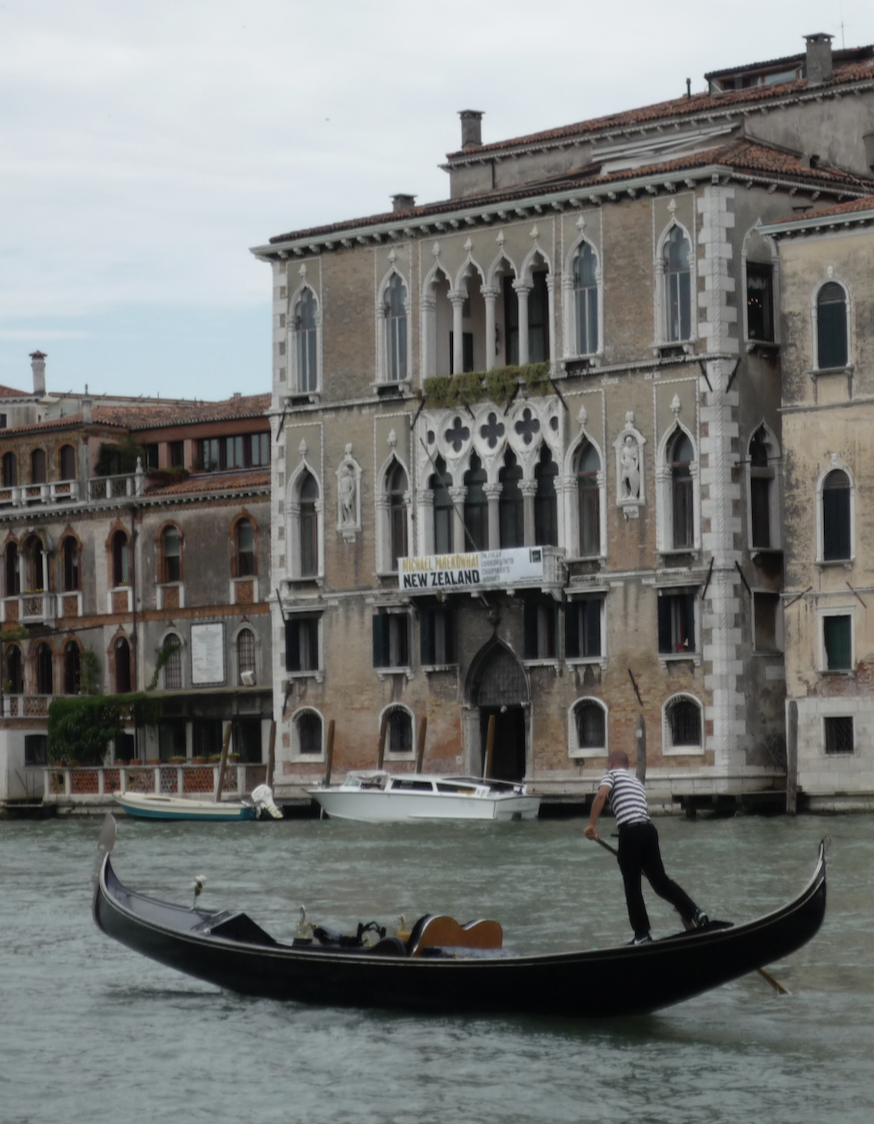
- New Zealand venue, 54th Venice Biennale 2011
  2011 54th Venice Biennale New Zealand Pavilion. Also at Musée du Quai Branly, Paris, France
- 2011 The Far Side Michael Lett, Auckland
- 2011 Te Ao Hurihuri Jonathan Smart Gallery, Christchurch
- 2009 The Moment of Cubism Michael Lett, Auckland, New Zealand
- 2009 Seldom is Herd, Roslyn Oxley Gallery, Sydney, Australia
- 2009 Yes We Are One Day Sculpture, Wellington, New Zealand
- 2008 Jim McMurtry Maori Hall / Michael Lett, Auckland, New Zealand
- 2007 The Song of the Frog, Michael Lett, Auckland, New Zealand
- 2007 My Sister, My Self Michael Lett, Auckland, New Zealand
- 1994 Kiss the Baby Goodbye Govett-Brewster, New Plymouth. (Note: Also at Waikato Museum of Art and History, Hamilton.)
- 1994 A Capella, Greg Flint Gallery, Auckland

=== Group ===
- 1990 Choice! Artspace, Auckland
- 1992 Headlands: Thinking Through New Zealand Art, Museum of Contemporary Art, Sydney
- 1995–1996 Cultural Safety City Gallery Wellington and Frankfurter Kunstverein
- 2004 'Paradise Now? Contemporary Art from the Pacific at Asia Society & Museum New York, NY
- Asia Pacific Triennial of Contemporary Art, Brisbane, Australia (APT3 1999, APT5 2006 & APT7 2012)
- 2014–2015 Black Rainbow, Te Papa, Wellington

== Selected works ==
- Atarangi 1990 view
- Kiss the Baby Good Bye 1994 view
- They Comfort Me Too 1994 view
- Poorman, Beggarman, Thief (Beggaman) 1996 view
- The Bosom of Abraham 1999 view
- Passchendaele, from the series The consolation of philosophy 2001 view
- Tua Whitu 2002 view
- My Sister Myself 2006 view
- Cosmo McMurtry 2006 view
- He Kōrero Pūrākau mo te Awanui o Te Motu: Story of a New Zealand river 2011 view
- Chapman’s Homer 2011 view
- The English Channel 2015 view

== Collections ==
Parekowhai's work is held in most New Zealand public gallery collections and a number of international museums, including the Queensland Art Gallery | Gallery of Modern Art, Brisbane, Australia and the Art Gallery of New South Wales in Sydney.

== Awards / honours ==
- Artist Laureate, Arts Foundation of New Zealand, 2001.
- Premier of Queensland Sculpture Commission, Queensland, Australia, 2011.
- Nga Toa Whakaihuwaka, Māori of the Year for Arts, 2011.
- Barfoot & Thompson, 90th Anniversary Gift to Auckland City, Waterfront Commission, 2013.
- 'Top 50 Public Art Project' awarded by Americans for the Arts, Public Art Network, 2013 Year in Review, for Blue Stratus, Phoenix Sky Harbor International Airport, Arizona, USA, 2013. In collaboration with Mario Madayag.
- Fellow of the Royal Society Te Apārangi, 2017.

== See also ==
- List of public art in Brisbane
