= Kate Newby =

New Zealand artist (born 1979)

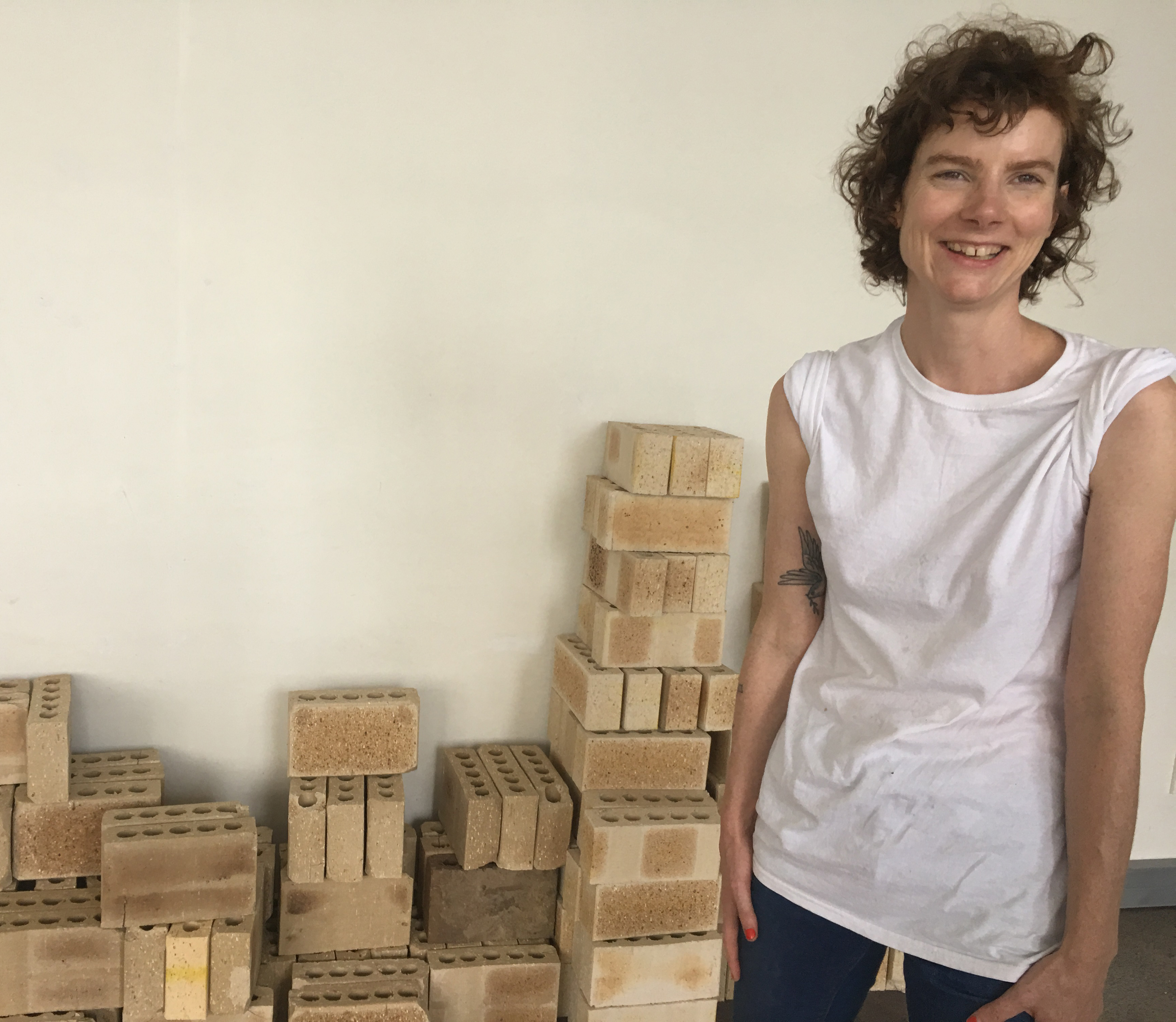
- Kate Newby setting up an exhibition in Auckland, 2016
- Born: 1979 (age 46–47); Auckland region, New Zealand
- Awards: Walters Prize
- Website: www.katenewby.com

Kate Newby (born 1979) is an artist from New Zealand.

== Background ==
Newby was born in 1979 in the Auckland region of New Zealand. She attended the Elam School of Fine Arts, receiving a BFA in 2001, an MFA in 2007, and a PhD in 2015. The title of her doctoral thesis was Casualness: it's not about what it looks like it's about what it does.

== Career ==
Newby is a mixed materials installation artist. She creates her installations based on their site and setting, often disused urban environments. Using commonplace materials such as pebbles, nails, and rope, her work explores the details of everyday life.

Newby was a member of the Auckland artist space Gambia Castle.

Newby's work has been shown in internationally renowned institutions, such as the Biennale of Sydney; Museo Nacional Centro de Arte Reina Sofia; Kunsthalle Wien; Contemporary Swedish Art Foundation; Artpace; Fogo Island Gallery; Mori Art Museum; Palais de Tokyo; Musée d’Art Moderne de Paris; Sharjah Biennial; among other institutions.

She has won the Joan Mitchell Foundation - 2019 Painters & Sculptors Grant, United States (2019); and the Walters Prize, New Zealand (2012).
