= Giovanni Intra =

New Zealand painter

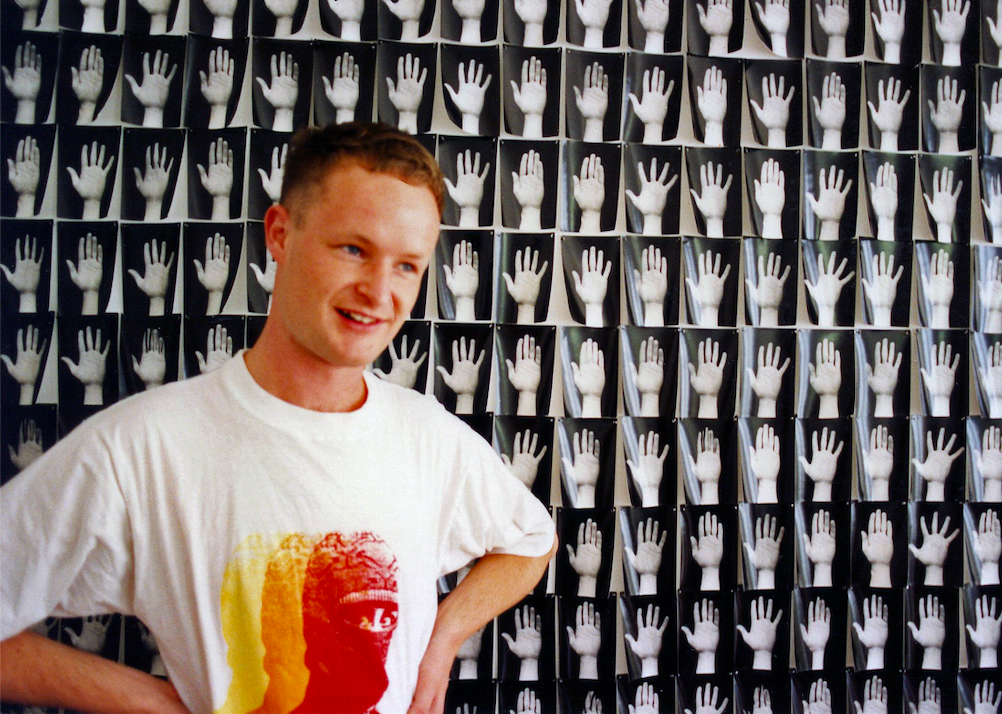
- Giovanni Intra, 1991
- Born: May 1968; Auckland
- Died: 17 December 2002 (aged 34)
- Education: University of Auckland's Elam School of Fine Arts, Art Center College of Design, Pasadena
- Known for: Sculpture, photography, art writing and director artist run gallery China Art Objects, LA
- Awards: 1996 Fulbright scholarship

Giovanni Intra (May 1968 – 17 December 2002) was an artist, writer, and art dealer who moved from his native New Zealand to the United States in 1996.

== Life ==
Intra was born in Auckland in 1968 and grew up in Tūrangi, a small town in the centre of New Zealand's North Island, and Auckland where he attended Dilworth School, a boys' boarding school. He studied at the University of Auckland's Elam School of Fine Arts, completing a Bachelor of Fine Arts with a major in sculpture in 1990 and a Master of Fine Art in 1993. Curator Robert Leonard has described him as a 'precocious student': he established a reputation as a conceptual painter while still in his teens.

Intra was fascinated by Surrealist photography, such as the work of Jacques-André Boiffard, who was also a medical photographer. In his art work he investigated medicine, which he saw to have replaced religion as a source of hope for modern day society, and the frailties of the human body. His early work integrated ideas about culture text and body from non-Western sources; some of which were derived from his travels in India c. 1988. His use of text, voice and typography presages his later engagement with theory and criticism.

Intra became part of a collective of artists that established the influential Auckland artist-run space Teststrip in 1992.

In 1996 Intra was awarded a Fulbright scholarship and travelled to Los Angeles to study at the Art Center College of Design in Pasadena. He completed a master's degree in Critical Studies in 2001. His thesis was based on Daniel Paul Schreber's 1903 book Memoirs of My Nervous Illness (1903), and used texts by artists including Salvador Dalí and Robert Smithson to "suggest ways that art writing might be reinvented."

== Art ==
After leaving art school Intra was included in a number of public art gallery exhibitions. He was one of eight artists in the exhibition Shadows of Style curated by Greg Burke and Robert Leonard at the City Gallery Wellington. Three of the four Intra works from the exhibition: Nature Morte, 365 Days and Studded Suit are now in public collections. Other public gallery exhibitions include Hospitals (1995) at Manawatu Art Gallery / Te Manawa in Palmerston North and Nine Lives Auckland Art Gallery (2003) where art curator and writer Robert Leonard described Intra’s work as, "courting a peculiar beauty; scruffy, disdainful, yet marvelous." In 2024 the Dunedin Public Art Gallery mounted the exhibition Giovanni Intra: Side effects, 'examines the inner workings of Giovanni Intra (1968-2002) as he traversed the social impacts of modern medical theory upon society.'

== Selected works ==
- Untitled (Studded Suit ) 1990 view
- Nature Morte 1990 view
- An Excellent Fetish 2 1991 view
- 365 Days 1991 view
- Clinic of Phantasms 1992 view
- The Laughing Wall 1992 view
- Needle in Glove 1993 view
- Untitled 1995 view

== Writing ==
Intra began writing about art for a magazine named Stamp while at art school in Auckland. At the time of his death Intra was West Coast editor for Art and Text, and helped edit the magazine Semiotext; his writing was published in Tema Celeste, Artforum, Bookforum and Flash Art. In September 2022 a collection of Intra's writings edited by Robert Leonard with a foreword by Chris Kraus and Mark von Schlegell and introduction by Andrew Berardini is published by Semiotext(e)

== China Art Objects ==
In 1998 Intra and fellow art student Steve Hanson, who Intra worked with in the library at the Art Center, decided to start an artist-run gallery. They found a location in Los Angeles' Chinatown district and named the gallery China Art Objects, after a sign left by a previous tenant. The gallery opened in January 1999 and was the beginning of the transformation of Chung King Road as a contemporary art scene. China Art Objects became an influential dealer gallery, an early supporter of a number of Los Angeles artists.

== Death ==
Intra died in Manhattan in December 2002, on a visit for the opening of an exhibition by one of China Art Objects' artists. In an obituary for Frieze Will Bradley wrote that Intra would be remembered "for his achievements as an artist, writer and co-founder of China Art Objects Galleries in Los Angeles, and equally for his enthusiasm, intelligence, integrity, warmth and all-around obvious decency".

In 2007 Intra's mother donated his archives to the Auckland Art Gallery. An exhibition based on the archive, Beginning in the Archive: Giovanni Intra 1968-2002, curated by Kate Brettkelly Chalmers, was staged at the Auckland gallery Artspace in 2008.

== Public collections ==
Works by Intra are held in many public art collections in New Zealand and Australia, including:

- Auckland Art Gallery
- Christchurch Art Gallery
- Dunedin Public Art Gallery
- Govett-Brewster Art Gallery
- Museum of New Zealand Te Papa Tongarewa
- National Gallery of Victoria
