= Judy Darragh =

New Zealand artist (born 1957)

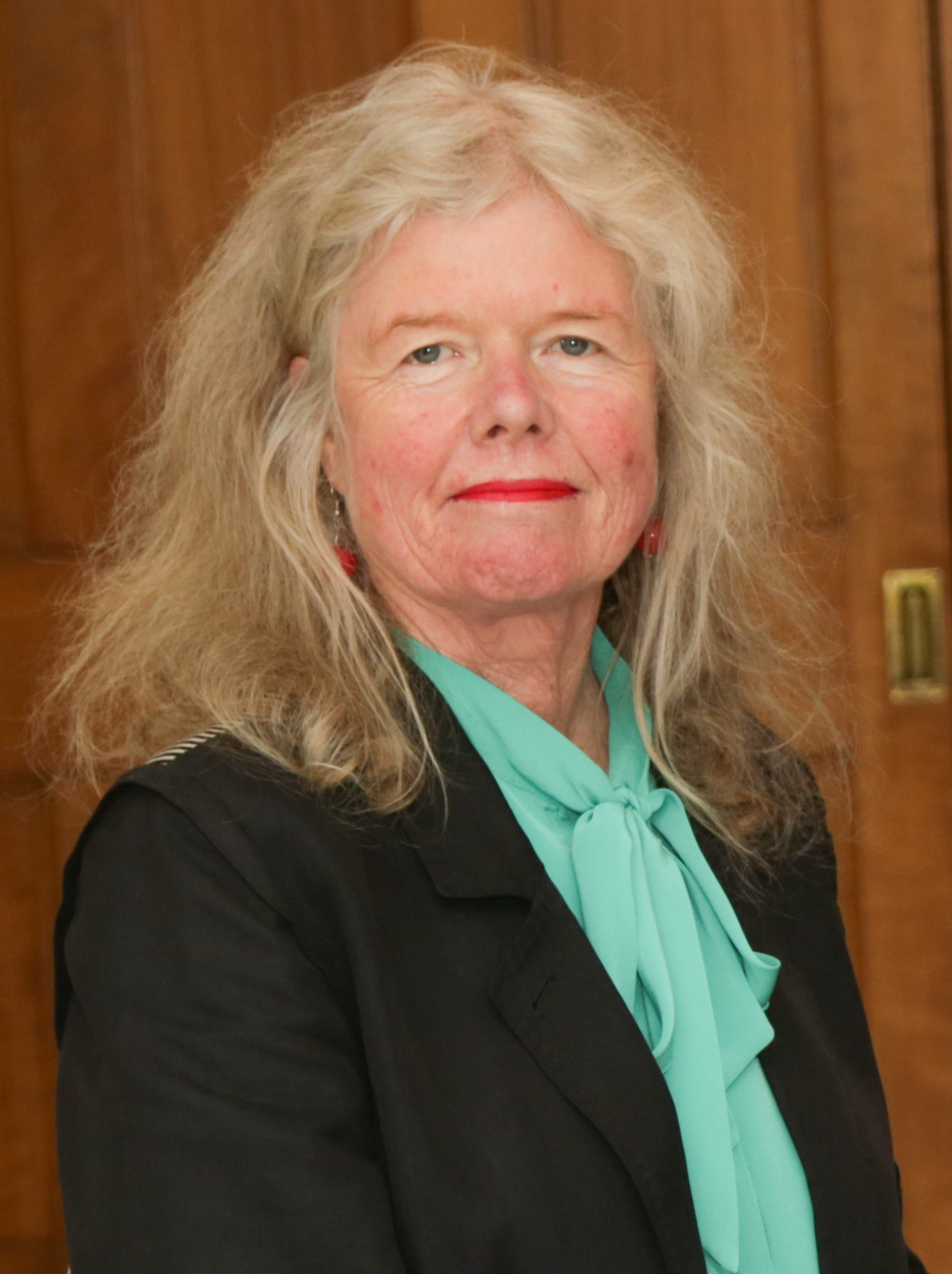
Darragh in 2020

Judith Ann Darragh ONZM (born 1957) is a New Zealand artist who uses found objects to create sculptural assemblages. She has also worked in paint and film. Darragh is represented in a number of public collections in New Zealand. In 2004, The Museum of New Zealand Te Papa Tongarewa held a major retrospective of her work titled Judy Darragh: So... You Made It?

== Early life and education ==
Darragh was born and raised in Christchurch. Her mother worked in a clothing factory and her father was a freezing worker. Darragh described being surrounded by "the joy of making" in her home environment, and from an early age she enjoyed drawing and making things from craft materials such as Fimo and pipe cleaners.

Darragh studied graphic design, graduating from Wellington Polytechnic with a Diploma in Visual Communication and Design in 1978. Deciding that she was not "cut out for the (graphic design) industry," Darragh moved to Auckland where she gained a Diploma in Teaching from Auckland Secondary School Teachers College in 1980. She has described how her teaching career has supported her art-making and provided her with a sense of freedom in her practice.

== Artist-run initiatives ==
In 1992, Darragh was one of eight artists who founded the artist-run space Teststrip in Auckland and this would run until 1997 wherein the space was closed. Darragh then went on to start Cuckoo, an artist-run project based in Auckland that was described as 'the artist-run space without a space' with four other artists in 2000.

== Pornographic imagery ==
In 2013, Darragh exhibited 'Doctor, 2013' at Gus Fisher Gallery in the show 'A Different view: artists address pornography.' The exhibition examined the impact of the pornography industry on New Zealand society and sought to open up a conversation about the 'silent business'. The artwork which she exhibited in this show (Doctor, 2013) was taken from a Hustler centrefold, then enlarged and printed onto a PVC skin which was a reference to the advertising industry. Previous work has also included assemblages with dildos (Mussell Mirror and Flicker of Life, 1987), as well as direct painting onto pornographic images using white-out.

== Comic strips ==
In the 1980s, under the alias Blossom, Darragh's comic strips were published in the New Zealand underground comic book series Strips. Her comic strips have also been published in Three Words: An anthology of Aotearoa/NZ women's comics.

== Shrine series ==
Darragh developed her signature kitsch aesthetic while living in Auckland in the 1980s, where she was working as secondary school teacher. She began making and selling domestic objects such as lamps and mirrors made from plastic plates at Cook Street Market and collecting bric-a-brac from markets, second hand shops and op shops. Her first assemblage works brought together these made and found objects into what she has described as "shrines". She was interested in exploring the distinctions between high and low culture and art and craft (particularly crafts that have been historically undertaken by women) and was influenced by Marcel Duchamp and his use of the readymade. Darragh first exhibited her art at Artspace, in Auckland's George Fraser Gallery.

== Honours and awards ==
In the 2020 Queen's Birthday Honours, Darragh was appointed an Officer of the New Zealand Order of Merit, for services to the arts.

== Collections ==
- Auckland Art Gallery
- Govett-Brewster Art Gallery
- Christchurch Art Gallery
- Dunedin Public Art Gallery
- Museum of New Zealand Te Papa Tongarewa
- Waikato Museum Te Whare Taonga o Waikato
- Lincoln University Collection, Christchurch
- Sarjeant Gallery Te Whare o Rehua, Whanganui
