= Sarah Hudson (artist) =

New Zealand contemporary artist and photographer

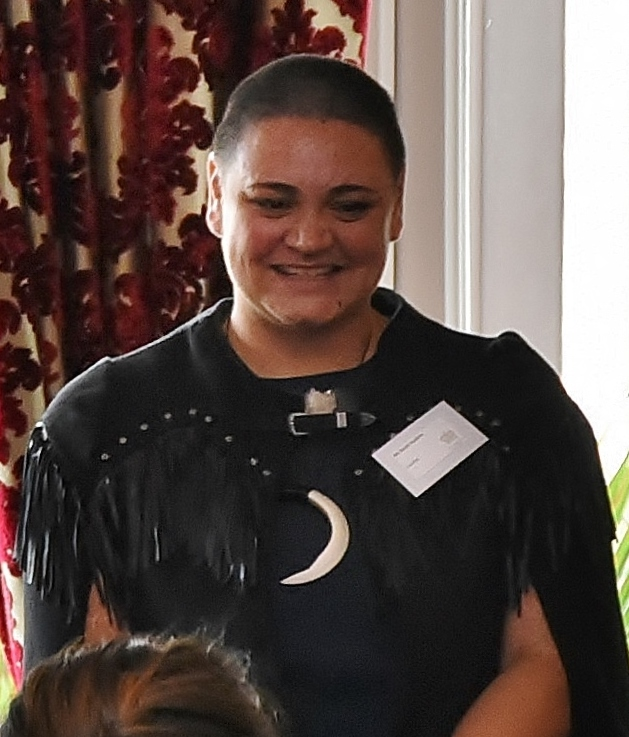
- Sarah Hudson with Mataaho at Venice Biennale Youth Forum
- Born: Sarah Peti Sian Hudson; 1986 or 1987 (age 39–40)
- Education: Master in Fine Arts with Distinction
- Alma mater: Massey University, Wellington
- Occupations: Artist, researcher
- Awards: 2022 Arts Foundation Laureate
- Website: https://www.sarahhudson.co.nz/

Sarah Peti Sian Hudson (born 1986 or 1987) is a New Zealand artist and researcher of Ngāti Awa, Ngāi Tūhoe, and Ngāti Pūkeko descent based in Whakatāne.

== Career ==
Hudson began her artistic practice by completing a Master in Fine Arts with Distinction through Massey University Wellington in 2010. On the whole she has exhibited both individually and in the mana wahine Mataaho Collective for national and global audiences. The collective have worked together since 2012 with 'single authorship' and recently were awarded the Golden Lion at the Venice Biennale in 2024.

In her physical practice she is classified as a lens focused artist, however this doesn't cover the breadth of her works. Hudson's photography, performance, installation, Raranga (weaving), video, and sculpture works all convey variations of the artist's thematics: mātauranga Māori, mana wahine, media, gender and sport, tino rangatiratanga, whakapapa, matemateāone, play, whenua (land), and the idea of different connections with others.

Another core aspect of her creative works is often their location, interaction with their respective environment, and incorporation of natural, earth sourced materials. This interest led to Hudson becoming a co-founder of Kauae Raro Research Collective in 2019. Together the members delve into and investigate Māori paint and dye methods using earth pigments, often connecting their intentions back to the roots of Indigenous knowledge and using earth pigments 'as an art material, in ceremony and as rongoā (medicine).'

In addition to creating and exhibiting her own work, in 2020 she was the exhibitions curator for Te Kōputu te whanga a Toi, Whakatāne Museum and Arts.

== Exhibitions ==
Group shows
Date	Title	People	Medium	Location	Source
2011	Maiden Aotearoa	Sarah Hudson, Aimee Ratana, Vicky Thomas, Suzanne Tamaki	Photography	Deane Gallery, City Gallery Wellington	
2017	All Lines Converge	Darcell Apelu, Edith Amituanai, Wendy Bornholdt, Jordana Bragg, Mary-Louise Browne, Ruth Buchanan, L. Budd, Sarah Buist, Fiona Clark, Yvonne Coleman, Fiona Connor, Dale Copeland, Jane Dove, Charlotte Drayton, Luise Fong, Marti Friedlander, Catherine Griffiths, Gil Hanly, Christine Hellyar, Li-Ming Hu, Maree Horner, Sarah Hudson, Sonya Lacey, Tessa Laird, Vivian Lynn, Alison Maclean, Merata Mita, Joanna Margaret Paul, Biljana Popovic, Nova Paul, Shona Rapira Davies, Lisa Reihana, Pauline Rhodes, Dorothy Richmond, Marie Shannon, Susan Te Kahurangi King, and Lauren Winstone	Multimedia print installation	Govett-Brewster Gallery	
2019	And only sea	Mata Aho Collective	A public commission	Wellington	
2021	Toi Tū Toi Ora: Contemporary Māori Art	Mata Aho Collective	– – –	Auckland Art Gallery	
2021	Help Yourself	Turumeke Harrington, Grace Ryder, Sarah Hudson, Saskia Leek, Kristin Leek, and Greta Menzies	Multimedia installation Hudson, Reunion, 2021, Ngāti Pūkeko stained cotton and Ngāti Maru ki Hauraki whenua	Enjoy Gallery	
2022	Manatū Ahu Matua in Pollen in the Trough	Sarah Hudson, Madison Kelly, and Rebecca Hawkes	Multimedia Installation Hudson, Manatū Ahu Matua (2014), digital photograph	Wormhole Gallery, Edgecumbe	
2023	Piece for The Polyphonic Sea	Antonia Barnett-McIntosh, Andrew Beck, Ruth Buchanan, The Estate of L. Budd, Sione Faletau, Samuel Holloway, Sarah Hudson, Sonya Lacey, Nova Paul, Sriwhana Spong, and Shannon Te Ao	Multimedia installation	Bundanon, NSW, Australia	

Other group exhibitions with Hudson's contributions can be found with the Mataaho Collective.

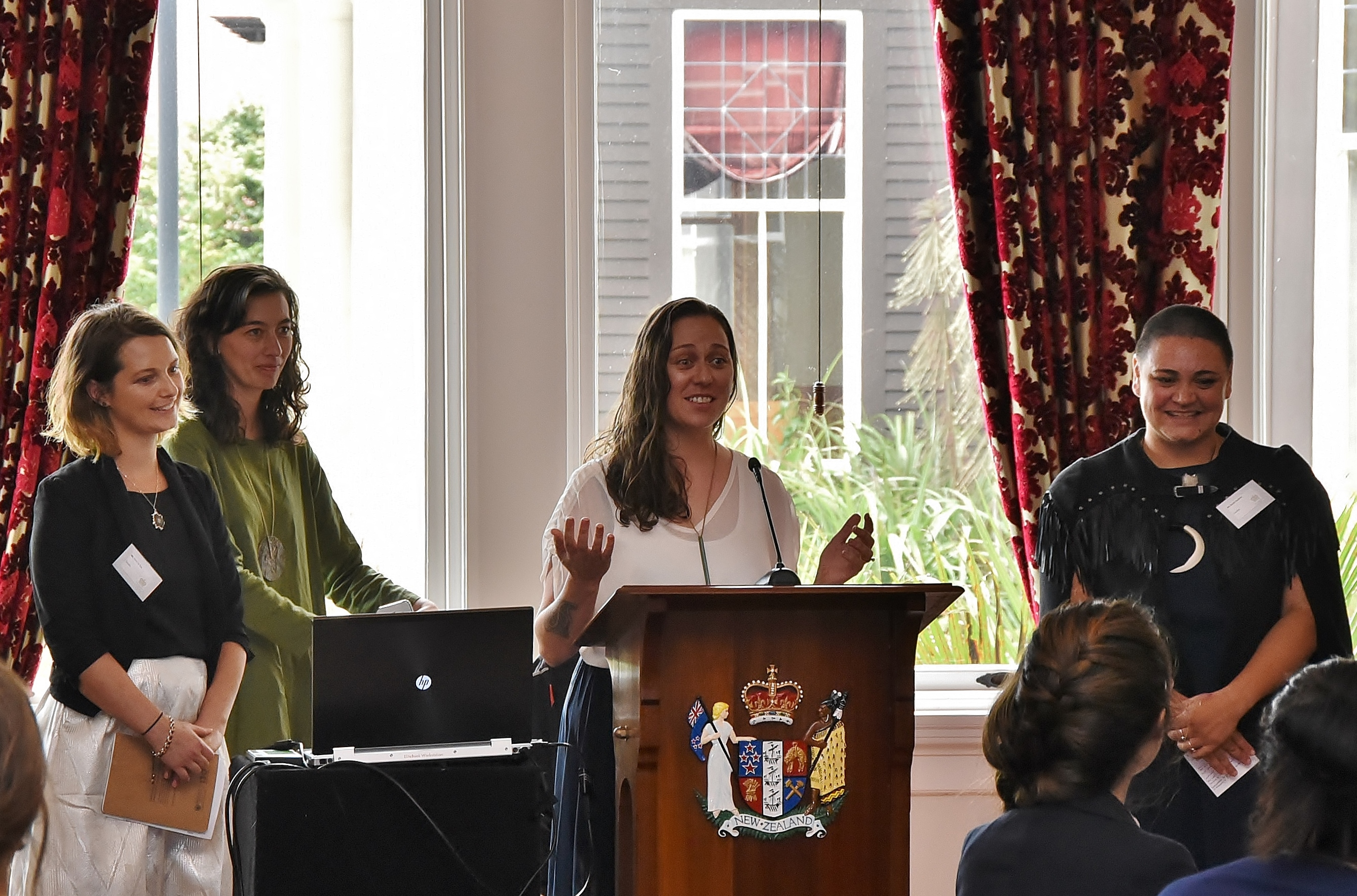
The Mataaho Collective - Erana Baker, Sarah Hudson, Bridget Reweti and Terri Te Tau at the Venice Biennale Youth Forum

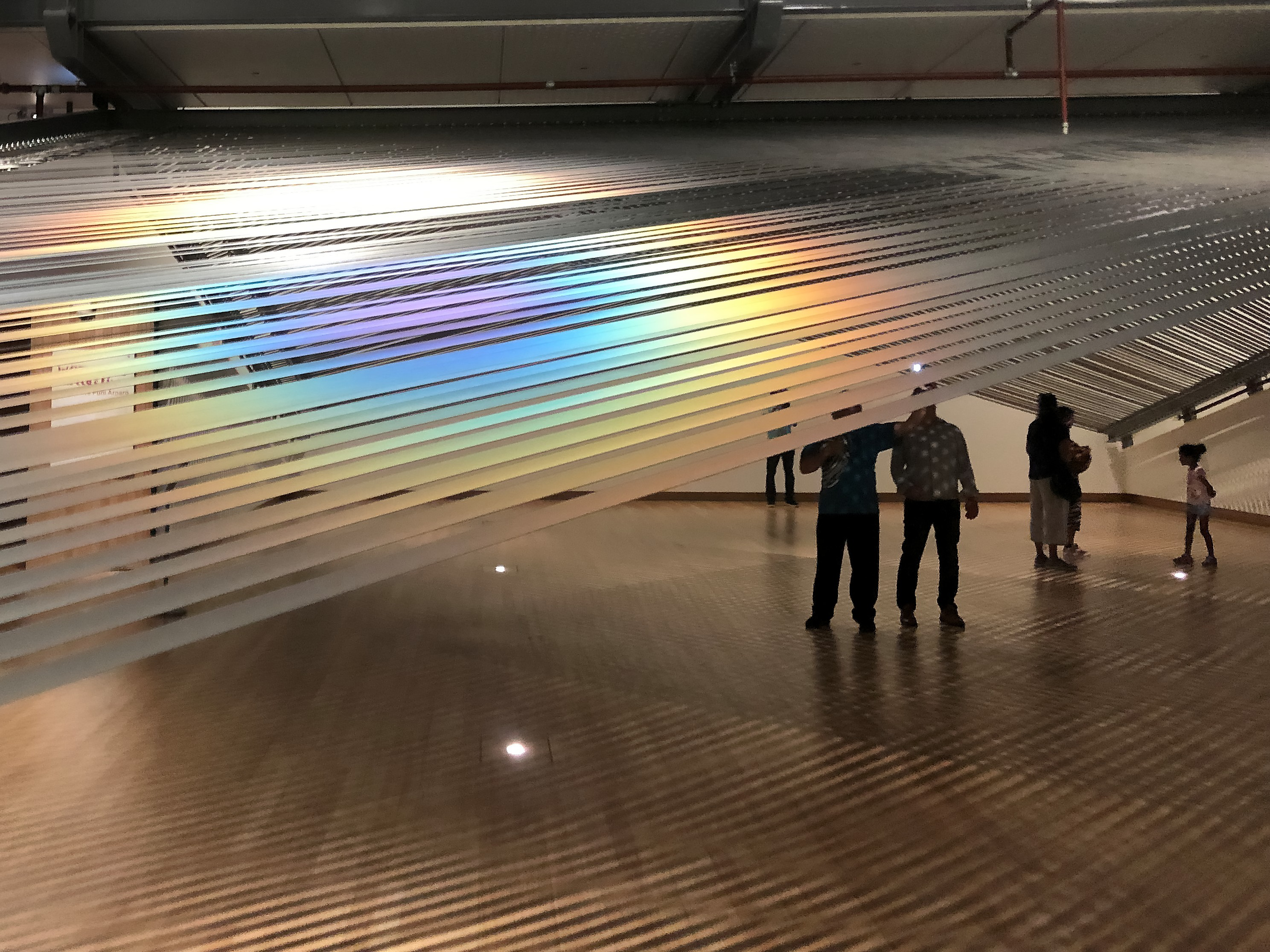
Takapau, an artwork by Mataaho Collective shown at Te Papa, January 2023

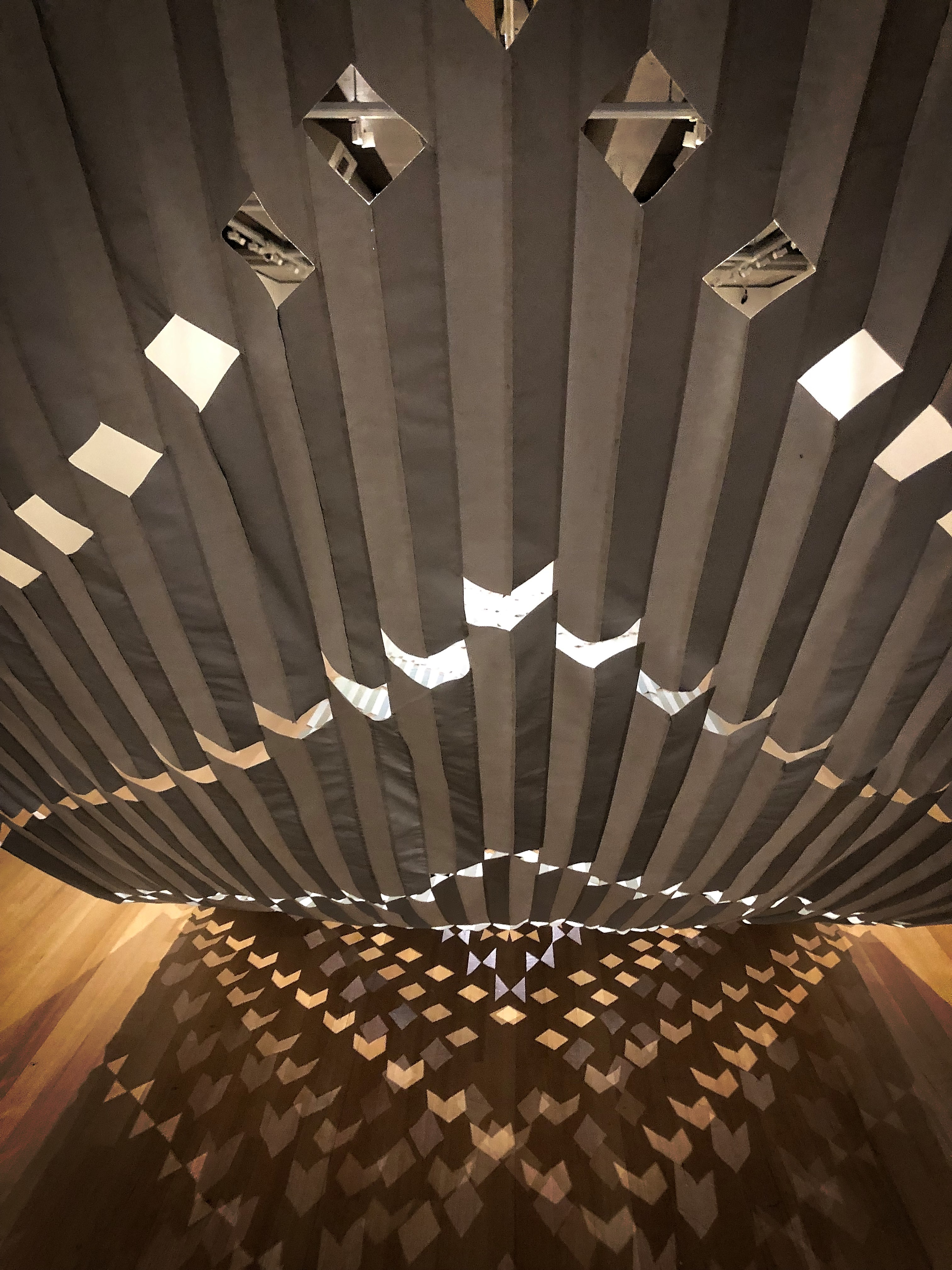
Kaokao #1, an artwork by Mataaho Collective shown at Te Papa,January 2023

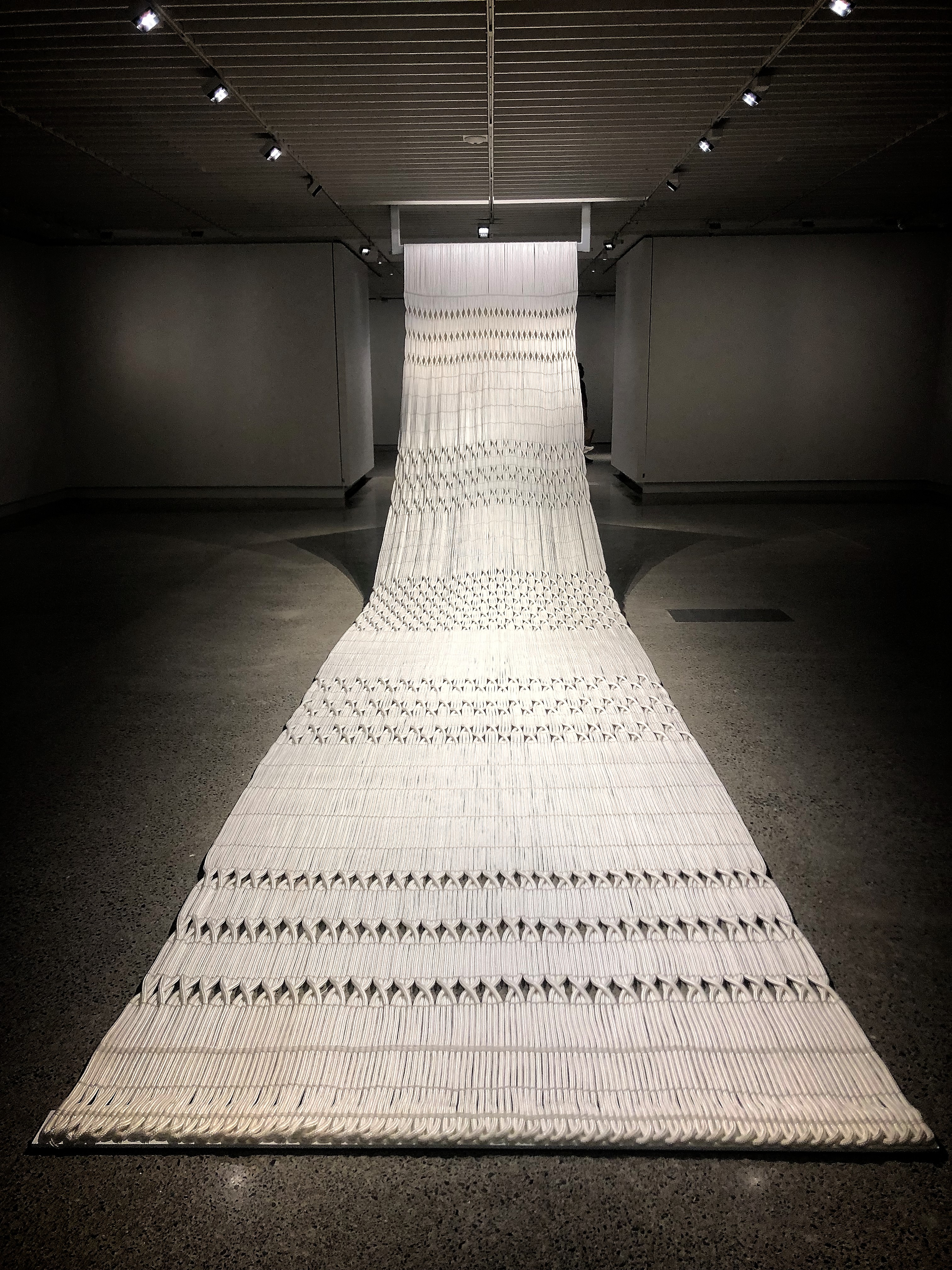
Tauira, an artwork by Mataaho Collective shown at Te Papa, January 2023

Solo shows
Date	Title	Medium	Location	Source
2014	Manatū Ahu Matua	12min 33sec Single channel, digital video, colour, sound	Circuit, Artist Moving Image	
2015	Ariā – Ōhiwa	10sec Single channel, digital video, colour, silent	Circuit, Artist Moving Image	
2016	Putanga	3min 34sec Single channel, digital video, colour, sound	Circuit, Artist Moving Image	
2016	Rachael and Indigo in Harakeke	Photograph	– – –	
2016	Karakia (Ritual Chants)	2min 9sec Single channel, digital video, colour, sound	Circuit, Artist Moving Image	
2018	X-marks	– – –	Waitangi Treaty Grounds and Museum, Waitangi	
2018	Harirū	1min 50sec Single channel, digital video, colour, sound	Circuit, Artist Moving Image	
2018	Palm Arms	2min 38sec Single channel, digital video, colour, sound	Circuit, Artist Moving Image	
2020	Mana Whenua	Installation	– – –	
2021	Reunion	Installation with earth pigment incorporated	Enjoy Gallery	
2021	Tūhoe whenua, Tūhoe whakapapa	Painting	– – –	
2021	Waikaremoana Rainbow	Pigment painting	– – –	
2021	Clay is a Māori material	Unfired, polished whenua mediums	– – –	
2022	re:place	Installation with earth pigment incorporated	Blue Oyster Gallery	
2023	Reconnect	10min HD video, colour, sound (Music by Kahu Kutia and Sylvan Spring) (Cinematography by Rachel Anson)	Auckland Pride 2023 & Christchurch Art Gallery	
2024	he tuahu ki a Ukurangi	Installation included in Heipūkarea, a celebration of atua wāhine	Aronui Indigenous Arts Festival 2024	

== Workshops and events ==
- October 2016: Artist Talk on Blakdot Gallery's exhibition Ōpōtiki, New Zealand's First Drone-Friendly Town
- January 2020: Headwear with Sarah Hudson, aligning with Māori Moving Image: An Open Archive at Christchurch Art Gallery (August 2019 – January 2020). Participants worked with the artist to make headwear protecting you from identifying technologies like cameras and facial recognition to bring ideas of public versus private versions to the forefront of the audience's minds.
- March 2020: The Art of Looking, a workshop to teach children how to see and interpret contemporary art, at Te Kōputu te whanga a Toi, Library and Exhibition Centre, Whakatāne.
- 2021: Spoke at Pigments Revealed, an international earth pigment symposium.
- July 2021: In Conversation: Kōkōwai in contemporary art practice, artist talk by Hudson and Nikau Hindin about how they use kōkōwai as a contemporary artistic medium, at Govett-Brewster Art Gallery.

== Publications ==
- Mana Whenua, 2020

A 55 page piece on interactions between art and mātauranga by 11 Māori artists during the rise of Matariki in 2020.

- The making of bread, etc. with Zoe Thompson-Moore in As Needed, As Possible, April 2020
- Contributor to The Vessel Magazine, Love as a Rebellious Act on Ron Te Kawa's textile explorations with te ao Māori.

== Projects ==
- Hudson took part in the conclusive exhibition of the Wild Pigment Project, curated by the project's founding director Tilke Elkins. It was shown from 17 September to 3 December 2022, displaying over 20 global artists' earth pigment works. The project was started by Elkins in 2019 with the purpose of exploring intersections of artists using natural materials in their work and artists' own stories, ultimately investigating the relationship between land and artist around the world. As part of their participation in the project, artists donate to a pigment subscription service that operates monthly called 'Ground Bright.' This service financially benefits the running of the project, and portions of the funds are also gifted to land and cultural heritage organisations.
  - Their exhibition was held at Form & Concept Gallery, and 22% of its profits ended up being donated to the Institute of American Indian Arts. All the exhibiting artists involved were: Melonie Ancheta, Stella Maria Baer, Karma Barnes, Julie Beeler, Brittany Boles, Amanda Brazier, Lorraine Brigdale, Catalina Christensen, Iris Sullivan Daire, Nina Elder, Caitlin French, Heidi Gustafson, Sarah Hudson, Ashlee Weitlauf, Lucille Junkere, Melissa Ladkin, Thomas Little, Daniela Naomi Molnar, Marjorie Morgan, Sydney Matrisciano, Nancy Pobanz, Teri Power, Adi Blaustein Retjo, Caroline Ross, Joshua Rudder, Natalie Stopka, Scott Sutton, and Hosanna White
- She contributed work to He Tohu to Trust Horizon's Light up Whakatāne Festival
- Hudson curated an exhibition correlating with her publication Mana Whenua which was on display from February to April 2022 at Wormhole Gallery, Edgecumbe. Works included were by: Ayesha Green, Sarah Hikuroa, Nikau Hindin, Ana Iti, Kahu Kutia, Sian Montgomery-Neutze, Bronte Perry, Nathan Pohio, Bridget Reweti, Raukura Turei, and Cora-Allan Wickliffe
- She curated M/other, 20 April 2019 – 7 August 2019 at Whakatāne Museum and Arts
- As exhibitions curator at Te Kōputu a te whanga a Toi—Whakatāne Library and Exhibition Centre, Hudson presented an embroidery piece by Maungarongo Te Kawa (Ngāti Porou) in an exhibition called Corners of the Heart. The works were called Grandparents (2020), How Does It Feel To Swim Towards Danger (2020), The Natives Must Be In Awe (2019), and Thoughts Forming In The Void (2018).

== Awards ==
- 2022 Arts Foundation Te Tumu Toi Laureate (with the Mataaho Collective)
- 2023 Molly Morpeth Canaday Painting & Drawing Awards, Hudson received a Local Artist Merit award sponsored by 4Artsake Gallery from guest judge Kelcy Taratoa, for her work entitled Kōkōwai.

== Residencies ==
- 2012: Enjoy Contemporary Art Space residency
- 2022: Caselburg Trust Creative Connections residency (3 months)

Hudson's time in this artist residency was spent in the Broad Bay area of Dunedin for its abundance of earth pigments and paint binders like tree gum and honey. Through her creative process of collection, grinding and mixing of various dyes and paints she prepared work as a result of her residency, but most significantly was able to whakapapa back to her ancestors through the generational practice of rock art. Her completed works were presented in her final exhibition, which when it opened coincided with Hudson's organisation of the first national symposium for Māori earth artists.

- 2025: Naoshima, Japan residency

In 2025, Hudson was the first artist invited from Aotearoa to complete an artist residency in Naoshima, Japan and present her work in the Setouchi Triennale, a prominent international art festival in Japan opened April 2025. She spent one month on an island of the Seto Inland Sea in Japan, which is known as a place that provides a cultural and contemporary feel for global artists to gather and collaborate, producing work and research inspired by her surroundings in Megijima to exhibit at the Setouchi Triennale. The island is one of many classified as belonging to the Benesse Art Site in Naoshima, with its dedication to the sector described as evident through contemporary art and architecture on display. Jude Chambers, executive director of McCahon House who assisted in evolution of this opportunity, quoted the following regarding Hudson's experience: "Creating a new work and exhibiting in the Setouchi Triennale 2025 will expand and extend her networks and share Aotearoa's unique art and culture with audiences internationally."

The Setouchi Triennale was established in 2010 with the intention of promoting local communities, and environments.Artists were asked to present work in natural environments or abandoned buildings in the area. Hudson named and themed her collection of work Reconciliation and included the following pieces: The Stones Remember and I Listen (watercolour paintings with earth pigments from land she whakapapas to in Moutohorā, and indigo pigment from the Kagawa prefecture), stone works In my teeth, the DNA of cliffs, and The taste of old stories, used pebbles from Megijima, and a video work called Belonging.

The works she produced were also exhibited in Aotearoa. Belonging I and II along with an AI poem were shown at Kia Mau Festival, Wellington from 2 to 15 June 2025. Furthermore Belonging I and II, five watercolour pieces and photographs of Moutohorā in collaboration with Whakatāne Museums and Archives, the poem, and new sculptures based on archaeologies of wāhi tapu on Moutohorā, were all shown at Te Kōputu in Whakatāne from 4 July to 6 September 2025.

Additionally during her time in Japan, Hudson completed a residency at Miki Junior High School, Japan and taught students there about natural dyeing methods.

== Lectures ==
- She presented an Ockham lecture titled Serious Fun on 22 July at Objectspace where she made examples of three Māori artists, Maungarongo Te Kawa, Ayesha Green, Turumeke Harrington "who employ fun, play and frivolity to explore pūrakau."
