= Blue Oyster Art Project Space =

Blue Oyster
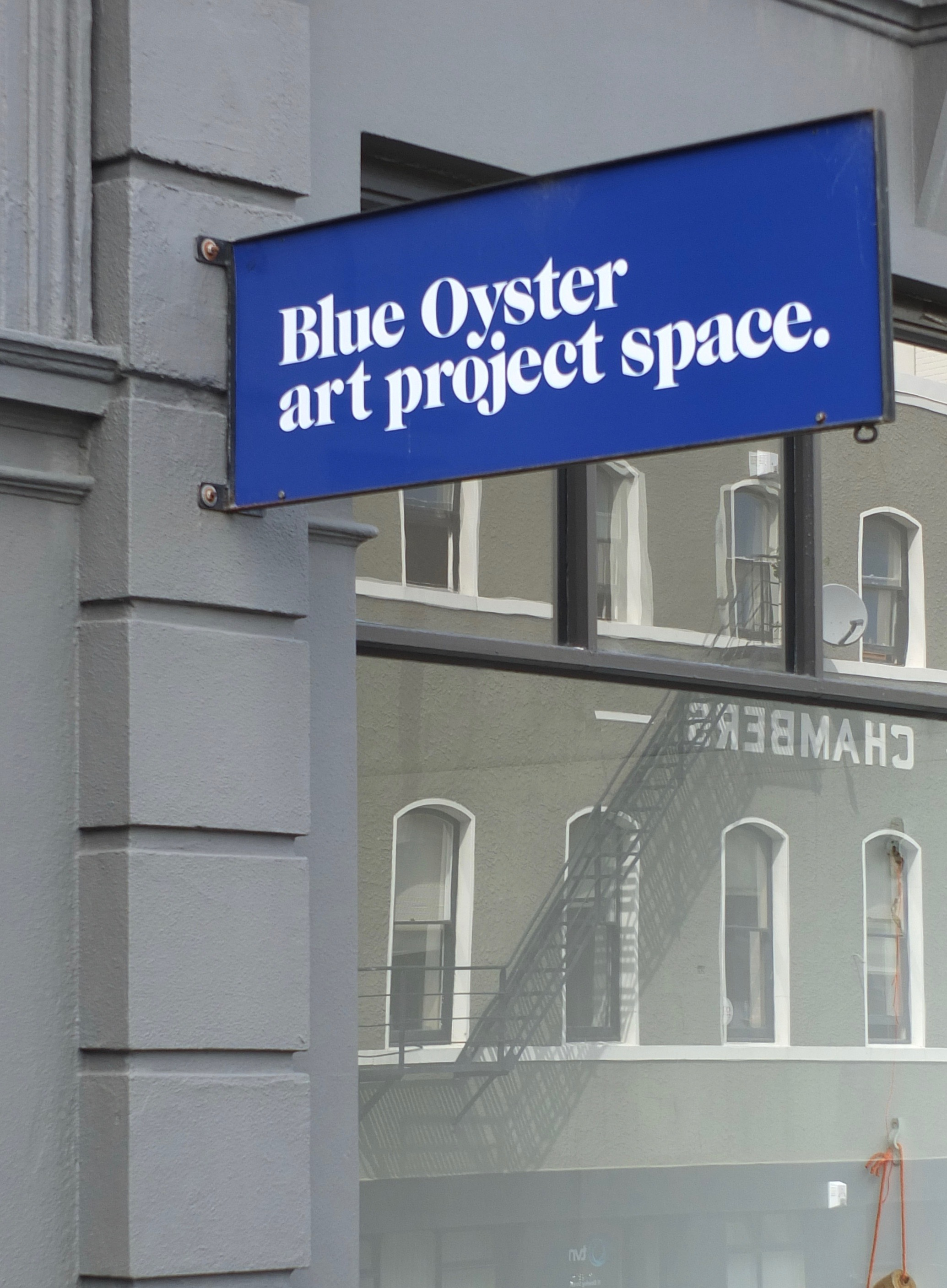
- Established: 29 June 1999
- Location: Dunedin, New Zealand
- Coordinates: 45.87664°S 170.50333°E
- Type: Contemporary art gallery
- Founder: Steve Carr
- Director: Simon Palenski
- Website: www.blueoyster.org.nz

Blue Oyster, located in Dunedin’s city centre, is a space that presents contemporary experimental art projects. Blue Oyster included over 1,000 artists in more than 270 projects over its first 10 years and it continues to provide a space for artists to present their work.

== History and operations ==
As a not for profit organisation, the gallery serves the local and national art community as a venue for exhibiting alternative and non-commercial art work that offers an environment of criticality, support and learning to emerging and experimental artists.

The space opened in 1999 after the project spaces Honeymoon Suite and Everything Incorporated closed down. The founding artists Wallace Chapman, Kate Plaistead, Emily Barr, Steve Carr, and Douglas Kelaher set up the Blue Oyster Arts Trust, and once the trust was established it took over the venue of Everything Incorporated. Blue Oyster's aim is to broaden an interest and understanding of contemporary art by “acting as an incubator for new ideas in contemporary art involving practitioners from all media”. The project space presents a dynamic public programme that includes discussion sessions, workshops, artist’s talks and performances.

Blue Oyster has a strong history in extending support to young artists building their careers in the New Zealand arts scene and promoting new and innovative art practices. As the gallery and Trust have evolved, they have continued to assist, promote and support emerging artists, writers, curators and practitioners with 12 exhibitions, 10 events (talks, screenings, performances), 2 workshops, 2 residencies, and 3 publications per year. The gallery's director from 2017–2020 was Grace Ryder, and Hope Wilson took on the position in 2020.

== Funding ==
Blue Oyster is funded by Creative New Zealand and the Dunedin City Council, along with a range of other sponsors, patrons, stakeholders and supporters in and around the Dunedin community. The space is part of a nationwide network of non-profit organisations that support emerging and experimental artists including: Enjoy Public Art Gallery, The Physics Room, Artspace, Objectspace, and CIRCUIT Artist Film & Video Aotearoa – most of which started out as artist-run spaces.

== Exhibition history ==
Notable exhibitions include: an early exhibition by Julian Dashper (2000); an early exhibition by Séraphine Pick titled Display (2000); several early exhibitions by Steve Carr (1999–2001); an early exhibition by 2010 Walters Prize winner Dan Arps (2001); a work called "Walk" by Kate Fitzharris in 2011, a solo exhibition by Pauline Rhodes (2002); a group exhibition including Sarah Jane Parton (2005); solo exhibitions by 2016 Walters Prize nominees Shannon Te Ao (2013) and Nathan Pohio (2003); and grand re-opening solo exhibition by Judy Darragh (2013). Recently, Blue Oyster has also shown Duty Free Art (2014) by internationally renowned artist Hito Steyerl with the support of Artspace Auckland.
