= Erena Baker =

New Zealand artist and photographer

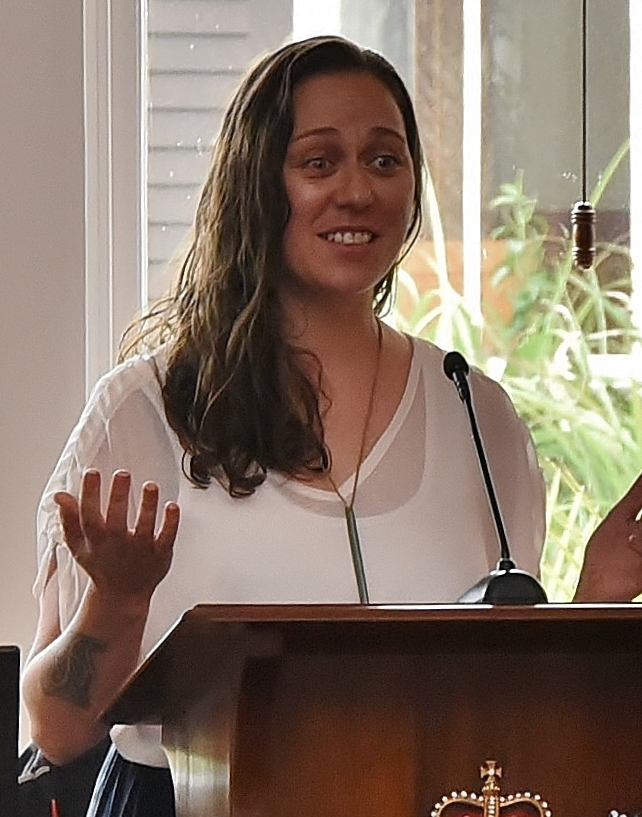
- Baker at the Venice Biennale Youth Forum in 2017
- Born: 1984 (age 41–42)
- Education: Massey University

Erena Mary Baker (born 1984) is a New Zealand visual artist. Baker uses photography to explore ideas of commemoration and remembrance within Māori culture. She is also a member of Mata Aho Collective, a group of four artists known for their large-scale art works. As part of the collective their work has been exhibited internationally at the Royal Academy of Arts and the National Gallery of Canada.

== Education ==
In 2009, Baker graduated with a Master of Māori Visual Arts degree from Toioho ki Āpiti School of Māori Studies at Massey University. Her thesis was on the importance of photography in Māori culture. She now works within the school as a lecturer and is based in Palmerston North.

== Exhibitions ==
Baker's first solo exhibition, entitled Pepeha, was held at Thermostat Gallery in Palmerston North.

Her photographic work Tango Whakaahua produced in 2006 is part of Auckland Art Gallery's permanent collection. The work consists of 50 self-portraits of Baker wearing a cloak by weaver Kohai Grace.

Baker was one of the founding members of the Mata Aho Collective which formed in 2012. The group consists of Sarah Hudson, Bridget Reweti and Terri Te Tau. The first work the collective produced was Te Whare Pora in 2012. This was shown at the Adam Art Gallery and was subsequently acquisitioned into the Victoria University of Wellington Art Collection.

As part of the Mata Aho Collective Baker's work has been exhibited internationally at the National Gallery of Canada in Ottawa. The show, Àbadakone, Feu Continuel, Continuous Fire, showcased a range of works from contemporary indigenous artists.

In 2020, Baker's work was included in the Auckland Art Gallery Exhibition Toi Tū Toi Ora. Her individual photography work was included alongside that which she produced with the Mata Aho Collective.

== Personal life ==
Baker is of Ngāti Toa Rangatira, Te Ātiawa ki Whakarongotai and Te Āti Awa descent.
