= Nova Paul =

New Zealand Māori filmmaker

Nova Paul (born 1973) is a New Zealand Māori filmmaker of Te Uri Ro Roi and Te Parawhau/Ngāpuhi descent who makes Kaupapa Māori films (films made by Māori for Māori).

== History ==
Paul completed a Bachelor of Arts in art history at the University of Otago in 1994 and a Master of Arts at Auckland University of Technology in 2000. After graduating, Paul taught studio moving image and art theory at Auckland University of Technology. In 2023 she was appointed a curator at Auckland Museum. Paul is also prominent as an Indigenous Rights researcher.

== Methodology ==
Initially Paul’s work made use of an early film-making process known as three-colour separation. Using this technique she created multi-layered images in what for a number of years became her signature style. Art critic Tessa Laird described the result. ‘By superimposing three exposures of the same subject the flow of time’s stream is tripled…’ Paul’s ongoing interest in meshing the technical aspects of film production with content led her to the Caffenol development process. In her 2023 film Ngā Pūrākau Nō Ngā Rākau – Stories from Trees, for instance, local water and leaves from the trees she was filming were used in the developing process.

== Selected filmography ==
- 2006: Pink and White Terraces
- 2007: Our Future is in the Air
- 2008: The World of Interiors
- 2010: This is not Dying Using colour separation Paul invokes the Māori belief that although people are important, their lives on earth are brief and it is the land that remains. Sound track by Ben Tawhiti
- 2015: Still Light A film responding to the poetry of Joanna Paul.
- 2016: Te Wai o Te Ora
- 2017: Surplus Reality

Props and Gestures A film using archival footage of the Gadini Family in Bergamo, Italy.
The Week before Spring. Sound track by Bic Runga.

- 2018: Ko Ahau Te Wai Ko Ahu

Te Ripo

- 2022: Hawaiki. Children play outside their school in a make-believe place they have named Hawaiki. The film was shot by cinematographer Darryl Ward.
- 2023:Ngā Pūrākau Nō Ngā Rākau – Stories from Trees. The film was shot on Aotea (Great Barrier Island) and in Whangārei, places where Paul shares whakapapa and connections with communities.

NOTE: A number of Nova Paul's films can be viewed on Circuit

== Festivals ==
- 2006: New Zealand International Film Festival in the programme fps curated by Phil Dadson and Sam Hamilton.
- 2010: International Film Festival Rotterdam
- 2015: London Film Festival
- 2017: 10th Anniversary Screening Artists’ Film International, Whitechapel Art Gallery, London.
- 2023: Sundance Film Festival

== Selected exhibitions ==
- 2010 Charley Nijensohn and Nova Paul, Whitechapel Gallery, London
- 2011: Rencontres Internationales, Centre Pompidou, Paris
- 2016: All Lines Converge, Govett-Brewster Art Gallery, New Plymouth curated by Sophie O’Brien based on lines from a Joanna Paul poem.

Haus der Kulturen der Welt, Berlin

- 2019: From the Shore Pataka Art + Museum, Porirua curated by Iona Gordon-Smith and Reuben Friend. The exhibition was based on film-maker Barry Barclay's concept of indigenous cinema being like ‘a camera on the shore reversing the direction of the colonial gaze.’
- 2021: NaadohWater. Shohe inaugural Indigenous Triennial at the Winnipeg Art Gallery/Qaumajuq, Canada and at Pataka Art + Museum, Porirua New Zealand.
- 2022: Maori Moving Image ki Te Waiwheti developed by the Christchurch Art Gallery and Dowse Art Museum curated by Bridget Reweti and Melanie Oliver.

Tai Timu! Tai Pari! The Tide Flows. A film programme curated by Shannon Te Ao to accompany his exhibition Matarau.
Toi Tū Toi Ora curated by Nigel Borell included Paul’s 2010 film This is not Dying. This film was shown again in the same year in Borell’s exhibition Puhi Ariki which opened the Wairau Māori Art Gallery in the Hundertwasser Art Centre.

- 2023: Ngā Pūrākau Nō Ngā Rākau – Stories from Trees shown at City Gallery and Whangārei Art Museum simultaneously.

== Publications ==
- 2008: PLACE: Local Knowledge and New Media Practice.
- 2012: 2012 Form Next to Form Next to Form. The publication re-presents Paul's 16mm film This is not Dying.

== Governance roles ==
Nova Paul is a trustee for her hapū, Artspace Aotearoa (interim-chair 2022-23) and a Haerewa, Auckland Art Gallery Toi o Tāmaki member.
