= Stella Brennan =

New Zealand artist, curator, and essayist

- Born: 1974 (age 51–52); Auckland, New Zealand
- Education: University of Auckland
- Known for: installation art
- Website: stella.net.nz

Stella Brennan (born 1974) is a New Zealand artist, curator, and essayist.

== Background ==
Brennan was born in 1974, in Auckland, New Zealand. She gained a Master of Fine Arts (MFA) in 1999 from Elam School of Fine Arts at the University of Auckland. Brennan lives in Auckland.

== Career ==
Brennan is a mixed media installation artist. She utilises a variety of materials including found objects, video projection, and sculpture. Her work explores concepts of space and time between individuals and address issues such as industrialisation, colonialism, and technology.

Brennan has published as an art critic and appeared in ArtAsiaPacific, the New Zealand Listener and Art New Zealand. She has also worked as an essayist for artists Patricia Piccinini and Ann Veronica Janssens.

In 2001 Brennan was the artist in residence at Artspace Sydney and in 2004 she was the inaugural Digital Artist in Residence at the Department of Screen and Media Studies at University of Waikato. In 2007 she received a fellowship at Apex Arts in New York.

Brennan is a co-founder of Aotearoa Digital Arts and was co-editor, with Su Ballard, for the Aotearoa Digital Arts Reader.

In 2006 she was a finalist for the Walters Prize, with her installation Wet Social Sculpture, first shown at St Paul St Gallery, Auckland.

Work by Brennan is held in the collection of the Chartwell Collection in the Auckland Art Gallery Toi o Tāmaki.

Brennan is represented by Trish Clark Gallery.

=== Exhibitions ===
Brennan has exhibited widely in New Zealand and internationally in Australia, Asia, North America, Europe.

- Another Green World. 2022, Artspace, Sydney.
- Tommorw Never Knows. 2004, The Physics Room, Christchurch.
- Memory Hole. 2005, Trish Clark Gallery, Auckland.
- Envoy from Mirror City and No Stairway. 2006, Starkwhite, Auckland.
- No More Gaps. 2007, Starkwhite, Auckland.
- South Pacific. 2008, Two Rooms, Auckland.
- Second Child. 2008, Starkwhite, Auckland.
- The Middle Landscape. 2009, Starkwhite, Auckland.
- every room i have ever been in. 2012, Audio Foundation, Auckland.
- Black Flags. 2016, Trish Clark Gallery, Auckland.
- the song remains the same. 2022, Trish Clark Gallery, Auckland.
- Stella Brennan: Ancestor Technologies, 2023, City Gallery Wellington Te Whare Toi, Wellington, curated by Kirsty Baker.

=== Group exhibitions ===
- The Walters Prize 2006, 2006, Auckland Art Gallery Toi o Tāmaki, Auckland.
- Among the Machines. 2013, Dunedin Public Art Gallery, Dunedin, curated by Su Ballard.
- Truth + Fiction. 2015, Trish Clark Gallery, Auckland.
- Slow Burn: Women and Photography | Ahi Tāmau: Māreikura Whakaahua. 1 March 2026 - 31 January 2027, Museum of New Zealand Te Papa Tongarewa, Wellington.

=== Publications ===
- The Aotearoa Digital Arts Reader, 2008, edited by Stella Brennan and Su Ballard, Auckland: Clouds Publishing.
- Thread Between Darkness & Light - Stella Brennan, 2024, edited by Stella Brennan, Haru Sameshima and Mary Trewby, essays by Kirsty Baker, Lissa Mitchell, Su Ballard, and Ross Galbreath, Auckland: Rim Books.

=== Curated exhibitions ===
- Nostalgia for the Future. 1999, Artspace NZ, Auckland.
- Dirty Pixels. 2002–2003, Artspace NZ, Adam Art Gallery, Dunedin Public Art Gallery and Waikato Museum of Art and History.
- Cloudland: Digital Art from Aotearoa New Zealand. 2008, The Substation, Singapore, co-curator.
