= Mataaho Collective =

Group of four New Zealand Māori artists

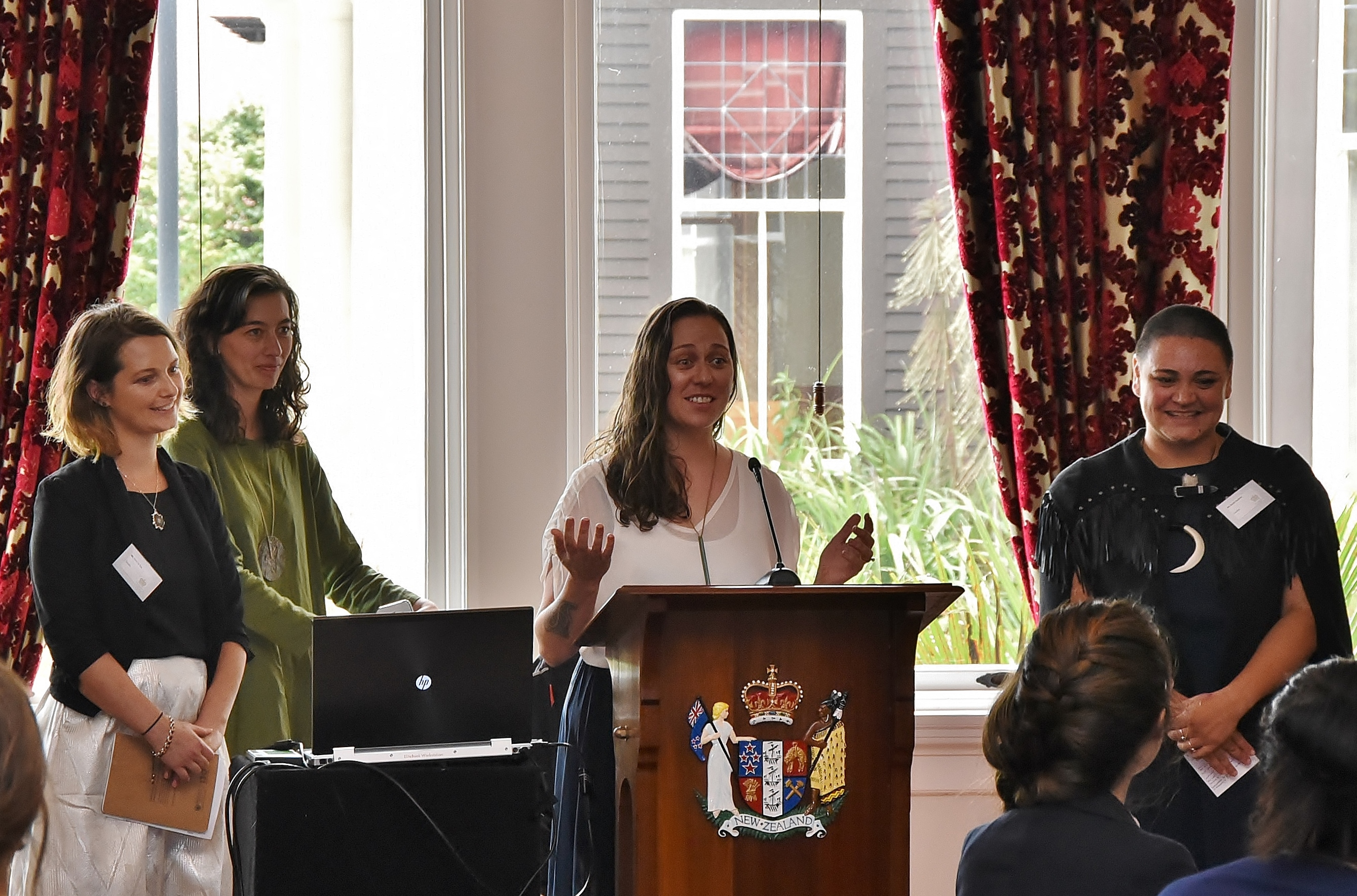
- The Mataaho Collective at the Venice Biennale Youth Forum in 2017
- Formation: 2012
- Headquarters: New Zealand
- Website: www.mataahocollective.com

The Mataaho Collective is a group of four New Zealand artists: Erena Baker, Sarah Hudson, Bridget Reweti and Terri Te Tau. They are known for their large scale fibre-based artwork. In 2024 the Mataaho Collective received the Golden Lion award at the Venice Biennale.

== Formation of collective ==
The artists of Mataaho are Māori women artists, listed here with their Māori iwi affiliations: Erena Baker (Te Atiawa ki Whakarongotai, Ngāti Toa Rangātira), Sarah Hudson (Ngāti Awa, Ngāi Tūhoe), Bridget Reweti (Ngāti Ranginui, Ngāi Te Rangi) and Terri Te Tau (Rangitāne ki Wairarapa). They are all graduates of the Toioho ki Āpiti Māori Visual Arts programme at Massey University. In 2011, the artists attended two hui (meetings) held at Poupatete Marae in Halcombe which gave them an opportunity to exchange ideas in a kaupapa Māori (Māori-focused) space.

The Mataaho Collective was established in 2012, when the group were invited to undertake a residency at Enjoy Public Art Gallery where they made their first work together:

In early 2012 [Enjoy curator] Claudia Arozqueta indicated through conversation with some of the artists that she would like to have Māori women participate in the Enjoy Public Art Gallery Summer residency, which was to culminate in an exhibition. During development for the residency, the four artists decided to make a single work together, naming themselves Mataaho Collective. Their first work, Te Whare Pora, was inspired by customary weaving spaces as sites of wānanga for sharing and learning reigned over by the atua wahine Hineteiwaiwa. They treated the residency like a contemporary whare pora, proposing to eat, sleep and create the work all within the gallery.The contemporary kaupapa of the work was extended by the nature of the materials the collective worked with. During the month of the Enjoy Summer Residency, twenty black faux mink blankets were deconstructed and reconfigured to create a 5 x 10 m installation that covered the gallery floor space and stood up against the back wall at 90 degrees.

Since then, Mataaho has continued to work with concepts and materials relevant to contemporary Māori culture.

== Use of materials ==
Materials used by the collective include faux mink blankets, synthetic marine rope, reflective tape and tarpaulin. The group have stated that "As a rule, we like to address accessibility in our work through our use of material. In using ubiquitous materials that can be found both domestically and industrially, we hope that the recognisability can act as an initial ‘in’ to the work."

For the work Te Whare Pora the collective used faux mink blankets, describing these domestic objects as "an instantly recognisable modern Māori material. Mink blankets are readily accessible and warm, commonly used on marae, and often gifted at significant birthdays." For the work Hautāmiro the group processed harakeke into dyed thread, as well as using merino wool, fencing staples, and electrical fencing insulators.

== Major works, commissions and awards ==
In 2017, Mataaho exhibited Kiko Moana at Documenta 14. The large scale work, made of sewn blue plastic tarpaulins, was installed at the Hessisches Landesmuseum. The work was later acquired by the Museum of New Zealand Te Papa Tongarewa and later exhibited at the Royal Academy in London in 2018, as part of the Oceania exhibition;.

Their 2019 commission for the National Gallery of Canada's exhibition Àbadakone | Continuous Fire | Feu Continuel, titled AKA, was nominated as a finalist in the 2021 Walters Prize. After the disruption of the COVID-19 pandemic, the collective presented another work, Atapō (created in collaboration with Maureen Lander) which was commissioned for the 2020 Auckland Art Gallery exhibition Toi Tū, Toi Ora.

In August 2021, Mataaho won the Walters Prize with the work Atapō. The juror of the prize was the British-born curator Kate Fowle.

In September 2022, Mataaho received an Arts Foundation of New Zealand Laureate Award, titled the My Art Visual Award.

In 2024 Mataaho Collective were part of the Venice Biennale in Italy in the International Exhibition, Stranieri Ovunque – Foreigners Everywhere. They won the Golden Lion, for the Best Participant, the highest prize.

== Exhibitions ==
Exhibitions include:

- Adam Art Gallery Te Pātaka Toi at Twenty (2020)
- Honolulu Biennial, Hawai’i State Art Museum, Hawai’i (2019)
- Océanie, Musée du Quai Branly, Paris, France (2019)
- The Slipping Away, Gus Fisher Gallery, Auckland (2019)
- Oceania, Royal Academy of Arts, London (2018)
- Signature Art Prize, Singapore Art Museum, Singapore (2018)
- The Dowse Art Museum, Wellington (2018)
- documenta 14, Kassel, Germany (2017)
- Making Space, Centre of Contemporary Art, Christchurch (2017)
- Noho 16 Whau, Art Centre, Auckland (2016)
- Disrupting the Narrative, Thistle Hall, Wellington (2015)
- International Artist Initiated, David Dale Gallery, Glasgow (2014)
- Kaokao, Toi Pōneke Arts Centre, Wellington (2014)
- We who live in darkness, New Zealand Academy of Fine Arts, Wellington (2014)
- Māori Art Market, TSB Arena, Wellington (2014)
- Pūwawao, Aratoi, Masterton (2013)
- Old Hall Gigs, Wellington (2013)
- Te Whare Pora, Enjoy Public Art Gallery, Wellington (2013)
