= Sarah Jane Parton =

New Zealand artist

Sarah Jane Parton (born 1980 in Lower Hutt, New Zealand) is a new media artist based in Wellington, New Zealand.

== Education ==
Parton studied Design and Fine Arts at Massey University's College of Creative Arts, graduating with a Bachelor of Fine Arts with Honours in Time-based Media in 2003. She taught at the college between 2004 and 2006, in 2008, and again in 2013. Between 2014 and 2019 she was a lecturer in Critical Studies in the college's School of Art where she also contributed to studio programmes. Parton completed the International Institute of Modern Letters Masters in Creative Writing at Victoria University of Wellington in 2012. In 2024, Parton graduated from Victoria University of Wellington with a degree in law. She was the 2021 recipient of the university’s Fran Wright Memorial Prize in Criminal Law.

== Career ==
Her single channel video work, she's so usual (2003), was included in Telecom Prospect 2004: New Art, New Zealand – an inaugural survey of contemporary art at Wellington's City Gallery. Since then she has featured in a number of group shows and has held six solo exhibitions, including Guidance at The Physics Room, Christchurch and The Way at The City Gallery Wellington, both in 2007.

Parton has also created cover art for her partner Luke Buda's solo albums, and had a piece of her writing published in the journal Turbine.

In 2016, a feminist collective of five artists which she belongs to, Fantasing, received a 2016 Audio Foundation Artists in Residence award. Also in 2016, Parton spent three months as an artist-in-residence at an arts centre in Malaysia on an Asia New Zealand Foundation grant.

Parton claims Cook Islands heritage and was a founding member of the New Zealand Cook Islands Arts Collective.

== Personal life ==
Parton lives in Wellington with her partner, musician Luke Buda (The Phoenix Foundation), and their two sons.

== Exhibitions ==
Solo Shows

- March – April 2009: Bright Light, Twinset, Christchurch Art Gallery, Christchurch.
- Sept – Oct 2008: Guidance, Seventh Gallery (Project Space), Melbourne, Australia.
- June – August 2008: Bright Light, The New Zealand Film Archive Media Gallery, Wellington.
- August – Nov 2007: The Way, City Gallery, Wellington.
- April – May 2007: Guidance, The Physics Room, Christchurch.
- May 2004: My sister's lashes, Enjoy Gallery, Wellington.

Collaborations and Performances

- July 2008: The End (live performance), The New Zealand Film Archive Cinema, Wellington.
- February 2008: Belonging (live performance), The New Zealand Film Archive Cinema, Wellington.
- April 2006: Macrofun, Show Gallery, Wellington.
- Dec 2004 – Jan 2005: Tired of dancing, Show Gallery, Wellington.
- Jan – Feb 2005: Postmark, Michael Hirschfeld Gallery, City Gallery, Wellington.

Group Shows/Screenings

- April – May 2009: New Work from New Zealand, Gallery Impaire, Paris, France.
- March 2009: Fountain Art Fair, temporary site in Hudson River Park, New York City.
- February 2009: The Japan Media Arts Festival, National Art Center, Tokyo, Japan.
- October 2008: Electro-projections 1, in Electrofringe – a Festival of Electronic Arts and Culture, Newcastle, Australia.
- August – Sept 2007: Territorial Pissings, The Engine Room, Massey University, Wellington.
- August – Nov 2007: Lost and Found Video Programme, Square2, City Gallery, Wellington.
- August 2007: Fronting Up, Enjoy Gallery, Wellington.
- March – April 2007: Artists' Film Festival, The New Zealand Film Archive, Wellington.
- May – June 2006: Painted Faces, Michael Hirschfeld Gallery, City Gallery, Wellington.
- March 2006: Fresh Faced, Bartley Nees Gallery, Wellington.
- July – Sept 2005: Canned Heat, Blue Oyster Galley, Dunedin.
- April – July 2005: First Dance; Dancehall Stories from the Turnbull Library Collection and Beyond, The National Library Gallery, Wellington.
- February 2005: Frugal Pleasures – a Survey of New Zealand Video Art, City Gallery, Wellington and The New Zealand Film Archive, Wellington.
- August – Sept 2004: Vanity Case, Michael Hirschfeld Gallery, City Gallery, Wellington.
- June – August 2004: Prospect 2004: New Art, New Zealand, City Gallery, Wellington.
