= Alex Monteith =

Irish–New Zealand artist (born 1977)

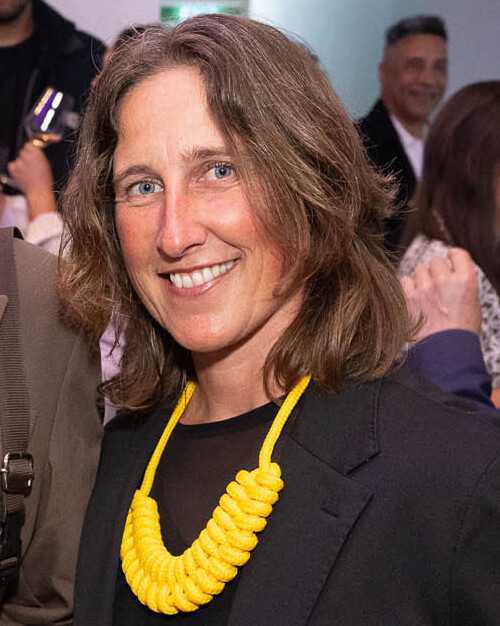
- Monteith in 2024
- Born: 1977 (age 48–49); Belfast, Northern Ireland

Academic background
- Education: University of Auckland
- Thesis: Chapter and verse: methods and applications of documentary theory and alternative practices for video/film in relation to the audiovisual archive precipitated by Northern Ireland's recent troubles (2004)

Academic work
- Discipline: New media artist
- Institutions: University of Auckland

Alex Monteith (born 1977) is a new media artist and academic, born in Northern Ireland and resident in New Zealand. She is also a competitive surfer and has won national titles in the sport.

== Biography ==
Monteith was born and grew up in Belfast, Northern Ireland. In the late 1980s she emigrated to New Zealand and settled in Auckland. She completed a bachelor's degree in photography in 2001, followed by a master's degree in intermedia and the time based arts and a doctorate in fine arts at the Elam School of Fine Arts, The University of Auckland. She later became a lecturer at the university.

Monteith's works focus on political issues surrounding land ownership, history and occupation. Many of her projects are located in large-scale geographies, such as the ocean. She has staged solo exhibitions at the Govett-Brewster Art Gallery and the Museum für Moderne Kunst in Frankfurt, Germany.

Monteith is also a member of the collective Local Time (composed of her, Danny Butt, Jon Bywater and Natalie Robertson). The collective has worked together since 2007 and has installed artworks in locations including Muri Lagoon, Rarotonga (2015), Māngere maunga (2014) and the Waitemata Harbour (2013) in Aotearoa New Zealand; Footscray, Australia (2014); and Delhi, India (2013).

=== Recognition ===
In 2004, Monteith received the Breton Award as overall festival winner at the International Surrealist Film Festival. In 2008, she received a New Generation Award from the Arts Foundation of New Zealand. In 2010, she was a finalist in the Walters Prize art competition.

=== Surfing career ===
Monteith was the Irish National Women’s champion in 2001 and represented Ireland in both the 2002 International Surfing Association World Surfing Championship in Durban, South Africa, and the European Surfing Championships in 2001.
