= Sriwhana Spong =

New Zealand artist and dancer (born 1979)

Sriwhana Spong (born 1979) is an artist and dancer from New Zealand.

Spong grew up in Auckland, New Zealand, in a family of Balinese origin. She studied at Elam School of Fine Arts, graduating with a Bachelor of Fine Arts in 2001. Her first exhibitions were in not-for-profit spaces in New Zealand, Australia and Germany. In 2003 she had her first solo show, at the Anna Miles Gallery.

Spong also holds a master's degree from Piet Zwart Institute in Rotterdam, the Netherlands. Much of her work is in film and video, and reflects her training in classical ballet by focusing on dance and movement. In 2010 she presented a multi-dimensional film at Art Basel, a re-imagining of a lost ballet, George Balanchine’s The Song of the Nightingale. The ballet was originally choreographed in 1925 however all that remains are fragments of a film of it, the score, and photographs of the costumes. Spong also published a companion book to her film. Spong obtained her doctorate from the University of Auckland. The title of her 2021 doctoral thesis was Scirinz (a running sore): particular and ecstatic scripts of the body by mystic women in the Middle Ages and early modern Europe.

== Women mystics ==
Spong's practice has been partly influenced by the works of medieval women mystics, which she first encountered while at Piet Zwart Institute in 2014. In an interview with Ocula in 2018, Spong mentioned the Brazilian writer Clarice Lispector, the Christian mystics Margery Kempe and Hildegard von Bingen, among others, as her inspirations. For Spong, who considers "art history' as largely the history of male looking—and predominantly white male looking", women mystics' writings led her to examine "the idea of breaking and entering the practice of a much-lauded male modernist painter and stealing a work, only to remake it into something of my own".

== Recognition ==
In 2005 Spong's work Nightfall won the Contemporary Art Award at Waikato Museum. In 2012 her work Fanta Silver and Song was shortlisted for the Walters Prize.
