= Peter Robinson (artist) =

New Zealand artist

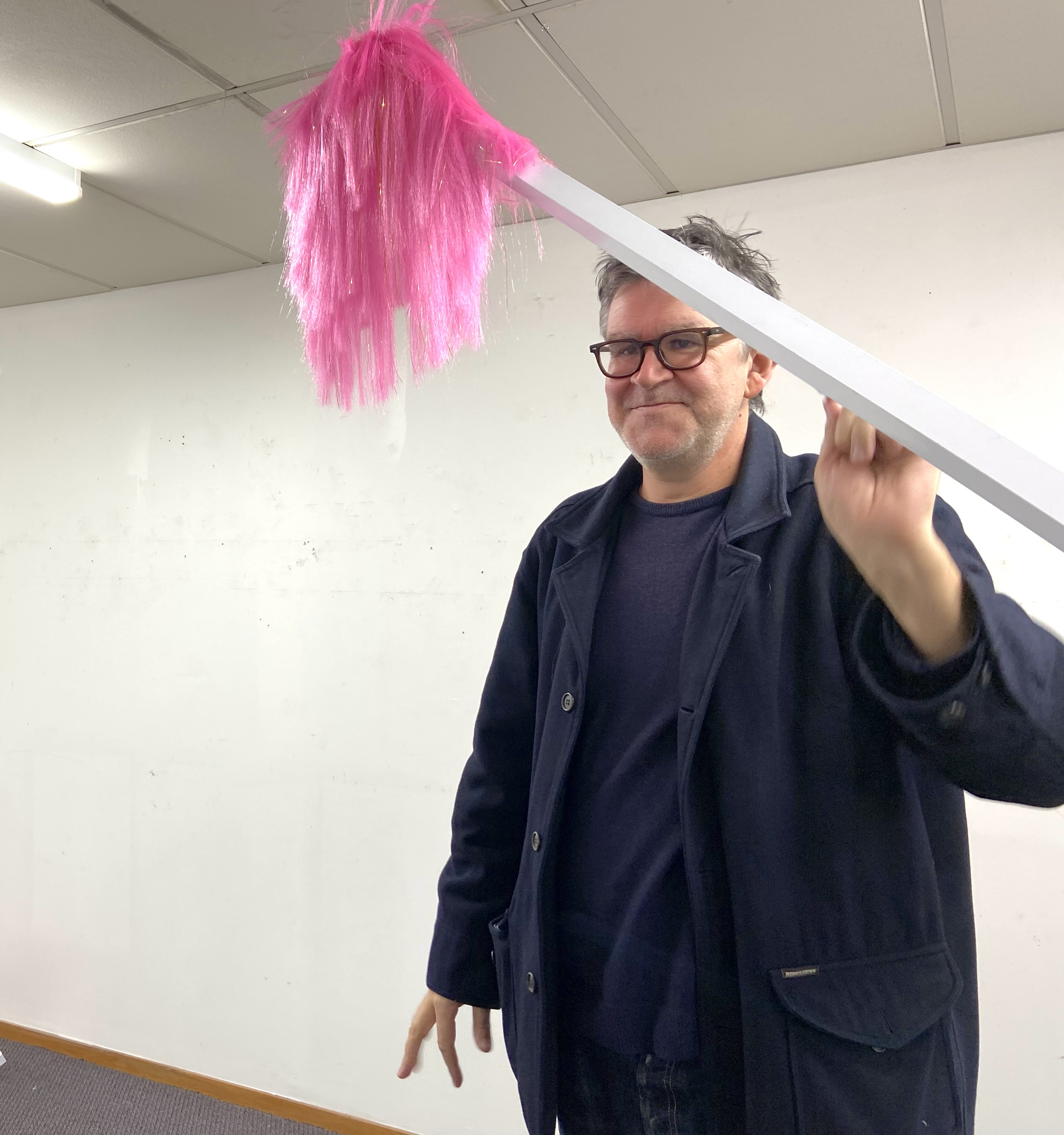
- Peter Robinson in his Auckland studio, 2020
- Born: 1966 (age 59–60); Ashburton
- Education: Ilam School of Fine Arts at the University of Canterbury
- Known for: Sculpture
- Style: Modernist

Peter Robinson (born 1966 in Ashburton) is a New Zealand artist of Māori (Kāi Tahu) descent. He is an associate professor at the Elam School of Fine Arts at the University of Auckland.

== Biography ==
Robinson studied sculpture at the Ilam School of Fine Arts at the University of Canterbury between 1985 and 1989.

== Exhibitions ==
Robinson quickly established an exhibiting career after graduating from art school, and was included in a number of international exhibitions including the Asia Pacific Triennial and the São Paulo Art Biennial (1996), the Biennale of Sydney (1998), the Lyon Biennale (2000), and the Baltic Triennale (2002).

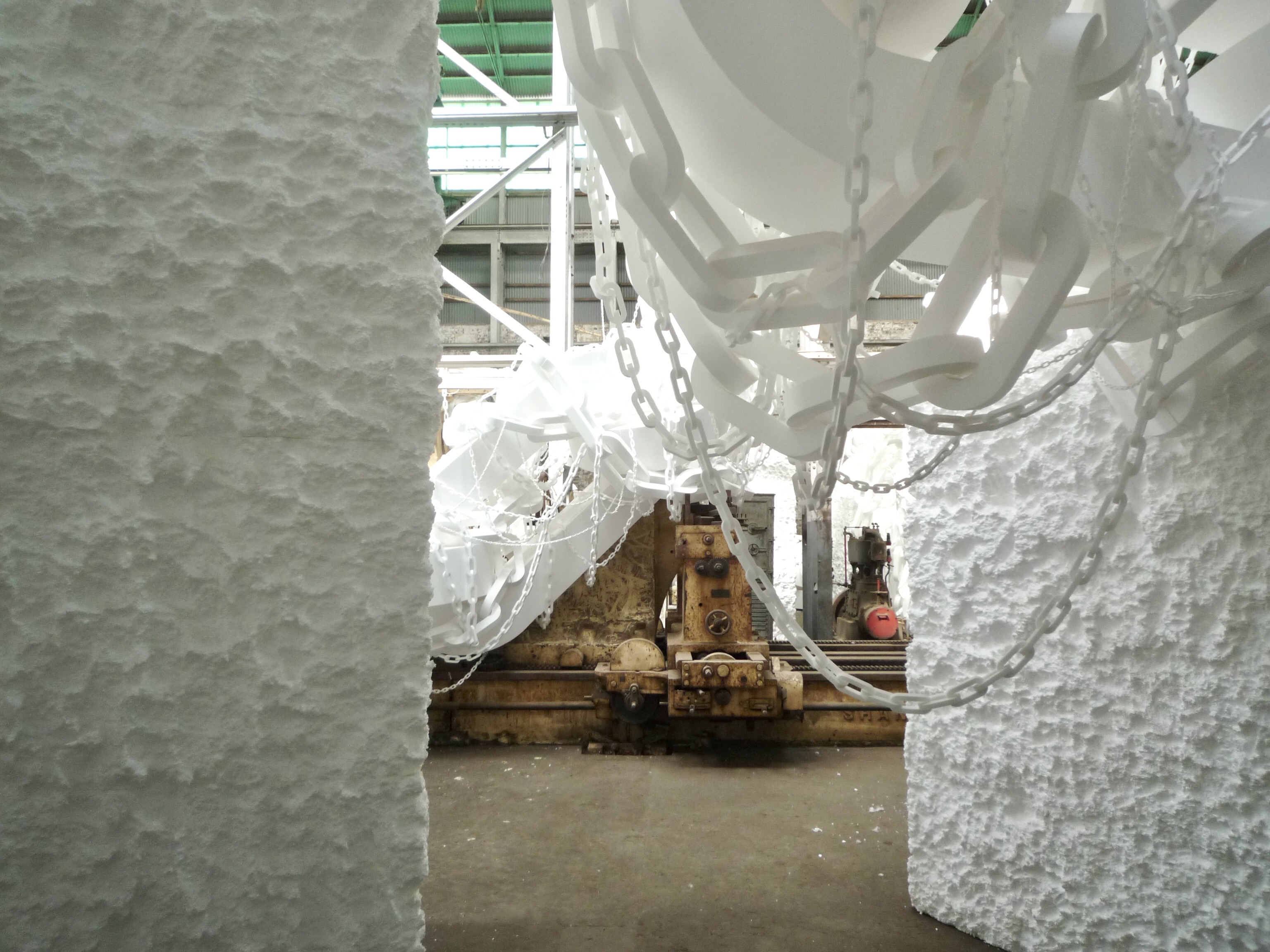
Peter Robinson Biennale of Sydney, 2012

In 2001 Robinson and Jacqueline Fraser were New Zealand's co-representatives at the Venice Biennale, the first time New Zealand participated with a national pavilion at the event. Robinson's biennale work, Divine Comedy, was originally developed while he was artist in residence at the Govett-Brewster Art Gallery in New Plymouth. In 2006 Robinson first exhibits his Walters Prize winning installation Ack at Auckland's Artspace. In 2012 Robinson was selected for the Biennale of Sydney, where he filled a massive warehouse space on Cockatoo Island with a huge installation titled Gravitas Lite, crafted from carved polystyrene.

Other exhibitions include:

- Charcoal Drawing (Ōtautahi), Christchurch Art Gallery Te Puna o Waiwhetū 2025
- Charcoal Drawing (Whangārei), Whangārei Art Museum 2024
- Kā Kaihōpara, Dunedin Public Art Gallery 2023
- Polymer Monoliths IMA, Brisbane 2011
- Tribe Subtribe, The Dowse Art Museum, 2013
- Peter Robinson: Cuts and Junctures, Adam Art Gallery, 2013
- If You Were to Work Here (The Mood in the Museum), The fifth Auckland Triennial, Auckland Art Gallery and Auckland War Memorial Museum
- Syntax, Artspace NZ, Auckland, 2015
- Syntax, Jakarta Biennale, 2015
- Toi Tū Toi Ora: Contemporary Māori Art, Auckland Art Gallery, Auckland, 2020
- 9th Asia Pacific Triennial of Contemporary Art, Gallery of Modern Art, Brisbane, Australia 2019

== Selected works ==
- Untitled (plane, car, blanket) 1994
- Boy Am I Scared Eh! 1997
- Inflation Theory 1 2001
- I Am I, I Am Not I 2001
- Promethean Dreams 2007
- Defunct Mnemonics 2012

== Awards ==
In 2008 Robinson was awarded the Walters Prize. In 2016 he was recognised with a Laureate award by the Arts Foundation of New Zealand.
