= Claudia Kogachi =

Japanese-born New Zealand artist (born 1995)

Claudia Kogachi (born 1995) is a Japanese-born New Zealand artist. She was born in Awaji-shima, Japan, in 1995.

In 2018 Kogachi graduated from the University of Auckland's Elam School of Fine Arts with a Bachelor of Fine Arts and in 2019 she won the New Zealand Painting and Printmaking Award.

Kogachi is an Auckland-based artist whose work renders domestic scenes, adolescence and inter-generational cultural learning through various mediums. Members of her immediate family feature frequently in her works, as well as an exploration of her Japanese-Okinawan heritage. Kogachi's 2020 work Obaachan during the lockdown, Wahiawā, Hawaiʻi was commissioned by Te Tuhi and developed with curator Abby Cunnane, and depicts a series of large tufted rugs depicting photographs Kogachi took while visiting her family in Hawai'i. Kogachi turned her art-making practice to rug tufting as a result of the COVID-19 pandemic's impact on her access to painting supplies.

Although born in Japan, Kogachi frequently visited her grandparents in Hawai'i who had moved there to work on the pineapple plantations. From the 1880s onwards, the pineapple industry brought many people from Japan seeking work, and many Japanese families settled permanently.

== Process ==
Speaking about making her tufted rugs, Kogachi has explained:

The guns themselves weigh roughly 3 kgs, which doesn’t sound like much, but when you’re spending roughly 60+ hours on each large rug the toll this can take on your body is intense. I remember after finishing the last series, my right arm was visibly larger and in more pain than my left. The guns have so much range and have allowed me to experiment with new materials and dimension, however it does restrict movement which can affect the overall work.

== Awards ==
- 2019 Winner NZPPA, New Zealand Painting and Printmaking Award
- 2017 Gordon Harris Painting Award

== Exhibitions ==
- Everyone Has a Horse Phase, Sanderson Contemporary, Auckland, 2020
- Free Snacks at the Airport Lounge, Allpress Studio, Auckland, 2019
- Those are my f-ing shoes, Sanderson Contemporary, Auckland, 2019
- Like A Boss (group exhibition), Franklin Arts Centre, 2018
- Mother and Daughter on Hiatus, Sanderson Contemporary, Auckland, 2018
- You're not a Princess you know, Window Gallery, Auckland, 2018
- Mom, are we friends? Meanwhile, Gallery, Wellington, 2018
- Uncle Gigi, play_station Gallery, Wellington, 2020
- New Artist Show 2020, Artspace Aotearoa, Auckland, 2020
- It is what it is, Jhana Millers, Wellington, 2021
- Rugged Heart, Visions Gallery, Auckland, 2021
- Hot Girls with IBS, Hot Lunch [project space], Christchurch, 2021
- When the Dust Settles, Artspace Aotearoa, Auckland, 2021
- Labour of Love, Phillida Reid, London, 2024
