= Bridget Reweti =

New Zealand photographer and artist

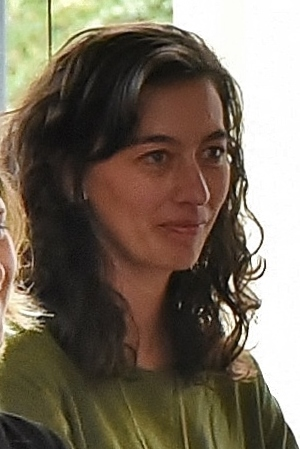
- Reweti at the Venice Biennale Youth Forum in 2017
- Occupation: Photographer
- Years active: 2000–present
- Known for: Landscapes and indigenous images

Bridget Reweti is a New Zealand photographer and moving image artist. Reweti is a member of the artist group Mataaho Collective.

== Education ==
Reweti holds a Master of Māori Visual Arts from Toioho ki Āpiti, the School of Māori Studies at Massey University. She also completed a Postgraduate Diploma in Museum and Heritage Studies from Victoria University of Wellington.

== Career ==
Reweti works with photography and moving image. Her work explores and subverts New Zealand iconic landscapes, and issues of contemporary indigenous realities. Reweti is a member of the Mata Aho Collective, a collaboration of four Māori women artists known for their large scale textile-based installations. She has held numerous residencies in New Zealand and internationally, and her work is held in both private and public collections. Reweti was the 2018 Artist in Residence at Samuel Marsden Collegiate School and was the 2020 Frances Hogkins Fellow.

As well as exhibiting her artwork nationally and internationally, Reweti has worked as at Ngā Taonga Sound & Vision, the Dowse Art Museum, and as the Exhibitions Officer at Pātaka Art + Museum. Rewati collaborates with Matariki Williams editing ATE Journal of Maori Art.

== Exhibitions ==
Reweti has exhibited throughout New Zealand and internationally. Her solo shows include I thought I would of climbed more mountains by now, at Enjoy Gallery in 2015 and Plymouth Arts Centre, U.K. in 2016, Tauutuutu at Pātaka Art + Museum in 2016, and Irihanga at Tauranga Art Gallery in 2017.

Her collaboration with Terri Te Tau, Ōtākaro, was presented at The Physics Room in 2016.

With the Mata Aho Collective, she exhibited Te Whare Pora at Enjoy Gallery as part of a 2013 summer Residency. In 2017, the Mata Aho Collective was included in Documenta 14, where they presented Kiko Moana, a large scale work rendered in blue tarpaulin mounted in Kassel's regional museum.

== Personal life ==
Reweti is of Ngāti Ranginui and Ngāi Te Rangi descent, and lives and works in Wellington.
