= Luke Willis Thompson =

New Zealand artist (born 1988)

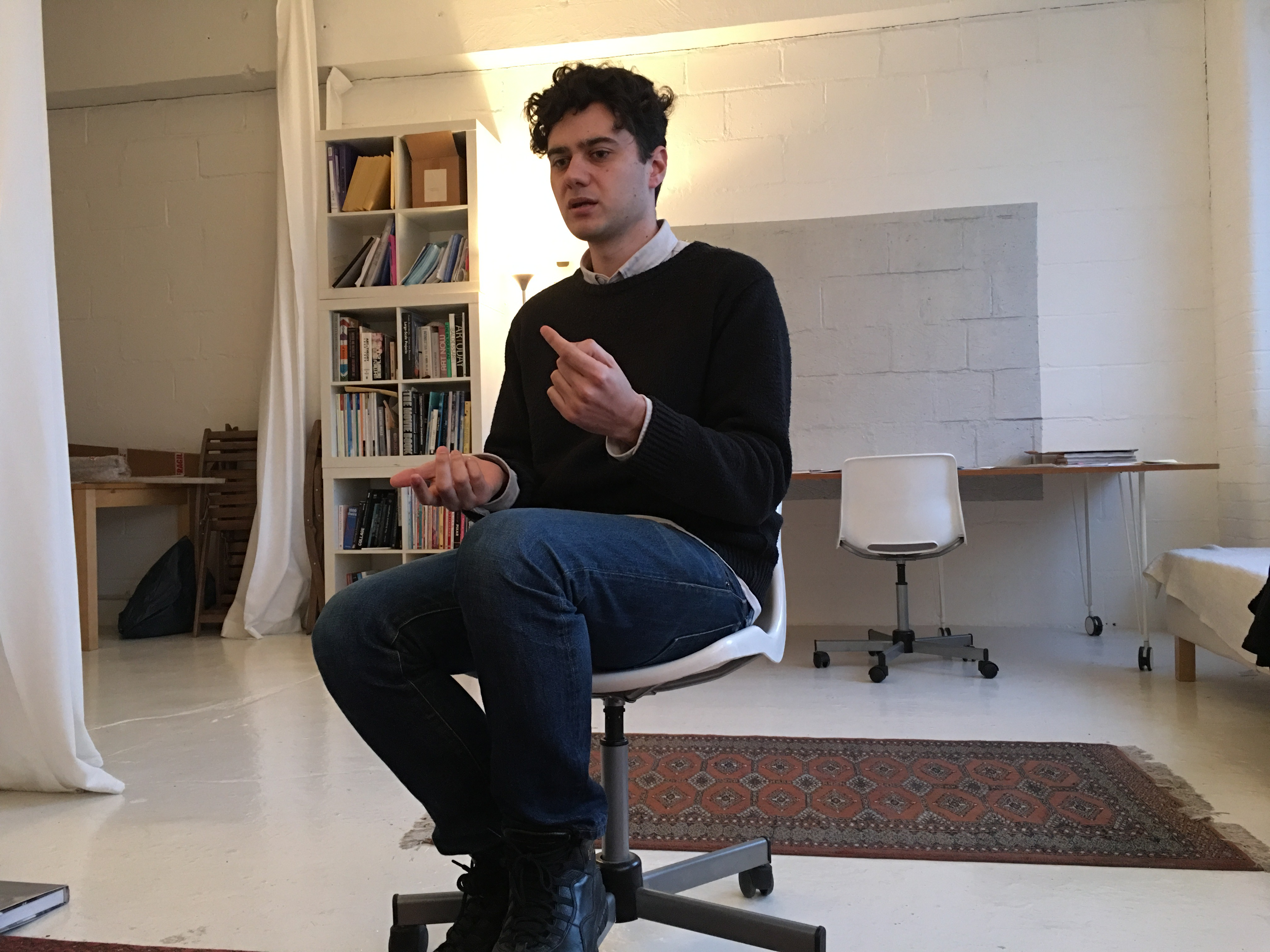
- Luke Willis Thompson in his London studio, 2017
- Born: 1988 (age 37–38); Auckland, New Zealand
- Education: Städelschule, University of Auckland

Luke Willis Thompson (born 1988) is a New Zealand artist of Fijian and European descent, currently working primarily in film. He lives in London.

== Education ==
Thompson was born in Auckland. He attended Auckland Grammar School, completed a BFA (2009) and MFA (2010) at the Elam School of Fine Arts, University of Auckland, and studied at the Städelschule, Staatliche Hochschule für Bildende Künste, Frankfurt am Main, in 2013–2014.

== Career ==
Since graduating from Elam School of Fine Art, Thompson has exhibited extensively in New Zealand and internationally. Solo exhibitions at public galleries include Luke Willis Thompson: Misadventure at the Institute of Modern Art, Brisbane (2016), Autoportrait at the Chisenhale Gallery and Luke Willis Thompson at the Adam Art Gallery (2018).

His work has been included in major art festivals and group exhibition, including the 2015 New Museum Triennial Surround Audience, the 8th Asia-Pacific Triennial at the Queensland Art Gallery (2016), La Biennale de Montréal 2016, and Field Guide, the inaugural exhibition at the Remai Modern.

== Awards and residencies ==
In 2014 Thompson was awarded the Walters Prize for his work inthisholeonthisislandwhereiam.

In 2016-2017 Thompson held the Chisenhale Gallery Create Residency at London's Chisenhale Gallery. During this time he developed two new silent film works: Cemetery of Uniforms and Liveries (2016) and Autoportrait (2017).

In 2018 Thompson was nominated for the Deutsche Börse Photography Foundation Prize, for Autoportrait. He was announced as the winner of the prize on 17 May 2018.

In April 2018 Thompson was announced as a finalist in the Tate's Turner Prize, also for Autoportrait. He is the second New Zealander to be nominated for the award, following photographer Boyd Webb in 1988.

== Significant works ==
=== Untitled (2012) ===
In 2012, a large-scale sculptural ready-made work by Thompson, Untitled (2012) was included in a group exhibition titled Between Memory and Trace at Te Tuhi Centre for the Arts in Pakuranga, Auckland. Shortly after, the work was shown at the Auckland Art Gallery as part of the 5th Auckland Triennial, and acquired for the gallery's permanent collection. The work consists of three roller doors once owned by Manurewa businessman Bruce Emery. On 26 January 2006 Emery saw 15 year-old Pihema Cameron and friend tagging the doors; Emery chased the two teenagers down and stabbed and killed Cameron with a fishing knife.

=== inthisholeonthisislandwhereiam (2012/2014) ===
Originally presented at Hopkinson Mossman in Auckland, inthisholeonthisislandwhereiam has no physical manifestation. Instead, participants were collected by taxi from the gallery, taken to a suburban home (later revealed to be the artist's own family home), where they were invited to move through the house but not enter the bedrooms, and then returned to the gallery. The work was restaged for the Walters Prize exhibition.

=== Sucu Mate/Born Dead (2016) ===
In January–February 2016 Thompson presented a sculptural ready-made work Sucu Mate/Born Dead (2016) at Hopkinson Mossman in Auckland. The work consists of nine headstones that were given on loan to Thompson for two years from the Balawa Estate cemetery in Lautoka, Fiji. When the work was shown later that year at the Institute of Modern Art in Brisbane, the gallery said:

This cemetery contains the graves of colonial migrant labourers from India, China, and elsewhere in Asia, who were indentured to sugarcane plantations. The cemetery is segregated along racial and social hierarchies. Colonisers’ graves occupy the upper part of the graveyard, which is set on a hill. Indigenous people are buried in the central section—including the artist’s own grandmother—while migrant labourers are interred at the bottom in an area which floods heavily. Thompson worked with the Fiji museum and the minister of culture in Fiji, to obtain permission to excavate the remains of damaged headstones and to repair their sites of excavation. Sucu Mate/Born Dead brings attention to the complicated historical interrelationships between cultures in the Pacific region, and highlights broader histories of exploitation central to colonisation.

Sucu Mate / Born Dead was also shown in the 8th Asia-Pacific Triennial at the Queensland Art Gallery in 2016.

=== Cemetery of Uniforms and Liveries (2016) ===
Cemetery of Uniforms and Liveries is a silent film shot on 16mm black and white film. Commissioned by the Institute of Modern Art, Brisbane, the work was completed when Thompson was artist in residence at Chisenhale Gallery. The film shows consecutive images of two young black men in portrait view (face and upper torso), wearing white dress shirts, filmed in front of a plain block-work wall. The films use the technology and aesthetics of Andy Warhol's Screen Tests, short films made using Kodak Tri-X 16mm film stock, of visitors to Warhol's studio The Factory between 1964 and 1966. Each visitor was invited to pose for the duration of a single 100 ft roll of film.

Thompson's subjects however are the descendants of women who died in London as the result of police brutality. 'Brandon' is the grandson of Dorothy ‘Cherry’ Groce, who was shot by Metropolitan Police in 1985 when they raided her home looking for her son Michael Groce. The shooting, which left Dorothy Groce paralysed, led to the 1985 Brixton riot. She died of complications from her injuries in 2011. 'Graeme' is the son of Joy Gardner, a 40-year-old Jamaican mature student living as an undocumented migrant in London who died after police raided her home intending to deport her in 1983. Gardner was bound and gagged by police and died four days later of cardiac arrest. None of the officers involved in these women's deaths were convicted.

=== Autoportrait (2017) ===
Autoportrait is a silent portrait of Diamond Reynolds (who filmed and live-streamed the moments after the fatal shooting of her partner Philando Castile by police in July 2016) shot on 35mm black and white film. The work was completed when Thompson was artist in residence at Chisenhale Gallery, where the film debuted.

Thompson describes the work as a 'sister-image' to Reynolds' own video, which has been viewed millions of times around the world. In an interview with Thompson for The Guardian about the work, Hettie Judah wrote:

“Diamond,” says the artist, “needed to be interpolated into cinematic history – the history of cinema owes black life something.” Autoportrait is intended as a counter to the cameraphone footage Reynolds broadcast on Facebook – which was, and continues to be, widely shared. “She is recognised,” Thompson reminds me, “for the worst day of her life.” He wanted to provide her with an alternative.

=== How Long? (2017) ===
In February 2018 Thompson opened his first public gallery solo exhibition in New Zealand, at the Adam Art Gallery. The exhibition, titled Luke Willis Thompson, features three film works: Cemetery of Uniforms and Liveries, Autoportrait and a new commission How Long? (2017), filmed in Fiji in December 2017.
