= Kalisolaite 'Uhila =

Tongan-born New Zealand performance artist

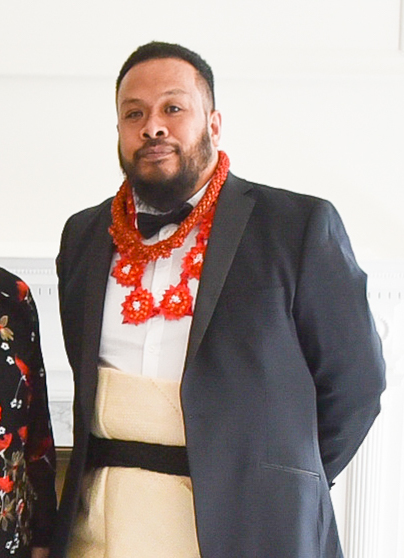
- Born: 1981 (age 44–45); Tonga
- Education: Auckland University of Technology
- Notable work: Mo’ui tukuhausia (2014), Ongo Mei Moana (2015), Mother Man (2022), Kelekele Mo‘ui (Living Soil) (2024)
- Style: Performance art
- Awards: Harriet Friedlander Residency (2021)
- Website: https://michaellett.com/artist/kalisolaite-uhila/

Kalisolaite ‘Uhila is a Tongan-born New Zealand award-winning performance artist.

== Biography ==
Kalisolaite ‘Uhila was born in Tonga in 1981, and is based in Auckland. 'Uhila began as a print maker, completing his Bachelor of Visual Arts in 2010. He then moved into being a performance artist and completed a Master of Performance and Media Arts in 2016, for which his thesis was entitled: Maumau-taimi: Wasting Time; Being Useless.

'Uhila's performances have been wide ranging, including "living in a shipping container with a pig for a week,... performing on the roof of a gallery to bemused spectators in adjacent high-rise buildings and the street below, and 'cooking' himself in an umu."

His most famous work, Mo'ui tukuhausia, involved him sleeping rough at Te Tuhi Gallery (2012) and the Auckland Art Gallery (2014), for which he was a finalist for the Walters Prize in 2014.

In 2015, Ongo Mei Moana saw 'Uhila spend six-hours a day conducting the tide of Oriental Bay, Wellington. In 2019, he performed at the Second Honolulu Biennial.

In 2020, 'Uhila was featured in Robert George's movie I Am the Moment, which competed in the New Zealand International Film Festival. The film featured 'Uhila's work in Tokyo while in residency at Youkobo Art Space in 2018.

In 2022, he performed Mother Man with his nephew, at the Auckland Art Gallery, which reinterpreted "Tongan gender roles enacted in ritual and ceremonial events which govern interactions." From 2023-2024, he also worked in New York City and Hastings. In 2024, 'Uhila performed Kelekele Mo‘ui (Living Soil) at the Hastings Art Gallery.

== Awards and residencies ==
He has been the recipient of a number of awards and residencies including:

- Finalist for Walters Prize, 2014, for Mo'ui tukuhausia
- ZK/U & Ifa Galerie Residency, Berlin, 2016
- Contemporary Pacific Art Award, Arts Pasifika Awards, 2017
- Montalvo Arts Centre Residency, California
- Youkobo Art Space Residency, Tokyo, 2018
- Dunedin Public Art Gallery’s Aotearoa New Zealand Visiting Artist, 2019
- Harriet Friedlander Residency, Arts Foundation of New Zealand, 2021
