= Steve Carr (artist) =

New Zealand artist (born 1976)

- Born: 1976 (age 49–50); Gore, New Zealand
- Education: Elam School of Fine Arts

Steve Carr (born 1976) is a New Zealand artist based in Auckland, and founder of the Blue Oyster Art Project Space in Dunedin. He works predominantly with film, sculpture and photography, using aspects of everyday life—a suburban game of Cowboys and Indians, images of spring blossoms against blue skies, used baseball gloves—as the source material for his art practice.

Carr studied at the Elam School of Fine Arts, University of Auckland, under the tuition of Michael Parekowhai. He first came to prominence with the video work Air Guitar (2001), a silent moving-image work in which the artist enacts a stadium-rock show performance of Joe Satriani's guitar handiwork, replete with stage-lighting and theatrical fog. According to Anthony Byrt, "His work is usually seen as charming and cheeky, underpinned by a boyish taste for exhibitionism."

Exhibitions featuring the artist's work include:

- "Burster Flipper Wobbler Dripper Spinner Stacker Shaker Maker," Christchurch Art Gallery Te Puna w Waiwhetu, 2014.
- "Steve Carr, Stretching Time," Dunedin Public Art Gallery, 2014.
- "Great Southern Lands: Australian and New Zealand Art in Opposition and Parallel," Sydney Art Month Contemporary Art Festival, Carriageworks, 2014.
- "Freedom Farmers: New Zealand Artists Growing Ideas," Auckland Art Gallery Toi o Tāmaki, 2013.

Works by Carr are held in several public collections throughout Australia and New Zealand including the Auckland Art Gallery Toi o Tāmaki, Christchurch Art Gallery Te Puna o Waiwhetu, Dunedin Public Art Gallery, Museum of New Zealand Te Papa Tongarewa, and National Gallery of Victoria.
