= Walters Prize =

New Zealand biennial contemporary art prize

The Walters Prize is New Zealand's largest contemporary art prize.

Held biennially since 2002, the prize aims to 'make contemporary art a more widely recognised and debated feature of cultural life'. The prize is named in honour of New Zealand abstract painter Gordon Walters and the founding benefactors and principal donors are Erika and Robin Congreve and Dame Jenny Gibbs. The prize is organised by and held at Auckland Art Gallery.

Four artists are nominated each year by a panel of four New Zealand-based jurors for a work or body of work exhibited in the previous two years. The four artists are invited to install the nominated works (or version of their nominated show) at the Auckland Art Gallery in a public exhibition. The prize is awarded by a visiting international judge.

The winner receives $50,000.

== Recipients and finalists ==
2024

Judge: Bonaventure Soh Bejeng Ndikung

Jurors: Robert Leonard, Tendai Mutambu, Melanie Oliver and Hanahiva Rose

Winner: Ana Iti A resilient heart like the mānawa

Finalists:

- Juliet Carpenter EGOLANE
- Owen Connors your cart and plow over the bones of the dead and Incubations
- Brett Graham Tai Moana Tai Tangata
- Ana Iti The woman whose back was a whetstone, Roharoha and I must shroud myself in stinging nettle

2021

Judge: Kate Fowle

Jurors: Allan Smith, Nathan Pohio, Melanie Oliver, Charlotte Huddleston.

Finalists:

- Mata Aho Collective and Maureen Lander for Atapō (winner)
- Fiona Amundsen for A Body That Lives
- Sriwhana Spong for The painter-tailor
- Sonya Lacey for Weekend

There was some controversy over conflict of interest with this iteration of the Walters Prize, as two of the selected works had been in exhibitions curated by jurors.

2018

Judge: Adriano Pedrosa

Jurors: Stephen Cleland, Allan Smith, Lara Strongman, Megan Tamati-Quennell

Finalists:

- Ruth Buchanan for Bad Visual Systems (winner)
- Jacqueline Fraser for The Making of Mississippi Grind 2017
- Jess Johnson & Simon Ward for Whol Why Wurld
- Pati Solomona Tyrell for Fāgogo

2016

Judge: Doryun Chong

Jurors: Emma Bugden, Peter Robinson, Lara Strongman, Nina Tonga

Finalists:

- Shannon Te Ao for Two shoots that stretch far out (2013–2014) (winner)
- Joyce Campbell for Flightdream (2015)
- Nathan Pohio for Raise the anchor, unfurl the sails, set course to the centre of an ever setting sun! (2015)
- Lisa Reihana for in Pursuit of Venus [infected] (2015)

2014

Judge: Charles Esche

Jurors: Tina Barton, Anna-Marie White, Peter Robinson, Caterina Riva.

Finalists:

- Luke Willis Thompson for inthisholeonthisislandwhereiam (winner)
- Maddie Leach for If you find the good oil let us know
- Simon Denny for All You Need is Data
- Kalisolaite 'Uhila for Mo'ui tukuhausia

2012

Judge: Mami Kataoka

Jurors: David Cross, Aaron Kreisler, Kate Montgomery, Gwynneth Porter.

- Kate Newby for Crawl out your window (winner)
- Simon Denny for Introductory logic video tutorial
- Alicia Frankovich for Floor Resistance
- Sriwhana Spong for Fanta Silver and Song

2010

Judge: Vicente Todolí

Jurors: Jon Bywater, Rhana Devenport, Leonhard Emmerling and Kate Montgomery.

- Dan Arps for Explaining Things (winner)
- Alex Monteith for Passing Manoeuvre with Two Motorcycles and 584 Vehicles for Two-Channel Video
- Fiona Connor for Something Transparent (please go round the back)
- Saskia Leek for Yellow is the Putty of the World

German-based New Zealand artist Michael Stevenson was also nominated for his 2008 exhibition Persepolis 2530 shown in Bristol, but the Auckland Art Gallery stated that 'due to accommodation and budgetary constraints it was not possible to exhibit' the work and therefore while the nomination stood it was not eligible for judging.

2008

Judge: Catherine David

Jurors: Jon Bywater, Elizabeth Caldwell, Andrew Clifford and Rhana Devenport

- Peter Robinson for ACK (winner)
- Edith Amituanai for Déjeuner
- Lisa Reihana for Digital Marae
- John Reynolds for Cloud

2006

Judge: Carolyn Christov-Bakargiev

Jurors: Tina Barton, Andrew Clifford, Wystan Curnow and Heather Galbraith

- Francis Upritchard for Doomed, Doomed, All Doomed (winner)
- Stella Brennan for Wet Social Sculpture
- Phil Dadson for Polar Projects
- Peter Robinson for The Humours

2004

Judge: Robert Storr

Jurors: Tina Barton, Dr Deidre Brown, Greg Burke and Justin Paton

- et al. for restricted access (winner)
- Jacqueline Fraser for <<Invisible>>
- Ronnie van Hout for No Exit Parts 1 and 2
- Daniel von Sturmer for The Truth Effect

2002

Judge: Harald Szeemann

Jurors: Robert Leonard, Justin Paton, Anna Miles and William McAloon

- Yvonne Todd for Asthma and Eczema (winner)
- Gavin Hipkins for The Homely (1997-2000)
- John Reynolds for Harry Human Heights (2001)
- Michael Stevenson for Call Me Immendorff (2000)
