= Edith Amituanai =

New Zealand Pasifika photographer

Edith Amituanai MNZM
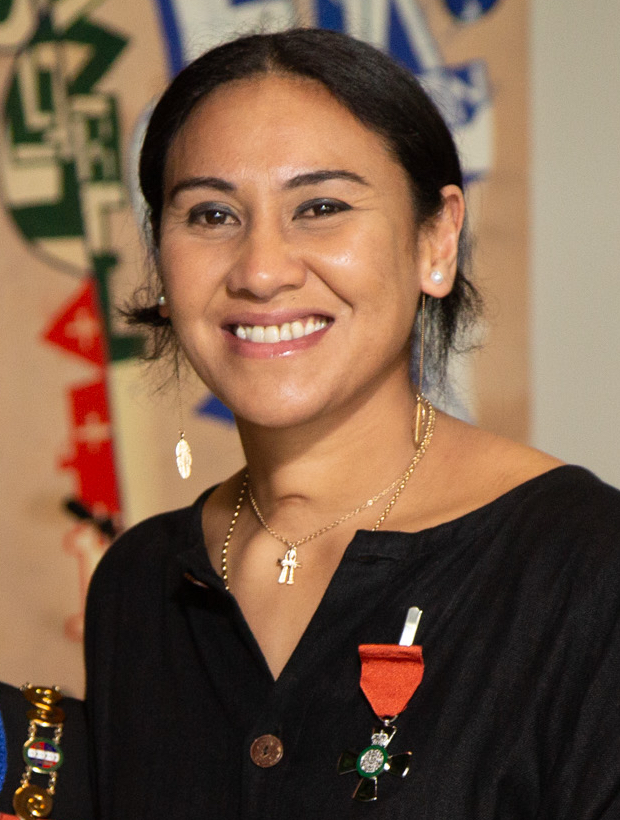
- Amituanai in 2019
- Born: 1980 (age 45–46); Auckland, New Zealand
- Education: Unitec; Elam School of Fine Arts, University of Auckland
- Known for: photography
- Website: www.edithamituanai.com

Edith Amituanai MNZM (born 1980) is a New Zealand photographic artist. In 2007, she was the inaugural recipient of the Marti Friedlander Photographic Award. Examples of her work are held in the collections of Te Papa, Auckland Art Gallery, and the Govett-Brewster Art Gallery.

== Biography ==
Amituanai was born in Auckland in 1980 to parents who had emigrated from Samoa. She was raised in Christchurch and now is located in Ranui, West Auckland.

In 2005, Amituanai completed a Bachelor of Design at Unitec Institute of Technology. Amituanai's photography first came to the attention of the art world while she attended Unitec, when her work was included in the Break/Shift exhibition (2004) at the Govett-Brewster Art Gallery. Her work was later included in the Lara Strongman book Contemporary New Zealand Photographers (2006), documenting her work as an emerging artist. In 2009 she completed her Masters of Fine Arts from Elam School of Fine Arts at the University of Auckland. In 2008 she was the first Pasifika artist to be nominated for the Walters Prize for Déjeuner, an exhibition depicting her cousin after a rugby practice session in France.

In 2015, Amituanai founded ETA (Edith's Talent Agency), an art project documenting the communities near her local suburb of Ranui. She is also the arts co-ordinator at Ranui Action Project, a local community development programme.

2019 was the first survey exhibition of her work at the Adam Art Gallery in Wellington curated by Ane Tonga and included over 60 of her photographs. Amituanai received the KLM Paul Huf Award, Amsterdam, and in 2019 Amituanai was appointed a Member of the New Zealand Order of Merit in the 2019 Queen's Birthday Honours, for services to photography and community.

Her video work Vaimoe (2024), first shown in Toloa Tales at Christchurch Art Gallery, was shortlisted for the 2027 Walters Prize.

Her artwork is held in the collections of Te Papa (the national museum of New Zealand), Govett-Brewster Art Gallery and the Auckland Art Gallery Toi o Tāmaki.

== Artistry ==
Amituanai's photography focuses on diaspora experiences in New Zealand, family communities, urban environments and amplifying unseen and unheard people. Many of her works depict Pasifika in Aotearoa, and transnational domestic interiors of Samoan diaspora houses. Amituanai is inspired by documentary photography, and has a commitment to community engagement with her subjects. Amituanai's documentation of diaspora communities in West Auckland have been described as challenging the dominant myth that West Auckland is primarily a European area. Her work features aspects of both straight documentary photography and staged photography.

Her works variously confront her parents' cultural values in a new context, celebrate her parents' generation's Samoan traditions such as marriage in a New Zealand context, and document the ways in which Pasifika communities establish new lives while maintaining connections to their homeland.

== Personal life ==
Amituanai got married in 2005. At the time, she was the first "Mrs Amituanai" in her husband's household for 14 years, after the untimely death of his mother.

== Residencies ==
- 2014 – Taipei Artist Village resident.
- 2017 – Flaxmere's Kimi Ora Community School.

== Books ==
Double Take (2019) - ISBN 978-1-877309-43-4.

Keep on Kimi Ora (2018) – ISBN 9780473437619, 0473437619 – collaboration with Kimi Ora Primary School in Flaxmere.

== Exhibitions ==
- 2006 – Mrs Amituanai. RAMP Gallery, Waikato Institute of Technology, City Campus (Hamilton.)
- 2013 – Through the Key Hole. Collaboration with Claire Harris and Erwin Olaf. Enjoy Contemporary Art Space, Wellington.
- 2013–2014 – La fine del mondo, Auckland Art Gallery. Auckland. (Part of Freedom Farmers: New Zealand.)
- 2019 – Double Take. Survey exhibition. Adam Art Gallery, Wellington, Curated by Ane Tonga.
- 2020–2021– In Our Sea of Island's. Collaboration with George Crummer. The Homestead Galleries, Auckland.
- 2021 – The Moon Was Talking, Collaboration with Kelston Girls College, Te Uru Waitākere Contemporary Gallery. Auckland.
- 2021 – ‘La’u Pele Moana (My darling Moana)’ series. QAGOMA's landmark exhibition series.The Gallery of Modern Art (Queensland Art Gallery).
- 2024 – Edith Amituanai and Sione Tuívailala Monū: Toloa Tales. Christchurch Art Gallery Te Puna Waiwhetū.

=== Group exhibitions ===
- 2004 – Break/Shift, the Govett-Brewster Art Gallery, New Plymouth
- 2013 – Pictures They Want to Make: Recent Auckland Photography Northart, Auckland, 20 May – 12 June 2013.
- 2021 – Time Drag Anna Miles Gallery, Auckland. 30 May – 3 July 2021.
- 2026-2027 – Slow Burn: Women and Photography | Ahi Tāmau: Māreikura Whakaahua. Museum of New Zealand Te Papa Tongarewa, Wellington.

== Awards ==
- 2007 – Marti Friedlander Photographic Award
- 2008 – Walters Prize finalist (first finalist of Pacific descent)
- 2026 – Walters Prize finalist
- 2027 – Walters Prize finalist, for Vaimoe.
