= Jacqueline Fraser =

New Zealand artist

- Born: Jacqueline Fraser; 14 March 1956; Dunedin, New Zealand
- Education: Elam School of Fine Arts, 1974 to 1977.
- Known for: Arts

Jacqueline Fraser (born 14 March 1956) is a New Zealand artist of Ngāi Tahu descent.

== Early life ==
Fraser was born in 1956 in Dunedin, New Zealand. She studied at the Elam School of Fine Arts in Auckland from 1974 to 1977.

== Work and career ==
Fraser's early work involved installations, inside gallery spaces and in outdoor environments, where she used natural and artificial materials which were woven, plaited, stretched and tied into delicate constructions. Art historian Anne Kirker compared her work from the 1970s and 1980s to 'three-dimensional drawings in space'.

From early in her career Fraser was included in significant exhibitions, including the Mildura Sculpture Triennial (Mildura, Australia, 1978); the 1979 Biennale of Sydney; ANZART, the first Australia-New Zealand artist exchange developed by artist and curator Ian Hunter in (Christchurch, 1981); Perspecta 1986 (Art Gallery of New South Wales); NZXI (Auckland City Art Gallery; Art Gallery of New South Wales, Sydney; and Contemporary Art Institute, Brisbane, 1988) Fraser was also one of seven artists in the 'ground-breaking' 1990 exhibition Choice! curated by George Hubbard for Artspace in Auckland.

In 1992 Fraser lived and worked in Avize, France, as the Moët et Chandon Fellow. Having previously worked more spontaneously with space inside galleries, Fraser found that this was not possible in French galleries, which had stricter requirements and required plans to be submitted beforehand. On her return she made the site-specific work He Tohu: The New Zealand Room for the opening of City Gallery Wellington in its Civic Square location. In 1997 Fraser created the major installation Te Ara a Hine for the opening of the Museum of New Zealand Te Papa Tongarewa.

In 2001 Fraser, along with Peter Robinson, represented New Zealand in its first participation at the Venice Biennale. Fraser's installation work, A Demure Portrait of the Artist Strip Searched with 11 Details of Bi-Polar Disorder, is now in the collection of the Museum of New Zealand Te Papa Tongarewa.

Fraser's work of the 1980s and 1990s was often discussed in contemporary art criticism and theory in terms of identity and cultural politics, and for links to her Māori heritage. From 2000 she has purposefully recast her career and work in an international framework, living and working in Paris and New York.

Fraser's work, such as The Making of the Pope of Greenwich Village 2012 (City Gallery Wellington, 2011), The Making of American Gangster 2012 (Michael Lett Gallery, Auckland, 2012) And The Making of the Ciao Manhattan Tapes 2013 (Adam Art Gallery, 2013), include collages in which clippings from magazines are mixed with other materials, such as gold foil, plastic, and wood veneer. These collages are sometimes incorporated into multimedia installations in the gallery spaces, mixed with theatrical lighting, video projections, designer furniture, and cut-out figures, accompanied by soundtracks made from contemporary rap music, including Nicki Minaj and A$AP Rocky. Examples of these works were paired with photographs from Australian artist Tracey Moffat's Up in the sky series in the 2016 exhibition Filmic imaginaries: Jacqueline Fraser and Tracey Moffatt at the Museum of New Zealand Te Papa Tongarewa.

== Collections ==
Fraser's work is held in private and public collections including Auckland Art Gallery, the Govett-Brewster Art Gallery, the Sarjeant Gallery, the Museum of New Zealand Te Papa Tongarewa, Christchurch Art Gallery, Dunedin Public Art Gallery, Queensland Art Gallery and the National Gallery of Australia.

== Influences ==
Major influences on Fraser's art include her love of Renaissance art, as well as her Māori and Scottish heritage.

== Further information ==
- Francis Pound, Exhibitions: Dunedin, Art New Zealand, no. 12, Winter 1979. Retrieved 2 January 2015
- Neil Rowe, Twenty One Sculptors in Masterton, Art New Zealand, no. 16 Winter 1980. Retrieved 2 January 2015
- Barbara Strathdee, Women Artists At The F1 New Zealand Sculpture Project, Art New Zealand, no. 26, Autumn 1983. Retrieved 26 June 2015
- Megan Dunn, Prospect Upstairs, Eye Contact, 19 December 2011. Retrieved 2 January 2015
- Peter Ireland, Dark, Eye Contact, 11 June 2013. Retrieved 2 January 2015
- Robert Leonard, Unnerved: The New Zealand Project, Eyeline, no. 73, 2011. Retrieved 26 June 2015
- Jacqueline Fraser in the collection of the Museum of New Zealand Te Papa Tongarewa
