= The Physics Room =

Art gallery in Christchurch, New Zealand

Coordinates: 43°31′52.9″S 172°37′49.42″E

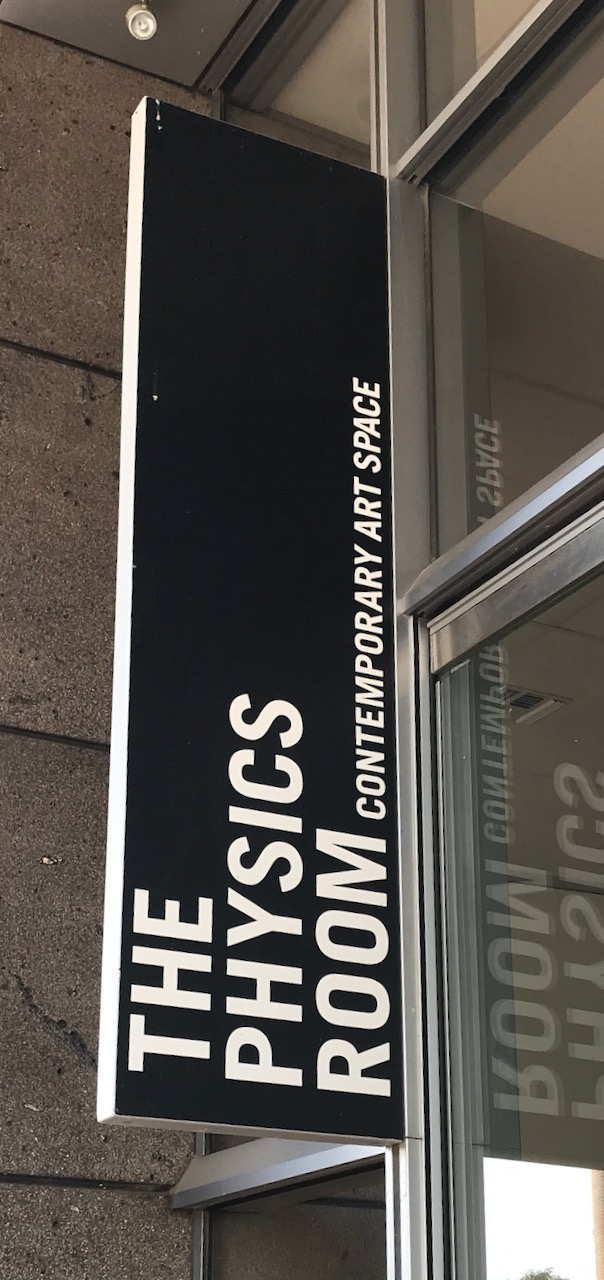
Sign on Worcester Boulevard

The Physics Room is a non-commercial contemporary art gallery in Christchurch, New Zealand, described as "one of the country's best-known contemporary experiential art spaces". It is primarily funded by Creative New Zealand, one of four contemporary art spaces thus funded since the mid-1990s (the others are the Blue Oyster Art Project Space, Artspace NZ, and Enjoy). The Gallery is overseen by a charitable trust governed by a board of trustees.

The Physics Room began in 1992 as the South Island Art Projects, based at the Christchurch Arts Centre, which organised exhibitions in other galleries, published a newsletter, and hosted visiting artists and speakers. In 1996 the Physics Room Trust was formed, and opened a gallery and office in the former Canterbury College Physics Room building. Since opening, it has facilitated exhibitions, publications, offsite projects and residencies that promote contemporary art and critical discourse.

In 1999 it moved from the Arts Centre into a larger gallery space in the Old Post Office Building on 209 Tuam Street. The Christchurch earthquakes forced a temporary relocation to Sandyford Street in Sydenham under recently appointed director Stephen Cleland. In 2013 the gallery returned to 209 Tuam Street with new director Melanie Oliver, formerly of Enjoy and the Govett-Brewster Gallery. Oliver left in 2016 to become Senior Curator at the Dowse, and was succeeded by Jamie Hanton, former director of the Blue Oyster in Dunedin, who was director between 2016 and 2021. In January 2018 the gallery relocated temporarily to 49–59 Worcester Boulevard. Abby Cunnane was director between 2021 and 2024.

In January 2020 the gallery relocated permanently to the Registry Additions building in the Christchurch Arts Centre. The current director is James Tapsell-Kururangi.
