= Ana Iti =

New Zealand contemporary artist (born 1989)

Ana Iti (born 1989) is a New Zealand contemporary artist.

== Biography ==
Iti was born in 1989 and is of Te Rarawa, Ngāi Tūpoto, Ngāti Here, and Pākehā descent. Her fine arts education includes a Bachelor of Fine Arts in sculpture from Ilam School of Fine Arts (completed by 2012), and a Master of Fine Arts from Massey University in Wellington (completed by 2018). She grew up in Blenheim.

== Career ==
Iti works with artistic mediums of sculpture, video and text. With her work Iti investigates connections across language as a practice, learning experience and concept, and environments (often connected to her personally). Her practice involves "shared and personal history-making."

== Residencies and publications ==
- McCahon House resident – July–September 2020
- Summer resident in Blue Oyster space – 9–29 January 2016
- Languages of Design – panel discussion with Matthew Galloway, 11 May 2024, Te Herenga Waka Victoria University of Wellington

== Exhibitions ==
- He wāhi pāoro, 10 May – 7 June 2025, combines her videos I am a salt lake (2024) and A dry and windswept body (2025), Stepdown, Hastings.
- Whakaruruhau, 2024, aluminium and shade cloth – site specific sculptural installation exploring the relationship between the kahukura, ongaonga, and surrounding environment.
- A resilient heart like the mānawa, 2024, Auckland Art Gallery Toi o Tāmaki
- I must shroud myself in a stinging nettle, 17 December 2022 – 23 April 2023, dual-channel HD video in colour with sound, steel and gardener's frost cloth sculpture, and accompanying text, City Gallery Wellington Te Whare Toi – includes Roharoha (commissioned and initially exhibited by Gus Fisher Gallery in Turning a page, starting a chapter (30 April – 9 July 2022)) and Shelters.
- I am a salt lake, 9 September – 22 October 2023, research images and video, The Physics Room – includes footage of Kāpara-Te-Hau (salt lakes in Te Tau Ihu), various abstract diagrams on glass, and text in the first person.
- How should we talk to one another?, 27 February – 23 May 2021, digital display and text, Te Uru Gallery – delves into writing of Māori woman authors and learning language.
  - Essay on A dusty handrail on the track, 2021.
- The Old and the New, 2017, text on front of Nursery building at Christchurch Botanic Gardens, in collaboration with Gemma Banks.
- Heavy to Hold, 2–27 February 2016, sculpture and video, Blue Oyster Art Project Space Te Tio Kikorangi, Dunedin.

== Awards ==
Iti won the Walters Prize 2024 with her sculptural and sound installation A resilient heart like the mānawa. She won the Grace Butler Memorial Foundation Award at Ara in 2022.
