= Ruth Buchanan =

New Zealand artist

Ruth Buchanan (born 1980) is a contemporary New Zealand artist of Te Āti Awa, Taranaki, and European decent. Buchanan was born in New Plymouth and grew up in Wellington. She lives and works in Auckland.

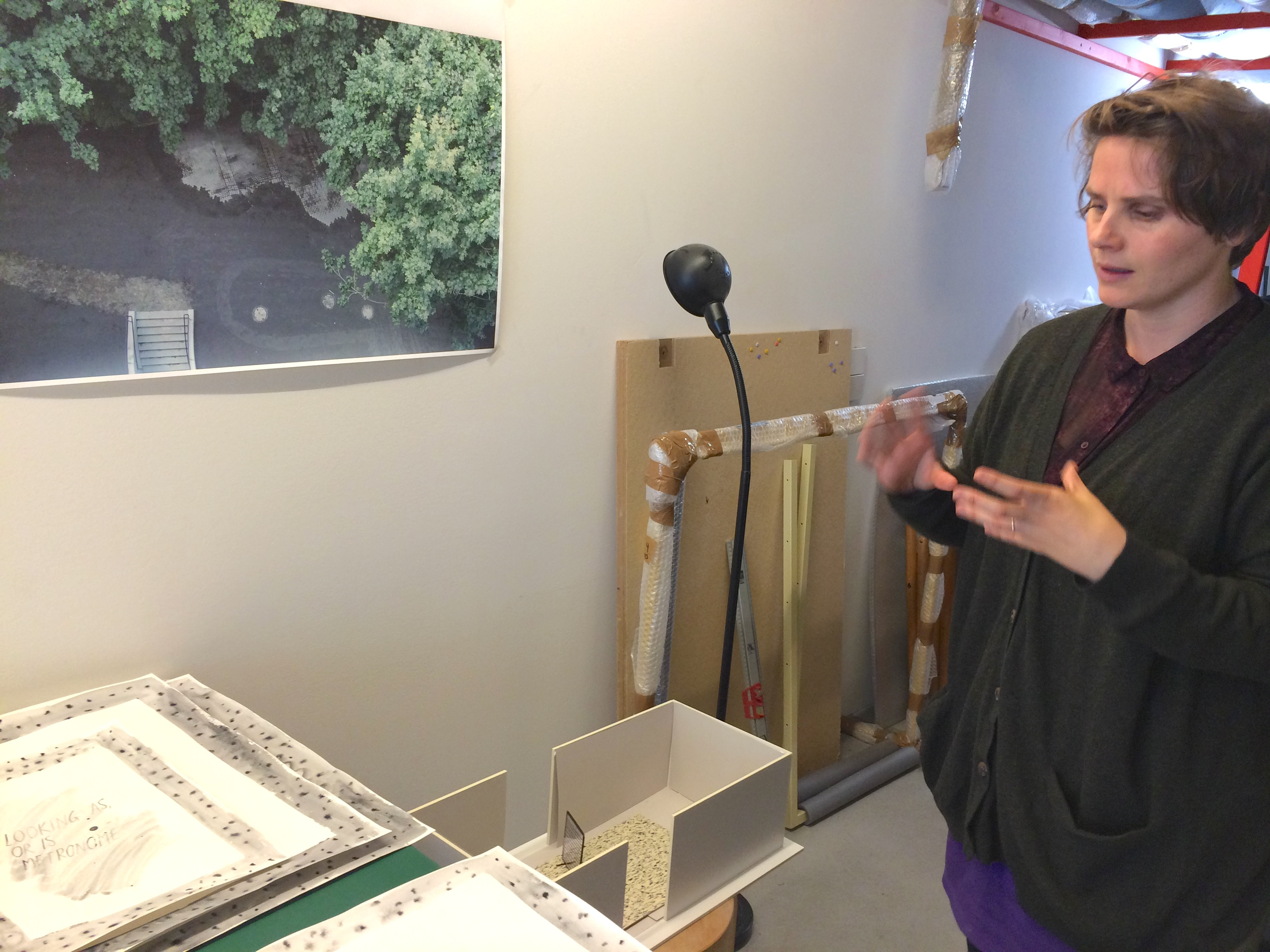
Ruth Buchanan in her Berlin studio, 2014

== Education ==
Buchanan graduated with a Bachelor of Fine Arts from the Elam School of Fine Arts, Auckland, in 2002. She completed a Master of Fine Arts at the Piet Zwart Institute, Rotterdam, Netherlands in 2007. From 2008-09 she was a researcher at the Jan van Eyck Academie in Maastricht, Netherlands.

In 2012 she was Artist in Residence at Colin McCahon House in Auckland, and in 2015 and 2016 she was the Govett-Brewster Art Gallery's Artist in Residence.

== Career ==
Buchanan has exhibited extensively in Europe and in New Zealand. She was represented by Hopkinson Mossman, a contemporary art gallery in New Zealand from 2011-20. In 2018 she was awarded New Zealand's Walters Prize for her groundbreaking project BAD VISUAL SYSTEMS first shown at Adam Art Gallery, working closely with Judith Hopf and Marianne Wex. She works across exhibition making, writing, design, publishing, and teaching. Her work draws out the contested and dynamic relationship between the body, power, language and the archive. This process of contesting often relates closely to the types of relationships that standardised infrastructures, such as archives, libraries, and museums create between our bodies and society at large and actively asks how these relationships could be otherwise. In 2023 Buchanan moved with her family to New Zealand to take up the role of Director Kaitohu of Artspace Aotearoa in Auckland.
