= Shannon Te Ao =

New Zealand artist

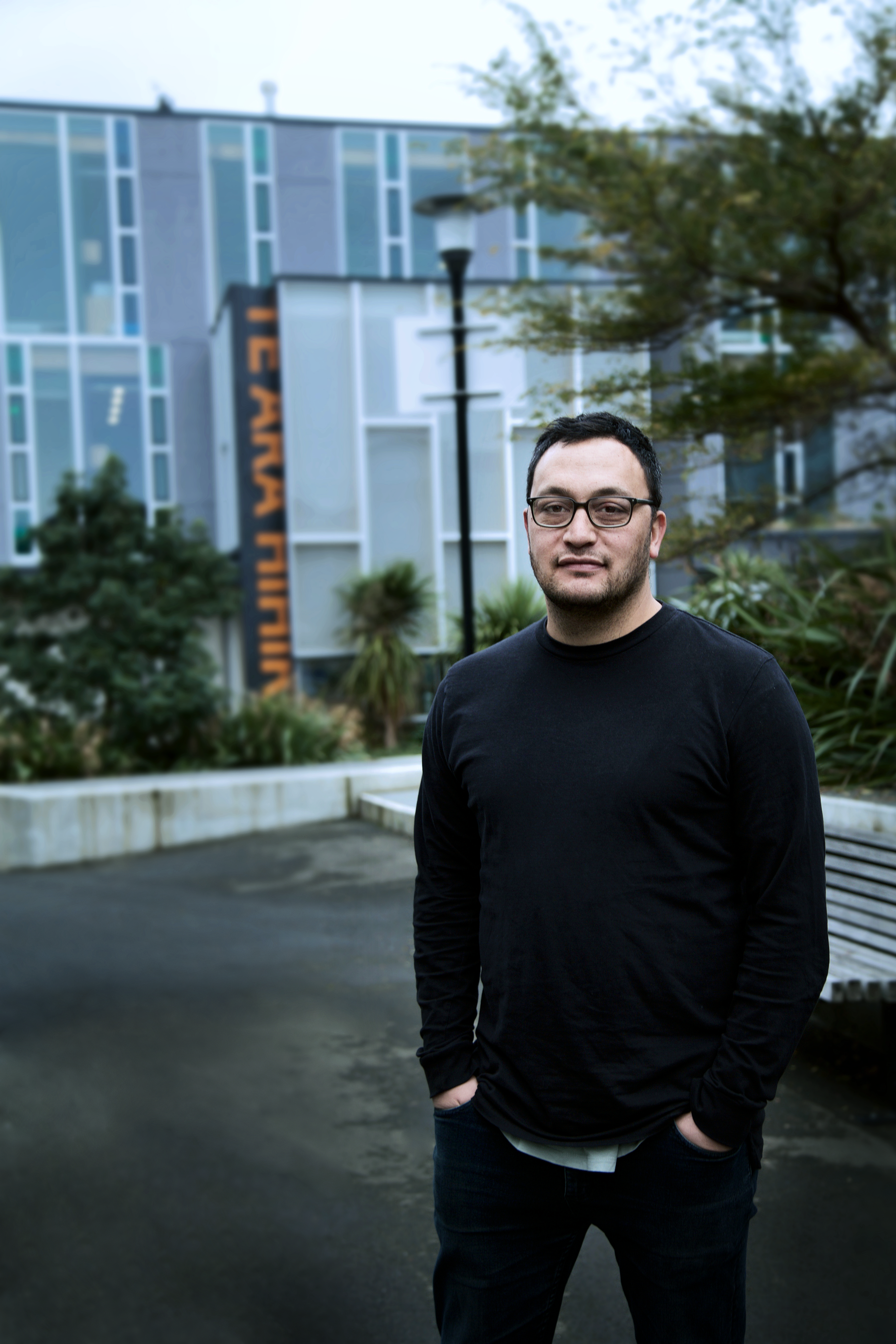
Shannon Te Ao, Massey University, 2016

Shannon Te Ao (born in Sydney in 1978) is a New Zealand artist and writer. He won the 2016 Walters Prize.

== Education ==
Te Ao completed a Bachelor of Fine Arts (Honours) and a Graduate Diploma of Teaching at the University of Auckland. He has a master's degree from Massey University.

== Walters Prize ==
Te Ao was the sole New Zealand artist selected for the 19th Biennale of Sydney in 2014. His video work two shoots that stretch far out (2013–2014) was shown at the Art Gallery of New South Wales for the Biennale. In 2015 the work was shown at City Gallery Wellington alongside drawings by Susan Te Kahurangi King in the exhibition Susan Te Kahurangi King and Shannon Te Ao: From the One I Call My Own.

In March 2016 Te Ao was announced as a finalist for the biennial Walters Prize (New Zealand's largest visual arts prize) for the work. For his presentation in the Walters Prize exhibition at Auckland Art Gallery Te Ao showed two shoots that stretch far out in one room, and in a space leading in to the screening installed Okea ururoatia (never say die) (2016), made of living plants arranged on pallets and lit by hanging lights. He was announced as the winner on 30 September 2016; the award was judged by Doryun Chong.

== Exhibitions ==
2013

- Follow the Party of the Whale, The Blue Oyster Art Project Space

2014

- Follow the Party of the Whale, Adam Art Gallery
- 19th Biennale of Sydney
- Towards doing more, The Physics Room

2015

- Shannon Te Ao: A torch and a light (cover), Te Tuhi Centre for the Arts
- Susan Te Kahurangi King and Shannon Te Ao: From the One I Call My Own, City Gallery Wellington

2016

- Shannon Te Ao: A torch and a light (cover), Hastings City Art Gallery
- Walters Prize Award, Auckland Art Gallery
- Shannon Te Ao: Untitled (malady), Robert Heald Gallery, Wellington

2017

- Shannon Te Ao: Tēnei Ao Kawa Nei, Christchurch Art Gallery
- Shannon Te Ao: Untitled (McCahon House Studies), City Gallery Wellington
- te huka o te tai, Artspace, Auckland
- Shannon Te Ao: With the sun aglow, I have my pensive moods, Edinburgh Art Festival

2018

- Shannon Te Ao: my life as a tunnel, The Dowse Art Museum

== Further information ==
=== Interviews ===
- Five Minutes With Shannon Te Ao, The Brag, 2014
- Shannon Te Ao interviewed by Mark Amery, Circuit, 23 July 2015
- Shannon Te Ao interviewed by Kim Hill, Saturday Morning programme, RNZ, 1 October 2016
- Shannon Te Ao interviewed by Nathan Pohio, Bulletin, Christchurch Art Gallery, February 2017
- Shannon Te Ao interviewed by Lynn Freeman, Standing Room Only, RNZ, 2 July 2017

=== Reviews ===
- Courtney Johnston, Review of Susan Te Kahurangi King and Shannon Te Ao: From the One I Call My Own, Nine to Noon programme, RNZ, 1 July 2015
- Mark Amery Review of Susan Te Kahurangi King and Shannon Te Ao: From the One I Call My Own, NZ Listener, 2 July 2015
- John Hurrell, A New Shannon Te Ao Video, EyeContact, 15 July 2015
- Jessica Hubbard Searching for a Nonverbal Connection, EyeContact, 7 October 2015
- Megan Dunn, The Abode of Indifference, Circuit, 11 October 2015
- John Hurrell, More Is Less: The Walters Prize 2016, EyeContact, 7 August 2016
- Tim Cornwall, Edinburgh Art Festival: artists look to Maori traditions, 19th-century botany and jellyfish, The Art Newspaper, 25 July 2017
- Laura Cumming, Edinburgh art festival review – the dark side of Robert Burns, The Observer, 30 July 2017.
- En Liang Khong Critic’s Guide: Edinburgh, Frieze, 1 August 2017
- Andrew Clifford Shannon Te Ao: With the sun aglow, I have my pensive moods, Contemporary Hum, 4 December 2017
- Matariki Williams, The Singing Word: On Shannon Te Ao’s my life as a tunnel, The Pantograph Punch, 22 June 2018
- Alex Davidson, Critic's pick: Shannon Te Ao, Artforum, July 2018
- Fi Churchman, Future Greats: Shannon Te Ao, Art Review Asia, Summer 2018

=== Books ===
An artist book, I can press my face up against the glass, was published by The Physics Room in 2014. It features essays by Tina Barton, Caterina Riva and Anna-Marie White.

A chapter on Te Ao's work is included in New Zealand writer Anthony Byrt's 2016 book This Model World: Travels to the Edge of Contemporary Art. A still from his 2014 work two shoots that stretch far out was used for the cover of the book. ISBN 978-1-86940-858-9
