= Artspace Aotearoa =

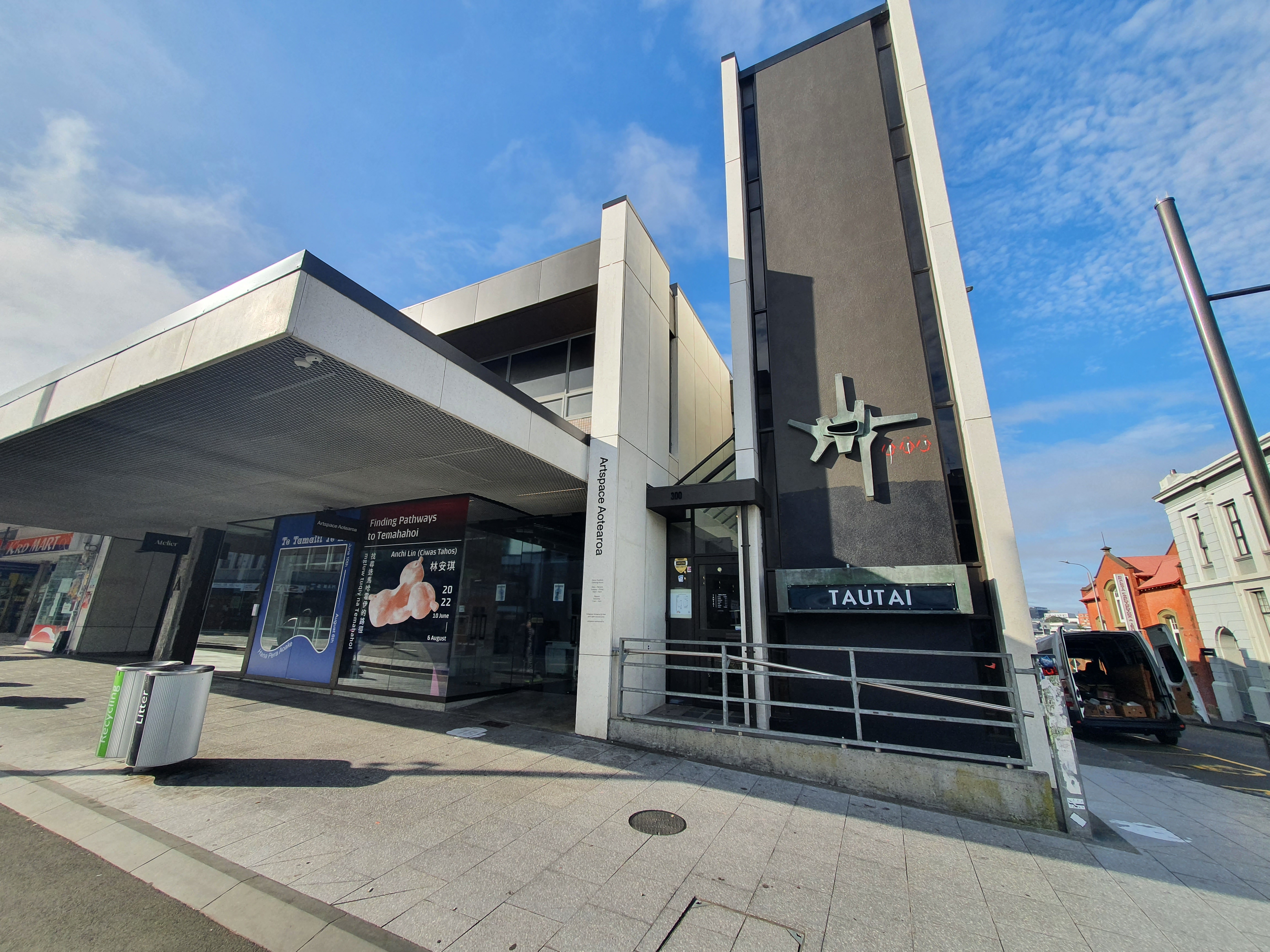
- Artspace Aotearoa and Tautai Pacific Arts Trust on Karangahape Road
- Interactive map of the Artspace Aotearoa area
- Former names: Artspace NZ

General information
- Type: Art Gallery
- Location: 292 Karangahape Road, Auckland, New Zealand
- Coordinates: 36°51′28″S 174°45′29″E

Website
- https://artspace-aotearoa.nz

Artspace Aotearoa (previously known as Artspace NZ) is an art gallery in Auckland, New Zealand. It is located on Karangahape Road in Newton. The gallery was founded in 1987 by a group of artists and focuses on contemporary New Zealand and overseas art.

== Governance ==
Artspace Aotearoa is run by a charitable trust by a board of trustees. The trustees appoint a director for the gallery who has a tenure lasting up to three years, during which time they select the exhibition programme. The frequent change of directors by this system allows for a fresh approach to be taken to the gallery's programme regularly.

The inaugural director was Mary-Louise Browne. Subsequent directors have included Priscilla Pitts, Lara Bowen, Robert Leonard, Tobias Berger, Brian D. Butler, Emma Bugden, Caterina Riva, Misal Adnan Yildiz, Remco de Blaaij and currently (2023 - ) artist-curator Ruth Buchanan.

== Programming ==
As a trust-run gallery, Artspace Aotearoa is able to commission conceptual work by emerging artists whose portfolios are not yet developed enough to command space is major public galleries. Despite this, their exhibitions include works by many major and upcoming New Zealand artists. The gallery includes a public reading room available for research, and runs and promotes numerous education programmes.

For several years during the early 2000s, the gallery also hosted an annual festival of experimental music, "ARTSPACE/alt.music".

Artists who have exhibited at Artspace Aotearoa include:

- Billy Apple (1997, 2004, and 2015)
- Yuki Kihara (2017)
- Justine Kurland (2002)
- Michael Parekowhai (1999)
- Peter Robinson (1998 and 2006)
- Ava Seymour (1997)
- Saul Steinberg (2012)
- Shannon Te Ao (2017)
- Francis Upritchard (2005)
- Ronnie van Hout (1997)

In 2021, Artspace Aotearoa hosted a fundraiser titled When The Dust Settles. According to curator Victoria McAdam:

This four-part exhibition series and fundraising auction sees 34 seminal artists return to the gallery, offering significant works for presentation and sale. The list of participating artists ricochets through the programming history of the organisation, calling on both foundational artists and more recent alumni, including Billy Apple®, Stella Brennan, Phil Dadson, Brett Graham, Nikau Hindin, Claudia Kogachi, Judy Millar, Dane Mitchell, Fiona Pardington, Peter Robinson, Yvonne Todd and others. Together, this cast articulates decades of shifting cultural dynamics, signalling who has championed, shaped and benefited from our contemporary art spaces, and those who will attend to their futures.

== See also ==
- The Physics Room
- Blue Oyster Art Project Space
