= Terri Te Tau =

New Zealand contemporary artist and writer

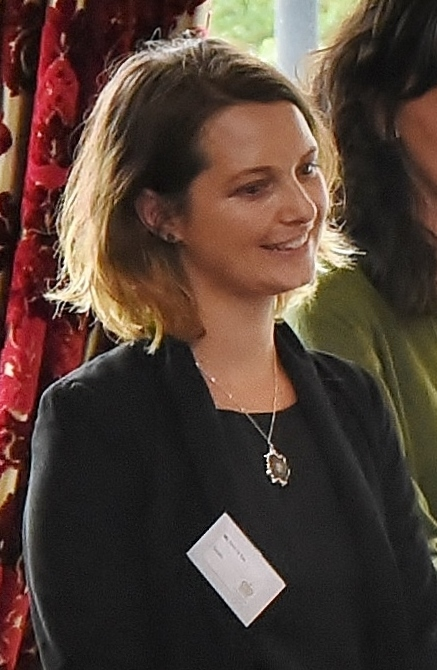
- Te Tau at the Venice Biennale Youth Forum in 2017
- Education: Massey University
- Website: https://www.territetau.com/

Terri Te Tau is a New Zealand contemporary artist and writer. She is a member of the Mataaho Collective. In 2017, the collective represented New Zealand at documenta, a quinquennial contemporary-art exhibition held in Kassel, Germany. This was the first time New Zealand artists had been invited to present their work at the event.

Te Tau, who is of Rangitāne and Ngāti Kahungunu descent, was raised in the Wairarapa region She received her tertiary education at Massey University, where she is a lecturer at the Whiti o Rehua School of Art. Her doctoral thesis was on a conceptual Māori response to state surveillance.

Funding from the Earle CreativityTrust led to an exhibition held at Te Manawa, a museum in Palmerston North, in October 2015.
