= Enjoy Contemporary Art Space =

- Established: 2000
- Location: Wellington, New Zealand 41.29355°S 174.77605°E
- Type: Contemporary art gallery
- Founders: Ros Cameron, Ciaran Begley, Rachel Smithies
- Website: www.enjoy.org.nz

Enjoy Contemporary Art Space is a contemporary art space in Cuba Street arts area of Wellington, New Zealand. Enjoy was founded in 2000 by artists Ciaran Begley, Ros Cameron and Rachel Smithies as an artist-run space. Today, Enjoy operates as a not-for-profit contemporary art space, presenting exhibitions, publications, public programmes and residencies by emerging and mid-career artists. In addition to staging exhibitions, Enjoy regularly publishes critical writing online as well as printed exhibition catalogues and art related publications.

The gallery has been based at three locations throughout its lifespan. Between 2000 and 2006, the gallery was based at a first floor space at 174 Cuba St. In 2006, the gallery relocated to Level 1, 147 Cuba St. In 2019, the gallery moved again to a ground floor space at 211 Left Bank, off Cuba Mall.

Enjoy is governed by a Board of Trustees, made up of Wellington-based artists and arts professionals. Between 2001 and 2019, the organisation was called Enjoy Public Art Gallery. Enjoy is supported by Creative New Zealand and the Wellington City Council.

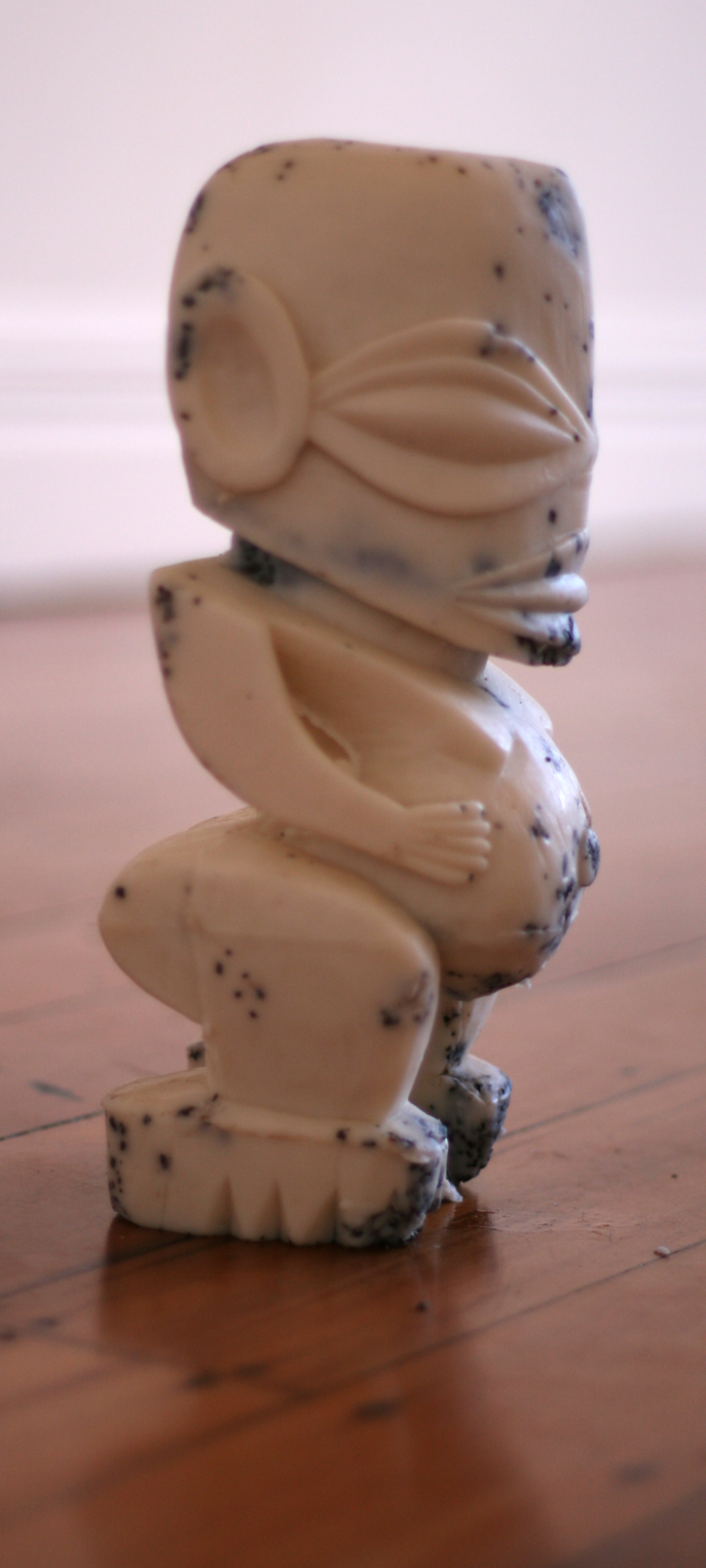
One of the group of Tagaloa figures by Paula Schaafhausen in the 'Ebbing Tagaloa' exhibition
