= Charlotte Fisher =

New Zealand sculptor (born 1959)

- Born: 1959 (age 66–67); Whangārei
- Education: University of Auckland, Elam School of Fine Arts
- Occupation: Sculptor
- Spouse: Robert Fisher

Charlotte Fisher (born 1959) is a contemporary sculptor from New Zealand, born in Whangārei.

== Career ==
She began her art career by completing a Bachelor of Arts in Art History in 1981 and a Bachelor of Fine Arts in Sculpture at the University of Auckland and Elam School of Fine Arts in 1989. Fisher started exhibiting both solo and group exhibitions after her studies, with much influence coming from her Elam lecturers Greer Twiss and Christine Hellyar.

Her practice can be identified through her explorations of abstracted shapes, and the use of found and organic materials, such as recycled wood and jetsam rescued from coastlines. The sea and boats are recognised as key symbols throughout her works.

Fisher has taken on multiple public art commissions for Auckland Council including but not limited to works for Grey Lynn Park, Oranga Community Centre, Alison Park on Waiheke Island, and a 1996 Sky City commission entitled Arrival for the hotel's Sculpture Court. Likewise her pieces are held in a variety of national collections, such as the Treasury, Victoria University, Te Papa Tongarewa Museum of New Zealand, Christchurch Art Gallery, and Whangārei Art Museum. She is also a supporter of the Wellington Sculpture Trust.

== Exhibitions ==
Group shows
Date	Title	People	Medium	Location	Source
1991	The Letter Box Show	Andrew Bull, Bill McKay, Charlotte Fisher, Donna Hoyle, Gary Hunt, Gavin Chilcott, Grey Linn, Hurricane Brand, Jane Greensmith, Jane Zusters, Jeff Thomson, Joanna Klein, John Hughes, John Papas, John Reynolds, Kalvin Collins, Mal Bartlett, Malcolm Taylor, Malcolm Walker, Michael Fisher, Neil Kirkland, Pete Bossley, Peter Rogers, Philippa Blair, Pip Cheshire, Rewi Thompson, Richard Priest, Rick Pearson, Rudi Schwarz, Sarah McKenny, Todd Strathdee, Valeska Campion, and Warren Viscoe	Sculptural Installation	Te Tuhi	
2003	- -	Jee-Young Kim, Julia Holderness, Oli Perkins, Jesse Watson, Gretchen Albrecht, Chiara Corbelletto, Geoff Dixon, Charlotte Fisher, Allan Maddox, Peter Panyoczki, James Ross, and Wayne Seyb	- -	Bath Street Gallery	
2003	- -	Charlotte Fisher and Phil Murray	- -	Bath Street Gallery	
2004	- -	Tom Sladden, Helen Calder, Clare Noonan, Kim Pieters, Jo Bruce-Smith, Alice Blackley, Virginia King, Julia Holderness, Mary McIntyre, Charlotte Fisher, and Mary Barker	- -	Bath Street Gallery	
2005	- -	Charlotte Fisher, Chiara Corbelletto, Virginia King, Christine Hellyar, and Katrina Beekuis	- -	Bath Street Gallery	
2006	- -	Jee-Young Kim, Fane Flaws, Leon van den Eijkel, Kim Pieters, Harvey Benge, Simon Ogden, Kathryn Stevens, Mark Braunias, James Ross, Geoff Dixon, Gregor Kregar, Denys Watkins, Charlotte Fisher, Riduan Tomkins, Malcolm Terry, James Robinson, Grant Beran, Gill Gatfield, Katie Thomas, Barbara Bailey, Christine Hellyar, Jo Bruce-Smith, Peter Gibson Smith, Louise Purvis, Peter Panyoczki, and Kazu Nakagawa	- -	Bath Street Gallery	
2007	- -	Charlotte Fisher and Louise Purvis	- -	Bath Street Gallery	
2007	Auckland Art Fair exhibition	Charlotte Fisher, Gregor Kregar, James Robinson, James Ross, Leon van den Eijkel, and Denys Watkins	- -	Bath Street Gallery/Auckland Art Fair	
2008	- -	Mark Braunias, Charlotte Fisher, Peter Gibson Smith, Robert Jahnke, Jonathan Jones, Jee-Young Kim, Kazu Nakagawa, Simon Ogden, Louise Purvis, James Robinson, James Ross, Kathryn Stevens, Katie Thomas, Leon van den Eijkel, and Denys Watkins	- -	Bath Street Gallery	
2013	- -	Charlotte Fisher and Tony Bond	- -	Bath Street Gallery	
2014	- -	Mark Braunias, Katie Thomas, Lang Ea, Adrian Jackman, Kazu Nakagawa, Mary-Louise Brown, Charlotte Fisher, Peter Gibson Smith, Peter Panyoczki, Dianne Scott, Jon Tootill, Roger Boyce, Robert McLeod, Jade Moulden, and Denys Watkins	- -	Bath Street Gallery	
2014	- -	Mark Braunias, Charlotte Fisher, Peter Gibson Smith, Island6, Robert Jahnke, Kazu Nakagawa, Peter Panyoczki, Louise Purvis, Bronwyn Taylor, and Denys Watkins	- -	Bath Street Gallery	
2015	- -	Roger Boyce, Jude Broughan, Mark Braunias, Iain Cheesman, Charlotte Fisher, Peter Gibson Smith, Claudia Jowitt, Jae Kang, Kazu Nakagawa, Simon Ogden, Anton Parsons, Peter Panyoczki, Jessica Pearless, Joe Prisk, Dane Taylor, Jon Tootill, Vaimaila Urale, Leon van den Eijkel, and Denys Watkins	- -	Bath Street Gallery	
2015	Sydney Contemporary exhibition	Mark Braunias, Charlotte Fisher, Peter Gibson Smith, Robert Jahnke, Claudia Jowitt, Kazu Nakagawa, Peter Panyoczki, Anton Parsons, Jessica Pearless, Louise Purvis, Jon Tootill, Leon van den Eijkel, and Denys Watkins	- -	Bath Street Gallery/Sydney Contemporary	
2016	- -	Roger Boyce, Mark Braunias, Chiara Corbelletto, Charlotte Fisher, Peter Gibson Smith, Robert Jahnke, Claudia Jowitt, Kazu Nakagawa, Simon Ogden, Peter Panyoczki, Anton Parsons, Jessica Pearless, Louise Purvis, Jon Tootill, Leon van den Eijkel, and Denys Watkins	- -	Bath Street Gallery	
2016	Auckland Art Fair exhibition	Mark Braunias, Charlotte Fisher, Jessica Pearless, Louise Purvis, Jon Tootill, Denys Watkins, and Peter Panyoczki	- -	Bath Street Gallery/Auckland Art Fair	
2024	Lovers & Castaways	Gretchen Albrecht, Philippa Blair, Nigel Brown, Debra Bustin, Gavin Chilcott, Gordon Crook, Julian Dashper, Moyra Elliot, Charlotte Fisher, Tony Fomison, Dick Frizzell, Joan Grehan, Bill Hammond, Philip Heath, Pat Hanly, Christine Hellyar, Louise Henderson, Ralph Hotere, Alexis Hunter, Michael Illingworth, Megan Jenkinson, Emily Karaka, Richard Killeen, Diana Lee Gobbitt, Ron Left, Allen Maddox, Joanna Margaret Paul, Buck Nin, John Reynolds, Michael Smither, Terry Stringer, Marte Szirmay, Alan Taylor, Kura Te Waru Rewiri, Greer Twiss, Jim Vivieare, Mervyn Williams, Brent Wong, et al.	- -	Pah Homestead	

Solo shows
Date	Title	Medium	Location	Source
1988	Homage to Polynesian Navigators	Australian hardwood, driftwood	The Arts House Trust Collection	
1991	Reflected Pools	Sculpture	Te Ngākau / Civic Square, Wellington Central	
1991	The Sculptor's Workshop	Window Work	Auckland Art Gallery	
1993	- -	Three large sculptural works in stone, steel and found objects	Fisher Gallery, Pakuranga, Manukau City	
1994	Untitled	Paint, copper, wood	The Arts House Trust Collection	
1996	Arch	Wood sculpture	Grey Lynn Park, Auckland	
1996	Landsong	Wood, Copper, Bronze, Paint in Sculpture	School of Architecture and Design, Te Herenga Waka Victoria University of Wellington, Te Whanganui-a-Tara Wellington	
1998	Red Head	Kauri, Australian hardwood	Janne Land Gallery Wellington collection	
1999	Siren	Driftwood, Australian hardwood, acrylic paint	Christchurch Art Gallery Te Puna o Waiwhetū	
2000	Sentinel	Bronze, stone	The Hub Information Centre, Dent St, Whangārei	
2001	Sculpture 2001	Eight sculptures	Auckland Domain	
2003	Rock	Bronze	The Arts House Trust Collection	
2004	Arc	Granite and bronze sculpture	Edmiston Trust Collection, Auckland Domain Sculpture Walk	
2004	Rarotonga Gateway	Corten steel, granite	Oranga Community Centre in Fergusson Domain	
2007	Slit	Steel, paint	Alison Park, Waiheke Island	
2007	Sculpture on the Gulf exhibition	- -	Church Bay coastal walkway, Matiatia	
2006	9 Billion	- -	For NZ Sculpture OnShore, Fort Takapuna Historic Reserve, Vauxhall Road, Devonport	
2010	- -	- -	Bath Street Gallery	
2013	My how you've grown	Coral, baby teeth, wood	The Arts House Trust Collection	
2015	Line Drawing: The Abyss	Digital print on Ilford gallerie smooth cotton rag	The Arts House Trust Collection	

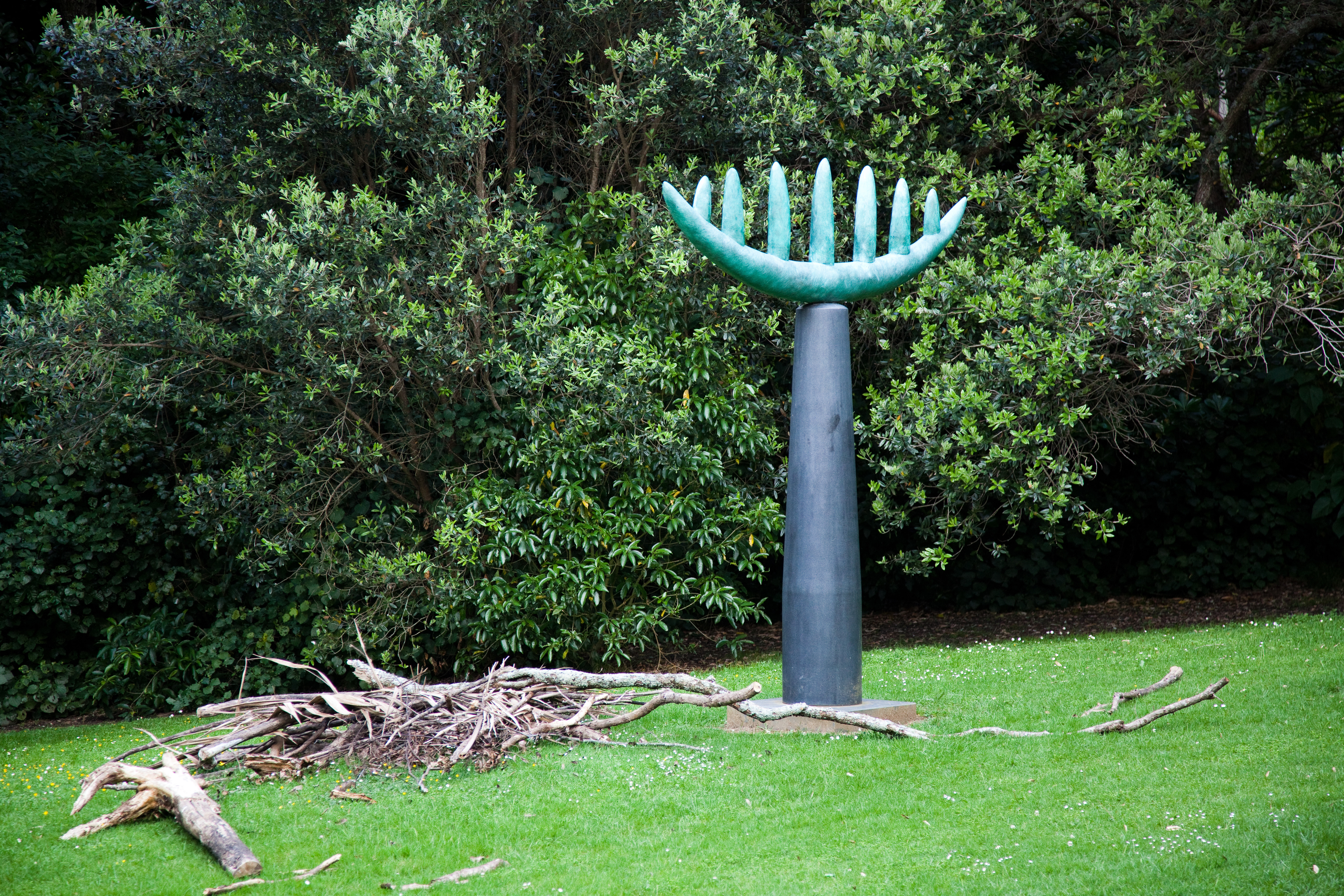
Arc (2004), Charlotte Fisher, Granite and bronze

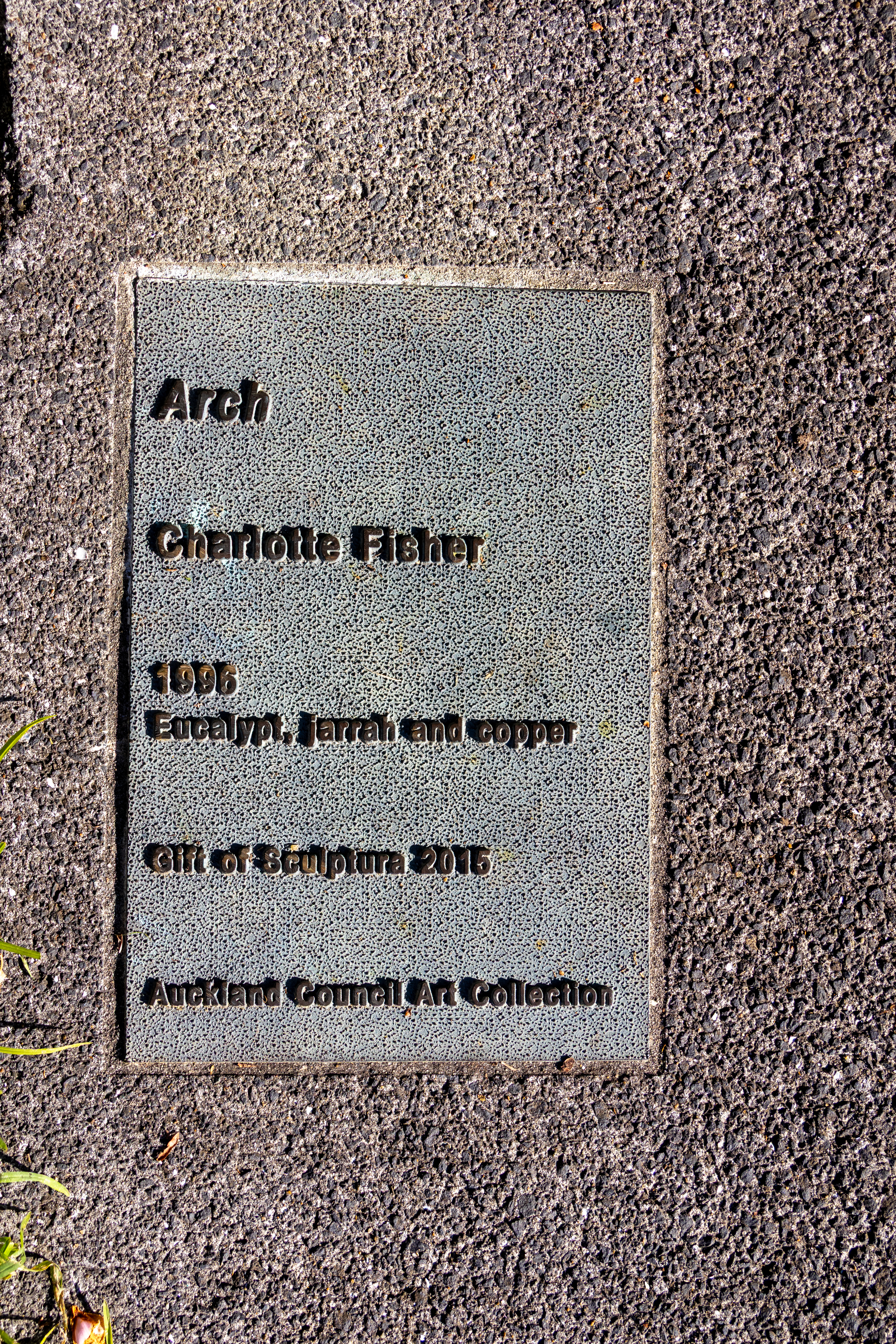
Plaque for Arch, Grey Lynn Park, Auckland, Charlotte Fisher, 1996.

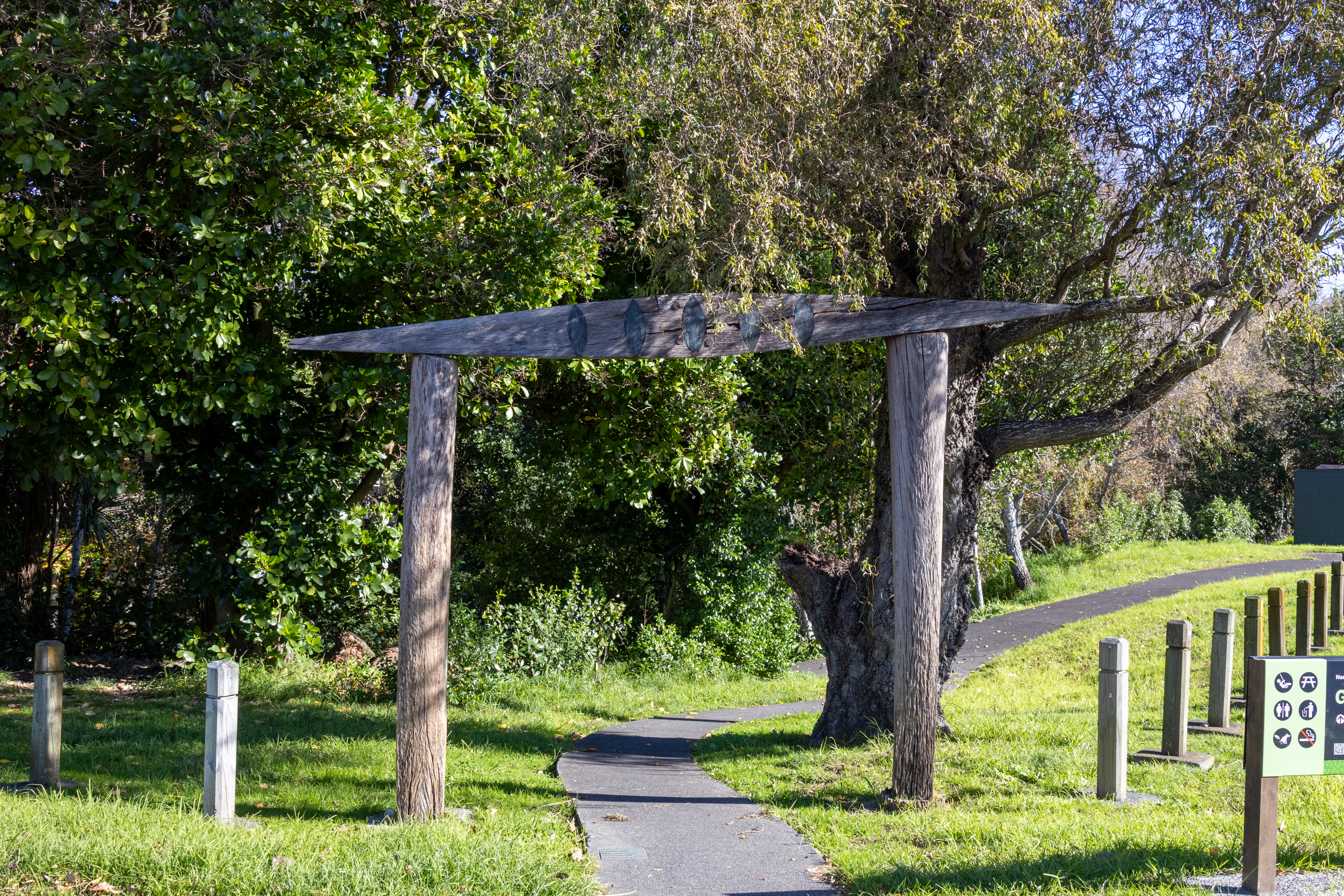
Arch, Charlotte Fisher, Grey Lynn Park

== Secondary projects ==
- Publication: Signs and Markers: a Sculpture Survey, published 1998
- In mid December 2023 as former NZ Nature Fund chair, Fisher went on a subantarctic and Chatham Islands voyage for 16 days on the Heritage Adventurer with her husband Robert, and friend Kim Hill.

== Residencies ==
- 1993: Rita Angus Artist-in-Residence, Wellington

== Recognition ==
- On the 20th February 1991 the Press newspaper reported Fisher as being one of eight New Zealand artists chosen by writer and art critic Ian Wedde for "The South of the World: the other contemporary art" exhibition in Sicily, Rome and Milan. Her artwork and writing were both included in the exhibition and its catalogue alongside the contributions of Chris Booth, Robert Jahnke, Tony Lane, Lisa Reihana, Barbara Strathdee, and Ruth Watson.
- Regarding her 1993 Sculpture Court exhibition Te Tuhi recognised Fisher has a "significant young contemporary sculptor."
- The 2007 edition of Art+Object's art catalogue includes work by Fisher, as well as Billy Apple, Neil Dawson, Bronwynne Cornish, Don Driver, Michael Illingworth, Bill Hammond, Tony Fomison, Colin McCahon, Don Binney, and Ralph Hotere.
