= Peter Nicholls (artist) =

New Zealand artist (1936–2021)

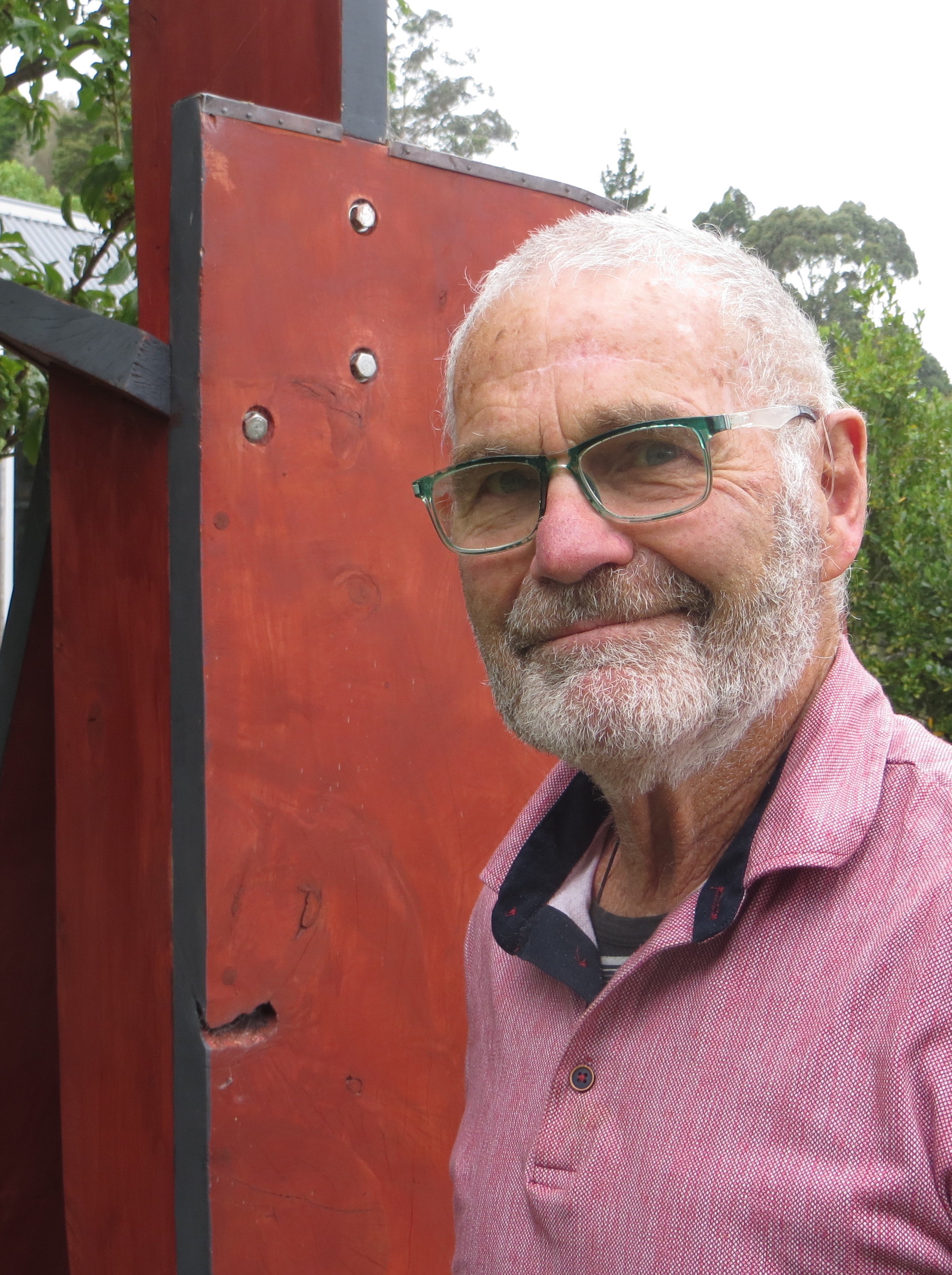
- Nicholls, March 2019
- Born: Peter Clement Fife Nicholls; 27 April 1936; Whanganui, New Zealand
- Died: 3 February 2021 (aged 84); Dunedin, New Zealand
- Known for: Sculpture
- Spouse(s): Di ffrench (died 1999); Stephanie Bate (married 2001)

Peter Clement Fife Nicholls (27 April 1936 – 3 February 2021) was a New Zealand artist who created large, outdoor works. His public art sculptures, often combining steel and native timbers, commented on the New Zealand landscape and its colonial history.

== Life ==
Nicholls was born in Whanganui, New Zealand in 1936. He was educated at the Canterbury University School of Fine Arts in Christchurch, the Auckland Teachers' College, and the University of Auckland Elam School of Fine Arts. In the 1960s he spent some time as an Auckland high school art teacher.

Nicholls was married to the artist Di ffrench for more than thirty years, until her death in 1999. They had four children. In 2001 he married Steph Bate, a registered nurse. He lived and worked in Dunedin, New Zealand. The Dunedin Public Art Gallery presented Journeywork, a major retrospective of Nicholls's career, in 2008.

A stroke in 2019 restricted Nicholls' ability to sculpt, though he continued producing smaller-scale works. Nicholls suffered a second stroke in January 2021 from which he never fully recovered. He died in Dunedin on 3 February 2021.

== Career ==
Nicholls first gained critical notice in the early 1970s with Probe, a series of large, outdoor works that used native kanuka timber to evoke the old log fences of rural New Zealand. Works from the series were displayed in 1972 outside the Osborne Gallery in Auckland and in 1973 at the Mildura Sculpture Triennial. According to art critic Jodie Dalgleish, "The Probe series had subtly begun to explore what would become Nicholls's central interest in an artistically motivated kind of physics concerned with the matter, energy, motion and force of sculptural structure and its interactions with natural and cultural forces."

In the mid to late 1970s, Nicholls created his New Land sculpture series. Produced at a time when New Zealanders were reassessing their colonial history, the series explores the impact of settler culture on the native landscape. Nicholls is himself a descendant of the writer and missionary the Rev. Richard Taylor, who was present at the signing of the Treaty of Waitangi. New Land III (1975), made from chiselled beams of totara, wire, and steel, is today in the Auckland Art Gallery Toi o Tāmaki.

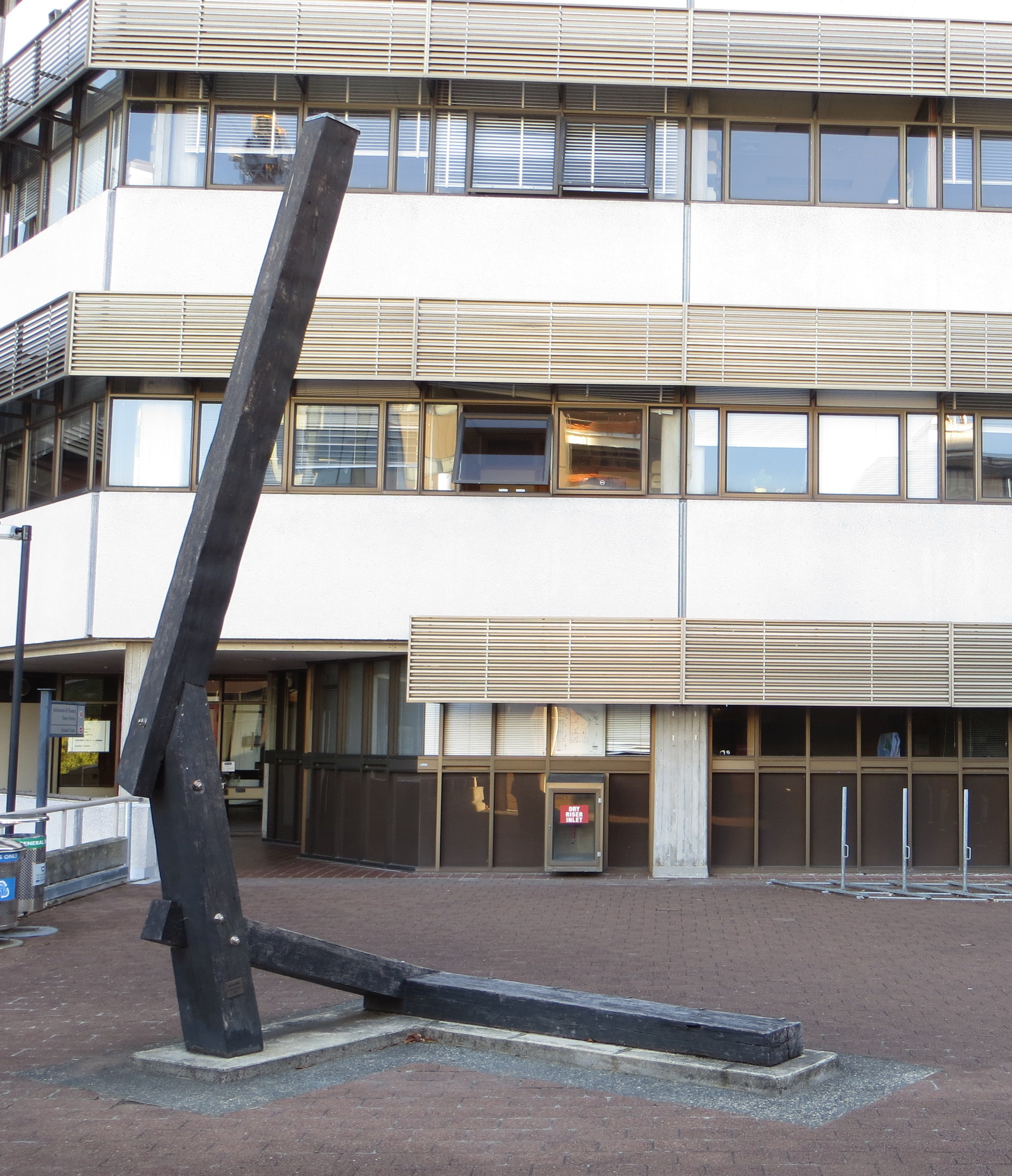
Peter Nicholls's Measure in the courtyard of the University of Auckland School of Architecture and Planning

In 1978 Nicholls represented New Zealand at a Sculpture Symposium held in tandem with the Edmonton 1978 Commonwealth Games. While there, Nicholls created the thirteenth work in the New Land series, which would serve as the maquette for a major kinetic sculpture, Counterpoise (1978), commissioned for the Muttart Conservatory in Edmonton. His time at the University of Wisconsin-Superior resulted in the Wisconsin series: Wisconsin 7, renamed Measure (1981), today stands in the courtyard of the University of Auckland School of Architecture and Planning.

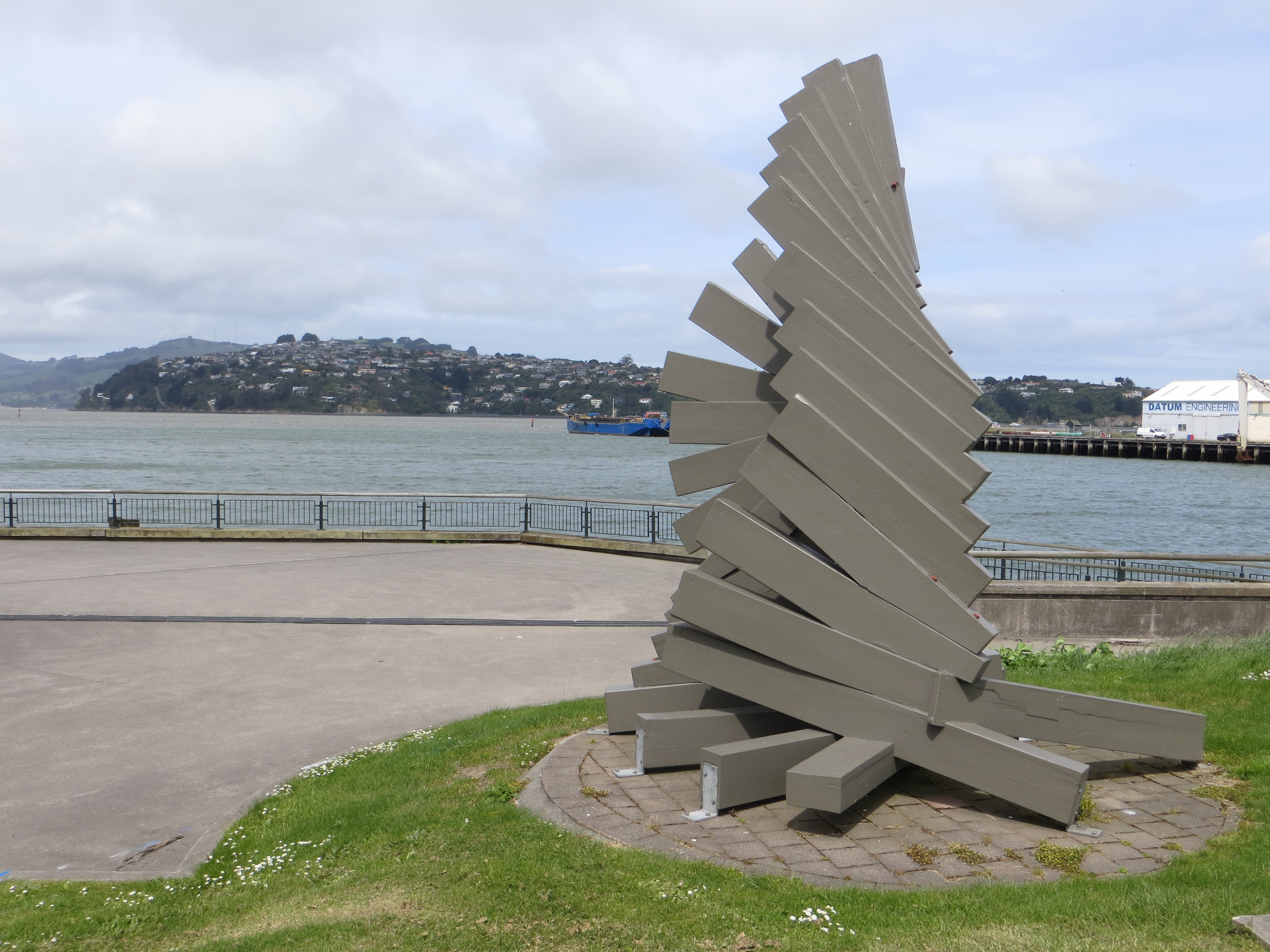
Peter Nicholls's Toroa on the Otago Harbour in Dunedin, New Zealand

In the 1980s, Nicholls produced a number of large-scale sculptures that "explored and related the socio-spatial effects of art and architecture." Several of these works, including Spine (1986, Auckland Domain, near the Auckland War Memorial Museum) and Toroa (1989, Dunedin Public Art Gallery, on display in the Dunedin Harbour Basin), position large cuts of wood in ways that overtly reference skeletal movement. Academic Peter Leech has commented that Toroa (the Māori word for albatross) captures "the paradox of flight in that winged ponderousness and spine muscularity of the bird heaving its half ton-ness off the ground in a ruffle of massive feathers." Another major work, Bridge (1985–86), was commissioned by the University of Otago and stands near the centre of the university campus. "In Bridge," writes poet and art critic David Eggleton, "Nicholls created an arch of arrested movement from huge railway bridge beams that ... appear to twirl yet are suspended frozen, bolted together."

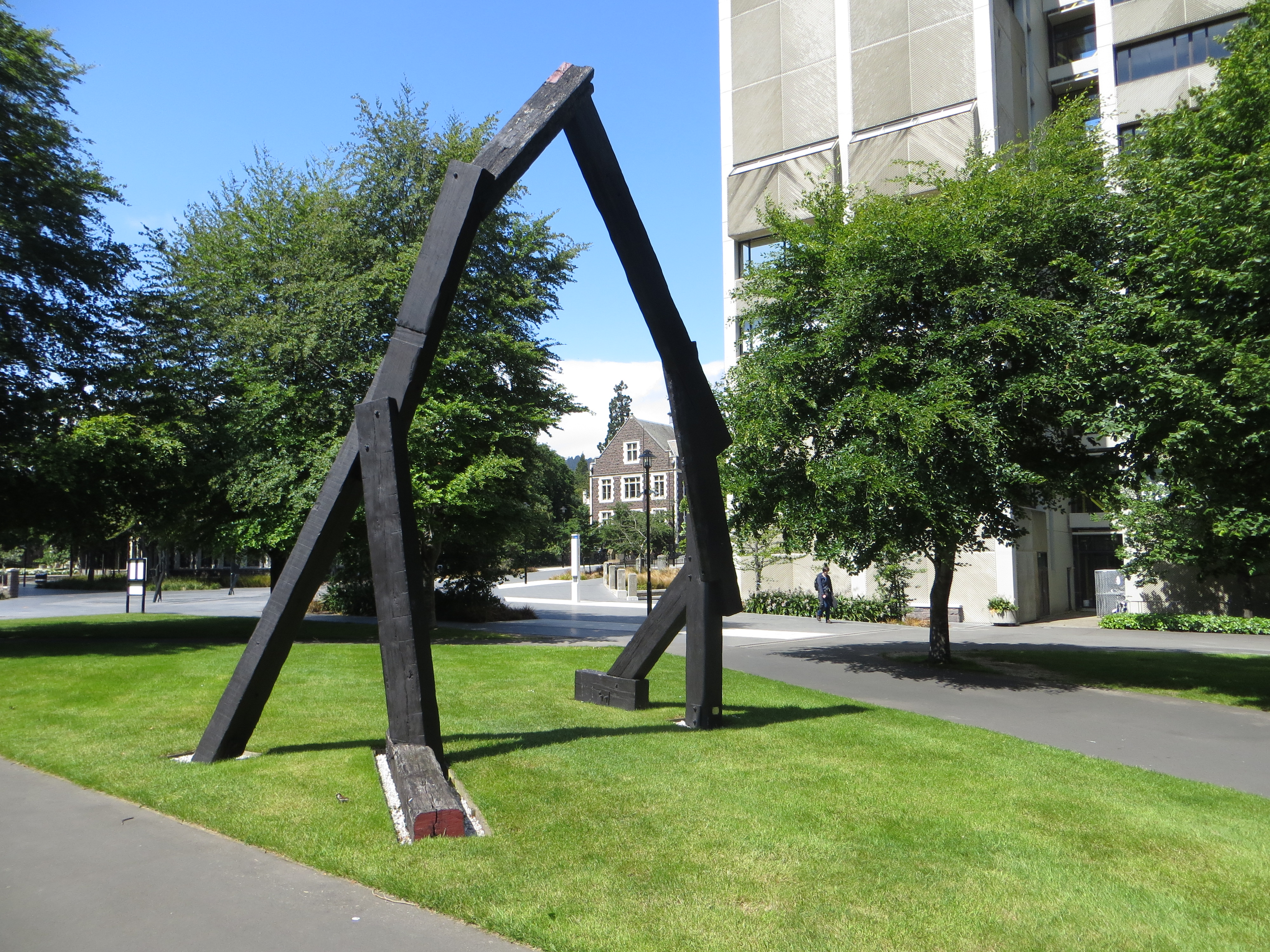
Peter Nicholls's Bridge on the campus of the University of Otago in Dunedin, New Zealand

In 1989, Nicholls spent three months in Europe and found new inspiration in recent sculptural works like Andy Goldsworthy's Sidewinder (1985) in Grizedale Forest and Kier Smith's Iron Road (1986) in the Forest of Dean Sculpture Trail. An important work produced in the wake of these experiences was Whanganui (1990), today in the collection of the Sarjeant Gallery. This complex work was inspired by a journey undertaken by Nicholls's ancestor Richard Taylor along the Whanganui River. Made of two native woods, rimu and totara, and two woods introduced to the area by Taylor, willow and poplar, the winding, nine-metre work imitates the movement of the river, but various objects embedded into the wood (a river paddle, a brass compass, a Māori adze-head) suggest the impact of both native and settler culture. In the late 1990s and early 2000s, Nicholls created some of his largest and most recognised sculptures. Rakaia (1996–97) is Nicholls's contribution to the international sculpture collection at Gibbs Farm, north of Auckland;Tomo (2005) is at the Connells Bay Sculpture Park on Waiheke Island; and Junction (2009) stands near the railway line at New Lynn, Auckland. Junction features prominently in the 2015 music video for Anthonie Tonnon's song Railway Lines. In 2013, Nicholls gifted another large work, Moorings, to the city of Whanganui, his birthplace. The work, which references the Whanganui River's nine tributaries, is sited beside the river at Moutua Quay.

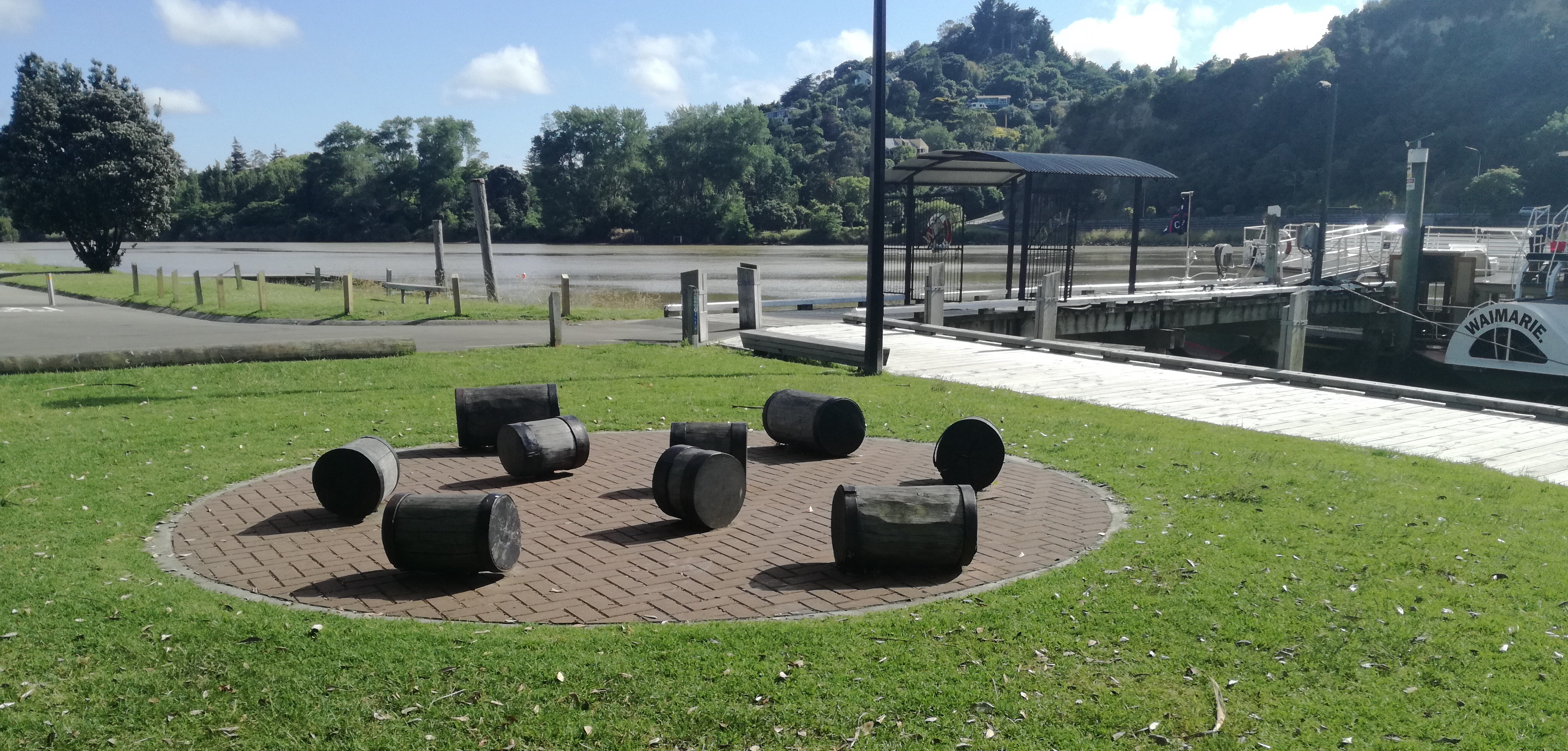
Peter Nicholls's sculpture Moorings on the Whanganui waterfront

In a 2007 interview, Nicholls explained his philosophy of art: "My work has always concerned the land. Travel and teaching has been an important part of this. The time and materials, and our use of all such resources, are a constant in my work. I never cut living trees on principle, being committed to creating ‘new life’ from discards. Thus, in the materials and the forms, there is the dialectic of the ephemeral and the permanent, life and its short space within time."

At least two portraits of Nicholls are owned by major New Zealand national collections. Adrienne Martyn’s 1985 photograph, "Peter Nicholls, Sculptor, Auckland 22.4.85," is held at the Museum of New Zealand Te Papa Tongarewa. Alan Pearson's 1986 oil on canvas, "Portrait of the sculptor Peter Nicholls," is in the collection of the Auckland Art Gallery Toi o Tāmaki.

In 2022, the illustrated book, Peter Nicholls — Sculptor: Dynamics / Memory / Grace, was published. Edited by Don Hunter and introduced by Priscilla Pitts, this publication illustrates Nicholls' 60 years of prolific sculpture work including his studio notes, drawings, photos, and quotes from writers who engaged with this work. Writers include David Eggleton, James Dignan, Jodie Dalgleish, Peter Entwisle, Bill Milbank, Cassandra Fusco, and Peter Leech.

A retrospective of Nicholls' art was shown at Dunedin's Fe29 Gallery in September 2025.
