= Minnie Izett =

New Zealand artist (1862–1924)

Minnie P. Izett (1862–1924) was a New Zealand artist. Her work is held in the collection of the Sarjeant Gallery in Wanganui.

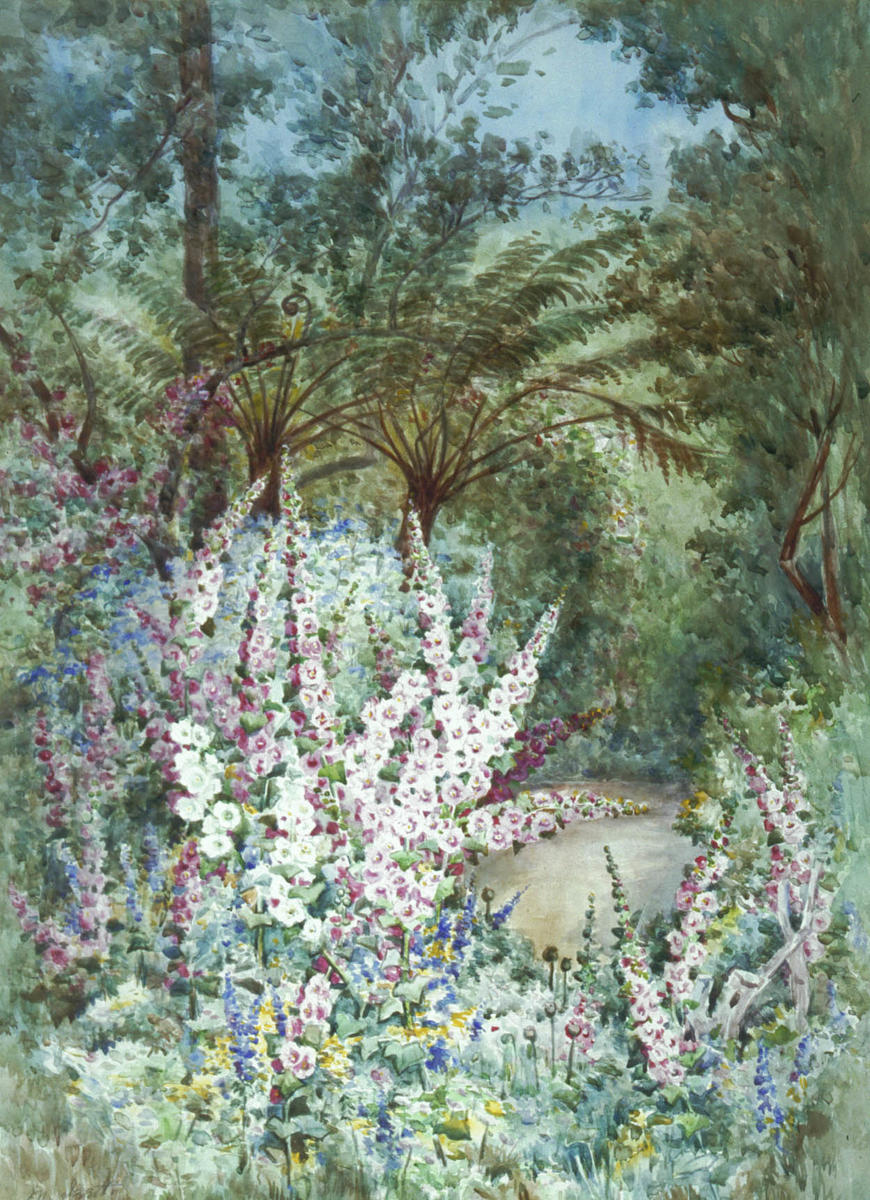
Izett's work "A New Zealand Garden"

== Biography ==
Izett was born in Dunedin. She was an art teacher at Wanganui Technical School in the early 1900s. Izett exhibited at the Auckland Society of Arts, Canterbury Society of Arts, Otago Art Society and the New Zealand Academy of Fine Arts.
