= Ōwairaka, Statue of a Cloaked Woman =

Statue in Auckland, New Zealand

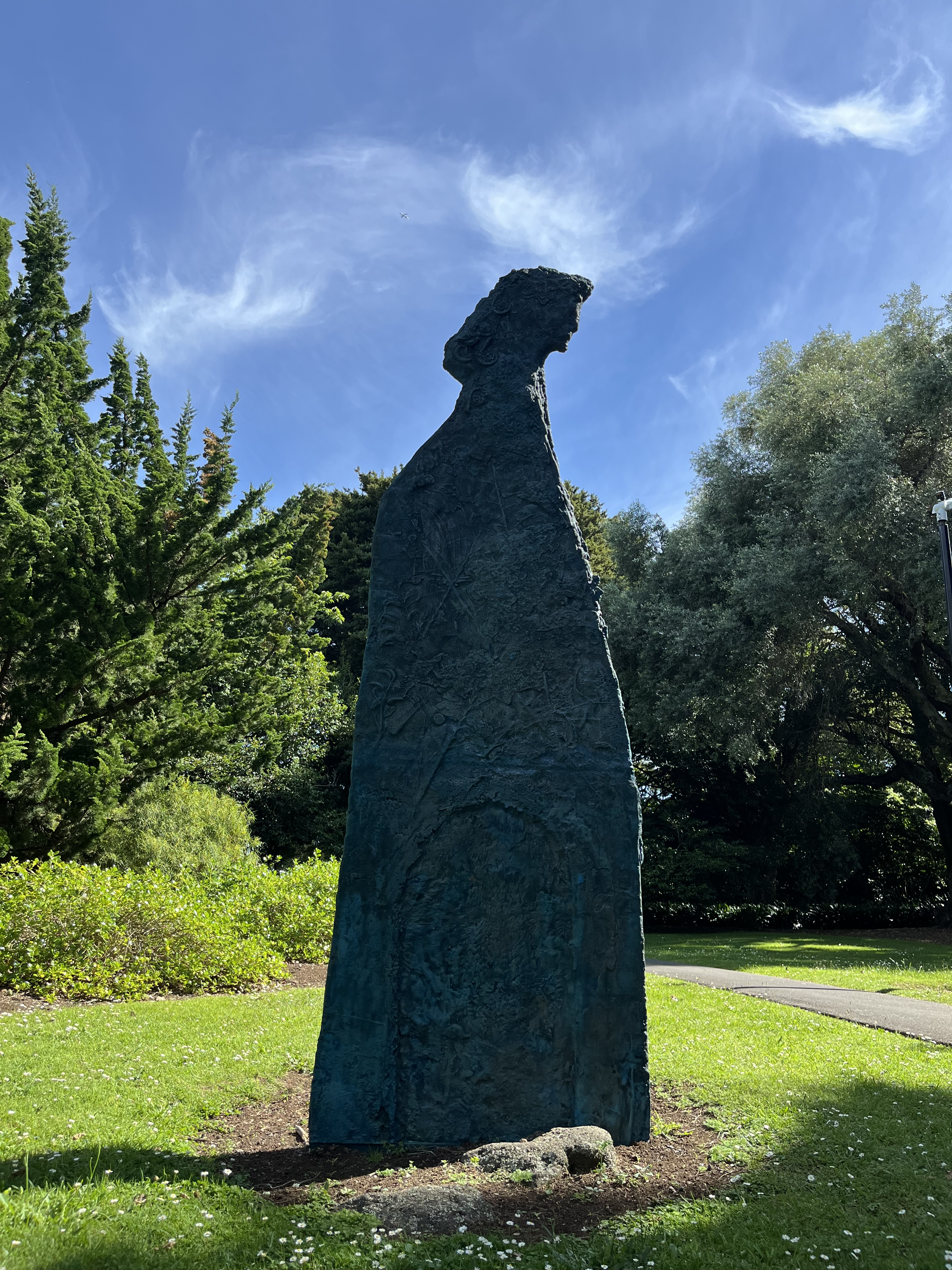
- The sculpture photographed in 2024
- Interactive map of Ōwairaka, Statue of a Cloaked Woman
- Location: Mount Albert, Auckland, New Zealand
- Coordinates: 36°52′51″S 174°43′23″E
- Designer: Christine Hellyar
- Material: Bronze
- Opening date: 1995

The Ōwairaka, Statue of a Cloaked Woman by Christine Hellyar is a suffrage memorial to commemorate the women of Mount Albert. It is located in Alice Wylie Reserve, Mount Albert, Auckland. It was initially erected in 1995. After being vandalised beyond repair in May 2022, Hellyar remade and replaced it in September 2024.

== Background ==
=== Inception and Creation ===
Ōwairaka, Statue of a Cloaked Woman, was commissioned by local Mount Albert women in order to appropriately recognise and celebrate the women of the area who have settled, shaped and developed the suburb in the past and present. The sculpture honours all who have contributed to the community, from suffragettes and political figures to the women who made marmalade and date loaves to help raise funds for community facilities in Mount Albert. The women of Mount Albert fundraised for eighteen months between 1994 and 1995 in order to raise enough money to pay Christine Hellyar to create the sculpture. Various methods of raising money occurred, most notably inviting women to contribute $1 for every year that they had lived in Mount Albert, with the remaining balance being settled by the Mount Albert Community Board.

In 1995, Hellyar cast the statue on-site at Alice Wylie Reserve so that the public could witness the sculpture's inception. Hellyar did a live pour where the bronze bubbled over fire and then flowed into its shape. Once the bronze solidified, the sculpture was hoisted into position using a crane. Hellyar informed onlookers that the sculpture was influenced by Wairaka, from whom Ōwairaka was named, Ngāti Awa's ancestress.

== History ==
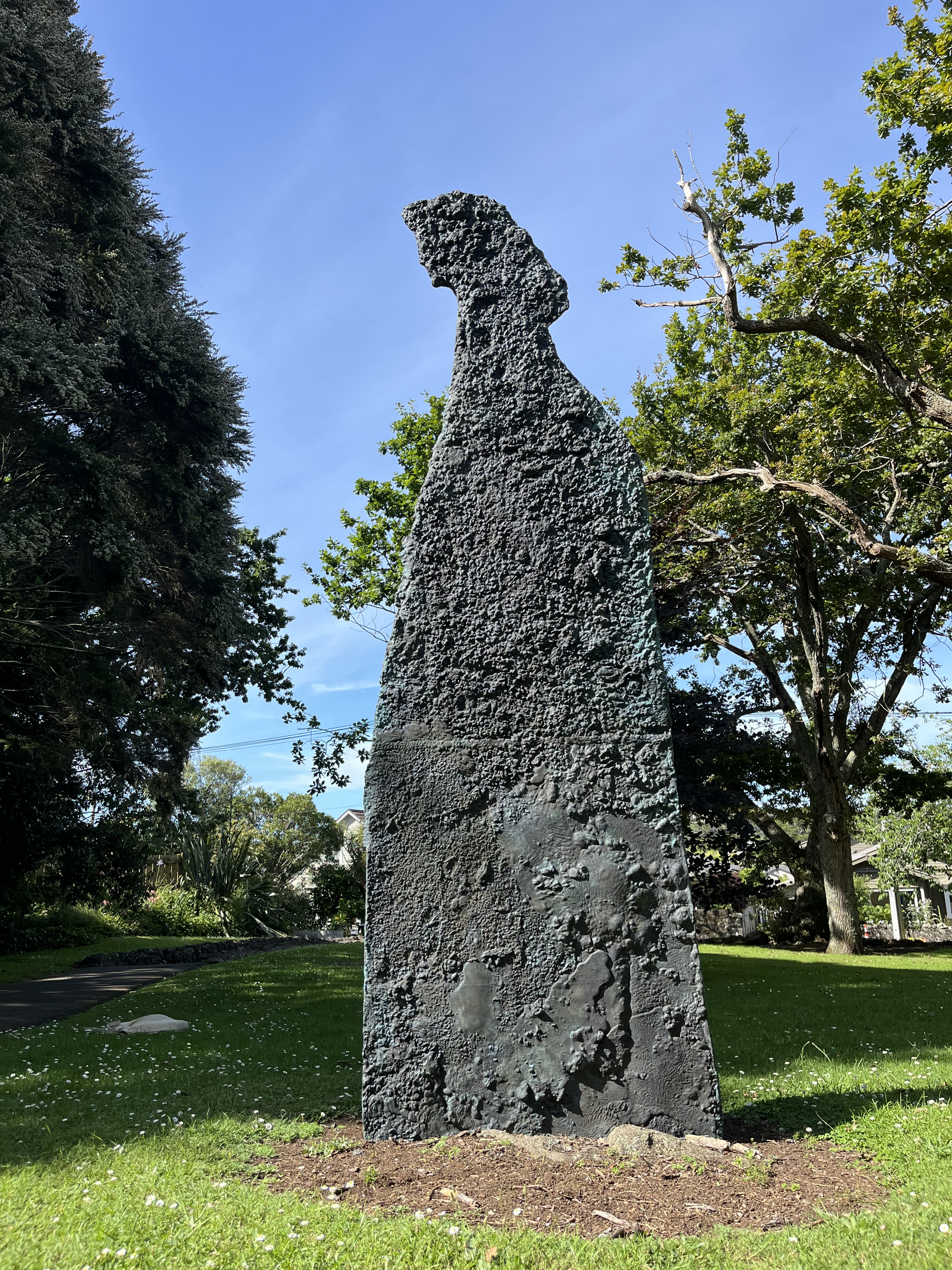
The back of Ōwairaka, Statue of a Cloaked Woman, 2024

The sculpture was originally positioned amongst tall trees in the middle of a rock garden. Because there was no physical path built to reach the sculpture, the only way to get close to it was through a garden, making it largely invisible and relatively inaccessible to get to when walking through the Reserve. The sculpture remained situated in this obscure area of Alice Wylie Reserve until May 2022, when it was significantly vandalised. The vandalism of this sculpture was part of a string of attacks and thefts on sculptures around Auckland, with Statue of a Cloaked Woman suffering the most damage. It was deemed damaged beyond repair.

In order to ensure the possibility of replacing the sculpture, the Auckland Council's Public Art team conducted elaborate scans of the sculpture, enabling Hellyar to replicate it as close to the original as possible. When the sculpture was subsequently remade, Hellyar collaborated with sculptor Richard Mathieson, and the new piece was unveiled a week before Suffrage Day in September 2024. The sculpture was placed along the walkway of the Alice Wylie Reserve this time, allowing passers-by the chance to view the sculpture without difficulty.

== Composition ==
Overall Description	Front Details
The sculpture is crafted from bronze and sits at 3.6 metres tall. The mould was crafted using sand, with a rock positioned at its centre and vegetation pressed into the sides. Before pouring the liquid bronze, the plants were removed, creating a textured surface. While it was closely replicated when being remade, the sculpture received more robust, stronger bronze than the material used in the 1995 creation.	The front of the sculpture is bronze treated with a blue patina. The imprints of the vegetation that had been pressed into the mould left behind a textured surface with visible traces of flora in the sculpture.
Rear Details	Plaque
The back of the sculpture is bronze treated with a black patina. The textured finish on this side is the result of sand and scoria being moulded into the sculpture. The traces of vegetation and scoria are representative of the geographical and ecological features of Mount Albert.	The plaque embedded in the walkway, adjacent to the sculpture reads: Christine Hellyar Ōwairaka 1994 2024 He rauwhero He whakanui tēnei tārai i nga mahi a ngā wāhine i mahi rā hel painga mō te hapori He Kohinga Mahi Toi nā Te Kaunihera o Tāmaki Makaurau Bronze This sculpture is a tribute to the women of this community Auckland Council Art Collection

== Gallery ==
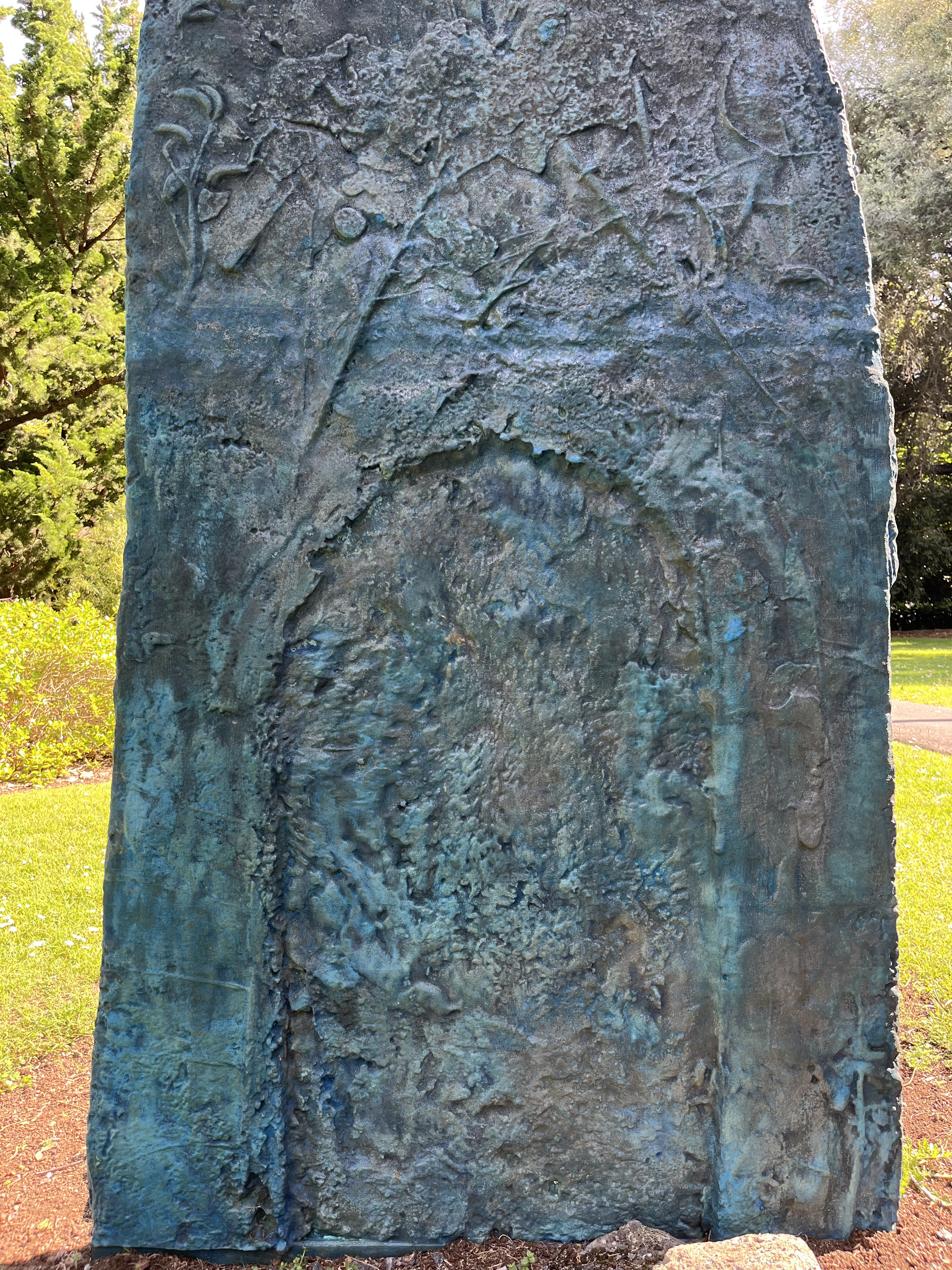
Detail of the front of Ōwairaka, Statue of a Cloaked Woman, 2024

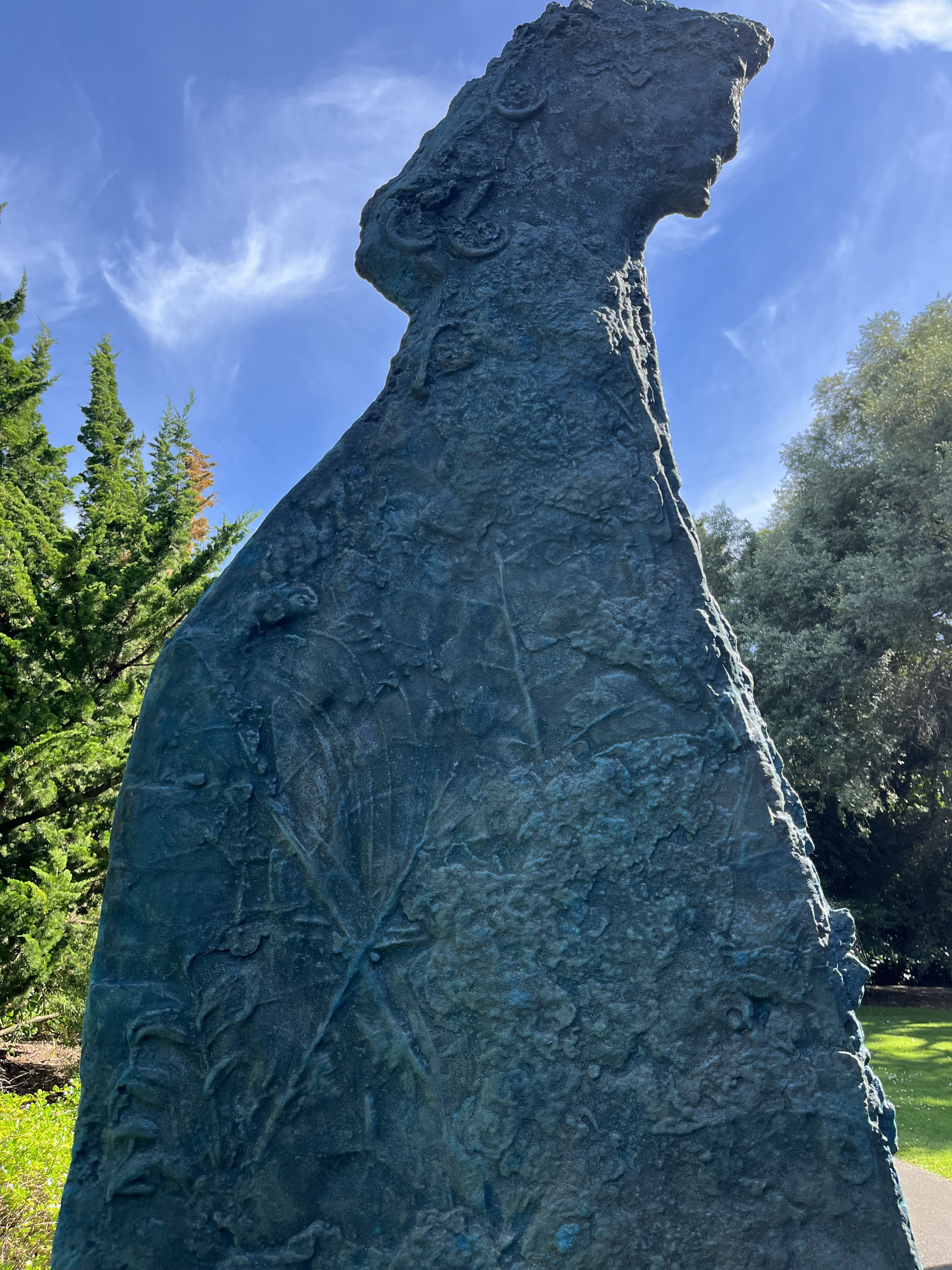
Close-up of Ōwairaka, Statue of a Cloaked Woman, 2024

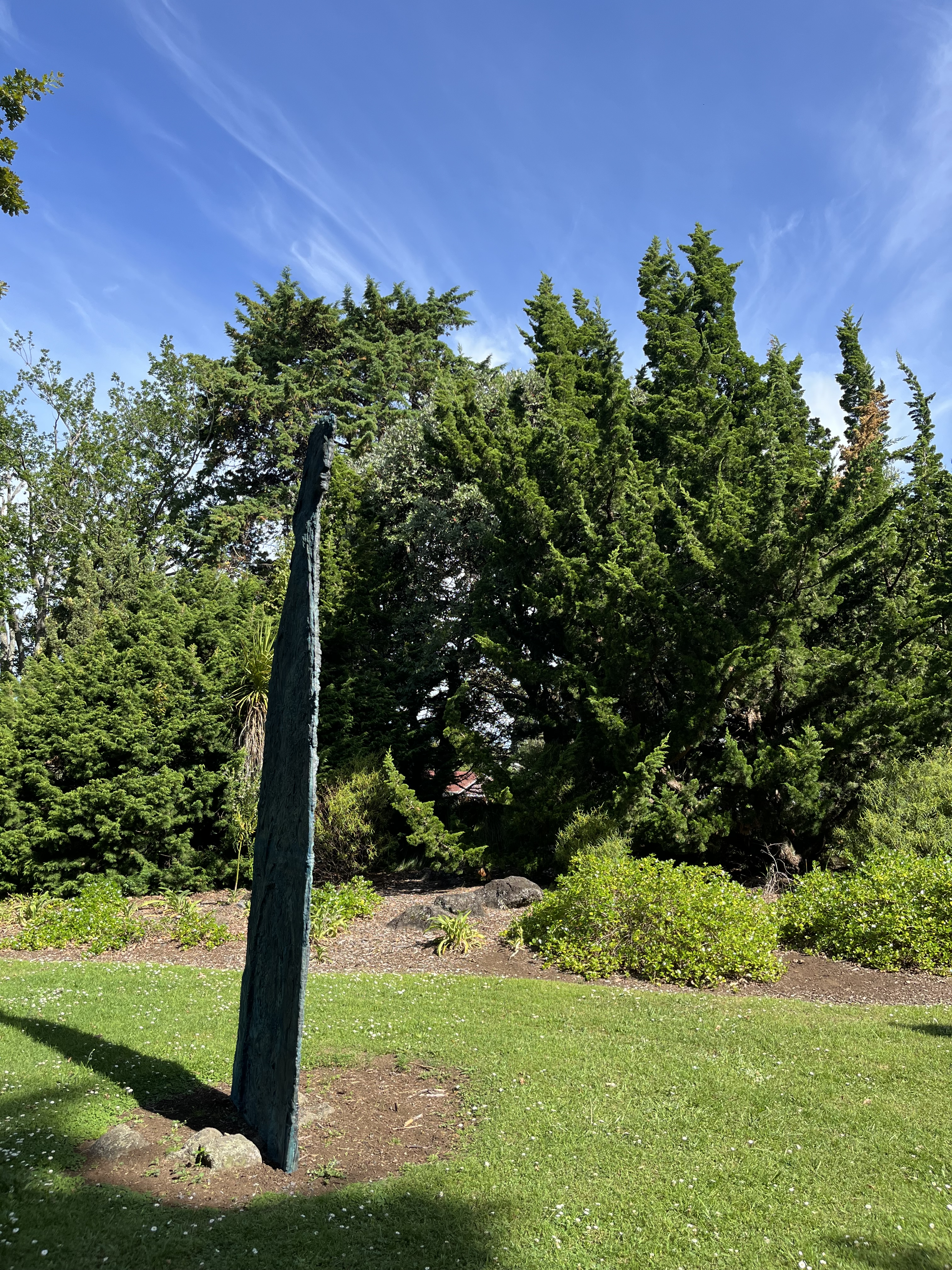
Side-on view of Ōwairaka, Statue of a Cloaked Woman, 2024

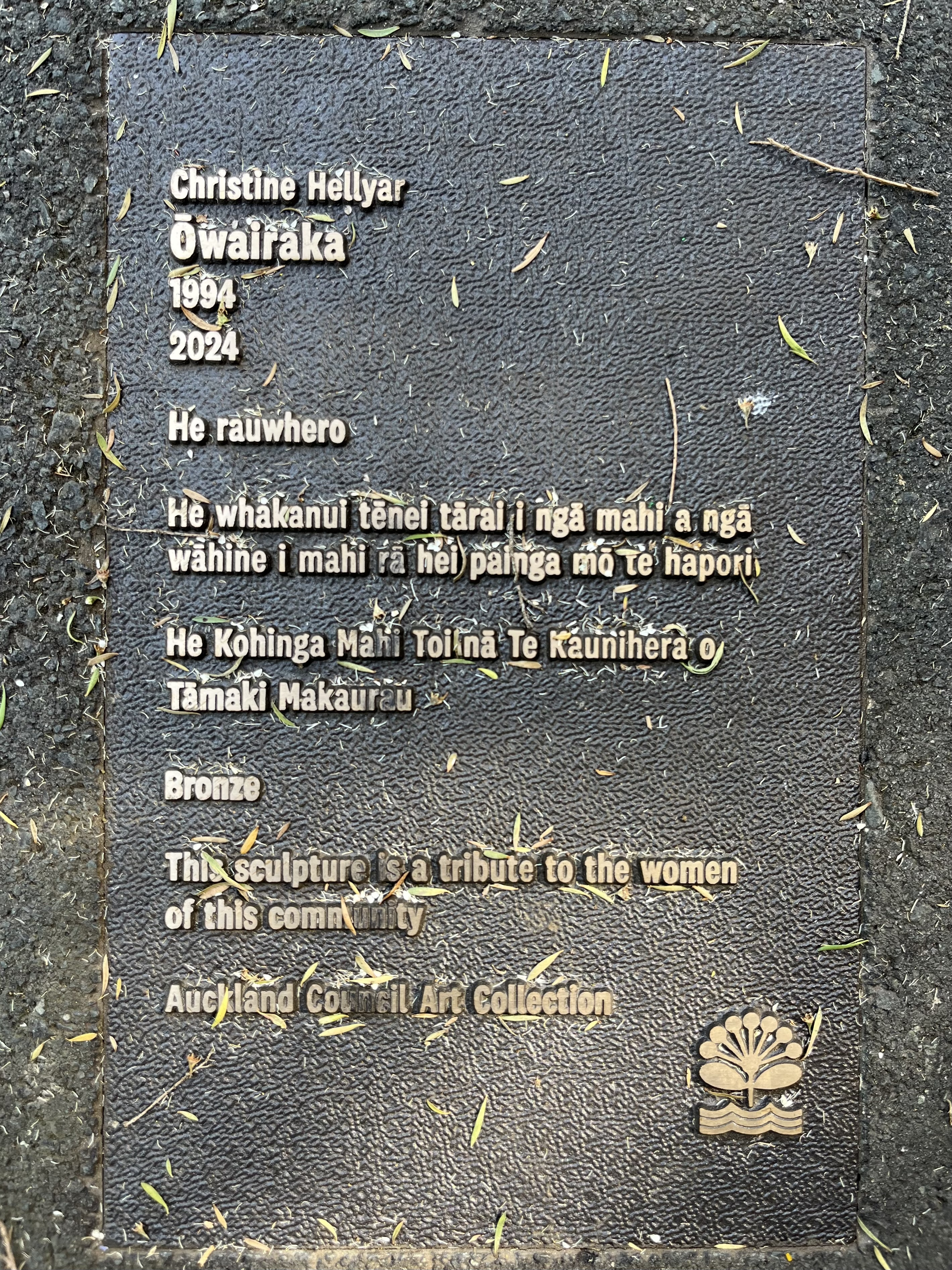
Plaque describing Ōwairaka, Statue of a Cloaked Woman, 2024

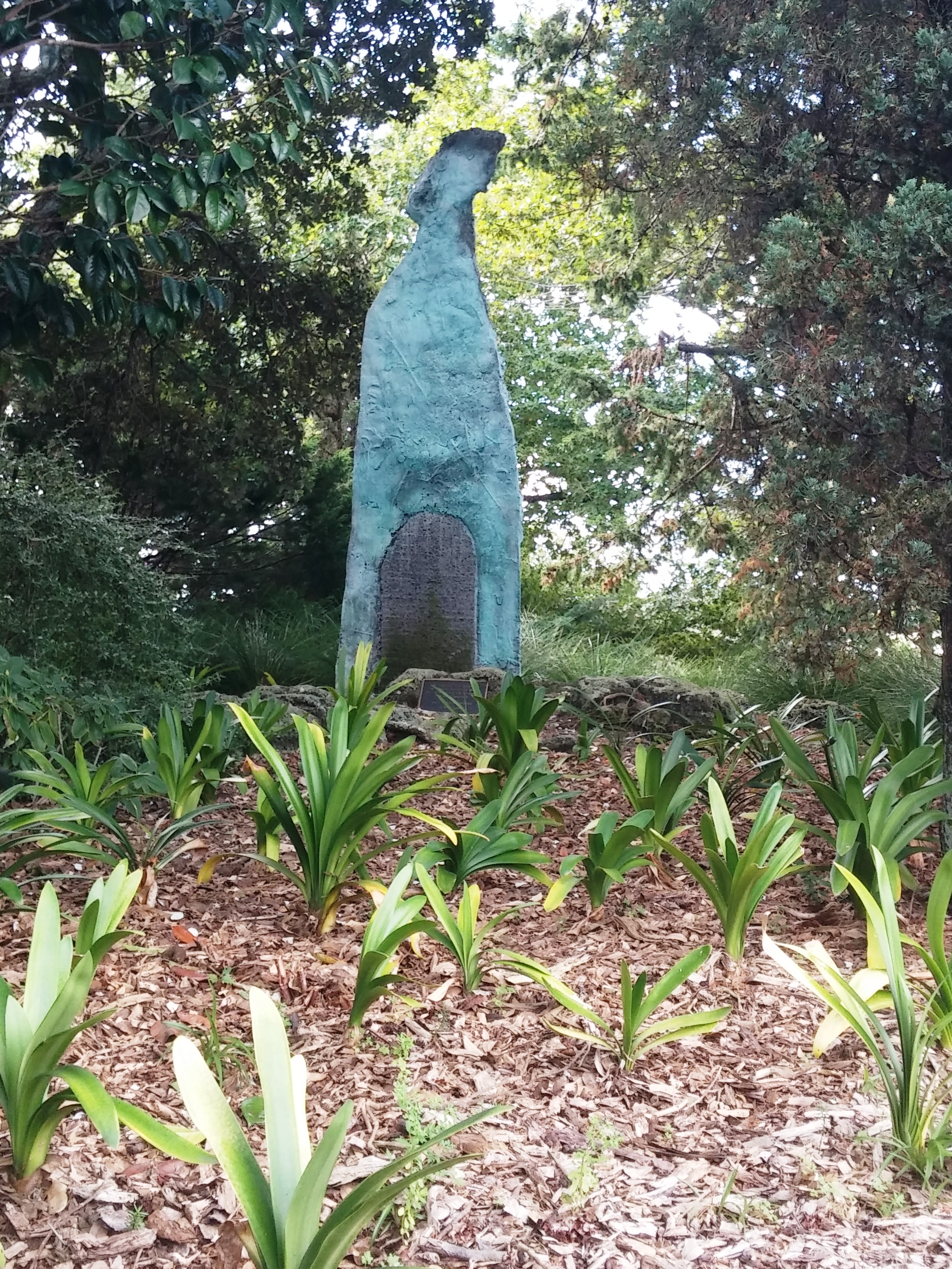
Statue in 2018, prior to vandalism and replacement
