= Jowsey =

Jowsey is a surname. Notable people with the surname include:

- David Jowsey (fl. 1987), Australian film producer
- Harry Jowsey (born 1997), Australian television personality
- Susan Jowsey (born 1962), New Zealand artist
