= Annie Elizabeth Davis =

New Zealand photographer

- Born: 1870
- Died: April 20, 1943 (aged 72–73); Auckland, New Zealand
- Style: Photography

Annie Elizabeth Davis (1870–1943) was a New Zealand photographer.

== Biography ==
Annie Elizabeth Davis was born in 1870. Davis worked in a photography studio run by Alfred Martin as a mounter and finisher. She also worked for Wrigglesworth and Binns photography studio of Wellington.

In 1899, Davis and Emily Collis opened their own photography studio, The Ridgway Studio, in Whanganui. They displayed their photographs in the front of the studio, and were particularly well known for their portraits of children. They sold the studio in 1901 shortly before Collis got married. Following this, Davis moved to Auckland.

Several of Davis' photographs of Edith Collier are part of the collection of the Sarjeant Gallery, including images of Collier as a child with Ethel, Davis' sister. In 1911 and 1912, several of her photographs were published in Auckland Weekly News. There is also a set of archive files for Davis at the Te Aka Matua Research Library, Te Papa Tongarewa.

Davis died on 20 April 1943 in Auckland, New Zealand.
