= Lauren Lysaght =

New Zealand multidisciplinary artist

Lauren Joan Lysaght (born 1949) is a New Zealand multidisciplinary artist. Her works are held in the collection of the Auckland Art Gallery Toi o Tāmaki, the Museum of New Zealand Te Papa Tongarewa, and the Sarjeant Gallery. She has exhibited widely in New Zealand since the early 1980s.

== Early life ==
Lysaght was born in Hamilton in 1949. Lysaght grew up in Tauranga, the daughter of an Irish butcher father and an Italian mother. Lysaght credits an art teacher she met at Tauranga Girls' College, Claudia Jarman, with encouraging her passion to become an artist. At age 15 she was committed to the secure psychiatric institution Oakley Hospital, as she was considered not in 'full control'.

== Career ==
In 1987 Lysaght started working as a full-time artist, and had her first solo exhibition at the Dowse Art Museum in Lower Hutt called Out of the Woodwork, an installation of found furniture customised by painting on it, titled to also mark her coming out as a lesbian.

Lysaght has been described as one of New Zealand's foremost social conscience artists, her works being often concerned with issues such as disability, poverty and mental illness. She has worked with mental health patients, elderly people in nursing homes, council housing tenants, and between 1984 and 1986 Lysaght helped set up an art programme at Arohata Women's Prison.

In 2016 Lysaght moved to Whanganui with her partner.

Notable solo exhibitions:

- Kutarere Sunrise (2018) at Whakatāne Museum, Whakatāne.
- The Jar Room (2017) at Sarjeant on the Quay, Whanganui.
- My Casa is Your Casa (2010) at Tauranga Art Gallery.
- The Nita Gini Collection (2010) at City Gallery Wellington and the Gus Fisher Gallery in Auckland. This exhibition was an homage to her Italian grandmother and featured copies of well-known Crown Lynn works rendered in unconventional materials.
- Outcomes (2008) at Aigantighe Gallery, Timaru. This work was created in response to the culture of 'beneficiary bashing' Lysaght saw in New Zealand culture.
- Chateau Cardboard (2007) at Mary Newton Gallery, Wellington.
- Citizen Cane No 52025 (2002) at the Sarjeant Gallery, the culmination of Lysaght's six month residency at Tylee Cottage in Whanganui. This exhibition responded to the experience of disability in an able-bodied world. The title of the show was drawn from the cane basket works made by Lysaght, and her disability parking permit number, 52025.
- Hacker (2000) at Salamander Gallery, Christchurch, a tribute to computer hackers.
- Four Legs Good (2000) at the Hawke's Bay Museum, Napier, New Zealand.
- Hidden Agender (1995) at Rotorua Museum of Art and History Te Whare Taonga o Te Arawa.
- Out of the Woodwork (1987) at the Dowse Art Museum, Lower Hutt.

Notable group exhibitions:

- Glasgow Art Fair (2005) in Glasgow.
- Auckland Triennial (2004) at Auckland City Gallery. Lysaght presented an installation titled Trifecta, a commentary on fantasy and gambling.
- Sustainability The Land Remains (1999) at the Sarjeant Gallery, Whanganui. Other artists included Joanna Paul, Huhana Smith, Bronwynne Cornish, Grant Corbishley, Frances Jill Studd, Cushla Donaldson, and Andrew Drummond.

Awards and residencies:

- Residency at the Arts Centre, Christchurch (2000).
- Artist-in-residence at Tylee Cottage, Whanganui (2001).
- Gold Medal Award Winner of the Art Addiction Annual Exhibition in Venice, Italy, for her work Day In Day Out.
- Recipient of a Queen Elizabeth II Arts Council Grant.
- Residency at Unitec, the site of the former hospital in which she was held as a teenager (2003). Lysaght saw this residency as a high-point in her career, as she was able to take 'revenge' for her experiences when committed to Oakley Hospital at age 15 through exploring art-making at the same site.
