= Roberta Thornley =

New Zealand photographer

- Born: 1985 (age 40–41); Auckland
- Education: Elam School of Fine Arts
- Known for: photography
- Awards: Marti Friedlander Photographic Award 2017

Roberta Thornley (born 1985) is a New Zealand photographer. Her work is in the permanent collections of Christchurch Art Gallery and the Sarjeant Gallery.

== Biography ==
Thornley is a graduate of the Elam School of Fine Arts at the University of Auckland. In 2014 she received a residency at Tylee Cottage with the Sarjeant Gallery, and spent five months there the following year. Her work is included in collections such as the Real Art Roadshow, Christchurch Art Gallery Te Puna O Waiwhetu and the Sarjeant Gallery.

== Awards ==
- 2017: Marti Friedlander Photographic Award
- 2011: Auckland Festival of Photography Annual Commission

== Exhibitions ==
- A Serious Girl, Sarjeant Gallery Te Whare o Rehua, Whanganui, 27 May 2017 – 20 August 2017
- A Serious Girl, Tim Melville Gallery, Auckland, 28 August 2017 – 30 September 2017
