= Joanna Langford =

New Zealand artist (born 1978)

Joanna Langford (born 1978) is a New Zealand artist, born in Gisborne, New Zealand.

Langford gained a Master of Fine Arts in Painting at the University of Canterbury in 2004.

== Career ==
Langford's sculptural works are made from found and recycled materials, inspired by romanticised landscapes and mythical possibilities. Many of her works feature references to architectural structures seen in urban built environments.

Notable exhibitions:

- down from the nightlands, Sarjeant Gallery, Whanganui, 2007–2008. This exhibition was the result of Langford's tenure as Tylee Cottage artist-in-residence.
- Brave Days, Enjoy Public Art Gallery, Wellington, 2008.
- The Beautiful and the Damned, Wellington City Gallery, 2008.
- The Landless, Dunedin Public Art Gallery, 2009.
- The Whisper Lands, Marine Events Centre, Auckland, 2009. This large sculptural installation was exhibited as part of the 2009 Auckland Art Fair.
- Up from the plainlands, Christchurch Art Gallery, 2009–2011. This work was commissioned by the gallery.
- Beyond Nowhere, Pataka Art + Museum, Porirua, 2011. This survey of Langford's works presented ten installations.
- Honey in the Rock: Joanna Langford, Hocken Collections, Dunedin, 2011. A series of installations built from found objects and recycled materials.

== Awards and residencies ==
- In 2007 Langford participated in the Tylee Cottage Residency at the Sarjeant Gallery in Whanganui.
- Langford was the recipient of the 2006 Olivia Spencer Bower Award.
- In 2010 Langford was the Frances Hodgkins Fellow, University of Otago.
