= Emily May Carlisle =

New Zealand artist and photographer

- Born: Emily May Collis; 1870
- Died: August 23, 1903 (aged 32–33); Whanganui, New Zealand
- Known for: photography, drawing

Emily May Carlisle (née Collis) was a New Zealand photographer and artist.

== Biography ==
Emily May Collis was born in 1870 to William Collis, photographer, and his wife, Mary.

Her brother William Andrew Collis was also a photographer and she was a colourist for him, notably in 1891 when she coloured his collection of Christmas cards.

Sometime later, Collis and Annie Elizabeth Davis worked together at Wrigglesworth and Binns photography studio of Wellington. In 1899, Collis and Davis opened their own photography studio, The Ridgway Studio, in Whanganui. They displayed their photographs in the front of the studio, and were particularly well known for their portraits of children. They sold the studio in 1901.

Collis also drew, and published several caricatures and sketches in the Observer. Her drawings for the Observer were described as "clever and humourous [sic] black and white work." She was also described as an artist of "considerable talent."

On 30 September 1901, Collis married Francis Alexander Shaw Carlisle, and they had a daughter in 1902.

Carlisle died on 23 August 1903, possibly due to complications from childbirth.
