= Toroa (sculpture) =

Sculpture in Dunedin, New Zealand

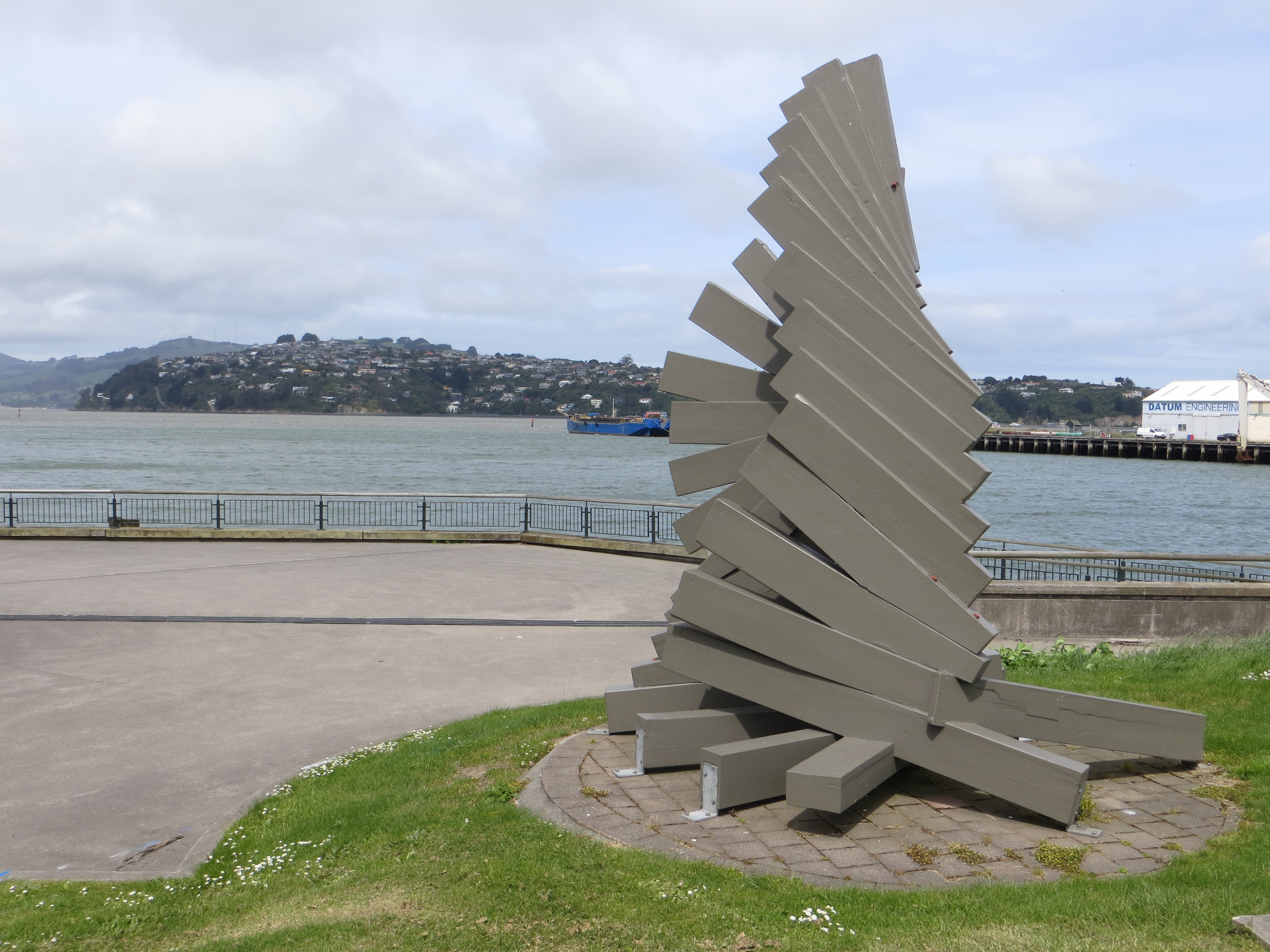
- Toroa (1989) by Peter Nicholls
- Artist: Peter Nicholls
- Year: 1989
- Medium: timber
- Subject: Northern royal albatross
- Dimensions: 4 m (13 ft)
- Location: Dunedin, New Zealand
- 45.879386°S 170.506443°E

Toroa is a 1989 sculpture by New Zealand artist Peter Nicholls. It is located on the foreshore of Otago Harbour in the city of Dunedin, New Zealand. It is part of the collection of Dunedin Public Art Gallery.

The statue was originally sited in the grounds of Dunedin Public Art Gallery at the Sargood Centre at Logan Park in Dunedin North. When the gallery was moved to new premises in The Octagon, the statue remained in its original site before being moved to its current location in 1998 as part of the redevelopment of the harbour foreshore.

The work stands 4 metres (13 ft) in height, and is created from large cuts of wood arrayed so as to represent the wings of an albatross (toroa is the Māori word for albatross). Dunedin's Otago Peninsula, visible from the sculpture's site, is the location of the only breeding colony of royal albatross on an inhabited mainland. Academic Peter Leech has commented that Toroa captures "the paradox of flight in that winged ponderousness and spine muscularity of the bird heaving its half ton-ness off the ground in a ruffle of massive feathers."

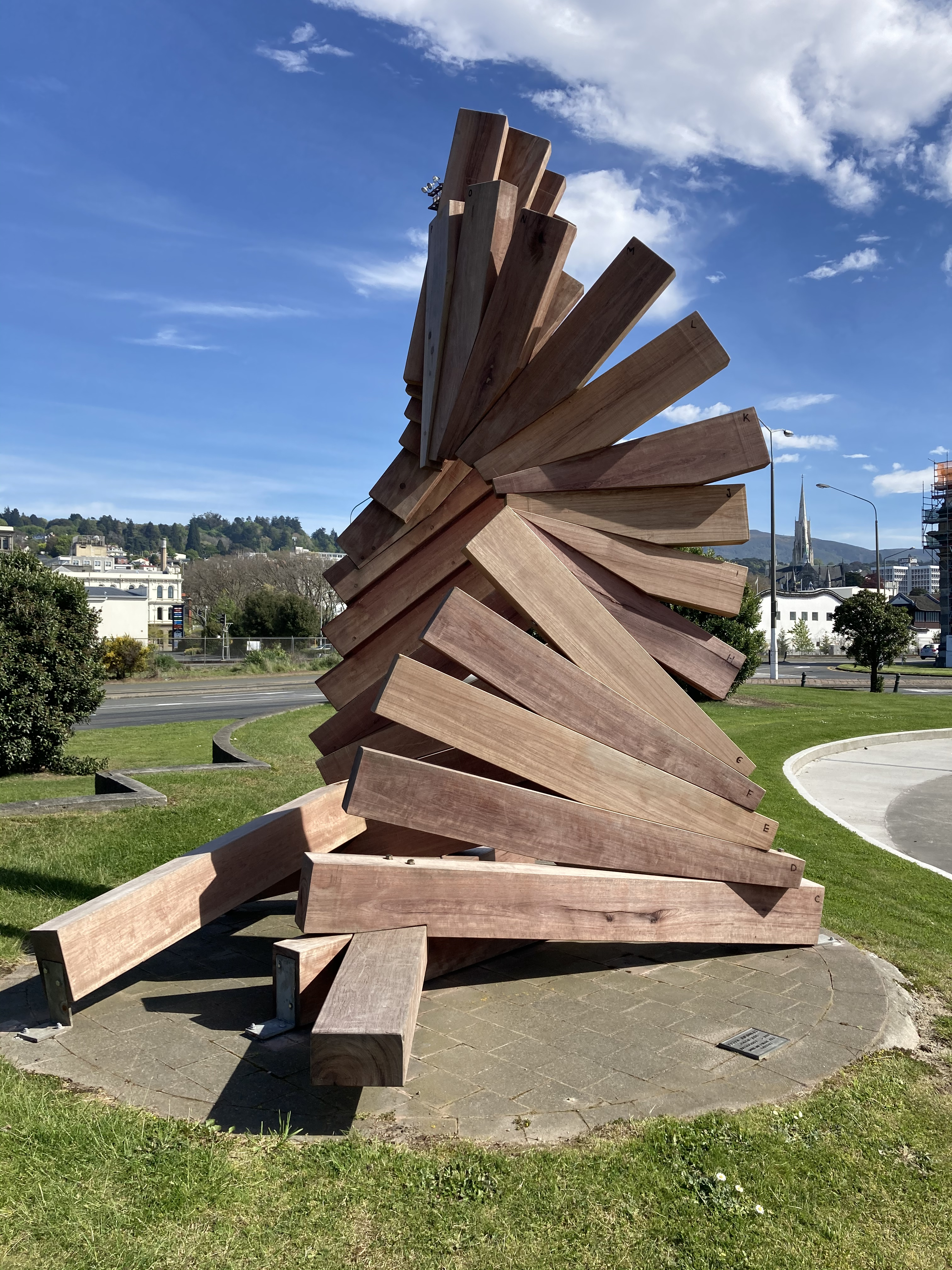
Toroa in October 2020, after the original macrocarpa was replaced with purpleheart.

Toroa was originally created from macrocarpa timber, which was prone to weathering, and was reconstructed in South American purpleheart hardwood in 2020.
