= Susan Jowsey =

New Zealand multimedia artist and a university lecturer (born 1962)

Susan Elizabeth Jowsey (born 1962) is a New Zealand multimedia artist and a university lecturer. She works with perfumery, found materials, 3D objects, installation, moving image and photography.

In 1996, Jowsey won the Visa Gold Art Award. In 2001, she was a joint holder of the Tylee Cottage Residency at the Sarjeant Gallery in Whanganui, in the North Island of New Zealand. In 2009, Jowsey, her husband Marcus Williams, and their two children (aged 12 and 10 at the time) won the Wallace Art Awards' paramount award with a photographic piece they had collaborated on under the name "F4 Collective". As part of the prize, the family spent six months at the International Studio and Curatorial Programme in New York. It was the first time in the Wallace Art Awards' history that a photographic piece had won the Paramount Award, and also the first time a collective had won.

In 2014 the F4 Collective produced a work for the Hastings City Art Gallery in Hastings.

== Research and publications ==
- The solar familiar : fact and fiction in photography and visual anthropology (in The International Journal of the Arts in Society, Volume 2, Number 1, 2007 http://www.arts-journal.com, ISSN 1833-1866); co-authored with Marcus Williams
- Corrective measures: Actual and virtual interactive narrative (unpublished Unitec Research Committee Research Report, 2011)
- Constructing worlds F4: An artist collective considered (in The International Journal of the Arts in Society Volume 6, Issue 3, 2011, http://www.arts-journal.com, ISSN 1833-1866)
- The Moveable Feast Collective Teach Design (Unitec ePress, 2014)
