= Bill Milbank =

New Zealand gallery director (1948–2023)

Bill Milbank QSO
- Born: William Handley Milbank; 25 October 1948; Raetihi, New Zealand
- Died: 4 November 2023 (aged 75); Whanganui, New Zealand
- Education: Ruapehu College
- Occupations: Art curator; gallery director
- Employer: Sarjeant Gallery

William Handley Milbank QSO (25 October 1948 – 4 November 2023) was a New Zealand art curator and gallery director. He served as the director of the Sarjeant Gallery in Whanganui for 27 years, between 1978 and 2006.

== Early life and education ==
William Handley Milbank was born in Raetihi, New Zealand, on 25 October 1948, the son of Bill and Hazel Milbank. He was a direct descendant of John Handley, chairman of the first Whanganui Town Board. He attended Ruapehu College in Ohakune where he was taught by art teacher Stan Frost. He initially worked on the family farm before moving to Whanganui to find work as a draughtsman, starting out as a builder's labourer until he secured a position as a draughtsman for the town planning department of the then Wanganui City Council, where he remained for seven years.

== Sarjeant Gallery ==
Milbank started work at the Sarjeant Gallery in 1975 as an exhibition technician, working for the Sarjeant's first Director, Gordon H. Brown. After Brown's resignation in 1977, Milbank was acting director and then applied for the position of director. He was the director of the Sarjeant Gallery from 1978 to 2006. In that time he consolidated the relationship that saw the Sarjeant Gallery become the custodians of the Edith Collier Trust collection. In 1986, Milbank helped establish the Sarjeant Gallery's Tylee Cottage Residency programme. He helped tour a number of exhibitions nationally and internationally, including Seven Maori Artists, which toured Australia in 1980, and Distance Looks Our Way, which went to Spain in 1992. He is noted for his support of contemporary Māori art, he acquired significant holdings of contemporary photography for the gallery's collection, and he oversaw a series of significant installations in the gallery's central dome area, including a 1988 installation by sculptor Andrew Drummond.

In 2022, a special exhibition was held at the Sarjeant Gallery to acknowledge strengths in the Sarjeant collection that were developed under Milbank's leadership.

== Art sector leadership ==
Milbank became chairman of the New Zealand Art Gallery Directors' Guild in 1978. In 1979 he became the vice-president of the Art Galleries and Museum Association, later becoming its chairman.

From 1996, he was on the advisory committee for the Quay School of the Arts' Fine Arts Degree. He was an appointee to the government's Cultural Conservation Advisory Council and was on the advisory committee for the planning of the newly formed national museum, Te Papa, which opened in 1998.

After his time at the Sarjeant Gallery, at the beginning of 2007 Milbank established his own consultancy and private gallery in Whanganui, the W.H. Milbank Gallery. In February 2011, having moved the gallery from its former home on Taupo Quay, he reopened it in a former Druid's Hall on Bell Street.

Milbank died on 4 November 2023.

== Honours ==
In the 2005 Queen's Birthday Honours, Milbank was appointed a Companion of the Queen's Service Order for community service.
