= Laurence Aberhart =

New Zealand photographer (born 1949)

Laurence Geoffrey Aberhart (born 1949) is a New Zealand photographer, born in Nelson, New Zealand.

== Biography ==
Aberhart was born in Nelson in 1949, and was educated at Nelson College from 1963 to 1966. He moved to Lyttelton in the late 1960s, before finally moving to Russell where he still lives and works today. Aberhart travels often and has produced many collections of photographs taken around the world. Although he photographs numerous subjects, Aberhart is best known for his photography of buildings from around the world. His subject matter includes Masonic lodges, war memorials, houses and the occasional landscape. However, when he was typecast as a building photographer, Aberhart took a series of human portraits to debunk the stereotype.

Aberhart trained to become a primary teacher, and in 1967 he first became interested in photography when he took art as an option during his training. His interest was also developed by reading the photographic books on display at the local library and having access to a darkroom. Aberhart taught himself photography. After finishing his teaching course, he was posted in Northland. This was his only posting as a teacher and soon after he took up photography seriously. Aberhart has three children, who were the subject of a series of photographs in the 1980s, but is unmarried.

== Photographic style and works ==
Aberhart's work is prominent in New Zealand and he is often seen as one of the forefathers of New Zealand's contemporary photographic history. He has been featured in many photographic exhibitions since 1978; his work has been shown in museums across the globe, including Australia, the United States and France. In addition to numerous photographic exhibitions across New Zealand, Aberhart was Artist In Residence at the Tylee Cottage Residency, Wanganui in 1986 and the Dunedin Public Art Gallery in the late 1990s.

Aberhart bought an old camera to begin photographing. However, soon after he began using it in the late 1960s, the paper used to print the negatives on went out of production as well. Aberhart has been known to use platinum prints when developing photographs, but also uses other paper such as silver gelatine prints. Owing to this unusual photographic process, each print would take in excess of eight hours to fully develop in Aberhart's darkroom. In addition, the time between Aberhart taking the photo and actually developing it was in some instances large; he would often develop photographs years later. Indeed, in one instance, he waited from 1978 until the early 2000s to develop one photograph.

Aberhart was fairly limited in his subject matter, sticking mainly to Māori carvings, buildings, museology and memorials. However, feeling pressed by others' perception that he was typecast, he released a series of photographs of his children in the 1980s. Perhaps his most expensive and memorable prints are the "Prisoner's Dream" series of five photographs. At the centre of the series is Mount Taranaki. This picture is special due to its long exposure time of over five hours. This was caused by Aberhart's absence to take a 'nap', but he didn't awaken until a while later. The whole photograph was lit by moonlight and was nearly thrown out as rubbish by Aberhart when he realised how long it had been exposed for. This is one of his most expensive photographs.
