= Joan Grehan =

New Zealand artist (1920–2007)

Joan Grehan (5 January 1920 – 25 November 2007) was a New Zealand artist.

Grehan was born Joan Greenwood Brodie in 1920 in Whanganui. Her parents were Archibald Douglas Brodie and Marjorie Gascoyne Greenwood, who married in 1916. Grehan attended Whanganui Girls' College and studied fine art at the University of Canterbury, then later at the Camberwell College of Arts in London. While at Canterbury she studied under noted Christchurch artists Cecil F. Kelly and Archibald Nicholl. She lived and worked overseas for 30 years in Australia, Cyprus, Uganda, Lebanon, Italy and France before returning to New Zealand in 1983.

Grehan moved to Australia with her first husband Don Oldfield, and then to other countries with her second husband Michel Grehan, a water engineer in the British colonial service and later in the United Nations Food and Agricultural Organisation.

From 1954 to 1958, Grehan worked as a portrait painter in Cyprus during the British occupation there, and from 1958 to 1963 she lived in Uganda. In 1963 Grehan moved to Lebanon for two years, before spending ten years (1965 to 1975) in Rome. Grehan studied ceramics under Alfredo Galicamo, specialising in modelling mythical beasts and figures. In 1975 she set up a ceramics studio near Beaulieu-sur-Dordogne where she lived until 1983, when she moved to the Bay of Islands.

Grehan moved to Whanganui in 1996 after the death of her second husband Michel. Grehan took on the role of vice-president of the Whanganui Art Society, and was a mentor to young artists.

Much of Grehan's art was about women, and often featured symbols linked to nature, wisdom and sensuality.

Grehan died suddenly from a stroke in 2007, at age 87. In 2014, the Joan Grehan Estate gifted 462 of her works to the Sarjeant collection. She is regarded as one of the most significant Whanganui artists since Edith Collier.

Grehan's works are held in the collections of Sarjeant Gallery, Auckland Art Gallery Toi o Tāmaki, and Museum of New Zealand Te Papa Tongarewa.
