= Tylee Cottage Residency =

Artist-in-residence programme at Tylee Cottage, Whanganui

The Tylee Cottage Residency is an artist-in-residence programme facilitated by the Sarjeant Gallery in Whanganui, New Zealand. The scheme began in 1986 as a partnership between the Sarjeant Gallery, the Wanganui District Council and the QEII Arts Council of New Zealand (now known as Creative New Zealand). It was established by gallery director, Bill Milbank, QEII Arts Council adviser, John McCormack, and inaugural artist, Laurence Aberhart. It is currently managed by the Sarjeant Gallery and funded by the Whanganui District Council. Each year, the selected artist works full-time on their work for 2–12 months and resides in Tylee Cottage. Tylee Cottage was built in 1853 and is one of Whanganui's oldest homes.

== List of artists-in-residence ==
Since the Tylee Cottage Residency was established in 1986, the artists-in-residence have been:

- 1986 Laurence Aberhart
- 1987 Andrew Drummond
- 1988 Mervyn Williams
- 1989 Anne Noble
- 1990 Sue Cooke
- 1991 Emare Karaka
- 1992 Dennis Turner
- 1993 Ans Westra
- 1994 Gary Freemantle
- 1995–96 Peter Ireland
- 1996 John Beard
- 1997 Andrew Smith
- 1997–98 George Krause
- 1998 Julian Hooper
- 1999 Bronwynne Cornish and Victor Meertens
- 2000 Jeff Thomson, Sarah Buist and Sonia van Kerkhoff
- 2000–01 Marcus Williams and Susan Jowsey
- 2001–02 Lauren Lysaght
- 2002 Alastair Galbraith and Jean Zuber
- 2002–03 Gregor Kregar
- 2003–04 Andrea du Chatenier
- 2004 Johanna Pegler
- 2005 Christine Hellyar and Paul Johns
- 2005–06 Ben Cauchi
- 2006–07 Matt Couper
- 2007 Mark Braunias and Joanna Langford
- 2007–08 Regan Gentry
- 2008 James Robinson
- 2009 Andrew Ross and Miranda Parkes
- 2009–10 Kay Walsh
- 2010 Emily Valentine Bullock
- 2010–11 Liyen Chong
- 2011 John Roy and Glenn Burrell
- 2011–12 Charles Butcher and Cobi Cockburn
- 2012 Adrian Jackman and Alexis Neal
- 2012–13 Ann Shelton
- 2014 Richard Orjis
- 2014–15 Cat Auburn
- 2015 Roberta Thornley and Sam Mitchell
- 2016 Erica van Zon, Wendy Fairclough and Susan Frykberg
- 2017 Peter Trevelyan
- 2017–18 Conor Clark
- 2018 Kate Fitzharris
- 2018-19 Julia Holden
- 2019 Annie Mackenzie and Marie Shannon
- 2019-20 Jae Hoon Lee
- 2020 Laurence Aberhart, Matthew McIntyre-Wilson and Anne Noble
- 2021 Graham Fletcher, Zahra Killeen-Chance and Solomon Mortimer
- 2022 Andrew McLeod and Denis O'Connor
- 2023 Areez Katki and Christopher Ulutupu
- 2024 Jade Townsend and Kirsty Lillico
