= Christine Hellyar =

New Zealand sculptor and installation artist (1947–2026)

- Born: 2 October 1947; New Plymouth, New Zealand
- Died: 5 October 2026 (aged 79); Auckland, New Zealand
- Education: Diploma in Fine Arts (Hons) at the Elam School of Art
- Known for: Sculpture, teaching
- Website: http://www.christinehellyar.com/

Christine Joy Hellyar (2 October 1947 – 5 October 2026) was a New Zealand artist who made sculptures and installations.

== Early life and education ==
Hellyar was born on 2 October 1947 in New Plymouth. She completed a Diploma in Fine Arts (Hons) at the Elam School of Art in 1970, where she primarily focused on sculpture incorporating landscapes and landforms. While at Elam, Hellyar was taught by sculptor Greer Twiss, and made friends with fellow sculptor Molly Macalister.

== Work ==
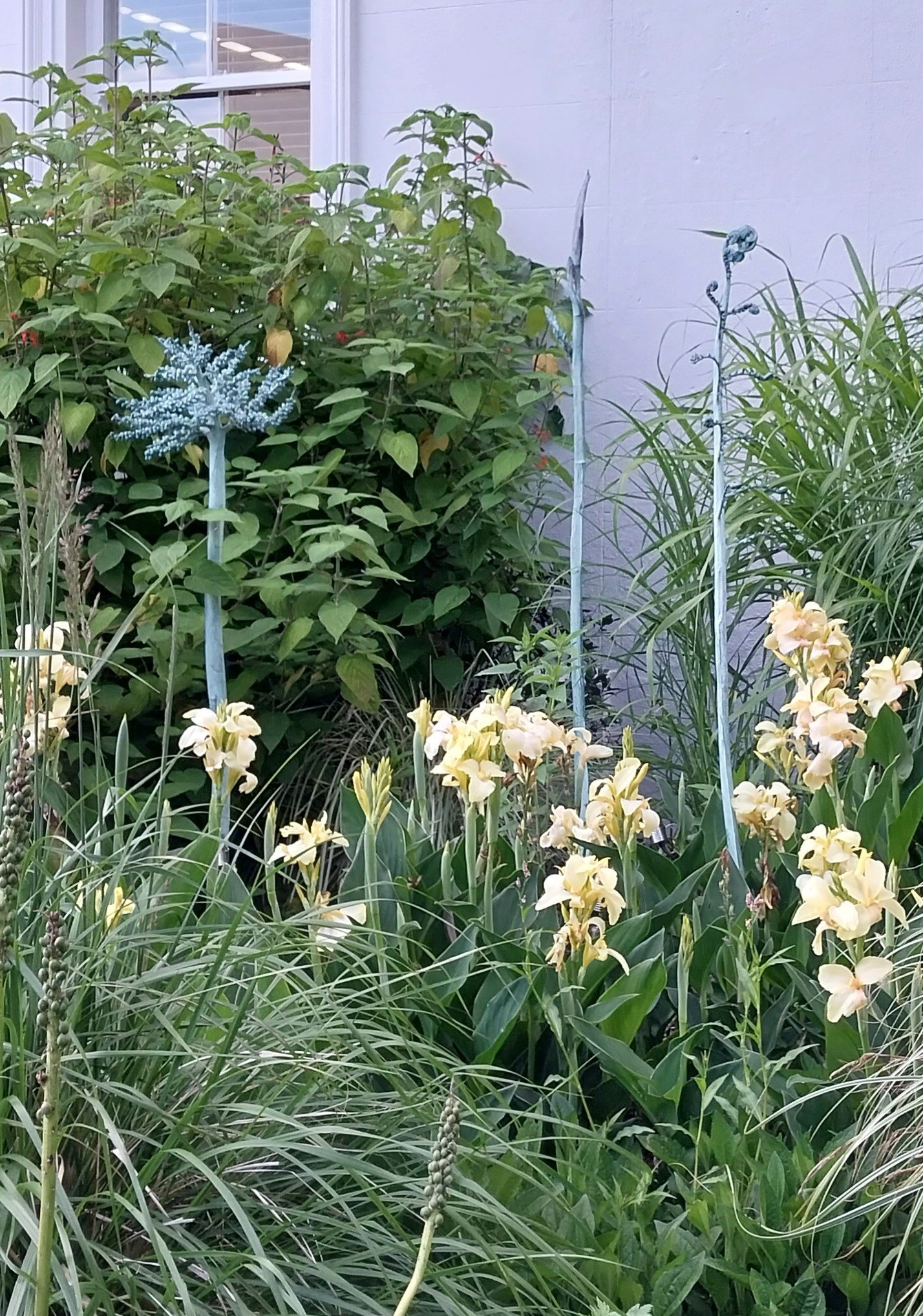
Armlet (1993), found at the University of Auckland

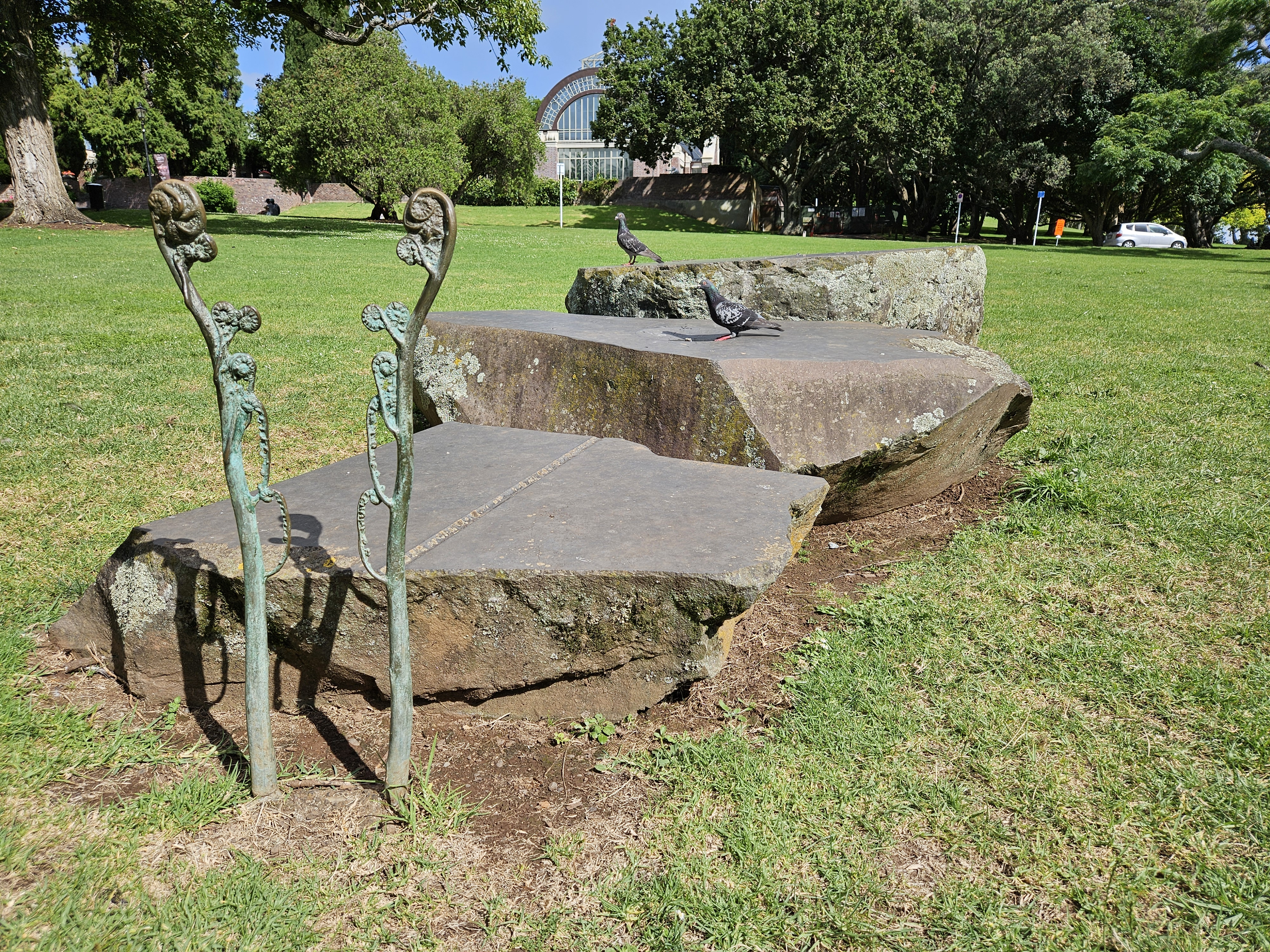
Spring, a 2004 bronze and basalt sculpture in the Auckland Domain

Working in both sculpture and installation, Hellyar's work incorporates a wide range of materials, from found natural items such as grass and stones, to clay, fabric and plaster, to latex, lead and bronze for casting.

Over the years consistent themes in Hellyar's work have included 'her celebration of the environment, her interest in people's interaction with nature, the validation of the domestic and a questioning of traditional gender roles'.

At art school she was encouraged to experiment with rubber latex, then a new material. Hellyar was drawn to the properties of the medium, which allowed for precise replication of texture and details, and used latex to cast objects such as leaves and pine cones.

Country Clothesline (1972), now in the collection of the Govett-Brewster Art Gallery, was one of Hellyar's first major works: It consists of 22 items of clothing dipped in latex and strung along a rope propped up by a pole. There is an element of chance in the work, as there are no instructions as to what order the items should be hung in.

An early exhibition titled Bush Situation (1976) created an environment to surround the viewer with floor pieces and hanging latex casts of vegetation, often stitched together with copper wire. Art historian Priscilla Pitts notes that 'Despite the subtlety of colour and detail in these works, some viewers found the flabby texture and rubbery smell of the latex unpleasant and distinctly unnatural, a less than welcome reminder that this was art, not nature'.

Hellyar moved to Cornwall in the United Kingdom in 1974, later moving to Scotland where she lived from 1977 to 1978, before returning to New Zealand. During this period, she travelled around Europe and visited many museums and galleries. This experience fuelled her interest in the way objects are collected and displayed as 'artefacts'. Subsequently, Hellyar produced a series of works in the early 1980s known as 'Thought Cabinets', in which she drew on the aesthetics of museum displays, laying out bones, food and 'artefacts' she created from a variety of materials in cabinets, cupboards, trays, or directly on the floor of the gallery space. The works examine, among other ideas, the evolution of human thought and intelligence and how the hunter/gather model of ancient societies might apply to modern life.

From the late 1970s Hellyar began to work more with found objects and materials such as clay, which were less expensive and more readily available than latex and metal. Writer Warwick Brown describes a 'memorable 1979 exhibition' where Hellyar showed '70 small, soft sculptures made of stitched, unbleached calico enclosing various natural materials. Antennae ventured out of folds and pockets; furry, feathery things hid in cocoons or webs. Each small work had its own identity, and the spectator seemed surrounded by sheltering, reclusive life, gathered in a laboratory for study or experiment'.

In 1982 Hellyar had an exhibition called Shelter at the Auckland City Art Gallery. For this she filled the room entirely with structures created from muslin, flax and twigs, which were plaited, woven and stitched together. The structures resembled traps, lairs or shelters, and were 'inhabited' by 'small creatures made from substances like fur and claws, shells and bark'. In the same year, Hellyar joined the teaching staff at Elam.

For the 1982 Sydney Biennale Hellyar created a sculptural installation with three components, Meat Cupboard, Dagger Cupboard and Cloak Cupboard. Wooden cabinets with glass fronts were filled with a variety of objects both created and collected by the artist: in a letter she described the contents of Meat Cupboard as "3 realistic bones from decent-sized cuts, 6 abstract foetal forms, 6 collected 'found' nests, 6 of my clay containers with different meat types in each." Each group of items was placed on a separate shelf in its cabinet, with each shelf referencing a different style of art: Realism at the top, then Abstraction, then Found Objects, with the lowest shelf melding all three.

In the mid 1980s Hellyar started working with latex and fabric again, and extended the ‘hunter/gatherer’ theme in works like the ‘Pacific Food Aprons’, in which latex castings of vegetables and meat were sewn onto fabric aprons. Art historian Anne Kirker notes that by the time of her 1985 Aprons exhibition in Wellington, Hellyar was seen as 'one of the country's most thought-provoking and innovative sculptors'. Priscilla Pitts in her 1998 survey of recent New Zealand sculpture notes that a tension between large ideas and subtle manifestations is key to Hellyar's work. Describing a 1986 installation work Being Born, Bearing Fruit and Dying, made up of plant and sea life forms moulded from fine white clay or cast in latex, bronze, lead or iron, Pitts writes:

These forms are grouped to lead the viewer through a schematised narrative not only of the human (and all of nature's) cycle of birth, reproduction and death, but also of the evolution of life, on earth, from the water to the land and finally to the air. The work is large and its themes are grand, yet through the fragmented, low-lying nature of the composition and the use of small, life-size objects, Hellyar ensures it is anything but monumental. This is a characteristic of much of her work, which consistently challenges modernist notions of sculpture as stand-alone, assertive and monolithic.

In the 1990s Hellyar made large, delicate bronze sculptures cast from plants and flowers. She continued to work across sculpture and installation. Among these artworks was Armlet (1993), an outdoor sculpture commissioned for the University of Auckland which features nīkau palm fronds, harakeke, toetoe and silver fern cuttings cast in bronze.

In 2015 Hellyar collaborated with artists Maureen Lander and Jo Torr on an exhibition Tell Tails at the National Library of New Zealand. The exhibition took inspiration from the collections of the Alexander Turnbull Library and Hellyar's contribution Red cloud is made up of dozens of handkerchiefs, neckerchiefs, serviettes and napkins dyed blood red. These materials were all used as items of exchange in early interactions between indigenous people in the Pacific and European explorers; the work was inspired by a work by colonial artist William Ellis in which Tahitian people wear European neckerchiefs. In late 2017 Hellyar presented the exhibition Looking, Seeing, Thinking at Te Uru Waitakere Contemporary Gallery. The installation, made of printed cloth and sculptures, extended Hellyar's interest in the history of the Enlightenment in New Zealand:

The history of the Enlightenment in New Zealand has been a subject of Hellyar’s work since 2002, notably with her exhibition Mrs Cook’s Kete at the Pitt Rivers Museum in Oxford with Maureen Lander. Exploring histories of gender, Hellyar notes that Mrs Cook’s mother was an entrepreneur with a warehouse that provided much of the women’s clothing used for trade in the Pacific. Hellyar is particularly interested in what Europeans brought into the Pacific at that time, and also what they took, including the development of museum collections that map objects into hierarchies through museum processes of naming, sorting and display. Botanical drawing, still in use in museums today, was popular in the 18th century, both for scientific use and amongst enthusiasts, amateur botanists and gardeners.

== Teaching career ==
Hellyar lectured at the Gippsland Institute of Higher Education in 1980 and was senior lecturer at Elam from 1981 to 1996. Anne Kirker noted in her 1986 history of New Zealand women artists that Hellyar had 'earned a reputation as a teacher and is one of the few women to be employed as such at either of the two university art schools in this country'.

== Death ==
Hellyar died in Auckland on 5 October 2026, at the age of 79.

== Major exhibitions and collections ==
Hellyar exhibited consistently in New Zealand and internationally since the 1970s. Her work has been included in major exhibitions including the 1982 Biennale of Sydney, When Art Hits The Headlines (National Art Gallery, Wellington, 1987), NZXI (Auckland City Art Gallery, Art Gallery of New South Wales, Sydney, and Contemporary Art Institute, Brisbane, 1988), Three from NZ (Long Beach Museum of Art, Los Angeles, 1990), Headlands: Thinking Through New Zealand Art (MCA, Sydney, 1992), and Treasures of the Underworld (New Zealand Pavilion at the 1992 Seville Expo, Amsterdam and various New Zealand venues, 1992 to 1994).

In 2005 Hellyar participated in the Tylee Cottage Residency at Whanganui's Sarjeant Gallery and in 2011 the resident botanic artist at the Auckland Botanic Gardens.

Hellyar's work is held in many New Zealand public collections, including the Auckland Art Gallery, Govett-Brewster Art Gallery, Sarjeant Gallery, Museum of New Zealand Te Papa Tongarewa and the Christchurch Art Gallery.

== Artistry ==
Art historian Michael Dunn feels that Hellyar's art is influenced by pop art and Don Driver, and notes that Hellyar's conservationist values present in her works. When discussing Hellyar's works, especially works that incorporate collected objects, Dunn remarks that "Hellyar comes across as an inveterate collector with an eye for ordering her found objects into systems of presentation reminiscent of old museum displays."
