= Adrienne Martyn =

New Zealand photographer (born 1950)

- Born: 1950 (age 75–76); Wellington
- Known for: Photography
- Website: https://www.adriennemartyn.com/

Adrienne Martyn (born 1950 in Wellington) is a New Zealand art photographer. Her work has been collected by numerous art galleries, museums and libraries in New Zealand including the Museum of New Zealand Te Papa Tongarewa, the Dowse Art Museum, the Auckland Art Gallery, the Christchurch Art Gallery and the Hocken Library.

== Early life and education ==
Martyn grew up in Invercargill. In the 1960s she moved to Dunedin and worked in a photographic studio darkroom, before moving to Sydney, where she worked as a freelance photographer and a darkroom technician for the Sydney Morning Herald. Returning to Dunedin in the 1970s, she worked as a photograph processor at the Otago Daily Times, and took a course at the Dunedin School of Art. Her first solo show was held at Bosshard Gallery on Princes Street.

== Photographic style and works ==
Martyn is an acclaimed New Zealand photographer. She is known for her black-and-white portraiture of other New Zealand artists, with her best-known works including portraits of artist Joanna Paul. Her works have been collected by the Museum of New Zealand Te Papa Tongarewa, Auckland Art Gallery, and Dunedin Public Art Gallery. Her portraiture work was the focus of an exhibition by the Dunedin Public Art Gallery in 1988.

In 1999 Martyn was the inaugural recipient of the Samuel Marsden Collegiate School artist in residence programme and was the artist in residence at the Waikato Museum in 2000. In 2007 Martyn held a solo exhibit at the City Gallery Wellington.

Martyn's recent work has shifted to concentrate on studies of interiors of empty buildings, as exemplified by her 2018 series "The Times" and "Bank". In March 2018 she held a solo exhibition at the Invercargill Public Art Gallery entitled "Shift" in which she exhibited photographs taken of the interior of Anderson House.
