= Anton Parsons =

New Zealand sculptor

Invisible City, Lambton Quay, Wellington

Anton Parsons (born 1968, in Palmerston North) is a New Zealand sculptor. His work often contain letters and numbers, sometimes in Braille or Braille-like codes, these are typically arranged along linear of curvilinear surfaces. Some of his early work consisted of meticulously crafted oversized pencils and other writing equipment. Later he produced a series of works involving oversized Braille often in collaboration with the blind poet Dr. Peter Beatson of Palmerston North. The Braille works were followed by a series of works designed to fit in gallery doorways, they consisted of vertical plastic strips similar to a cheap fly screen.

== Education ==
Parsons gained a Bachelor of Fine Arts in Sculpture at the Canterbury School of Fine Art in 1990.

== Awards and grants ==
While at university, Parsons was awarded the Rosemary Muller sculpture award and obtained a number of grants in the following years which allowed him to develop his practice.

- 1990 – Rosemary Muller sculpture award, University of Canterbury
- 1991 – Q.E.2 Arts Council, Creative projects grant
- 1993 – Q.E.2 Arts Council, Professional development grant
- 1996 – Creative New Zealand, New work development grant

== Public commissions ==
Parsons has been commissioned to produce a number of site specific sculptures in New Zealand

- 1992 – Alphabeti, Department of Justice, High Court, Wellington
- 2002 – Gone Fishing, PriceWaterhouse Coopers Building, Auckland
- 2002 – Polyglot, North Shore District Court, Albany
- 2003 – Invisible City, Lambton Quay, Wellington.
- 2004 – Analogue, KPMG Building, Tauranga
- 2007 – Numbers, Coleman Mall, Palmerston North
- 2011 – Passing Time, Wilson Reserve, Christchurch

== Collections ==
- Manawatu Art Gallery, Palmerston North
- Govett Brewster Art Gallery, New Plymouth
- Robert McDougal Art Gallery, Christchurch
- Sargent Art Gallery, Wanganui, New Zealand
- Chartwell Collection, Auckland, New Zealand
- Museum of New Zealand, Te Papa Tongarewa
