= Edith Collier =

New Zealand artist (1885–1964)

Edith Marion Collier
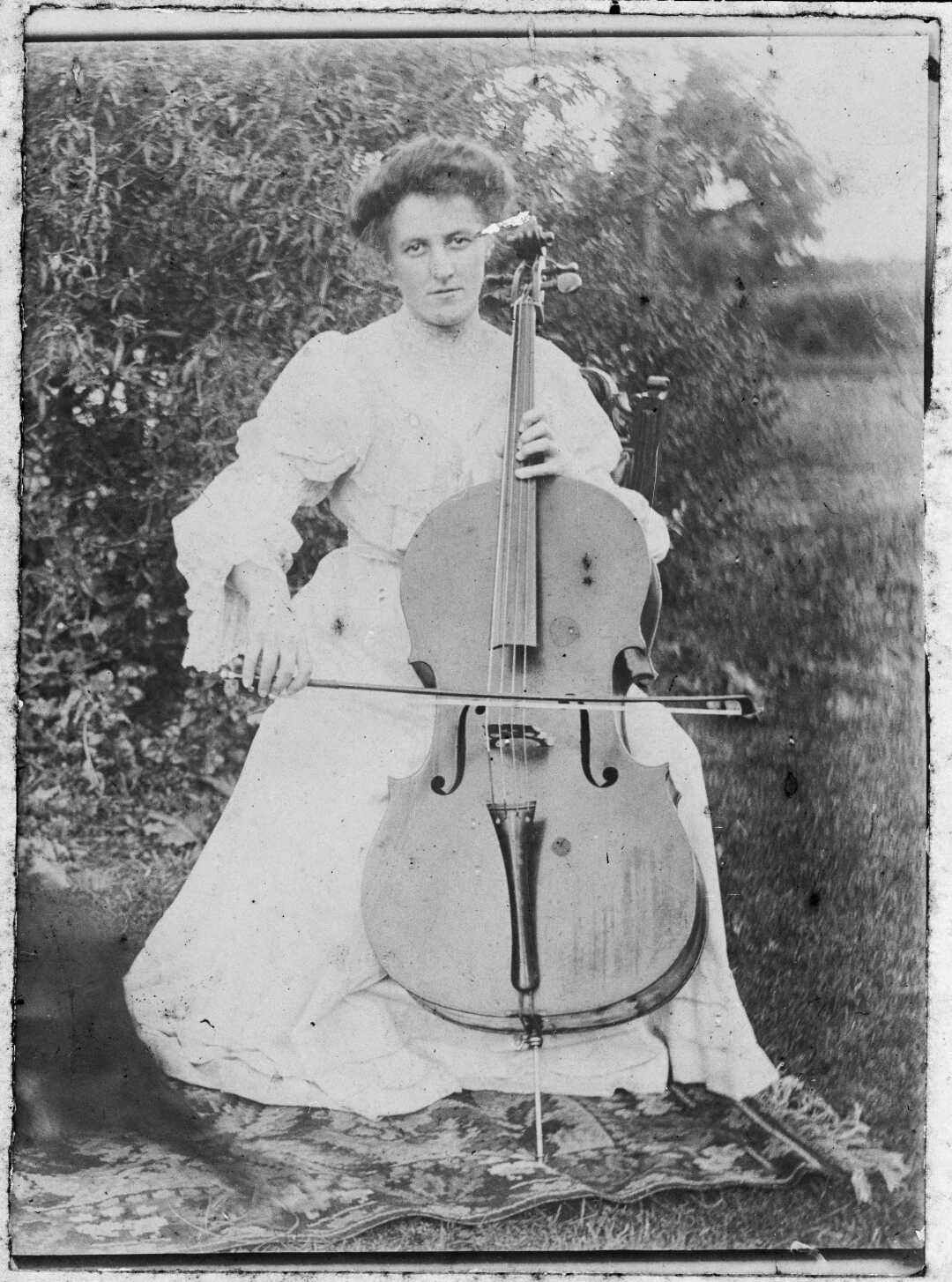
- Born: 28 March 1885; Wanganui
- Died: 12 December 1964 (aged 79)

Edith Marion Collier (28 March 1885 – 12 December 1964) was an early modern painter from New Zealand.

== Biography ==
Brought up and educated in Whanganui, Collier received a thorough although conservative art education studying at the Technical School in Whanganui.

At the age of 27 Collier then travelled to Britain in 1913 and studied at the St John's Wood School of Art in London and toured throughout the United Kingdom, executing works in St. Ives, Cornwall; Glasgow Scotland; Bonmahn, Southern Ireland among others. Through her works, Collier explored the media of oil paint, watercolour, printmaking and pencil drawing. After spending almost a decade receiving professional artistic training, Collier returned to provincial Whanganui where her works were met with criticism as a result of her assimilation into the radical innovations of British modernism and New Zealand's dissimilar art scene at the time. For this reason, her work is largely unknown at home and overseas.

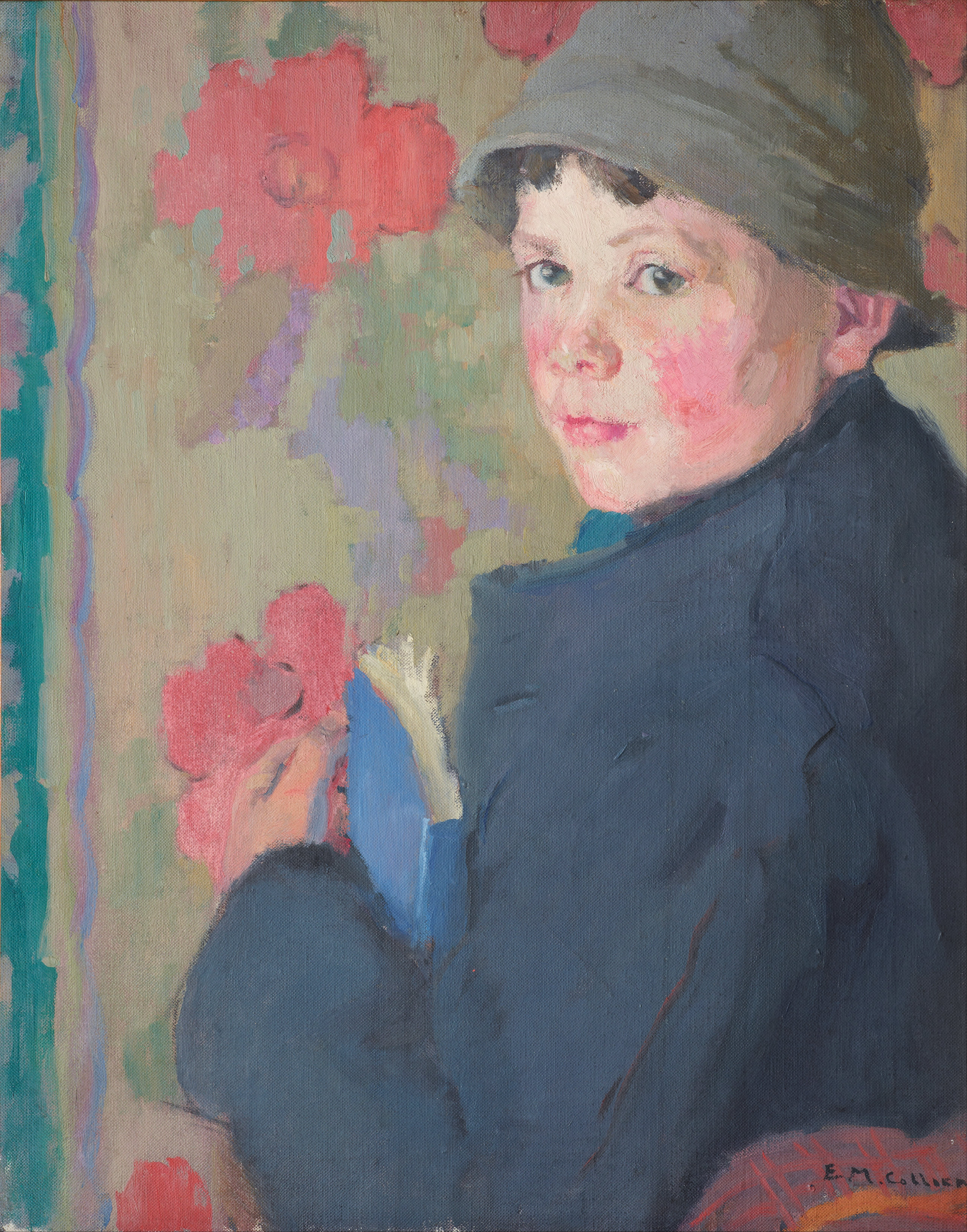
Little schoolboy of Bonmahon, circa 1915, oil on canvas, 496 × 395 mm, Te Papa

Collier returned to New Zealand in 1922 as an experienced artist with innovative ideas, but as a spinster in provincial Whanganui received harsh treatment, including what Joanne Drayton describes as savage, critical assessment and negative response from her own community. In a well-known incident her father burned many of her best paintings, including her nude studies.

A street is named after her in the suburb of St Johns Hill, Whanganui. The Edith Collier Trust works to raise awareness of Collier's life work and legacy. The Trust was incorporated under the Charitable Trusts Act 1957 on 28 November 1994. The Trust and the Sarjeant Gallery Te Whare o Rehua, in Whanganui, have a collaborative partnership where the Sarjeant Gallery stores and cares for the majority of Collier's surviving works, books and ephemera which belong to the Trust. The catalogue of the archived works can be viewed in the Sarjeant Gallery's online collection. This collection also includes several photographs of Collier by Annie Elizabeth Davis, that were taken prior to Collier leaving to study in the UK.
