= Sarjeant Gallery =

Regional art museum in Whanganui, New Zealand

Coordinates: 39°55′52.38″S 175°3′11.96″E

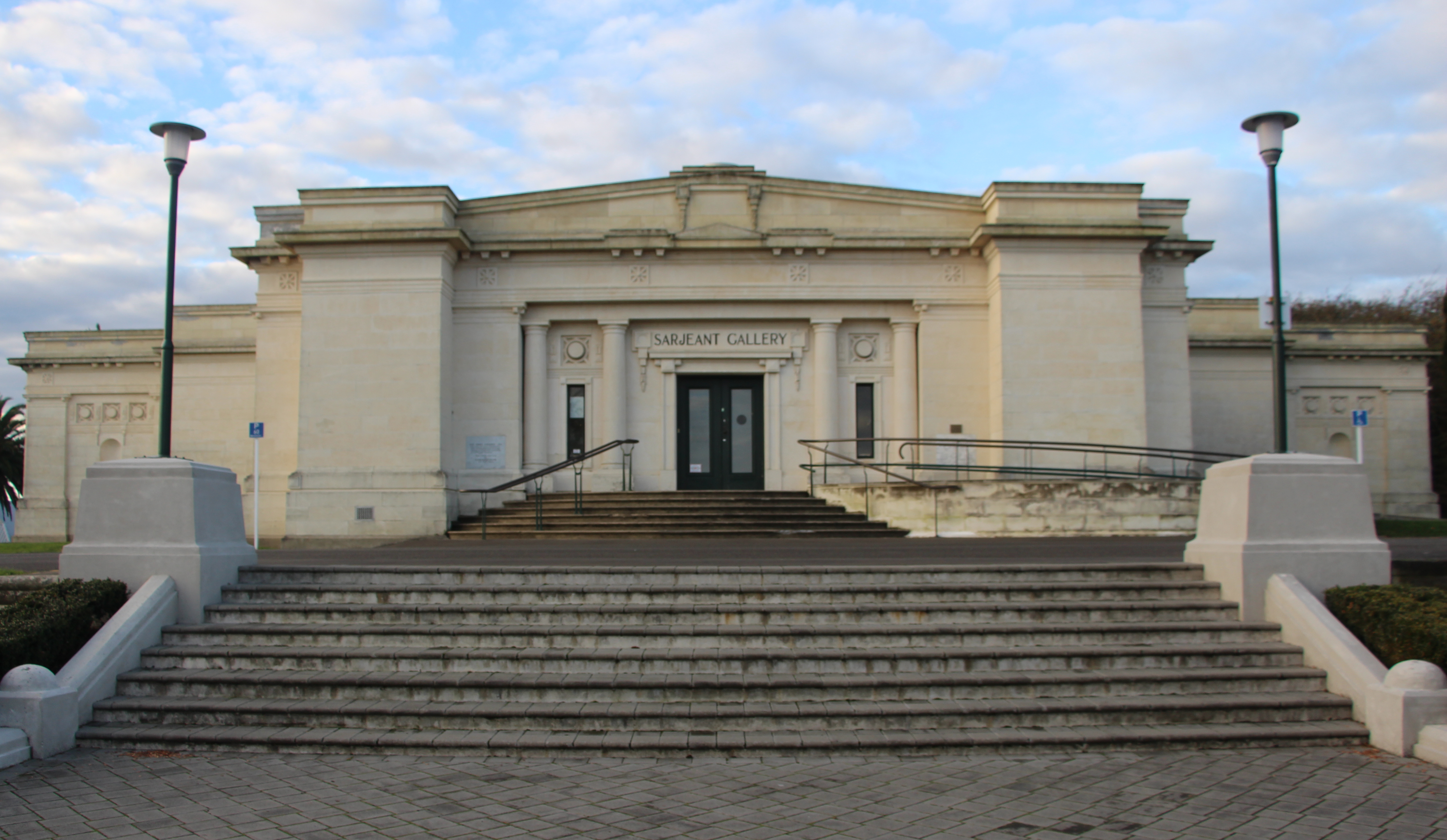
Sarjeant Gallery in Whanganui

The Sarjeant Gallery, also known as Te Whare o Rehua Sarjeant Gallery, at Pukenamu, Queen's Park Whanganui is a regional art museum with a collection of international and New Zealand art. It was closed for 10 years for redevelopment and re-opened on Saturday 9 November 2024. In 2024 it was announced as a 2024 NatGeo Best of the World pick.

== Founding and building ==
The Sarjeant Gallery was built as the result of a bequest to the city by Henry Sarjeant in 1912. Sarjeant bequeathed the money "for the inspiration of ourselves and those who come after us." A competition was held to select an architect for the project; the winner was Dunedin architect Edmund Anscombe, but it is likely the actual design was completed by a young student in his offices named Donald Hosie. The original cruciform, neo-classical style gallery was opened in 1919. Four galleries branch off a central space capped with an oculus in a hemispherical dome.

Sarjeant's wife Ellen Sarjeant (nee Stewart, later Neame) was instrumental in the formation of the early collection and establishing the administrative systems to support the operations in the early days of the gallery.

The building is registered with the New Zealand Historic Places Trust (now Heritage New Zealand) as a Category I Historic Place with registration number 167, and has the highest possible listing under the New Zealand Historic Places Trust Act.

The Māori name Te Whare o Rehua, gifted by local iwi in 1995, means House of Inspiration.

=== Redevelopment Project ===
In 1999 the Christchurch-based architecture firm Warren and Mahoney won a competition for the redevelopment of the Sarjeant Gallery. This redevelopment included seismic strengthening, restoration and the addition of a north-facing extension which would not be visible from the iconic south-facing facade.

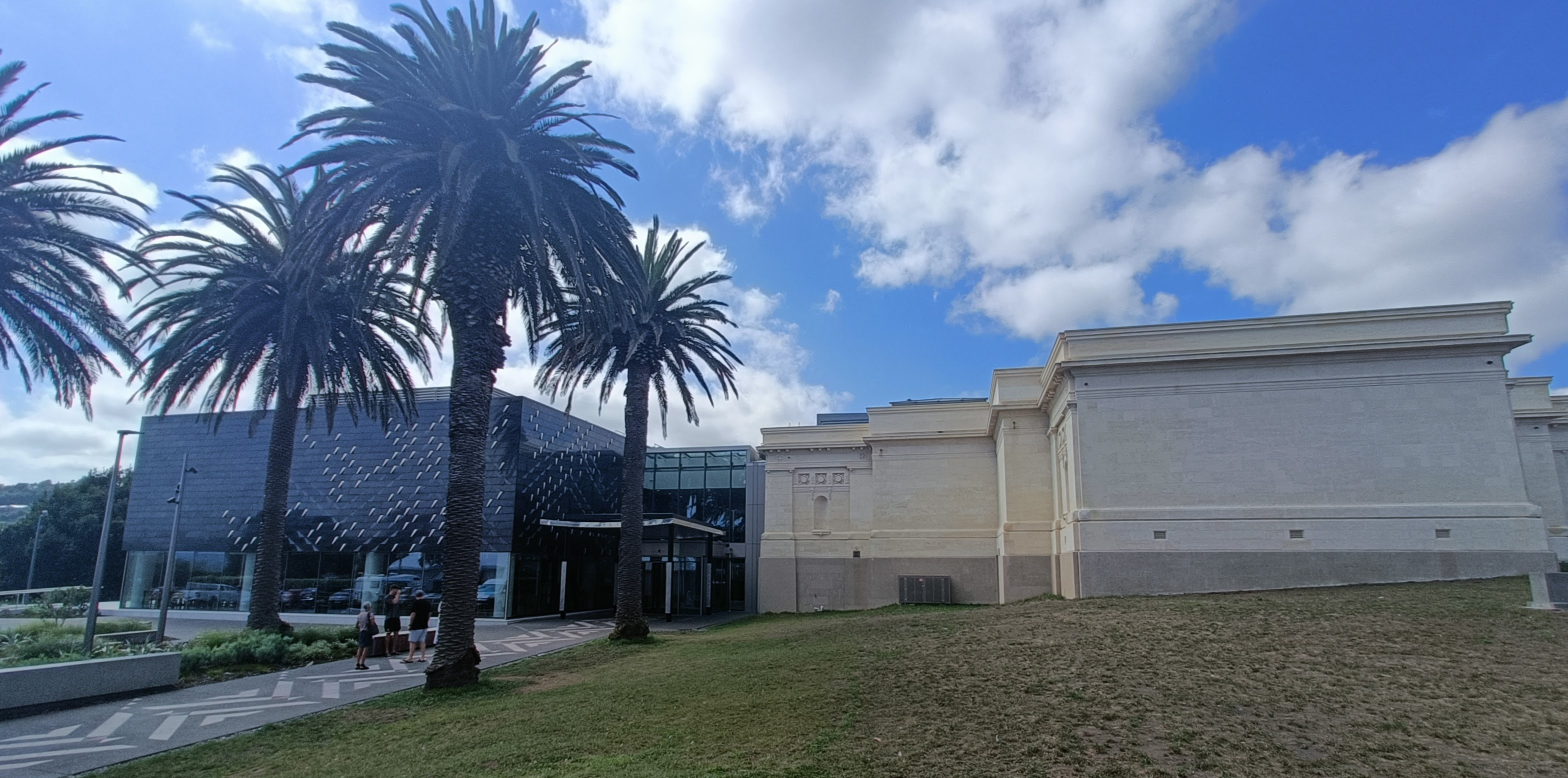
New wing: Te Pātaka o Tā Te Atawhai Archie John Taiaroa, Sarjeant Gallery, Whanganui, New Zealand. Opened in 2024.

In 2014 the entire Sarjeant collection and gallery shifted to new, temporary premises on Taupo Quay, in central Whanganui while the redevelopment took place. Funds for the redevelopment came from central government, the gallery trust, private and public trusts, corporate sponsorship and the Whanganui District Council. Warren and Mahoney co-designed the redevelopment with local iwi artist group Te Kāhui Toi o Tūpoho which consisted of expanding the existing gallery, building a new storage facility and a new wing. The new wing was dedicated to local Māori leader Archie Taiaroa and named Te Pātaka o Tā Te Atawhai Archie John Taiaroa. The re-opening took place on 9 November 2024. Writer Martin Edmond was commissioned to write a history of the gallery Te Whare o Rehua Sarjeant Gallery: A Whanganui biography.

== Collections ==
There are more than 8,300 artworks in the gallery's collection, spanning 400 years. Initially focused on 19th and early 20th century British and European art but, given the expansive terms of the will of benefactor Henry Sarjeant, the collection now spans 16th century through to the 21st century. Among the collections are historic and modern works in all media – on paper, sculptures, pottery, ceramics and glass; bronze works; video art; and paintings by contemporary artists and old masters. International artists featured in the collection include Edward Coley Burne-Jones, Domenico Piola, Frank Brangwyn, Bernardino Poccetti, Gaspard Dughet, William Richmond, William Etty, Lelio Orsi, Frederick Goodall, and Augustus John. Among the New Zealand born or based artists featured in the collection are Colin McCahon, Ralph Hotere, Pat Hanly, Peter Nicholls, Charles Frederick Goldie, Gottfried Lindauer and Petrus van der Velden.

The Sarjeant also has a major collection of the works of Whanganui-born painter Edith Collier, and the most significant collection of works by Joan Grehan, also Whanganui-born. Another prominent Northland artist featured in the gallery's collection is Kathleen Airini Vane, known for her landscapes of New Zealand.

The majority of the collection is accessible online: Explore the Sarjeant Gallery collection

== Tylee Cottage Residency ==
Since 1986, the Sarjeant Gallery has facilitated the Tylee Cottage Residency.

== Leadership ==
The gallery's first professional director was Gordon H. Brown, who took the role in 1974 and resigned in 1977. Brown implemented a programme of changing exhibitions and made important contemporary acquisitions for the collection. For most of the Sarjeant's contemporary history, the gallery was led by Brown's successor, Bill Milbank, who joined the organisation in 1975 and served as director from 1978 to 2006. The Tylee Cottage Residency programme began during Milbank's tenure, as did the ongoing series of dome installations, which officially began with artist Billy Apple's removal of the sculpture, The Wrestlers in 1979, although there had been earlier installations. Greg Anderson took the role of director next, remaining for 15 years before departing for a role at Auckland Art Gallery in late 2022. Former Te Uru director, Andrew Clifford, was appointed at the end of 2022, taking up the role in March 2023.

== Awards ==
The redeveloped gallery was selected in 2024 by National Geographic as a Top 20 "Best of the World" Cultural site.
