= Culture of New Zealand =

The culture of New Zealand is a synthesis of indigenous Māori, colonial British, and other cultural influences. The country's earliest inhabitants brought with them customs and language from Polynesia, and during the centuries of isolation, developed their own Māori and Moriori cultures. British colonists in the 19th century brought Western culture and had a dramatic effect on the indigenous inhabitants, spreading Western religious traditions and the English language. Over time, a distinct Pākehā or New Zealand European culture emerged.

More recent immigration from the Pacific, East Asia, and South Asia has added to the cultural diversity in New Zealand. The biggest cultural influence in New Zealand remains Western, with a strong focus on democracy and egalitarianism. Māori culture continues to be an essential part of the national identity, with ongoing efforts to recognise and honour the Māori language and Māori traditions.

Ministry for Culture and Heritage showed 'that the arts and creative sector contributed $14.9 billion to New Zealand's GDP for the year ending March 2022', this is 4.2% of the total economy and is the highest since 2000 when recording began. As of March 2022, 115,000 people were primarily employed in the creative sector (32% self-employed).

== Cultural history ==
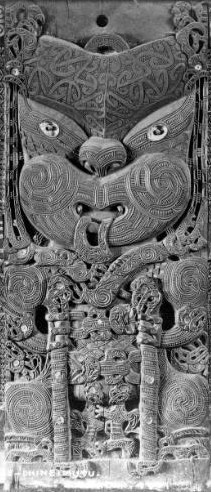
A Māori ancestor (tekoteko) depicted in a wood carving at the Tamatekapua Meeting House in Ohinemutu (c. 1880)

Polynesian explorers reached the islands between 1250 and 1300. Over the ensuing centuries of Polynesian expansion and settlement, Māori culture developed from its Polynesian roots. Māori established separate tribes, built fortified villages (pā), hunted and fished, traded commodities, developed agriculture, arts and weaponry, and kept a detailed oral history. At some point, a group of Māori migrated to Rēkohu, now known as the Chatham Islands, where they developed their distinct Moriori culture. Regular European contact began from 1800, and British immigration proceeded rapidly, especially from 1855. European colonists had a dramatic effect on the Māori, bringing Christianity, advanced technology, the English language, numeracy and literacy. In 1840 Māori chiefs signed the Treaty of Waitangi, intended to enable the tribes to live peacefully with the colonists. However, after several incidents, the New Zealand Wars broke out from 1845, with Māori suffering a loss of land, partly through confiscation, but mainly through widespread and extensive land sales. Māori retained their identity, mostly choosing to live separately from settlers and continuing to speak and write Māori. With mass migration from Europe, a high Māori death rate and low life expectancy for Māori women, the indigenous population figure dropped between 1850 and 1930, becoming a minority.

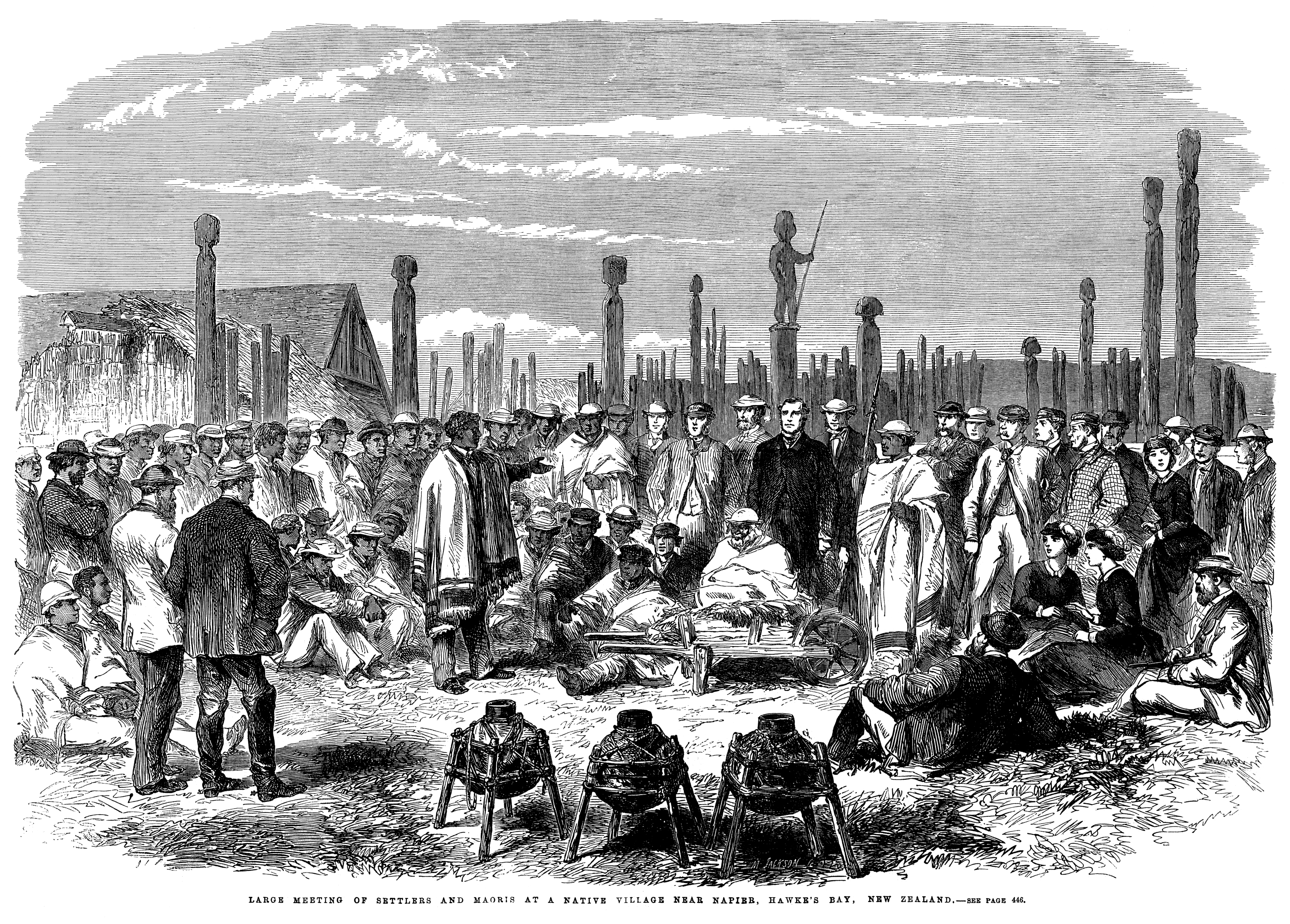
A meeting of European and Māori inhabitants of Hawke's Bay Province. Engraving, 1863.

European New Zealanders (Pākehā), despite their location far from Europe, retained strong cultural ties to "Mother England". These ties were weakened by the demise of the British Empire and loss of special access to British meat and dairy markets. Pākehā began to forge a separate identity influenced by their pioneering history, a rural lifestyle and New Zealand's unique environment. Pākehā culture became prevalent after the wars, but after sustained political efforts, biculturalism and the Treaty of Waitangi became part of the school curriculum in the late 20th century, to promote understanding between Māori and Pākehā.

More recently, New Zealand culture has been broadened by globalisation and immigration from the Pacific Islands, East Asia and South Asia. Non-Māori Polynesian cultures are apparent, with the Pasifika Festival, the world's largest Polynesian festival, now an annual event in Auckland.

The development of a New Zealand identity and national character, separate from the British colonial identity, is most often linked with the period surrounding World War I, which gave rise to the concept of the Anzac spirit. Many citizens prefer to minimise ethnic divisions, simply calling themselves New Zealanders or, informally, "Kiwis". New Zealand marks two national days of remembrance, Waitangi Day and Anzac Day, and also celebrates holidays during or close to the anniversaries of the founding dates of each province.

== New Zealand European culture ==
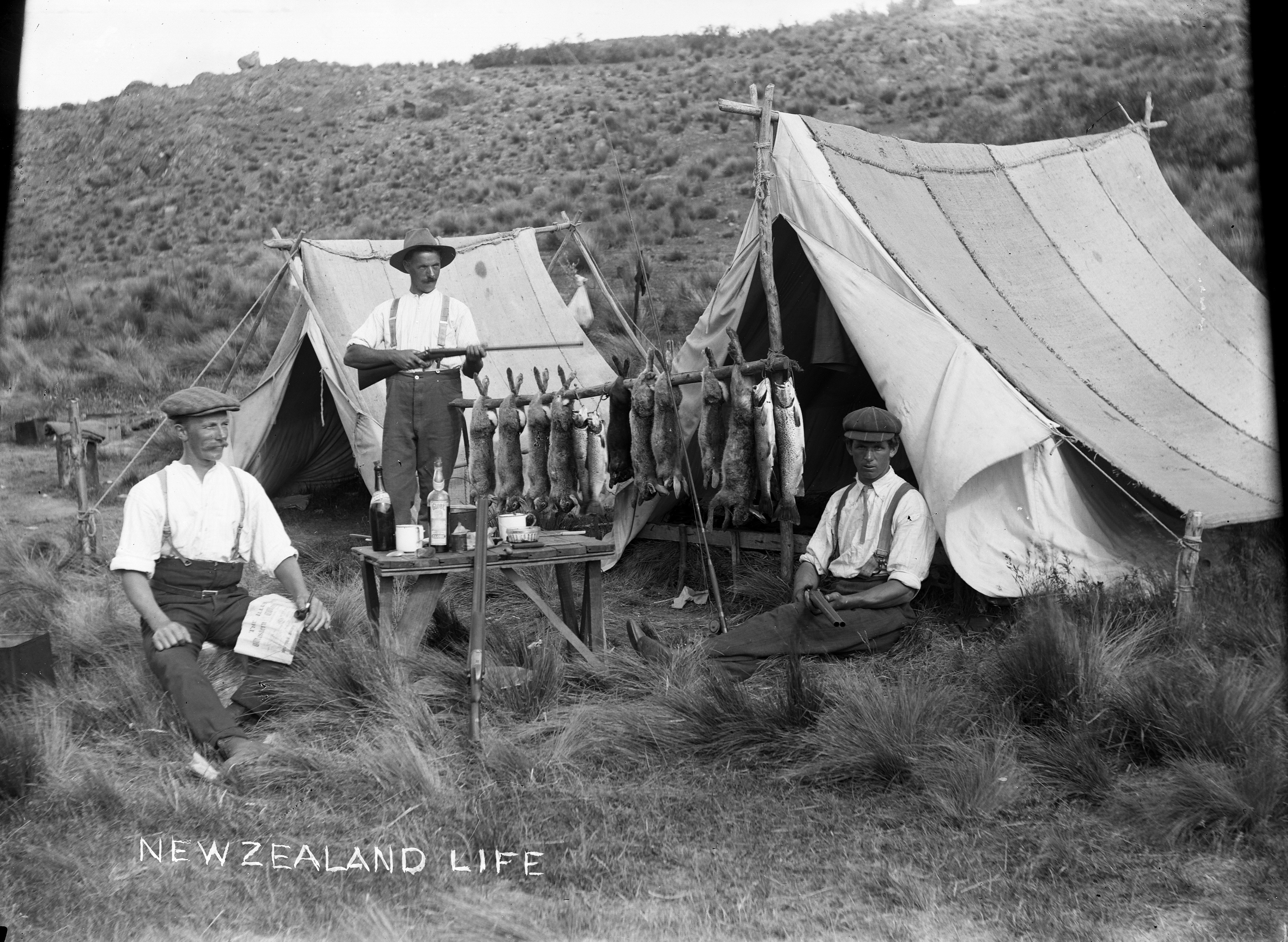
European settlers developed an identity that was influenced by their rustic lifestyle. In this scene from 1909, men at their camp site display a catch of rabbits and fish.

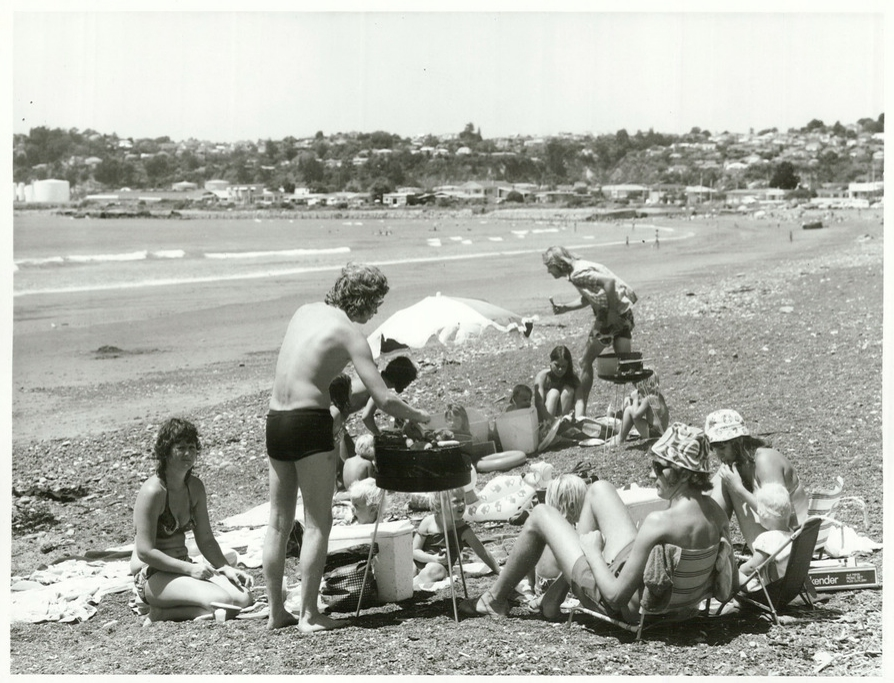
A beach barbecue – an established part of New Zealand culture

Pākehā culture (usually synonymous with New Zealand European culture) derives mainly from that of the European (mostly British) settlers who colonised New Zealand in the 19th century. Europeans migrated to New Zealand in increasing numbers from 1855. The Treaty of Waitangi in 1840 formed the basis of the establishment of British rule in New Zealand. New Zealand became partly self-governing in 1852 with the establishment of its own Parliament. There was conflict between Māori and European settlers especially between 1863 and 1864 which resulted in land being confiscated from the defeated tribes.

Until about the 1950s many Pākehā saw themselves as British people, and retained strong cultural ties to "Mother England". Yet there was a common perception that people born in New Zealand were likely to be physically stronger and more adaptable than people in Britain. The largely rural life in early New Zealand led to the image of New Zealanders being rugged, industrious problem solvers. Another distinctive trait of Pākehā culture has been the egalitarian tradition, as opposed to the British class system. Within Pākehā culture there are also sub-cultures derived from Irish, Italian and other European groups, as well as various non-ethnic subcultures.

One of the goals of Pākehā anti-racist groups of the 1980s was to enable Pākehā to see their own culture as such, rather than thinking what they did was normal and what other people did was 'ethnic' and strange. Some argue that belief in the 'absence' of culture in New Zealand is a symptom of white privilege, allowing members of a dominant group to see their culture as 'normal' or 'default', rather than as a specific position of relative advantage.

From the 1980s Pākehā began to further explore their distinctive traditions and to argue that New Zealanders had a culture which was neither Māori nor British. There was an interest in "Kiwiana"—items from New Zealand's heritage that are seen as representing iconic Kiwi elements, such as the pōhutukawa (New Zealand Christmas tree), pāua-shell ash-tray, Buzzy Bee, Pineapple Lumps, gumboots and jandals.

== Māori culture ==
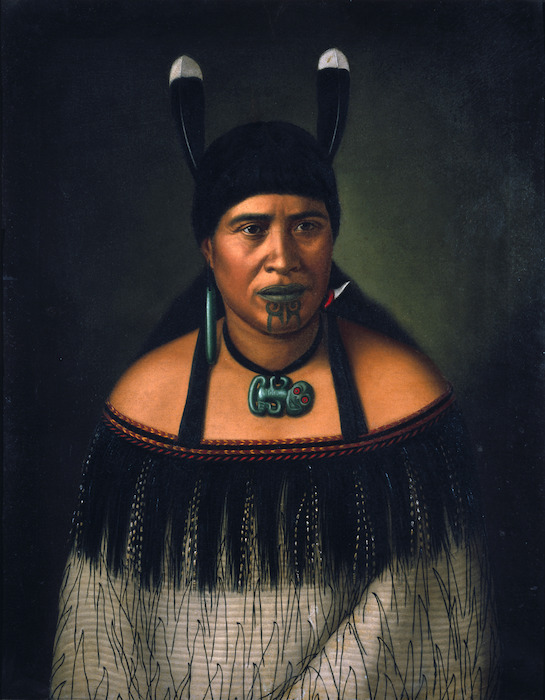
Hinepare of Ngāti Kahungunu, is wearing a traditional korowai cloak adorned with a black fringe border. The two huia feathers in her hair, indicate a chiefly lineage. She also wears a pounamu hei-tiki and earring, as well as a shark tooth (mako) earring. The moko-kauae (chin-tattoo) is often based on one's role in the iwi.

The Māori are the indigenous inhabitants of New Zealand. They originated settlers from eastern Polynesian islands, who arrived in New Zealand in several waves of canoe voyages at some time between 1250 and 1300. Māori settled the islands and developed a distinct culture over several hundred years. Oral history tells of a long voyage from Hawaiki (the mythical homeland in tropical Polynesia) in large ocean-going canoes (waka). Māori mythology is a distinctive corpus of gods and heroes, sharing some Polynesian motifs. Significant figures are Ranginui and Papatūānuku, Māui, and Kupe.

Central to many cultural events is the marae, where families and tribes gather for special occasions, such as pōwhiri or tangi. Māori often call themselves "tangata whenua" (people of the land), placing particular importance on a lifestyle connected to land and sea.

The distinct values, history, and worldview of Māori are expressed through traditional arts and skills such as haka, tā moko, waiata (music), carving, weaving, and poi. The concept of tapu (meaning taboo or sacred) is also a strong force in Māori culture, applied to objects, people, or even mountains.

== Other ethnic cultures ==
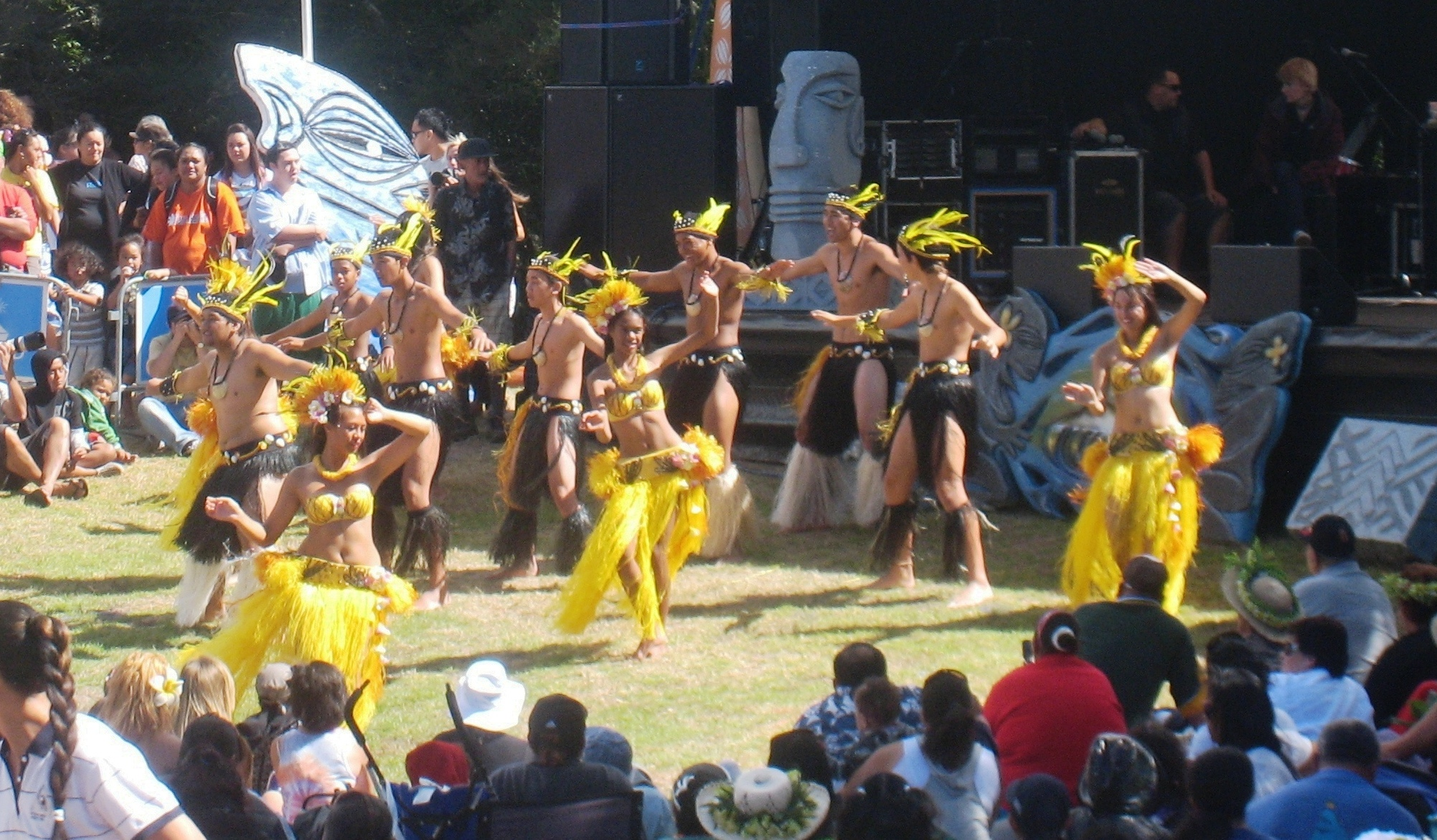
Cook Island dancers at Auckland's Pasifika Festival, 2010

Ethnic communities within New Zealand retain features of their own cultures, and these have, in some areas, spread to become popular with the general population. Settler groups from many cultures added to the make-up of the country, with many groups concentrated around specific geographic areas. These include Dalmatian settlers in Northland, Danish settlers in inland Hawke's Bay, and Southern Chinese and Levantine settlers in Otago. These added to larger-scale Pākehā settlement which itself varied between English settlers (e.g., in Canterbury), Irish settlers (e.g., on the South Island West Coast), and Scottish settlers (e.g., in Otago and Southland).

From the mid-20th century on, waves of immigrants have entered the country from different ethnic backgrounds, notably Dutch and central Europeans during the 1950s, Pacific Islanders since the 1960s, and northern Chinese, Indians, and southeast Asians since the 1980s. Various aspects of each culture have added to New Zealand culture; Chinese New Year is celebrated for example, especially in Auckland and Dunedin, and South Auckland has strong Samoan cultural links. To celebrate its diverse Pacific cultures, the Auckland region hosts several Pacific Island festivals. Two of the major ones are Polyfest, which showcases performances of the secondary school cultural groups in the Auckland region, and Pasifika, a festival that celebrates Pacific island heritage through traditional food, music, dance, and entertainment.

The popular music style of Urban Pasifika also has its origins in the New Zealand Pacific Island community, and has become a major strand in New Zealand music culture. The annual Pacific Music Awards recognise the contribution to New Zealand music made by Pacific Island musicians and musical styles. Pacific island heritage is also celebrated in much of New Zealand's fine art, with artists such as Fatu Feu'u, Lily Laita, John Pule, Yuki Kihara, and Michel Tuffery.

== Languages ==
New Zealand has three official languages. English is the primary and de facto official language. The Māori language and New Zealand Sign Language are official languages but are used by a minority of the population. Other languages are also spoken in New Zealand.

=== New Zealand English ===
Speech example
An example of a male New Zealand English speaker from Auckland.

New Zealand English is close to Australian English in pronunciation, but has several differences often overlooked by people from outside these countries. The most prominent differences between the New Zealand English dialect and other English dialects are the shifts in the short front vowels: the short-"i" sound (as in "kit") has centralised towards the schwa sound (the "a" in "comma" and "about"); the short-"e" sound (as in "dress") has moved towards the short-"i" sound; and the short-"a" sound (as in "trap") has moved to the short-"e" sound. Some of these differences show New Zealand English to have more affinity with the English of southern England than Australian English does. Several of the differences also show the influence of Māori speech. The New Zealand accent also has some Scottish and Irish influences from the large number of settlers from those places during the 19th century. At the time of the 2013 census, English was spoken by 96.1% of the total population.

=== Te reo Māori ===
An Eastern Polynesian language, te reo Māori is closely related to Tahitian and Cook Islands Māori; slightly less closely to Hawaiian and Marquesan; and more distantly to the languages of Western Polynesia, including Samoan, Niuean and Tongan. The Māori language went into decline in terms of use following European colonisation, but since the 1970s efforts have been made to reverse this trend. These include the granting of official language status through the Māori Language Act 1987, a Māori language week and a Māori television channel. The 2013 census found that Māori was spoken by 3.7% of the population. Beginning in about 2015, the language underwent a revival as it became increasingly popular, as a common national heritage and shared cultural identity, even among New Zealanders without Māori roots. Surveys from 2018 indicated that "the Māori language currently enjoys a high status in Māori society and also positive acceptance by the majority of non-Māori New Zealanders".

There are distinct dialects of te reo Māori, 'mita'.

- In Northland with Ngāpuhi, instead of hearing whakarongo, to listen – with a sharp "F" sound at the beginning – you are more likely to hear it being pronounced as "hakarongo".
- Tūhoe speakers change the "ng" sound into an "n" sound and whakarongo becomes "whakarono".
- Ngāi Tahu – Kai Tahu – in the South Island change the "ng" sound into a "k" sound and it becomes: "whakaroko".
- In Whanganui/Taranaki, the "wh" sound becomes a glottal stop – where the "h" is lost altogether, so whakarongo becomes: "w'akarongo". (Michael Neilson, The Herald 2020)

=== New Zealand Sign Language ===
New Zealand Sign Language has its roots in British Sign Language (BSL), and may be technically considered a dialect of British, Australian and New Zealand Sign Language (BANZSL). There are 62.5% similarities found in British Sign Language and NZSL, compared with 33% of NZSL signs found in American Sign Language. Like other natural sign languages, it was devised by and for deaf people, with no linguistic connection to a spoken or written language, and it is fully capable of expressing anything a fluent signer wants to say. It uses more lip-patterns in conjunction with hand and facial movement to cue signs than BSL, reflecting New Zealand's history of oralist education of deaf people. Its vocabulary includes Māori concepts such as marae and tangi, and signs for New Zealand placenames. New Zealand Sign Language became an official language of New Zealand in April 2006. About 20,000 people use New Zealand Sign Language.

=== Other languages ===
According to the 2013 census, 174 languages are used in New Zealand (including sign languages). As recorded in the 2013 census, Samoan is the most widely spoken non-official language (2.2%), followed by Hindi (1.7%), "Northern Chinese" (including Mandarin, 1.3%) and French (1.2%).

== National symbols ==
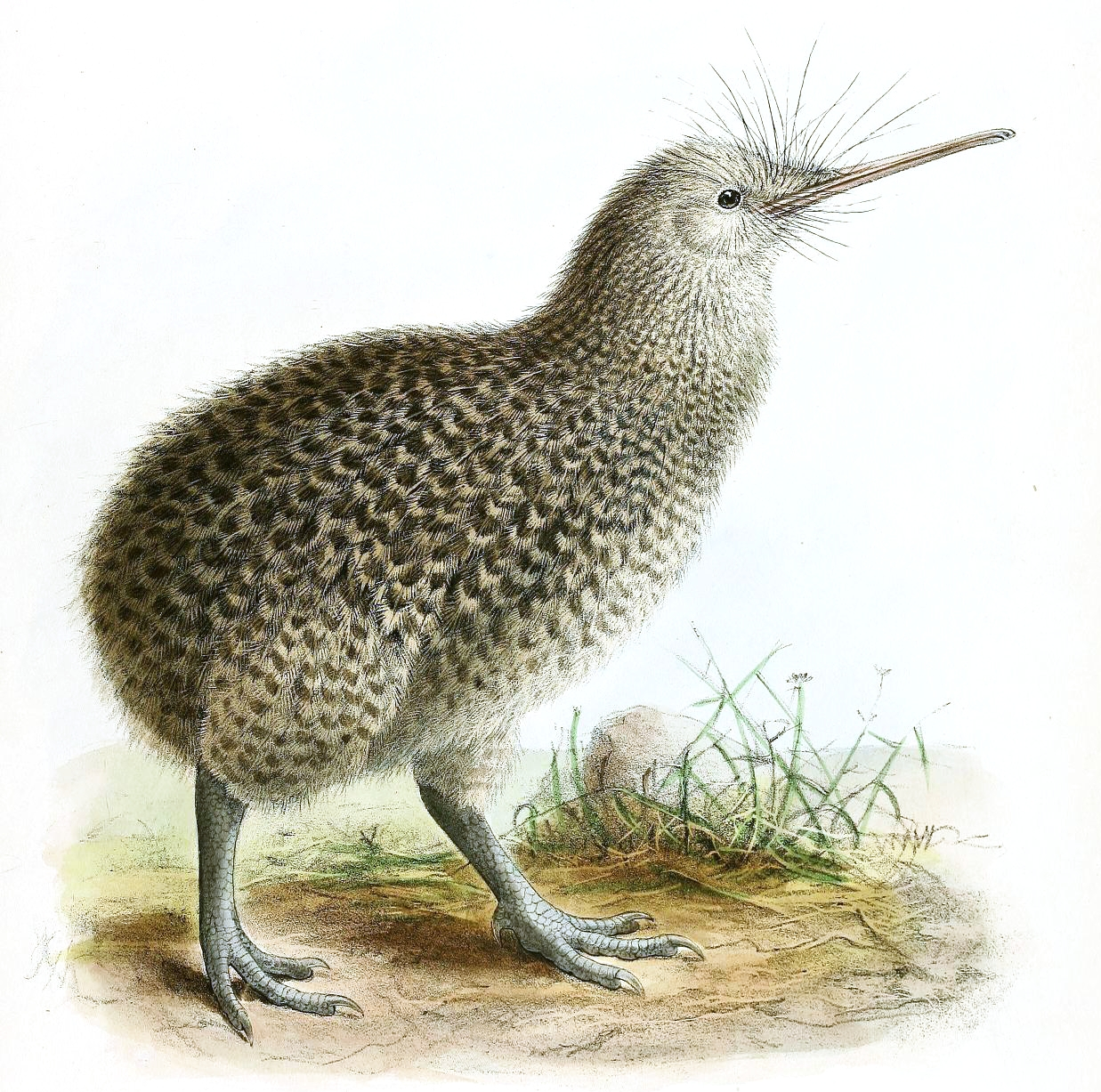
The kiwi has become a New Zealand icon.

New Zealand's national symbols are influenced by natural, historical, and Māori sources. New Zealand's location in the Southern Hemisphere was symbolised by the Southern Cross constellation in both the United Tribes' Flag (the first national flag, adopted in 1834) and the current national flag of New Zealand (since 1902). The silver fern is an emblem appearing on army insignia and sporting team uniforms, and various silver fern flags have been proposed as an alternative national flag.

Royal symbols of the monarchy of New Zealand continue to be featured in, for example, the coat of arms, the Defence Force, and the prefix His Majesty's New Zealand Ship.

The flightless kiwi has been used as a symbol of New Zealand since the early 1900s. For example, in 1905 The Westminster Gazette printed a cartoon of a kiwi and a kangaroo (representing Australia) going off to a colonial conference. Today "Kiwi" is a nickname for New Zealanders.

New Zealand has two national anthems of equal legal status, "God Save the King" and "God Defend New Zealand" – the latter of which is often sung with alternating Māori and English verses.

== Arts ==
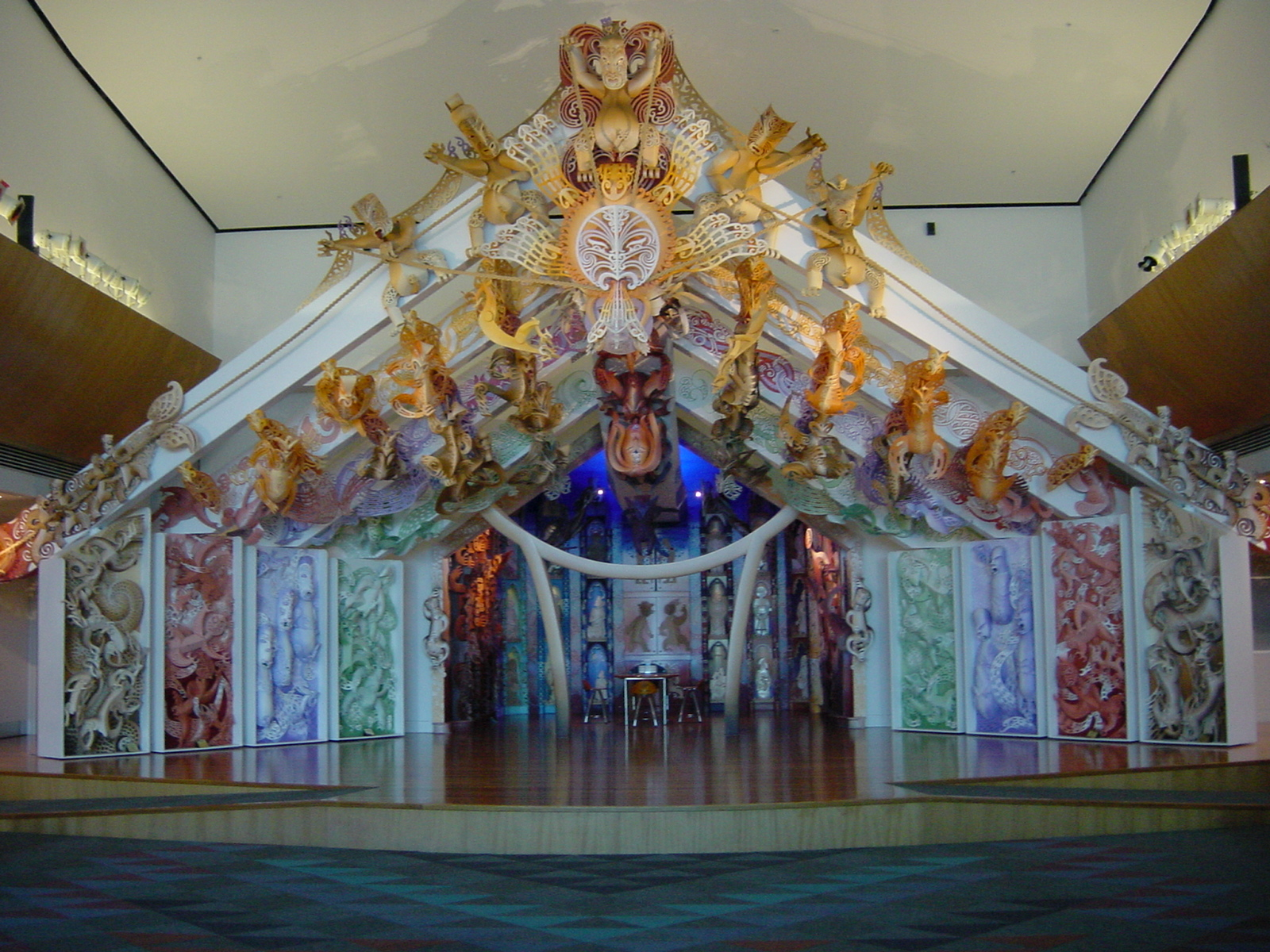
A modern wharenui (meeting house of a marae) exhibited at the Museum of New Zealand Te Papa Tongarewa

The definition of the arts by the New Zealand government covers six areas, visual arts, craft and object art, performing arts, literature, Pacific arts and Ngā toi Māori (Māori arts). Government funding is provided principally through, Creative New Zealand. Heritage New Zealand and the Ministry for Culture and Heritage are national bodies that assist with heritage preservation. Most towns and cities have museums and often art galleries, and the national museum and art gallery is Te Papa ('Our Place'), in Wellington.

Film, television and broadcasting has other government initiatives.

=== Kapa haka ===
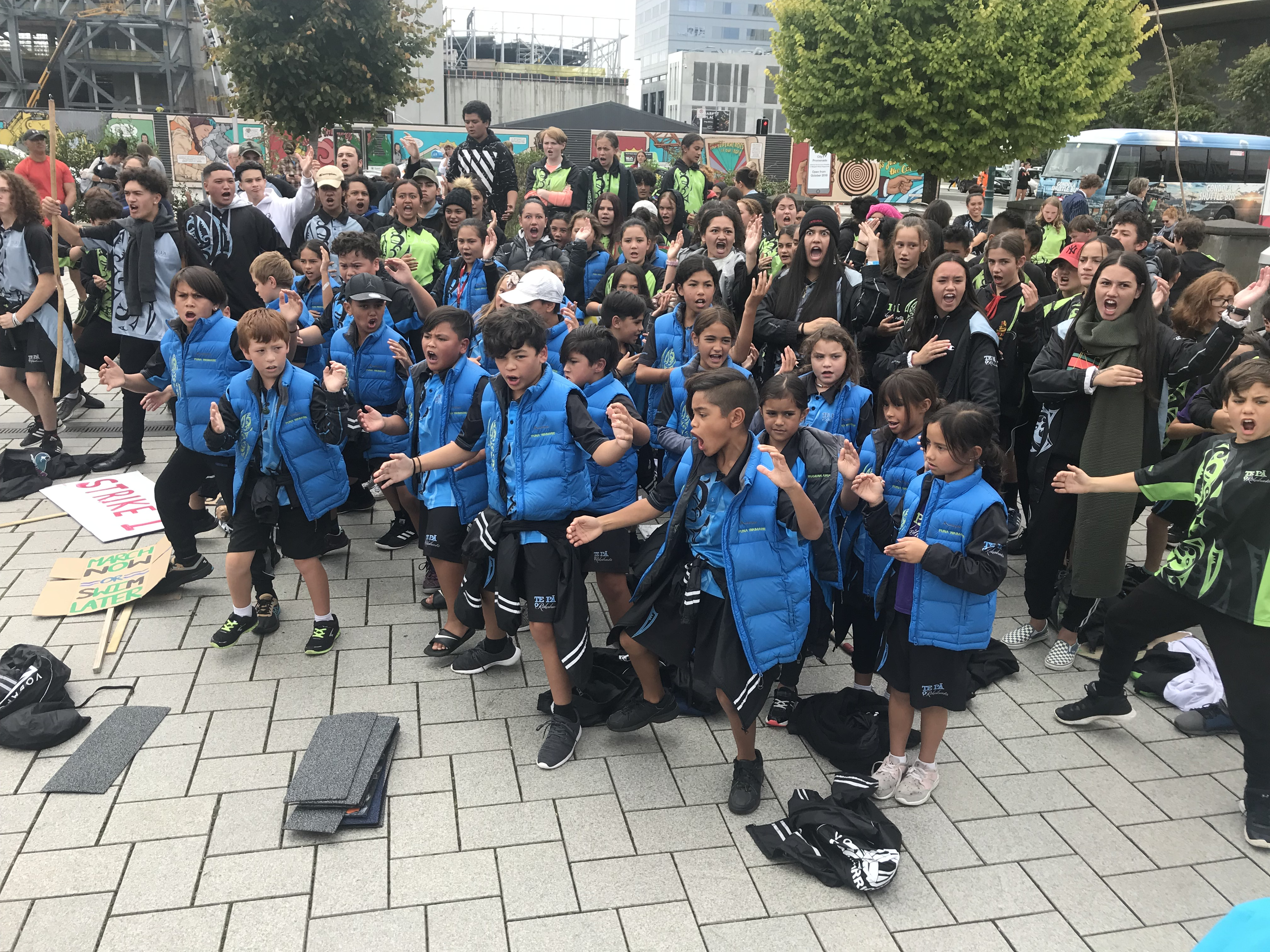
Kapa haka is performed at a School Strike for Climate in Christchurch 2019.

Kapa haka, (kapa means 'rank' or 'row') is an expression of Māori cultural identity in song and dance. There is a national biennial kapa haka competition Te Matatini with regional and schools competitions too. Kapa haka is used in many state occasions and to represent New Zealand. Haka is part of kapa haka and is often mistaken as being always a warrior challenge. It is well-known as being performed by the New Zealand rugby team the All Blacks before matches.

=== Visual arts ===
When settlers arrived, they brought with them Western artistic traditions. Early European art focused mainly on landscape painting, although some of the best known European artists of the 19th century (Charles Goldie and Gottfried Lindauer) specialised in Māori portraiture. Some Māori adopted Western styles and a number of 19th-century meeting houses feature walls painted with portraits and plant designs. From the early-20th-century Āpirana Ngata and others began a programme of reviving traditional Māori arts, and many new meeting houses were built with traditional carving and tukutuku woven wall panels were built.

A longstanding concern of Pākehā artists has been the creation of a distinctly New Zealand artistic style. Rita Angus and others used the landscape to try to achieve this while painters such as Gordon Walters used Māori motifs. A number of Māori artists, including Paratene Matchitt and Shane Cotton have combined Western modernism with traditional Māori art.

A 2021 portraiture award and touring exhibition the Kiingi Tuheitia Portraiture Award has the intention of showcasing emerging Māori artists and recording sharing stories of ancestors.

=== Architecture ===
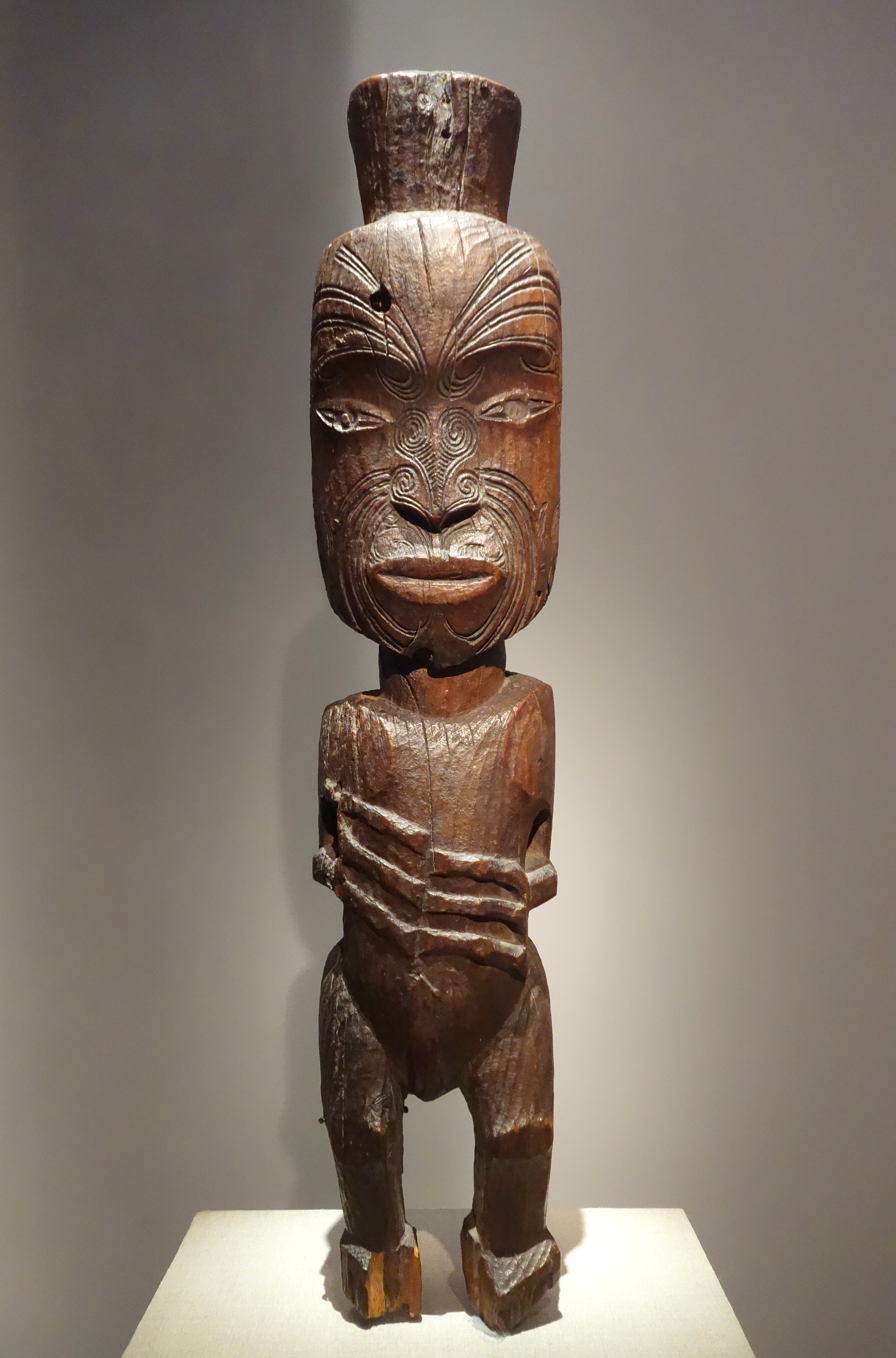
Tekoteko from the gable of a wharenui, Te Arawa (20th century)

Māori initially built semi-permanent wooden structures, and then from the 15th century onwards as Māori settled they built more permanent structures, including 'pātaka (storehouses), and kāuta (cooking houses)'. The wharenui that are seen today were developed in the mid-19th century. The contemporary architecture of New Zealand is influenced by various cultures but it is predominantly of a European style.

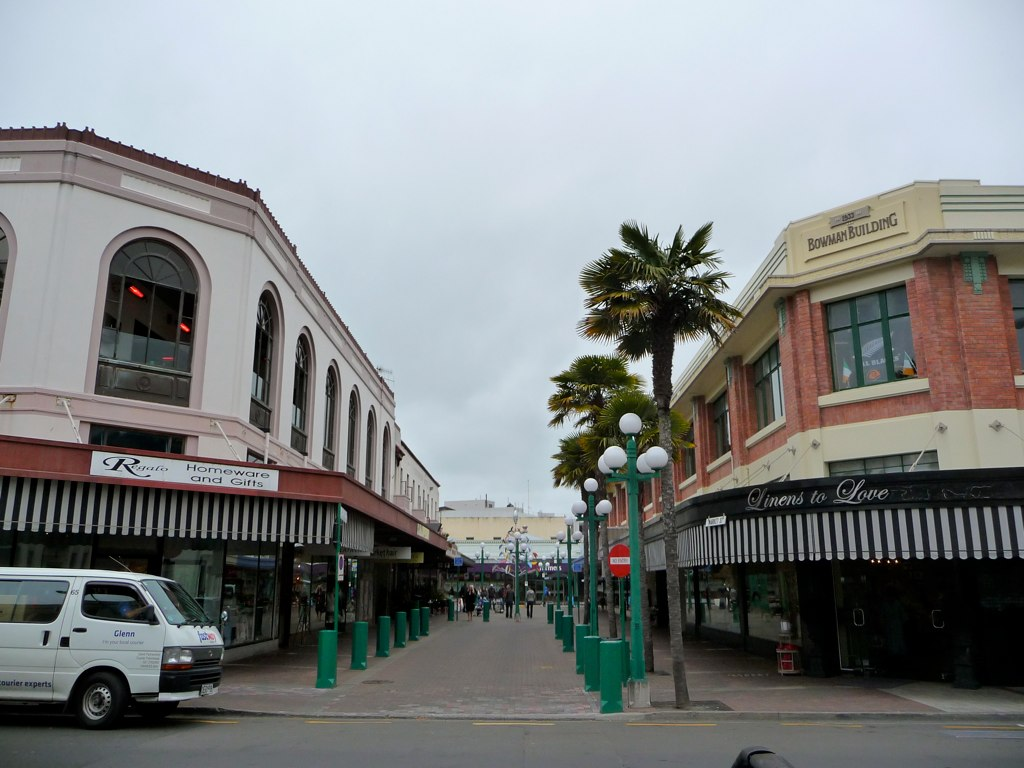
Art deco in Napier

Destructive earthquakes have influenced the built landscape of New Zealand, including less brick buildings and more wooden building in Wellington after a severe earthquake in 1855 early on in the British settlement. The 2010–11 Christchurch earthquakes have changed building approaches across New Zealand towards steel frame buildings especially in Christchurch and Wellington. Napier suffered an earthquake in 1931 creating an art deco re-build.

Nowhere else in the world will you find as immense a collection of Art Deco architecture in such a small space. (Sally Jackson, 2016)

=== Performing arts ===
==== Screen ====
The number of New Zealand films significantly increased during the 1970s. The highest-grossing New Zealand films are Hunt for the Wilderpeople, Boy, The World's Fastest Indian, Whale Rider, Once Were Warriors and The Piano. The country's diverse scenery and compact size, plus government incentives, have encouraged some producers to shoot big-budget productions in New Zealand, including The Lord of the Rings and The Hobbit film trilogies, Avatar, The Chronicles of Narnia, King Kong, Wolverine and The Last Samurai.

New Zealand is grappling with the effect of international streaming platforms in the New Zealand market. In 2023 the New Zealand's screen producers' guild, SPADA pointed out international streamers currently 'pay no tax in New Zealand, face no regulation, and use broadband infrastructure partially funded by our Government while at the same time impact local broadcasting viewership and advertising revenue'. Many other countries regulate these things.

==== Stage ====
There are a number of producing theatre companies in cities and towns and many regular arts festivals across New Zealand in the cities including the New Zealand Festival and Auckland Arts Festival, and smaller places like Hawkes Bay and Nelson. Roger Hall and Jacob Rajan are two playwrights to achieve considerable popular success writing New Zealand stories.

==== Music ====
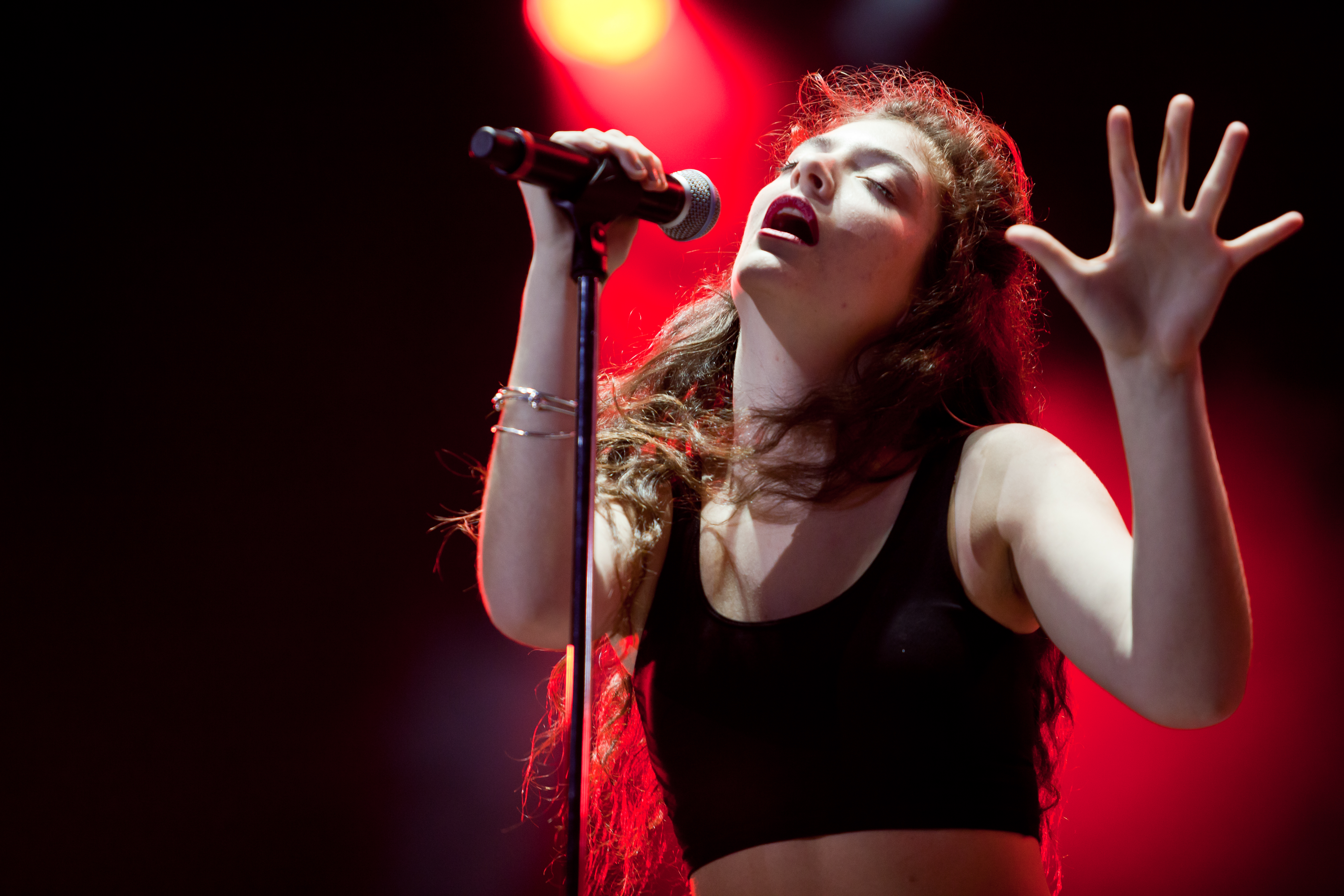
Lorde as part of the 2014 Lollapalooza lineup

New Zealand music has been influenced by blues, jazz, country, rock and roll and hip-hop, with many of these genres given a unique New Zealand interpretation. Hip-hop is popular and there are small but thriving live music, dance party and indie music scenes. Reggae is also popular within some communities, with bands such as Herbs, Katchafire, 1814, House Of Shem, Unity Pacific all reflecting their roots, perspectives and cultural pride and heritage through their music.

A number of popular artists have gone on to achieve international success including Lorde, Split Enz, Crowded House, OMC, Bic Runga, Kimbra, Ladyhawke, The Naked and Famous, Fat Freddy's Drop, Savage, Alien Weaponry, Flight of the Conchords, and Brooke Fraser.

New Zealand has a national orchestra and many regional orchestras. A number of New Zealand composers have developed international reputations. The most well-known include Douglas Lilburn, John Psathas, Jack Body, Gillian Whitehead, Jenny McLeod, Gareth Farr, Ross Harris, and Martin Lodge.

==== Comedy ====
In recent decades New Zealand comics have risen in popularity and recognition. In the 1970s and 1980s Billy T James satirized race relations, and McPhail & Gadsby lampooned political figures, especially Robert Muldoon. John Clarke aka Fred Dagg joked about rural life. From the 1990s onwards the Naked Samoans expressed humour relating to their experiences as Pasifika in New Zealand, who started out doing theatre and have created been part of films including Sione's Wedding. Raybon Kan is a prominent Asian comic and columnist. The Topp Twins are an off-beat comic/country music duo, and Flight of the Conchords have gained a cult following throughout the English-speaking world for their self-effacing show.

== Literature ==
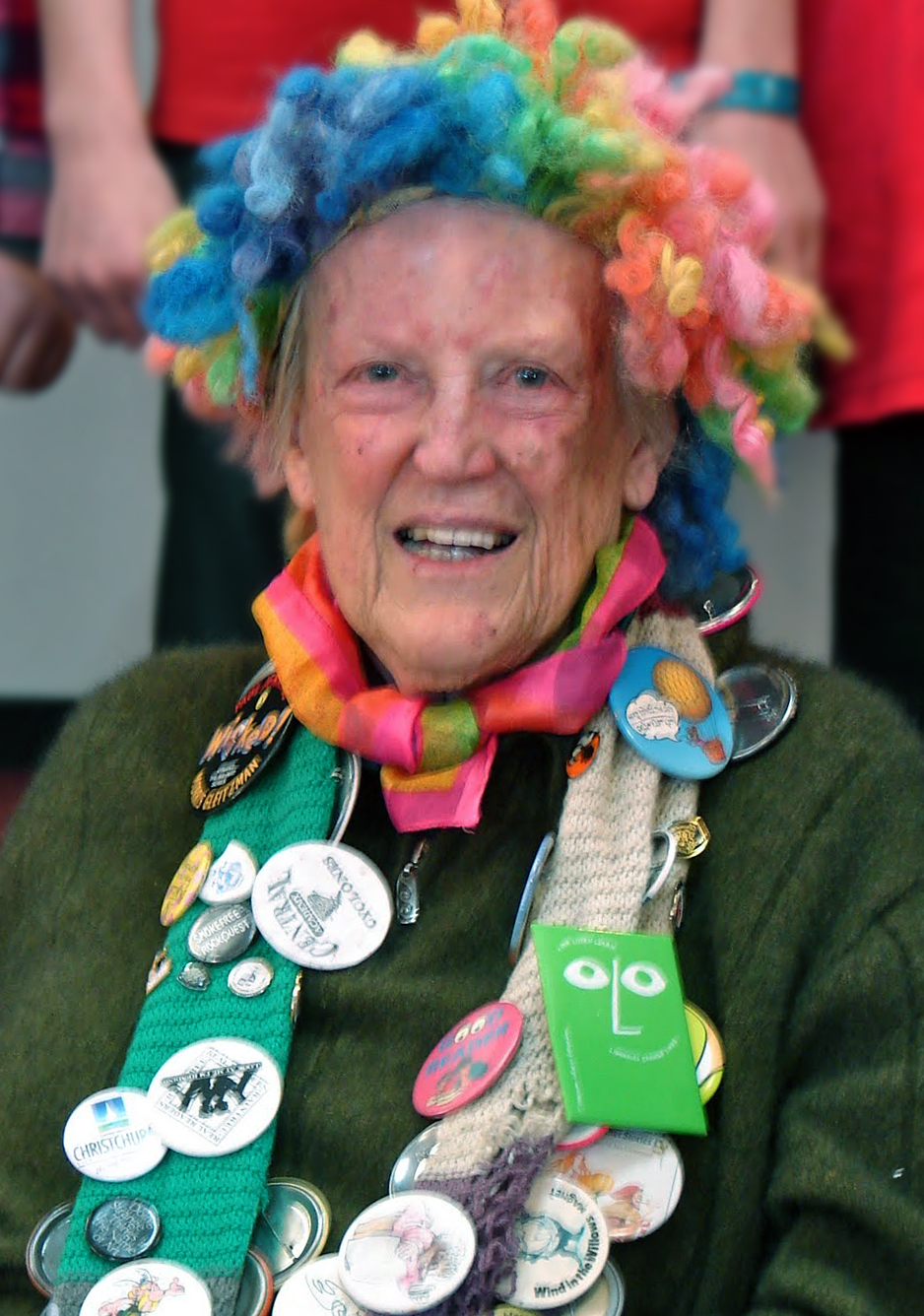
Children's and young adult author Margaret Mahy, July 2011

Pre-European Māori culture had a strong oral tradition of myths, legends, poetry, songs (waiata), and prayers. Early Pākehā writers wrote for a British audience, and described their experiences travelling and exploring New Zealand. A distinct New Zealand English literary culture only emerged in the early 20th century, initially with works inspired by Māori traditions and legends. Some New Zealand writers began to build a reputation, most notably short-story writer Katherine Mansfield.

From the 1940s, New Zealand literature began to develop into its own unique style, with writers such as short-story writer Frank Sargeson, novelist Janet Frame and poet Allen Curnow achieving critical and popular success in the mid-20th century. Publishing outlets for New Zealand writers such as Landfall, the New Zealand School Journal and bilingual quarterly Te Ao Hou / The New World also developed in this period. Since the mid-1950s Māori writing in New Zealand has flourished, with internationally recognised writers including poet Hone Tuwhare, novelists Alan Duff, Keri Hulme (author of the bone people (1984), the first New Zealand novel to win a Booker Prize), Patricia Grace and Witi Ihimaera, and short story writer Jacquie Sturm. New Zealand literature also has a close connection with Pasifika literature, and notable Pasifika writers include Albert Wendt, Alistair Te Ariki Campbell and Karlo Mila.

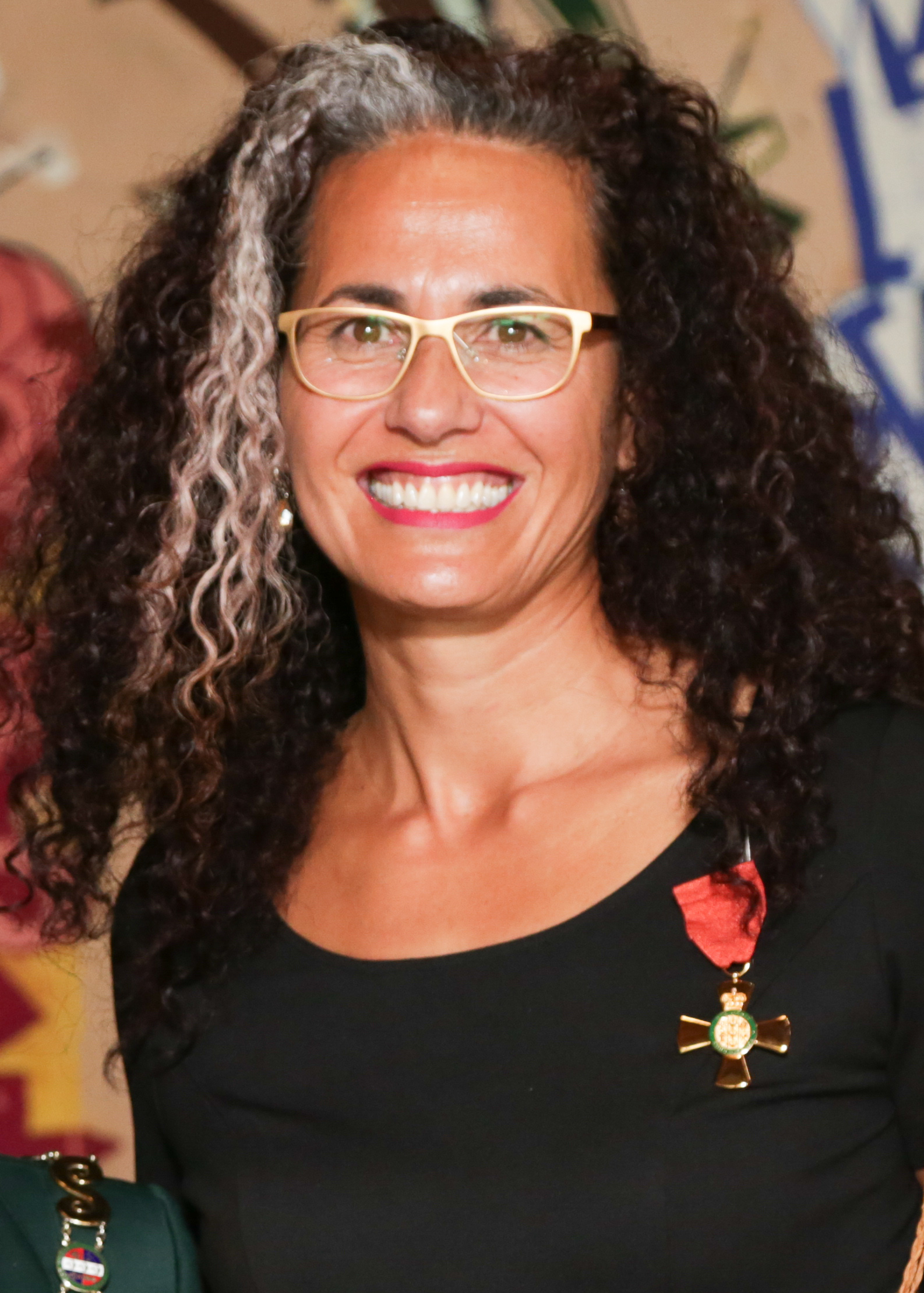
Poet Selina Tusitala Marsh, 2019

New Zealand fiction has grown exponentially since the mid-1970s, with notable contemporary novelists including Elizabeth Knox, Lloyd Jones and Eleanor Catton. Children's authors Margaret Mahy and Joy Cowley have made a significant contribution to New Zealand children's literature, and for older readers authors like Maurice Gee, Jack Lasenby and Tessa Duder have written books ranging from fantasy to social realism.

New Zealand has a strong poetic tradition; poets like James K. Baxter, Fleur Adcock and C.K. Stead emerged in the 1950s with a focus on New Zealand national identity, and were followed in later decades by poets influenced by American culture and more interested in personal relationships such as Bill Manhire, Sam Hunt and Elizabeth Smither. Modern New Zealand poetry is diverse in scope and themes, and notable contemporary poets include Tusiata Avia, Selina Tusitala Marsh and Hinemoana Baker.

== Sports ==
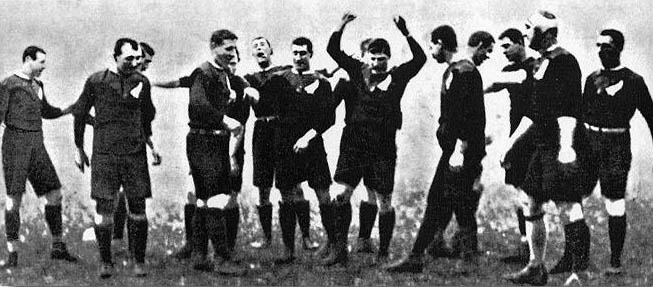
The Original All Blacks during the "haka", 1905

The sports that most New Zealanders participate in are rugby union, cricket, basketball, netball, association football (the most popular sport amongst children), rugby league and hockey. Also popular are golf, tennis, cycling and a variety of water sports, particularly sailing and rowing. The country is known for its extreme sports, adventure tourism and strong mountaineering tradition, as seen in the success of notable New Zealander Sir Edmund Hillary.

The national rugby union team is called the All Blacks and has the best winning record of any national team in the world, including being the inaugural winners of the World Cup in 1987. The style of name has been followed in naming the national team in several other sports. For instance, the nation's basketball team is known as the Tall Blacks.

Horseracing was also a popular spectator sport and became part of the "rugby, racing and beer" culture during the 1960s. Many New Zealanders either play or support their local rugby team and the All Blacks are national icons. Some have argued that rugby is a national religion.

== Religion ==
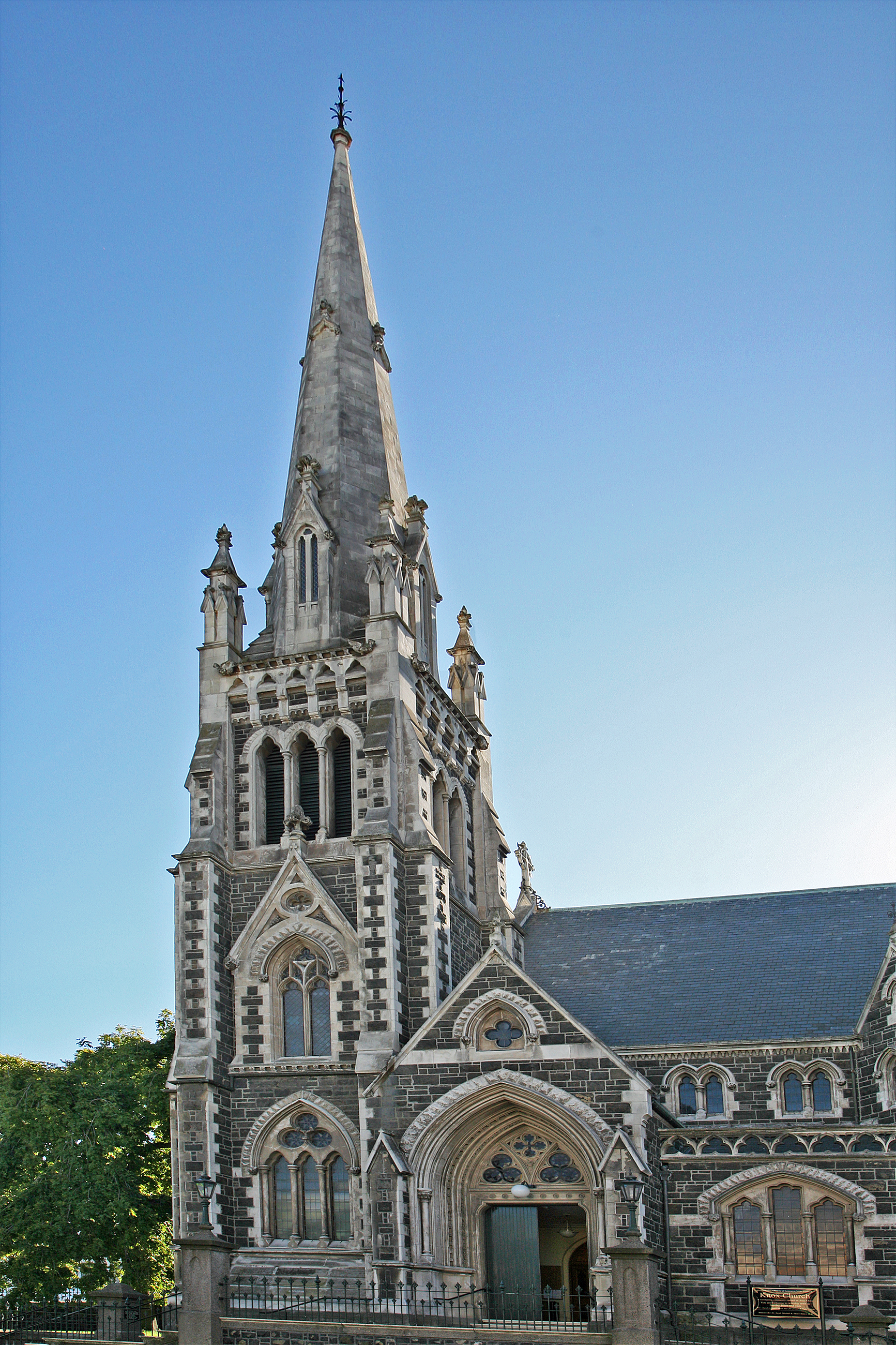
Knox Church, a Presbyterian church, in Dunedin. The city was founded by Scottish Presbyterian settlers.

Pre-colonial native Māori religion was animistic. One of its major features was tapu (sacred and/or forbidden), which was used to maintain the status of chiefs and tohunga (priests) and also for purposes such as conserving resources. Some of the earliest European settlers in New Zealand were Christian missionaries, mostly from the Church of England but also from Protestant denominations and the Catholic Church. From the 1830s onwards, large numbers of Māori converted. Throughout the 19th century a number of movements emerged which blended traditional Māori beliefs with Christianity. These included Pai Mārire, Ringatū, and in the early-20th century, Rātana. They typically centred on a prophet-leader. These churches continue to attract a substantial following; according to the 2013 census, 50,565 people are Rātana believers, and another 16,419 are Ringatū. 1,689 people stated that they followed Māori religion.

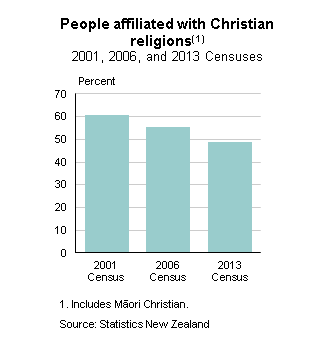
Percentages of people reporting affiliation with Christianity at the 2001, 2006 and 2013 censuses; there has been a steady decrease over twelve years.

Pākehā have become steadily less religious over the course of the 20th century. In the 1920s there was still a reasonably high level of sectarianism and anti-Catholic prejudice, but this has since died down and the major churches generally co-operate with each other. The churches and religious lobby groups have little political influence where Pākehā are concerned. The vast majority of religious Pākehā are Christian, but a small number follow non-Christian religions, particularly Buddhism. The Scottish (Presbyterian) English (Anglican) division can still be seen in the religious distribution of some cities and suburbs. It has also been evidenced that New Zealand's lack of religion correlates with income and income correlates with urban location; in Auckland, for example, the richest suburbs are the least religious. A wider range of immigrant groups in recent decades has contributed to the growth of minority religions.

According to the 2013 census, the number of people who affiliated with a Christian denomination (including Māori Christian) decreased to 1,906,398 (48.9% of all people who stated their religious affiliation), down from 2,082,942 (55.6%) in 2006. Affiliation to non-Christian religions has increased since the 2006 census. In 2013, the number of Hindus numbered 88,919, Buddhists 58,404, Muslims 46,149, and Sikhs 19,191. The number and proportion of people indicating they had no religion increased between 2006 and 2013. In 2013, 1,635,345 New Zealanders (41.9%) reported they had no religion.

== Social class ==
Until about 1980s it was often claimed that New Zealand was a classless society.

New Zealanders' egalitarianism has been criticised as discouraging and denigrating ambition and individual achievement and success. New Zealanders tend to value modesty and distrust those who talk about their own merits. They especially dislike anyone who seems to consider themselves better than others even if the person in question is demonstrably more talented or successful than others. This attitude can manifest itself in the tall poppy syndrome or crab mentality, which refer to 'cutting down' of those thought to have risen above the general mass of people.

It has been argued that in New Zealand ethnicity plays the traditional role of class, with Māori and other Polynesians earning less, having a lower standard of living and less education, and working in lower status jobs than Pākehā.

New Zealand's claims to be a classless society were dealt a fatal blow in the 1980s and 1990s by the economic reforms of the fourth Labour government and its successor, the fourth National government. A cultural shift also took place due to the economic and social impact of international capital, commerce and advertising. New Zealanders were exposed to a previously unknown array of consumer goods and franchises. Aided by overseas programming, commercial radio and TV stations enjoyed rapid growth. Local manufacturing suffered from cheap imports, with many jobs lost. These reforms led to a dramatic increase in income inequality between the richest and poorest New Zealanders, and an increase in the numbers living in poverty. Recent appreciation of real estate values increased the wealth of a generation of landowners while making housing unaffordable for many. Some are concerned that a New Zealand property bubble may burst, potentially wiping out considerable wealth.

== Travel ==
It is very common for New Zealanders to travel or live overseas for extended periods of time, often on working holidays. These are usually referred to as the 'OE' or 'overseas experience', and are most commonly taken by people in their 20s.

The OE to Europe is usually self-funded, and tends to occur a few years after university graduation, when the traveller has saved up enough for airfares and living expenses. The length of the visit can range from a few months to the remainder of the visitor's life; since many New Zealanders have British ancestry or dual citizenship (sometimes as a result of their parents' OE), the restrictions on working in Britain do not apply to a substantial percentage of them.

Since the signing of the Trans-Tasman Travel Arrangement in 1973, New Zealanders have had the right to live and work in Australia on equal terms with Australian citizens.

New Zealand has a number of reciprocal working holiday agreements, allowing people in their 20s to live and work overseas, usually for up to a year. Such agreements are in place with: Argentina, Belgium, Brazil, Canada, Chile, Czech Republic, Denmark, Finland, France, Germany, Hong Kong, Ireland, Italy, Japan, South Korea, Malaysia, Malta, Mexico, Netherlands, Norway, Singapore, Spain, Sweden, Taiwan, Thailand, the United Kingdom and Uruguay.

== National stereotypes ==
=== The Kiwi male ===
The stereotyped New Zealand male is essentially a pioneer type: he is perceived to be rural, strong, unemotional, democratic, has little time for high culture, good with animals (particularly horses) and machines, and is able to turn his hand to nearly anything. This type of man is often presumed to be a unique product of New Zealand's colonial period but he shares many similarities with the stereotypical American frontiersman and Australian bushman. New Zealand men are supposed to still have many of these qualities, even though most New Zealanders have lived in urban areas since the late-19th century. This has not prevented New Zealanders seeing themselves (and being seen) as essentially country people and good at the tasks which country life requires.

The hard man: New Zealand men have often been stereotyped as strong, unemotional and prone to violence. For many years this was seen as a good thing, and was best embodied by All Black Colin Meads. Voted 'New Zealand player of the century' by New Zealand Rugby Monthly magazine, Meads was the second All Black to be sent off the field, and once played a match with a broken arm. Although he was known to assault other players during games, this was generally approved of as 'enforcement' of the 'spirit of the game'. He was also a supporter of sporting contact with apartheid South Africa. In recent decades the macho attitude has been both criticised and reviled as dangerous both to men who embody it and those around them. It has been blamed for New Zealand's culture of heavy drinking and its high male suicide rate. However it still has its supporters, with some commentators stating that the more recent All Blacks do not have enough 'mongrel'.

== Attitudes ==
=== Social conservatism and progressiveness ===
Social reforms pioneered by New Zealand include women's suffrage, the welfare state, and respect for indigenous peoples (through the Treaty of Waitangi and the Waitangi Tribunal). New Zealand was the first country to have an openly transgender mayor, and later member of parliament, Georgina Beyer. Same-sex marriage has been legal in New Zealand since 19 August 2013.

In contrast to this, New Zealand has a history of some conservative social policies. For example, from World War One until 1967 pubs were required by law to close at 6pm.

The 1981 South African rugby tour in New Zealand inspired protests demanding that the South African team's games be cancelled, while some rugby supporters opposed this.

=== Attitudes to authority ===
In general, New Zealanders have faith in their democracy. New Zealand is perceived to have very low levels of corruption although some question whether those perceptions are entirely warranted. Turnout for parliamentary general elections is typically above 80%, which is very high by international standards and occurs despite the absence of any law requiring citizens to vote. However local government elections have much lower turnout figures, with an average of 53% in 2007.

New Zealanders, both those of Pākehā and Māori roots, have been described as an individualistic people, who take intrusion very personally, especially when it occurs onto private land (but also sometimes in a wider sense). According to psychologists, this is rooted respectively in the 'frontier' image of the European settler culture, but also mirrored amongst the Māori, for whom land holds a lot of spiritual value in addition to its commercial use.

=== Attitudes to multiculturalism ===
New Zealand has for most of its modern history been an isolated bicultural society. In recent decades an increasing number of immigrants has changed the demographic spectra. In the larger cities this change has occurred suddenly and dramatically. There has been an increasing awareness of multiculturalism in New Zealand in all areas of society and also in politics. New Zealand's race relations has been a controversial topic in recent times. The political party New Zealand First has been associated with an anti-immigration policy. The Office of the Race Relations Conciliator was established by the Race Relations Act in 1971 for the purposes of "promoting positive race relations and addressing complaints of discrimination on grounds of race, colour, and ethnic or national origin", and was merged with the Human Rights Commission in January 2002.

== Food ==
=== Māori cuisine ===
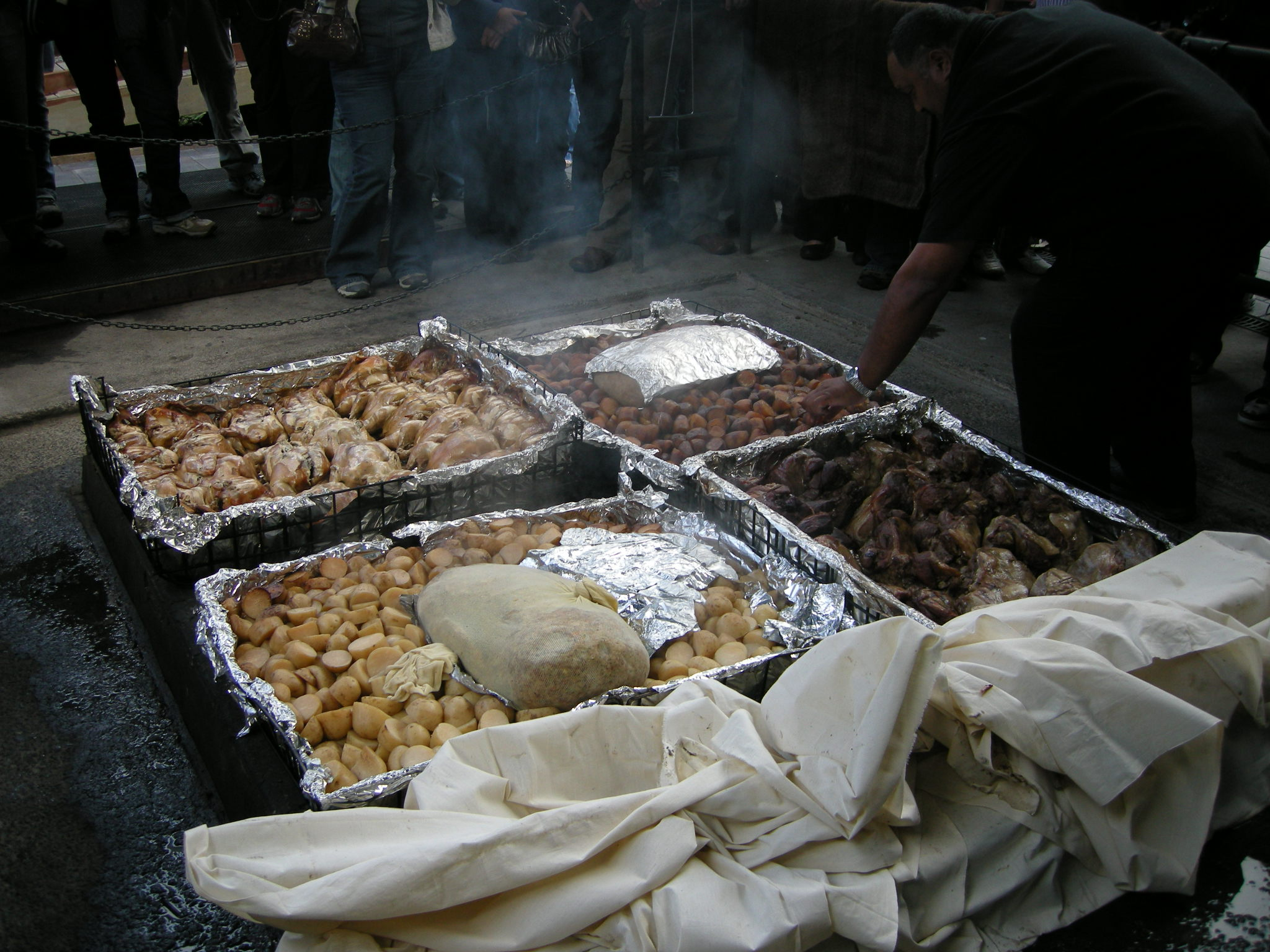
Putting down a hāngī (earth oven)

Māori cuisine was historically derived from that of tropical Polynesia, adapted for New Zealand's colder climate. Key ingredients included kūmara (sweet potato), fern root, taro, birds and fish. Food was cooked in hāngī (earth ovens) and roasted, and in geothermal areas was boiled or steamed using natural hot springs and pools. Various means of preserving birds and other foods were also employed. Before the arrival of European settlers, Māori did not drink alcoholic beverages.

Following the arrival of British settlers, the Māori adopted many of their foods, especially pork and potatoes, the latter of which transformed the Māori agricultural economy. Many traditional food sources became scarce as introduced predators dramatically reduced bird populations, and forests were cleared for farming and timber. Traditional seafoods such as toheroa and whitebait were over-harvested. Present day Māori cuisine is a mixture of Māori tradition, 19th century British cookery, and contemporary dishes. In everyday life the two foods of Māori origin are "the boil up" (meat and vegetables boiled in a broth and sometimes thickened with flour), and the hāngī which is associated with special occasions.

=== Pākehā cuisine ===
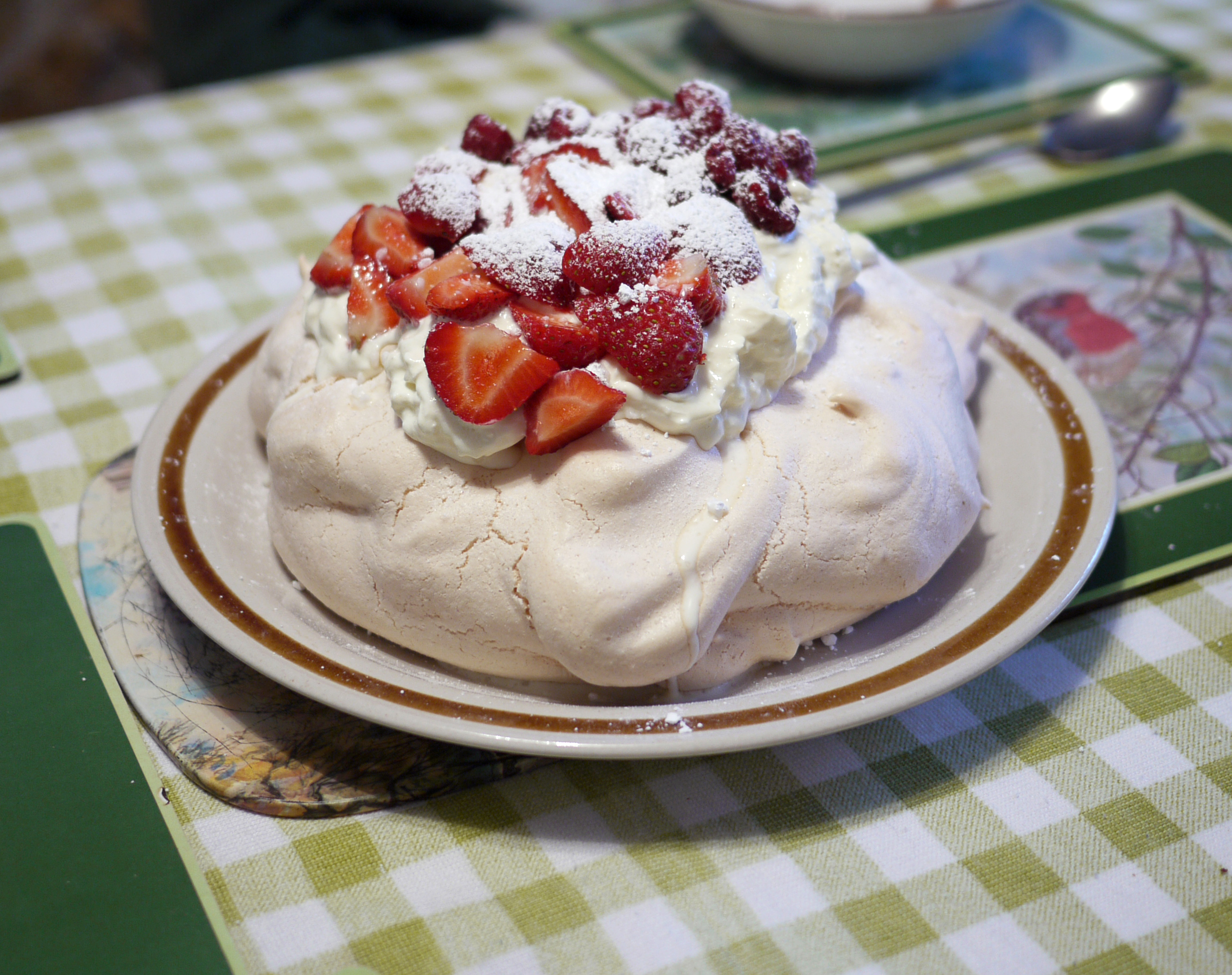
Pavlova, a popular New Zealand dessert, garnished with cream and strawberries

Since the majority of Pākehā are of British descent, Pākehā cuisine is heavily influenced by British cuisine.

In recent decades international cuisine, including Chinese and Indian, has become popular, and as in many other countries 'foodie' culture has emerged. New Zealand chefs such as Peter Gordon played a part in the creation of fusion cuisine.

Café culture has grown to be a major element of New Zealand cuisine. Cafés and a high standard of espresso coffee making have become common throughout the country.

== See also ==
- Ministry for Culture and Heritage
- Demographics of New Zealand
- LGBT in New Zealand
- Public holidays in New Zealand
- Christmas in New Zealand
- Culture of Auckland
- Culture of Australia
- Etiquette in Australia and New Zealand
