= List of New Zealand art awards =

A list of New Zealand art awards and residencies.

== Current awards ==
Award	Established	Frequency	Awarded by	Notes	References
Adam Portraiture Award	2002	Biennial	The New Zealand Portrait Gallery with the Adam Foundation	National prize for painted portraiture. $20,000 for winner, $2,500 for runner up. Winning entry goes to the New Zealand Portrait Gallery for their collection.	
Fair Trust Art Prize	2024	Annual	The Eileen Fair Charitable Trust	$40,000 to develop a new body of work, plus up to $10,000 reimbursement for art materials	
Fieldays No. 8 Wire National Art Award			New Zealand National Agricultural Fieldays	A national competition where entrants create a sculptural art piece out of No.8 wire. The award has a total prize pool of $10,000.	
Glaister Ennor Graduate Art Awards	2006	Annual	Sanderson Contemporary Art Gallery	Auckland art schools nominate their top honours and masters students for an exhibition at Sanderson Contemporary Art Gallery, where a winner is selected.	
Governor-General's Award	?	Periodic	New Zealand Academy of Fine Arts	Awarded to an artist who is a member of the New Zealand Academy of Fine Arts, and who has made a significant contribution to the arts in New Zealand over an extended period of time.	
Hibiscus and Bays Art Award	2012?	Annual?	Mairangi Arts Centre	The purpose of the awards exhibition is to celebrate and foster artistic and creative practices in New Zealand. Submissions are open to all New Zealand residents and open to all artforms and mediums, including photography. Exhibitors will be selected by a panel of respected arts professionals, and winners will be awarded with monetary prizes as well as a group exhibition the following year at Mairangi Arts Centre.	
Kiingi Tuheitia Portraiture Award	2021	Biennial	New Zealand Portrait Gallery in partnership with the Office of the Kīngitanga	$20,000 for winner, $2,500 for runner up. Named for Kiingi Tuheitia. Awarded to artists for portraiture of their Māori ancestors (tūpuna).	
Lysaght Watt Trust Art Award	2013	Annual	Lysaght Watt Trust	A different theme is selected annually.	
Molly Morpeth Canaday Art Award	1986	Annual	Arts Whakatāne and Whakatāne Museum and Arts	Presented by Arts Whakatāne and exhibition partner Te Kōputu a te whanga a Toi - Whakatāne Library and Exhibition Centre, this annual non-acquisitive award is dedicated to excellence across all art forms within contemporary fine art practice in Aotearoa, New Zealand. Prize pool of over $25,000.	
National Contemporary Art Award	2000	Annual	Waikato Society of Arts from 2000 - 2006. then Waikato Museum Te Whare Taonga o Waikato from 2007 onward	The National Contemporary Art Award was initiated and administered by the Waikato Society of Arts (WSA). Except the inaugural award, the exhibition has always been held at either Artspost and or Waikato Museum. In 2006, the award had grown to the extent that the WSA decided it would be more feasible for the administration of the award to be continued by Waikato Museum. Formerly known as Trust Waikato National Contemporary Art Award and Bold Horizon National Contemporary Art Award, the award is now known as the National Contemporary Art Award. Trust Waikato were sponsors until 2009. 2020 was the very first year that the award has ever been cancelled. The cancellation was due to global COVID-19 pandemic lockdown which meant that the award was not able to proceed in time. The 2020 judge was to be Karl Chitham, Director of the Dowse Art Museum, Wellington. Chitham will now be the 2021 art award judge.	
National Drawing Award	2004, 2006, 2009			New Zealand's leading independent contemporary art spaces, ARTSPACE, Auckland and The Physics Room, Christchurch and Enjoy Public Art Gallery, Wellington.	
National Youth Art Award	2009	Annual	Waikato Society of Arts	Open to entries from all New Zealand artists aged 15–25. Prize pool of $6000.	
New Zealand Painting and Printing Art Award	2000	Annual	Waikato Society of Arts	The $15,000 prize is donated to the Waikato Society of Arts by the Philip Vela Family Trust, who in addition, purchase the winning work.	
North Shore City Art Award				The competition is for a two dimensional work relating to the coastline, coastal settlement, flora, fauna, the sea, marine life, or maritime activity. (may have become the Hibiscus and Bays Art Award).	
Parkin Drawing Prize	2013	Annual	Chris Parkin	A national award and an annual exhibition, held at the New Zealand Academy of Fine Arts. Prize of $20,000.	
Pat Hanly Creativity Awards	2002		Auckland Art Gallery	For secondary school students, as nominated by heads of departments and art teachers.	
People's Choice Award		Annual	Christchurch Art Show		
Peters Doig Marlborough Art Awards	2012?	Annual		Last awarded 2016?	
Portage Ceramic Awards	2001	Annual	Te Uru Waitakere Contemporary Gallery	Founded by Lopdell House Gallery, which since 2014 has been known as Te Uru. Since the third award onwards the judge has selected a group of finalists for exhibition. An exhibition is held at Te Uru and a publication produced. The award has included residencies on occasion. There was no award in 2020 due to the Covid-19 pandemic, instead a 20-year survey was presented at Te Uru.	
Rydal Art Prize	2017	Biennial	Seeds Trust	A work considered by a jury nominated by Te Uru Waitakere Contemporary Gallery to have made an important contribution during the year of judging to NZ painting practice.	
Taranaki National Art Awards	2001	Annual		A national competition offering an opportunity for artists to exhibit and sell their artwork, with a $12,000 prize pool. All entries are displayed in an exhibition at Sandfords Events Centre, which coincides with the Taranaki Rhododendron Festival.	
Tui McLauchlan Emerging Artist's Award	2013		Tui McLauchlan Art Award Trust	Named for Tui McLauchlan	
Waiheke Walker and Hall Art Award		Annual	Waiheke Community Art Gallery	A national award for two dimensional works in any medium, with a prize of $5000 as the Premier award.	
The Trusts Art, Sculpture and Photography Awards					
Wai Art Portrait Awards					
Wallace Art Awards	1992	Annual	Wallace Arts Trust	Awards for contemporary painting, sculpture, drawing and unique photography to encourage the visual arts in New Zealand. Value of over $275,000.	
Walters Prize	2002	Biennial	Auckland Art Gallery	The $50,000 Walters Prize is awarded for an outstanding contribution to contemporary art in New Zealand.	
World of Wearable Arts	1987	Anual	WOW	International awards for wearable arts in six categories.	
Patillo Arts Review/Whanganui Arts Review		Annual	Sarjeant Gallery	Open to any artist, working in any media in the Whanganui region, including Ruapehu and Rangitikei and all areas that link to the Whanganui River.	
Splash		Annual	Watercolour New Zealand	Entry is open to all members of Watercolour New Zealand. Open theme. Unclear what the prize is.	

== Residencies ==
Residency	Established	Frequency	Awarded by	Notes	References
Frances Hodgkins Fellowship	1962	Annual	University of Otago	The residency was created 'to encourage painters and sculptors in the practice and advancement of their art, to associate them with life in the University, and at the same time to foster an interest in the arts within the University.'	
Olivia Spencer Bower Award	1987	Annual	The Olivia Spencer Bower Foundation	To encourage and promote emerging New Zealand artists and sculptors. It was Olivia's specific objective to assist artists and sculptors with talent so they could devote their energies, on a full-time basis for a twelve-month period, to painting and sculpture freed from the necessity to seek outside employment.	
Portage Ceramic Awards	2001	Annual	Te Uru Waitakere Contemporary Gallery	Since the third award onwards the judge has selected a group of finalists for exhibition. An exhibition is held at Te Uru and a publication produced. The award has included residencies on occasion.	
Tylee Cottage Residency	1966	Annual	Sarjeant Gallery	Each year, the selected artist works full-time on their work for 2–12 months and resides in Tylee Cottage	

== Past awards ==
Award	Established	Dissolved	Frequency	Awarded by	Notes	References
Benson & Hedges Art Awards	1969	1980s			Defunct.	
CoCA Anthony Harper Contemporary Art Award	2003	2009	Annual	CoCA	No record of winner after 2009	
Cranleigh Barton Drawing Award	1993	2003	Biennial	Christchurch Art Gallery	Recognised excellence in drawing and to raise its status within visual arts education and practice. Last awarded 2003?	
Kelliher Art Prize	1956	1977	Annual		For ‘a realistic natural representation’ of a typical New Zealand landscape; first contested at the Auckland City Gallery in 1956 and was an annual event in the Academy Gallery until 1970.	
National Bank Art Awards	1958	1980			Now defunct.	
Visa Gold Art Award	1991	1998	Annual			
