= Adam Portraiture Award =

New Zealand art award

The New Zealand Portrait Gallery Te Pūkenga Whakaata hosts the biennial Adam Portraiture Award competition, New Zealand's premier portrait prize. The first competition was held in 2000 as the National Portrait Competition, and since 2002 has been funded by the Adam Foundation. Since 2006, the winning entry has become part of the Gallery's permanent collection.

== Winners ==
Year	Artist	Winning work
2022	Jessica Gurnsey	Lady Day
2020	Sacha Lees	Sometimes an outline coloured in
2018	Logan Moffat	Elam
2016	Andre Bronnimann	Sisters
2014	Henry Christian Slane	Tim
2012	Stephen Martyn Welch	3 Nights, A Mirror & Loads Of Coffee
2010	Harriet Bright	Kayte
2008	Irene Ferguson	The Blue Girl (Johanna Sanders in her back yard)
2006	Freeman White	Portrait of Hans
2004	Ryuzo Nishida	Self Portrait
2002	Marianne Muggeridge	Meren and Josie
2000	Marianne Muggeridge	Lucy in her Green Dress
