= Irene Ferguson =

New Zealand painter

Irene Ferguson (born 1970) is a New Zealand artist best known for her portrait paintings. Ferguson was awarded the New Zealand Portraiture Award in 2008.

== Training and experience ==
Ferguson was born in Hokitika. She gained a Diploma of Fine Arts with Honours from Otago School of Fine Art in Dunedin in 1993 and a Master of Fine Arts from the New York Academy of Art in 2005. From 2005 to 2006 Ferguson lived and worked in New York City. In 2010 she travelled to Italy to complete training in portraiture at the Charles H. Cecil Studios in Florence, Italy.

== Fellowships and residencies ==
In 2002 Ferguson was awarded the William Hodges Fellowship residency by the Southland Art Foundation. In 2008 Ferguson was the Artist in Residence at Samuel Marsden Collegiate School, Wellington.

== Awards ==
- In 2008 Ferguson won the New Zealand Portrait Gallery Adam Portraiture Award with The Blue Girl, Johanna Sanders in her Back Yard.
- In 2006 she was a finalist in the BP Portrait Award at the National Portrait Gallery, London.

== Artist residencies ==
- 1996 The Southland Art Foundation 'Artist in Residence' programme
- 2002 William Hodges Fellowship
- 2008 Artist in Residence at Samuel Marsden Collegiate School, Wellington.

== Exhibitions ==
=== Solo ===
- 2012 Colossal, {Suite} Gallery, Wellington, New Zealand
- 2011 Torrid Grey, Aratoi – Wairarapa Museum of Art & History, Masterton, New Zealand
- 2010 Pine, {Suite} Gallery, Wellington, New Zealand
- 2008 Wayward, Janne Land Gallery, Wellington, New Zealand
- 2003 sample; flesh and blood, Janne Land Gallery, Wellington, New Zealand
- 2003 sample; flesh and blood, Southland Museum and Art Gallery, Invercargill, New Zealand

=== Group ===
- 2013–14 The Parkin Drawing Prize
- 2013 Runner up, The 7th International Drawing Biennale, The Polish Art Foundation, Melbourne, Australia
- 2008 Strive Towards Your Destiny, group show, Hirschfeld Gallery, Wellington
- 2006 BP Portrait Award, National Portrait Gallery, London.

== Work in collections ==
Ferguson's work is predominately held within New Zealand collections.

- James Wallace Art Trust, Auckland, New Zealand
- The New Zealand Portrait Gallery, Wellington, New Zealand
- Southland Art Foundation, Invercargill, New Zealand
- Southland Museum and Art Gallery, Invercargill, New Zealand

== Reviews and writing ==
- 2010 Mark Amery reviews portraiture from the Adam Portrait Award show.
- 2008 Strive Towards Your Destiny, group show, Hirschfeld Gallery, Wellington. Review by Jessica Scott, City Gallery Wellington.
- 2003 "sample; flesh and blood", Jane Land Gallery, Wellington. Reviewed in Art New Zealand, 2003.
- 2003 Music and Braille, Peter Rae Gallery, Dunedin. Reviewed by Penny Hunt, Art New Zealand, Issue 109, 2003
