= Sacha Lees =

New Zealand artist

- Born: 1977 (age 48–49); Greymouth, New Zealand
- Education: Christchurch Polytechnic, Angel Academy of Art, Massey University
- Known for: Contemporary Art and Portraiture
- Style: Contemporary Art, Baroque
- Awards: Adam Portraiture Award (2020)
- Website: sachalees.co.nz

Sacha Lees(born 1977) is a New Zealand contemporary artist whose materially engaged oil painting practice explores the entanglements of identity, power, and body anxiety within womanhood. Informed by feminist theory, her work uses her own body as both a site of resistance and a symbol of societal control. Her practice combines classical painting techniques with processes of material transformation, including bodily imprinting onto reclaimed copper and the manipulation of painted measuring tapes. Drawing on Baroque art and visual traditions, Lees reworks historical representations of the feminine body to examine contemporary structures of gender, value, and power. Art historian, curator and writer Dr Kirsty Baker has described Lees' practice as distorting "the representative frame that has long sought to contain and constrain women."

== Training and career ==
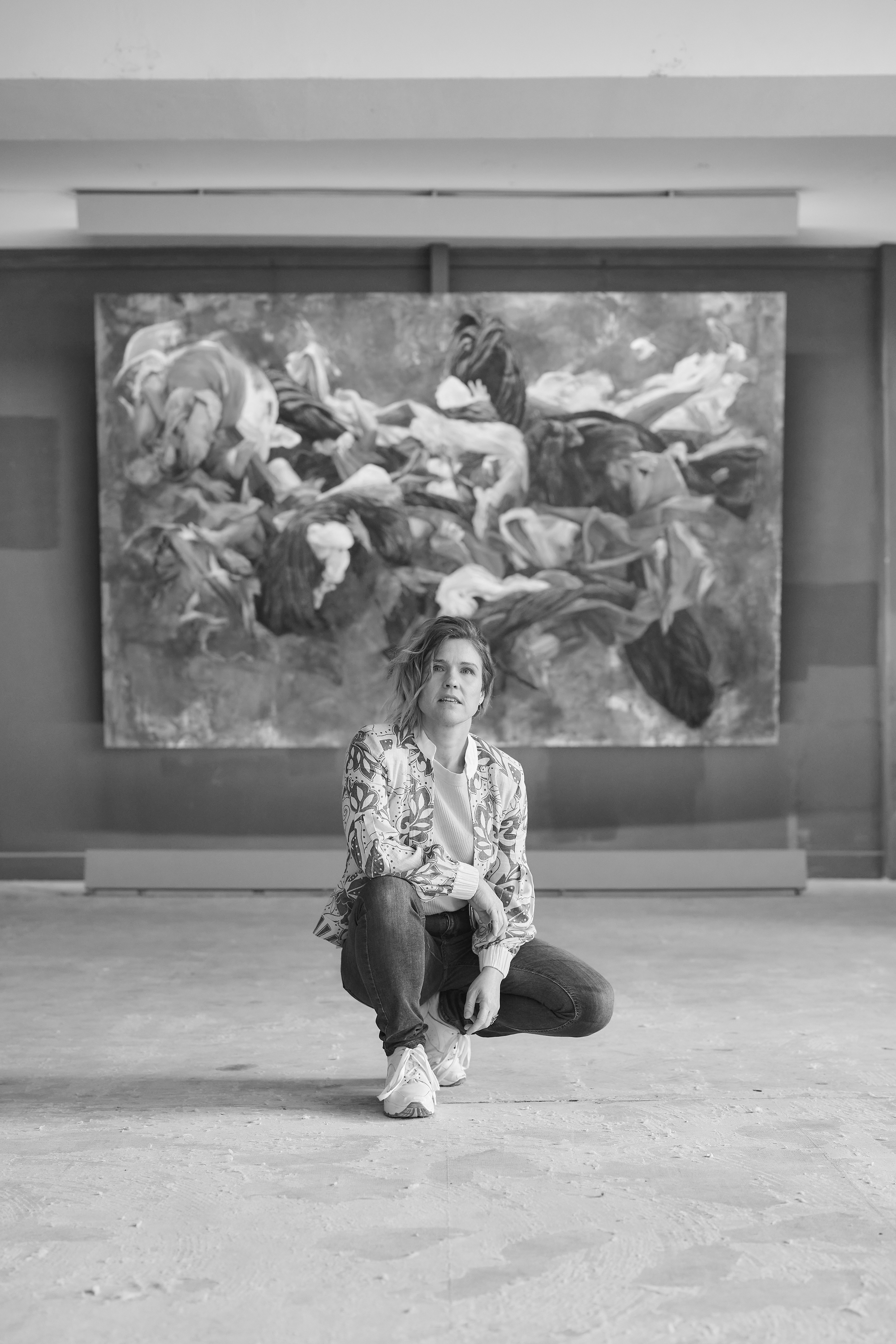
Contemporary Artist, Sacha Lees in front of her painting 'Cassandra'. Photography credit: Amber-Jayne Bain.

Lees was born in Greymouth and grew up in Kumara, on the West Coast of New Zealand's South Island. Her early training in art, figure drawing and visual communication took place in Christchurch at Hagley Community College and Christchurch Polytechnic.

Between 1997 and 2004 she worked at Weta Workshop in Wellington as a creature designer and illustrator, model maker, sculptor and airbrush artist on Sir Peter Jackson's The Lord of the Rings film trilogy. She also designed commercial merchandise for the productions. Her hands, in make-up, were used to portray Gollum's hands in a scene from The Fellowship of the Ring.

Lees subsequently spent a year studying old master art techniques in Florence, Italy. On her return to New Zealand, she applied these skills to the development of her painting practice through portraiture and other commissions.

In December 2010, Lees was included in the exhibition White Cloud Worlds at the Dowse Art Museum in Lower Hutt, and in the book of the same name published in 2011. The exhibition and book showcased fantasy and science-fiction art by New Zealand artists and were curated by Paul Tobin and Kate Jorgensen. Lees subsequently featured in two further volumes of White Cloud Worlds and associated exhibitions in Wellington and Upper Hutt between 2012 and 2017.

In 2024, Lees completed her Master of Fine Arts studies at Te Kunenga ki Pūrehuroa | Massey University, and in 2025 was awarded the degree with First Class Honours. Her thesis, Profane Baroque and a Woman's Experience, examined gender inequities and the representation of women in art, drawing on feminist theory and the work of artists including Jenny Saville and Jacqueline Fahey.

In 2025, Lees was commissioned by The Northern Club in Auckland to paint a portrait of King Charles III. The portrait was painted in oils on canvas board and forms part of the club's collection.

In 2025, Lees exhibited Cassandra (2024), painted in oils on reclaimed copper-clad laminate, in Wing and a Prayer at the Dowse Art Museum. The exhibition ran from October 2025 to March 2026 and included work by five artists exploring relationships between faith, material culture and the transformation of discarded materials into forms of significance.

In 2026, following the completion of her postgraduate studies, Lees presented [Un]becoming at Page Galleries in Wellington. The exhibition marked a shift in her painting practice, bringing together reclaimed copper and painted measuring tapes with fragmented representations of the body and Baroque-inspired imagery. Page Galleries described the exhibition as exploring the body through fragmented and partial forms, with paintings made on the surfaces of copper and measuring tapes. Art historian and curator Dr Kirsty Baker wrote that the bodies in the works "refuse to yield to legibility" and described the exhibition's subject as "coming undone". The exhibition ran from 30 July to 22 August 2026, with works from the exhibition recorded as sold by Page Galleries.

In September 2026, arts critic and broadcaster Mark Amery included Lees in his feature "10 New Zealand artists to invest in right now", published in the New Zealand Listener on 3 September 2026. Amery discussed the feminist and deconstructive concerns of Lees' work and its treatment of the female body in relation to its historical representation in art. He wrote that "the female body as object in art history is coming apart" and described Lees' work as "liberating the body from inspection".

== Adam Portraiture Award ==
Lees has been a finalist in the Adam Portraiture Award three times. In 2012 she entered with a portrait of New Zealand celebrity chef Peter Gordon. In 2020, she won the Adam Portraiture Award with her self-portrait entitled Sometimes an Outline Coloured In. The judges described Lees as “ruthless in her self-scrutiny”. The work was noted for its psychological intensity and formal innovation; one curator observed that Lees “expands on the depiction of the artist at work as she seemingly fills in her own image before our eyes,” highlighting her exploration of the unfinished as a conceptual tool. In 2022 she was Highly Commended and won the People's Choice award with See me, a portrait of her daughter. In 2026, Lees received an Honourable Mention from artist and judge Jude Rae in the Adam Portrait Award for Made-to-Measure, a self-portrait constructed from woven, painted soft measuring tapes. The work was also runner-up in the People's Choice Award. The 2026 exhibition received more than 3,500 People's Choice votes, and the finalist exhibition subsequently toured nationally.

== Commercial art ==
Lees has been commissioned several times by New Zealand Post to design special commemorative editions of stamps and coins. She has designed two separate editions of stamps featuring The Lord of the Rings, the first in 2002-03, and the second in 2021 marking the 20th anniversary of the release of The Fellowship of the Ring. Alongside the 2021 stamps, Lees also designed sets of Lord of the Rings commemorative silver coins. The following year, Lees was again commissioned by New Zealand Post to design five commemorative gold and silver coins for the Platinum Jubilee of Queen Elizabeth II. Design of the 2023 New Zealand Annual Coin - Native Bee - Ngaro Huruhuru. In 2025 Lees illustrated and designed a special 2025 Round Kiwi addition stamp series celebrating Aotearoa New Zealand’s unique national bird, the kiwi.

== Exhibitions ==
=== Solo ===
- 2015 Assimilate, Exhibitions Gallery, Wellington
- 2017 Vagrant Mind, Exhibitions Gallery, Wellington
- 2020 Embracing Shadows, Artbay Gallery, Queenstown
- 2026 [Un]becoming, Page Galleries, Wellington

=== Group ===
- 2011 White Cloud Worlds, Dowse Art Museum, Lower Hutt, Wellington
- 2012 White Cloud Worlds, Lopdell House, Auckland; Museum of Art and History, Rotorua; Waikato Museum of Art and History, Hamilton; Rona Gallery, Wellington
- 2012 Villains and Assassins, Strychnin Gallery, Berlin
- 2013 Adam Portrait Exhibition Tour: New Zealand Portrait Gallery, Wellington; Lopdell House, Auckland; Percy Thomson Gallery, Stratford; Millenium Gallery, Blenheim; The Sute, Nelson; Eastern Southland Gallery, Gore
- 2015 The Creatives, Puke Ariki Museum, New Plymouth
- 2015 White Cloud Worlds, Academy of Fine Arts, Wellington
- 2020 Adam Portrait Award, New Zealand Portrait Gallery, Wellington
- 2022 Perspective, Exhibitions Gallery, Wellington
- 2022-2023 Adam Portrait Exhibition Tour: Millenium Gallery, Blenheim; Percy Thomson Gallery, Stratford; Wallace Arts Centre, Auckland
- 2025 Me: Artists Paint Themselves, New Zealand Portrait Gallery, Wellington.
- 2025 Wing and a Prayer, The Dowse Art Museum, Wellington.
- 2026 Aspiring Art Prize, Wanaka.

== Publications ==
Works by Sacha Lees have been published in the following books:

- 2002 The Lord of the Rings – The Art of 'The Fellowship of the Ring'
- 2003 The Lord of the Rings – The Art of 'The Two Towers'
- 2004 The Art of ‘The Lord of the Rings'
- 2008 Spectrum 15 – The Best in Contemporary Fantastic Art
- 2009 Spectrum 16 – The Best in Contemporary Fantastic Art
- 2010 Spectrum 17 – The Best in Contemporary Fantastic Art
- 2011 White Cloud Worlds, volume 1
- 2012 White Cloud Worlds, volume 2
- 2012 Spectrum 19 – The Best in Contemporary Fantastic Art
- 2015 White Cloud Worlds, volume 3
- 2015 Women of Wonder - The Best of Women in Contemporary Fantastic Art
- 2026 The Listener Magazine - 10 New Zealand artists to invest in right now.
