= Spotswood College =

Location
- South Road, New Plymouth, Taranaki, New Zealand; 39.0710°S 174.0371°E

Information
- Type: State co-educational secondary, years 9–13
- Motto: High Endeavour
- Established: 1960
- Ministry of Education Institution no.: 173
- Principal: Mrs. Nicola Ngarewa
- Enrolment: 936 (July 2026)
- Socio-economic decile: 5M
- Website: spotswoodcollege.school.nz

Spotswood College is a co-educational state secondary school in Spotswood, New Plymouth, New Zealand. It was founded in 1960 and celebrated its 50th Jubilee in 2010. It was formerly New Zealand's largest school.

It is New Plymouth's only co-educational secondary school, with a current roll of 936 students.

== Houses ==
Spotswood College initially had four houses. In 1969, when the college expanded the education department split the college into two schools, one named East, the other West. In 1980 the college reverted to its original structure and the four house system was re-introduced. The houses were named after the original settlers of New Plymouth. In 2012, the houses were given dual names with the original names added. The house names are based from the Sugar Loaf Islands off the coast of New Plymouth.

1960–1968 and 2012–present

- Mikotahi
- Moturoa
- Motumahanga
- Paritutu

1969–1979

- East
- West

1980–2012

- Darnell
- Atkinson
- Barrett
- Richmond

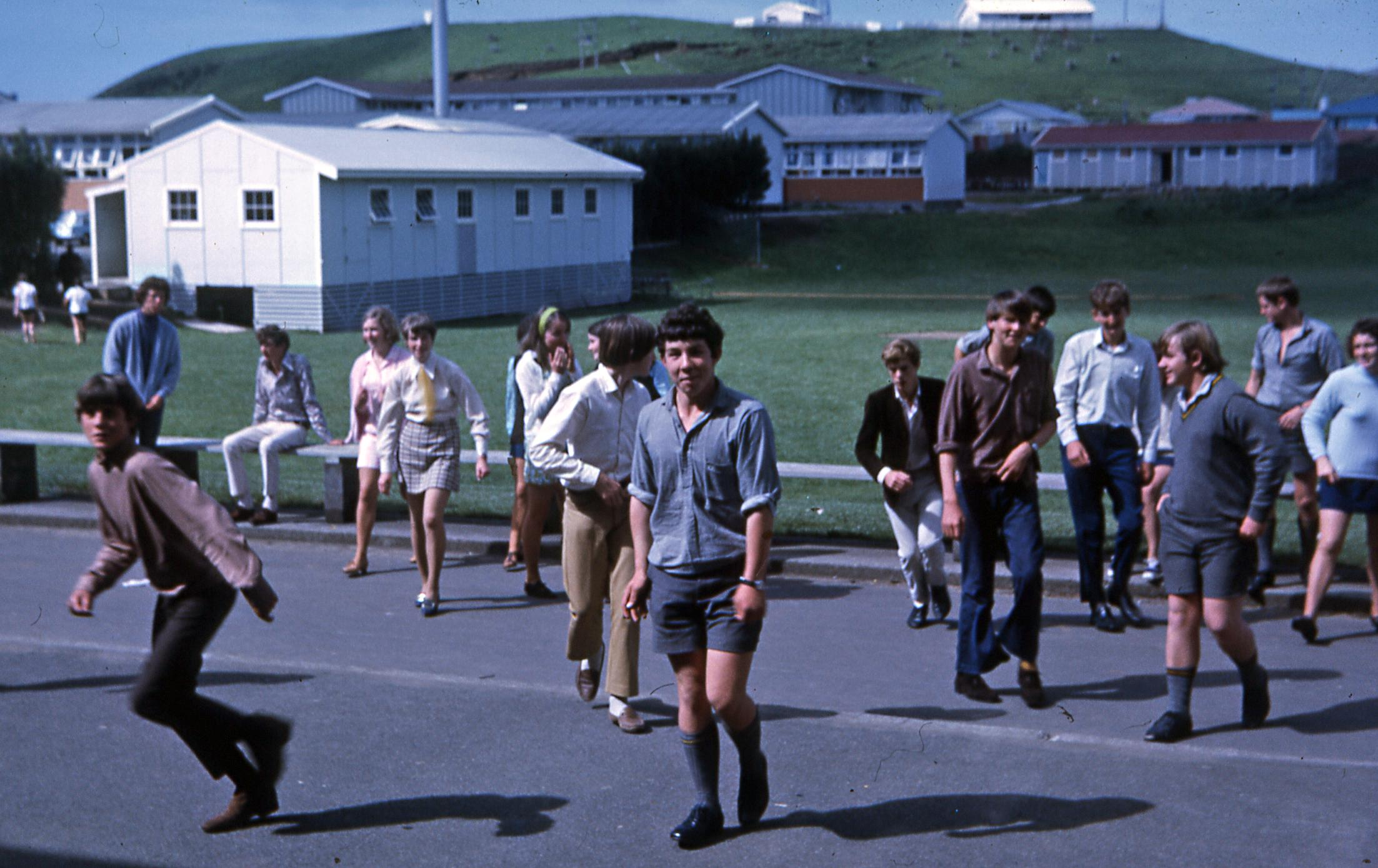
Spotswood College in 1969

== International ==
Spotswood College has hosted international students from Italy, Germany, Brazil, Japan, Italy, USA, China, Russia, New Caledonia, Sweden, Switzerland and Thailand. It has specific facilities and staff members to support them during their time in New Zealand.

In 2009, 22 students from Spotswood College's kapa haka group Te Kura Tuarua O Ngamotu were chosen to represent New Zealand at the tenth annual Te Manahua Maori cultural competition in Laie, Hawaii.

In 2013, Spotswood College provided students learning Japanese the opportunity to visit their sister school Hatsukaichi Senior High School in Hiroshima, Japan. In exchange, 8 students and 1 teacher from Hatsukaichi Senior High School visited Spotswood College and were hosted by local families.

Classes and groups from Spotswood College have also visited Japan, New Caledonia, Argentina, Vietnam, Cambodia, Thailand, United Kingdom, Greece and Italy.

== Sister school ==
- Hatsukaichi Senior High School in Hiroshima, Japan
- Colegio Sagrada Familia PJO https://fundacionpjo.es/ Valencia, Spain

== Paritutu tragedy ==
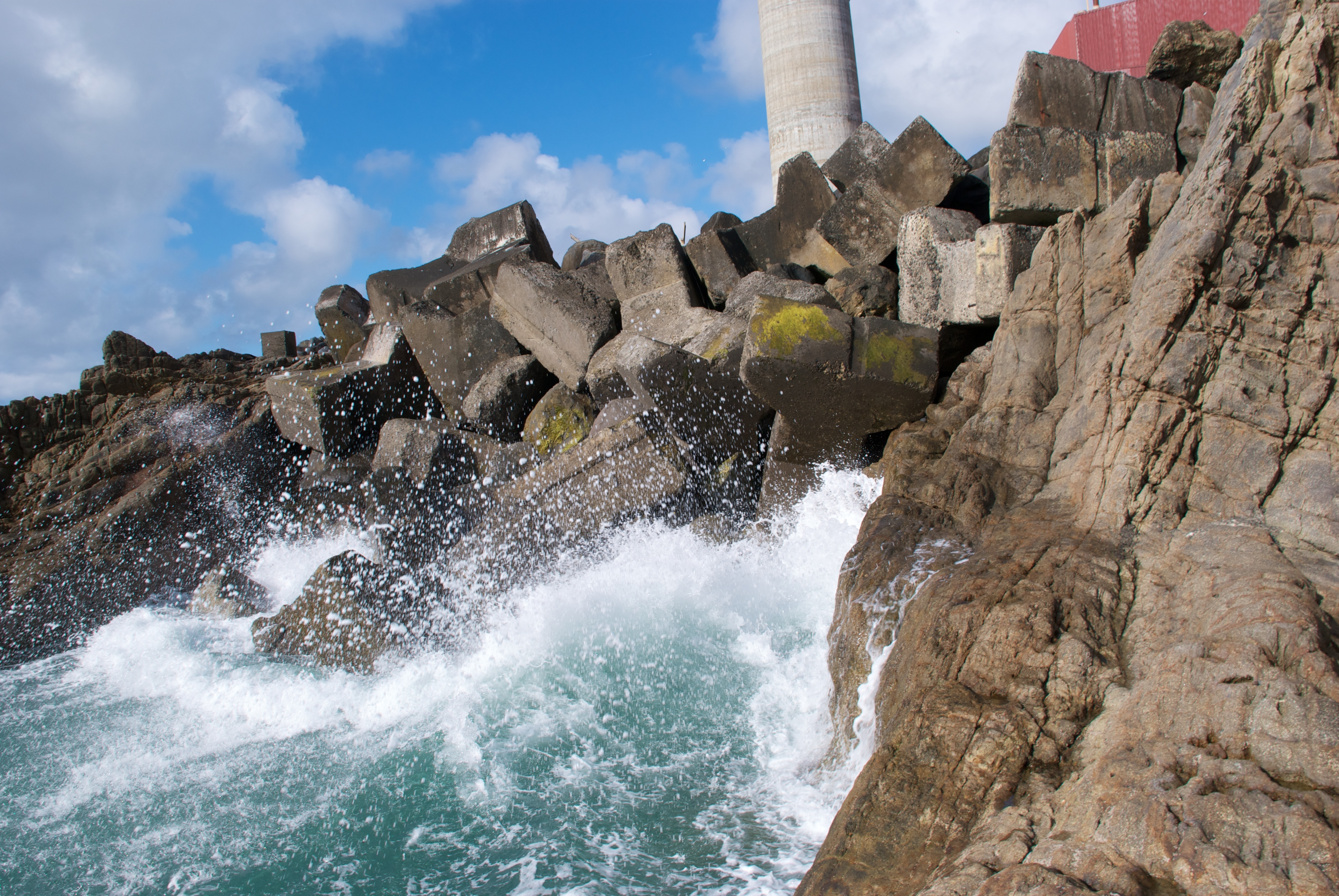
The base of Paritutu Rock

On 8 August 2012, Spotswood College students Stephen Kahukaka-Gedye and Felipe Melo, both 17, and their Taranaki Outdoor Pursuits and Education Centre (TOPEC) instructor Bryce Jourdain, 42, were swept out to sea while climbing around Paritutu rock as part of a TOPEC camp activity. The body of Felipe Melo was later found and identified. The bodies of Bryce and Stephen were never found.

TOPEC pleaded guilty to three charges. A fourth was dropped. TOPEC was charged $250,000 for the incident. TOPEC still runs camps and activities for secondary schools around the Taranaki region, however Spotswood College have never held camps with TOPEC since the incident. Spotswood College now has a stone monument in memory of them outside the entrance of the college.

== Principals ==
- Mr Alex L McPhail (1960–1977)
- Mr Evan. E Thomas (1978–1987)
- Mr Barry P Finch (1987–2002)
- Mr Graeme McFadyen (2003–2009)
- Mr. Mark A. Bowden (2010–2018)
- Mrs. Nicola Ngarewa (2018–present)

In mid 2018, it was announced that Mr. Mark Bowden would be retiring from his position as Principal at the end of term two. After a selection process, the Board of Trustees selected former Patea Area School Principal Nicola Ngarewa to take over the position at the beginning of term four, and become the school's first female principal. Mr. Daryn Shaw became acting principal for the entirety of term three while Mrs Ngarewa transitioned from Patea Area School.

== Notable staff and alumni ==
=== Staff ===
- Link Abrams-American born-basketball player, taught maths.
- Peter Jefferies — music teacher, musician
- Bali Haque

=== Alumni ===
- Liz Craig — current Member of Parliament
- Mark Crysell — former TVNZ Europe correspondent and current Sunday reporter
- Harry Duynhoven — former Mayor of New Plymouth, Member of Parliament for New Plymouth, and current New Plymouth Councillor
- Marianne Muggeridge — painter and screenprinter
- Willie Talau — rugby league player
