= Marianne Muggeridge =

New Zealand painter and screenprinter

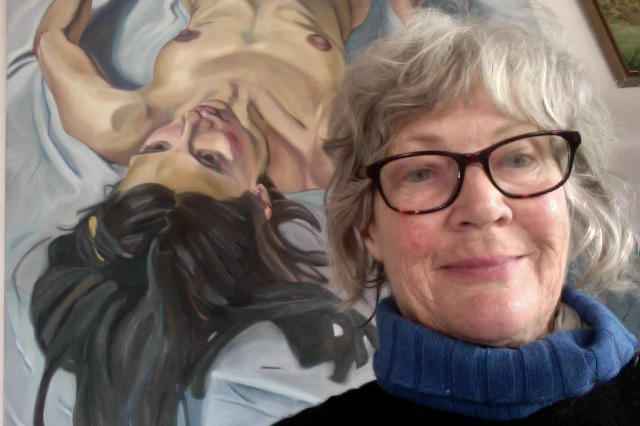
- Born: 1952 (age 73–74); Hamilton, New Zealand

Marianne Muggeridge (born 1952) is a New Zealand painter and screenprinter based in Taranaki. She is best known for portraits of notable New Zealanders, cityscapes and landscapes.

== Early life ==
Muggeridge was born in Hamilton, New Zealand in 1952. As a child, her family moved to Taranaki, where they lived in Alton, Ōpunake and New Plymouth. She is of English and Irish ancestry.

== Education ==
Muggeridge attended Spotswood College in New Plymouth and later Elam School of Fine Arts in Auckland, where she completed a Bachelor of Fine Arts in 1973.

== Career ==
From the early 1970s Muggeridge lived outside New Zealand, including in Paris, Wales and London. In 1985 she held an exhibition at New Zealand House.

In 2000, Muggeridge returned to New Zealand, settling in Wellington where she learned screenprinting from Michael Smither. She won the first New Zealand Portrait Gallery Adam Portraiture award in 2000 for Lucy in her Green Dress and again in 2002 for Meren and Josie, receiving commendations in the contest in a further five years.

Muggeridge's success in the Adam Portraiture Award led to commissions to paint portraits of notable New Zealanders, including Don Brash for Reserve Bank of New Zealand, Professor Alan MacDiarmid and Sir Paul Callaghan for the Royal Society of New Zealand and Professors James McWha and Judith Kinnear for Massey University.

In 2011, she returned to live and work in Taranaki.

In 2013, the New Zealand Portrait Gallery held a major retrospective of Muggeridge's work, including some 50 nudes, portraits of individuals and groups, and landscapes.

Muggeridge's work is in the collections of many notable New Zealand Institutions, including Museum of New Zealand Te Papa Tongarewa, Taranaki's Puke Ariki and the New Zealand Portrait Gallery.

== Style and methods ==
Muggeridge's style is described as realist. She prefers to paint from life. She says her paintings of people often involve multiple sittings, and some have taken up to four years to complete. She also speaks of the importance of the relationship between the artist and the sitter in portraiture, using colour and shadow in landscape painting and when painting a nude, attention to skin tones.

Muggeridge says she changes between landscapes and portraits because changing between the two can bring about feelings of relief or stimulation. She has used a freezer to keep oil paint wet between sittings.

== Awards ==
- Winner, 2000 Adam Portraiture Award, New Zealand Portrait Gallery, for Lucy in her Green Dress
- Winner, 2002 Adam Portraiture Award, New Zealand Portrait Gallery, for Meren and Josie
