= Link Abrams =

American-New Zealand basketball player

Personal information
- Born: 11 July 1973 (age 53) Little Rock, Arkansas
- Listed height: 198 cm (6 ft 6 in)
- Listed weight: 109 kg (240 lb)

Career information
- College: New Mexico Military (1992–1994); Centenary (1994–1996)
- NBA draft: 1996: undrafted
- Playing career: 1998–2013
- Position: Power forward

Career history
- 1998–2002: Taranaki Stormers
- 2003–2013: Taranaki Mountainairs

Career highlights
- NBL Co-Kiwi MVP (2007); NBL Most Outstanding Forward (2007); NBL Most Outstanding Kiwi Forward/Centre (2007); 2× NBL All-Star Five (2003, 2007); NBL rebounding champion (2007)

Lincoln "Link" Abrams (born 11 July 1973) is an American-New Zealand former basketball player. He played college basketball in the United States for New Mexico Military Institute and Centenary College. He debuted in the New Zealand National Basketball League (NBL) in 2003 and played his final NBL season in 2013, playing his entire career with the Taranaki Mountainairs.

== Early life ==
Abrams was born in Little Rock, Arkansas.

== Playing career ==
=== College and early years after ===
Abrams first played college basketball at New Mexico Military Institute before transferring to Centenary College. As a junior at Centenary in 1994–95, he averaged 11.9 points, 6.1 rebounds, 1.1 assists and 1.1 blocks in 27 games. As a senior in 1995–96, he averaged 18.3 points, 8.6 rebounds, 1.8 assists and 1.1 blocks in 27 games.

After graduating from college, Abrams attempted to play in Spain and had a stint in Bolivia with Ingenieros.

=== Taranaki Stormers (1998–2002) ===
In 1998, Abrams moved to New Zealand to play for the Taranaki Stormers in the Conference Basketball League (CBL), the national second division competition. For the next two years, he split his year between his hometown of Little Rock and New Plymouth. He stayed on in 2001 and remained in New Zealand for the rest of his playing career.

In 2001, Abrams helped the Stormers win the CBL Central Conference and was named to the CBL Finals All-Star Five. In 2002, he led the Stormers to a perfect 18–0 season while winning the CBL Central Conference and the CBL championship. The Stormers defeated the Kaikoura Whale Riders 85–81 in the final, with Abrams recording 18 points and 17 rebounds. He was subsequently named to the CBL playoff tournament team.

=== Taranaki Mountainairs (2003–2013) ===
Abrams made his National Basketball League (NBL) debut with the Taranaki Mountainairs in 2003 and proved he could play as an undersized power player at the higher level. In his first NBL season, he averaged 28.8 points and 10.0 rebounds per game and earned league All-Star Five honours. Following the 2003 season, Abrams gained New Zealand citizenship and attended the Tall Blacks' Olympic trials.

In his fourth season with the Mountainairs in 2007, Abrams was named Co-Kiwi MVP, Most Outstanding Forward, Most Outstanding Kiwi Forward/Centre and All-Star Five. He averaged 20.4 points and a league-leading 11.5 rebounds per game, earning him the Garry Pettis Memorial Trophy for being the rebounding champion.

In 2008, Abrams was twice named player of the week and finished second in the league with 9.8 rebounds per game.

In the opening game of the 2009 season, Abrams ruptured the patellar tendon in his right knee. He underwent surgery and was ruled out for the rest of the season. He had not missed a match for Taranaki in the previous six seasons. Recovery took longer than expected and he subsequently missed the entire 2010 season as well.

Abrams returned to the Mountainairs' line-up for the 2011 season and averaged 10.8 points and 6.9 rebounds per game, as well as a league-leading .649 field goal percentage. In 2012, he averaged 11.7 points and 6.7 rebounds per game.

In his final season in 2013, Abrams averaged 16.3 points and 8.2 rebounds per game. In the season finale, he recorded 27 points and 18 rebounds in a 144–137 quadruple overtime loss to the Otago Nuggets. Abrams finished his NBL career with 2,950 points (18.8pg) and 1,410 rebounds (9.0pg) in 157 games.

== Personal life ==
Abrams was a math teacher at Spotswood College during and after his basketball career.
