= Kiingi Tuheitia Portraiture Award =

New Zealand award for Māori portraiture

The Kiingi Tuheitia Portraiture Award is a biennial art award in New Zealand, hosted in Wellington by the New Zealand Portrait Gallery in partnership with the Office of the Māori Queen. The award was named for the Māori King, Tūheitia. It was launched in August 2020 and was first presented in 2021. In addition to showcasing emerging Māori artists, the award is intended to hold a role in recording and naming ancestors from various Māori hapū and iwi, and their stories.

The award is preceded by a competition, encouraging Māori artists to create portraits of their ancestors (tūpuna) in any visual medium. A panel of judges selects finalists from the competition entries and these works are shown in a three-month long exhibition, hosted by the New Zealand Portrait Gallery and timed to coincide with Matariki. Following the closure of the inaugural award competition exhibition in August 2021, the exhibition toured the country for two years. A second competition was presented in 2023.

== 2021 competition ==
The inaugural competition in 2021 attracted 128 entries; 50 finalists were selected and exhibited in the award exhibition. The judging panel selected a first prize winner, a runner-up and awarded 13 Honourable Mentions. The judges were Sir Derek Lardelli, Kura Te Waru Rewiri and Lisa Reihana.

	Artist	Work	Subject	Medium	Notes
First Prize	Bodie Friend	Nana Pat	Pat Kingi	Black and white photograph	
Runner-up	Te Haunui Tuna	Survival	Tamarau Waiari	Digital drawing and video	

== 2023 competition ==
The 2023 competition had 96 entries and 43 finalists. The judges were Steve Gibbs, Mr G (Graham Hoete) and Lisa Reihana. The winner gets a NZ$20,000 prize and runner-up gets a NZ$2,500 prize. Judges commendations and the winners were announced on May 24 2023.

One of the entries, Heke Mai, by Robert Pritchard-Blunt was created using artificial intelligence (AI) and Photoshop and is a picture of his maternal great-great-grandmother, Rakapa Rakapa Tarapiipipi of Ngāti Hauā.

The winning entry by Stevei Houkāmau was partly inspired by time she spent on a Native American reservation in New Mexico and learning about blue corn seeds that had been with people for generations. The work is about her great-great-grandmother Hinemaurea and the wider family also. Hinemaurea was the daughter of Raramaitai and married to Te Aotaki, they had five children including Ruataupare, who was married to Tūwhakairiora (a Ngāti Porou chief).

Hinemaurea was seen to have great mana and has two existing marae named after her, including our marae in Wharekahika, Hicks Bay. (Stevei Houkāmau 2023)

	Artist	Work	Subject	Medium	Notes
First Prize	Stevei Houkāmau	Kia Whakatōmuri te haere whakamua,	Hinemaurea	uku or clay	
Runner-up	Ming Ranginui	Swept under the Rug	Heeni Jayne Ranginui	broomstick, muka, cotton pearl thread	
Highly commended	Heramaahina Eketone	Ngaa Houhanga Rongo .	artists grandfather's tūpuna - Toroa, Manutongaatea, Kai-ahi, Peehaa-nui, Kookako, WhaeaTaapoko, Tamainupoo	acrylic on MDF	
Highly commended	Tia Barrett	A Time Capsule of Aroha	artists grandmother - Ruby Rangiwhakahaere Ngahere Barrett	photograph	
Highly commended	Michelle Estall	When it's time to come home...	Elizabeth (Lizzie) Lunjevich nee Waru 1899- 1951	Acrylic on stretched canvas	
Highly commended	Bobby Luke	Ngākau Mahaki	Huirangi Eruera Waikerepuru	Moving image	
Highly commended	Tukiri Tini	Kai Whakairo	Te Hira Roa Pateoro, William Bill Tini	Wood carving	
