= Culture of Auckland =

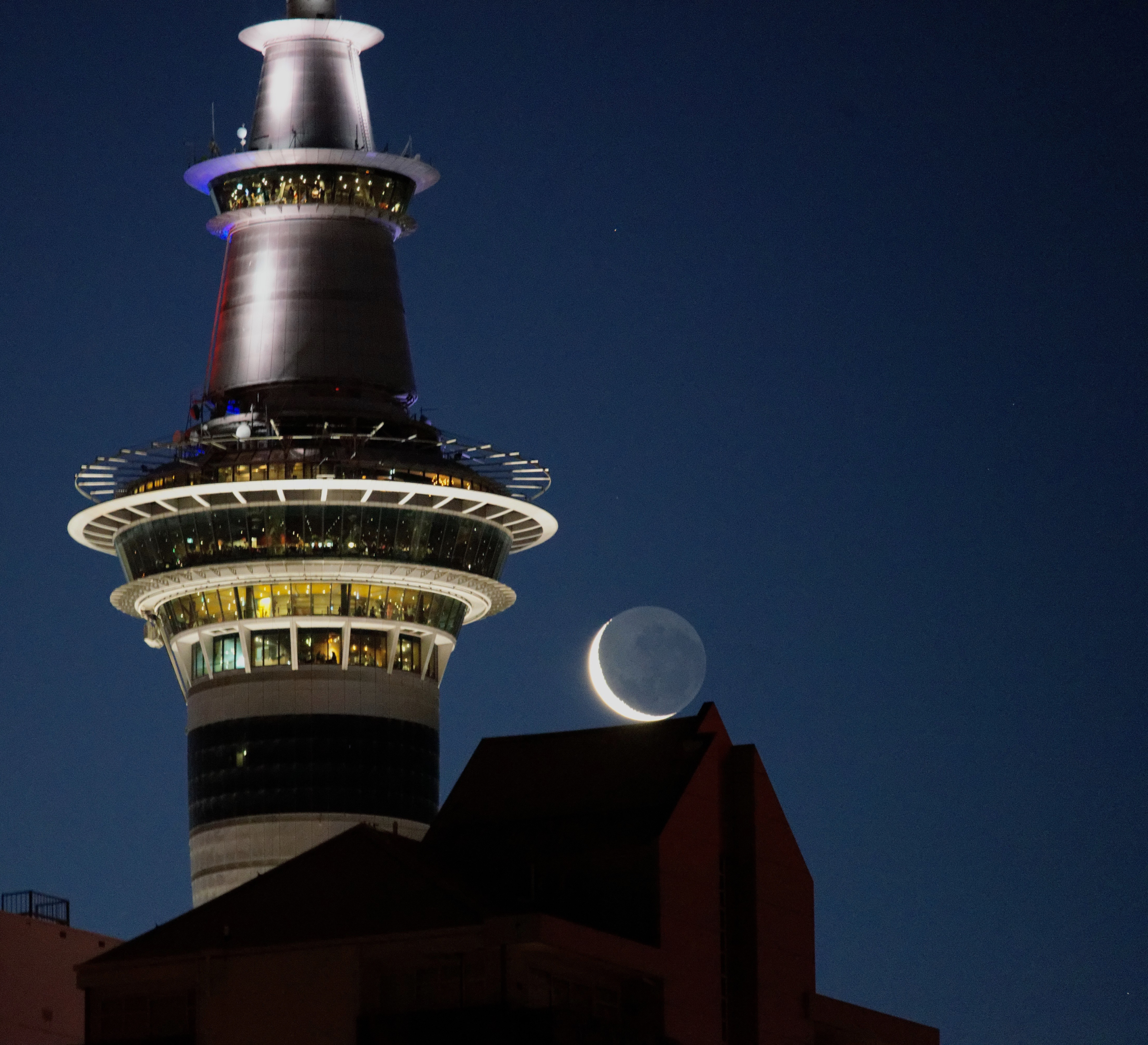
Auckland's iconic Sky Tower at night, the tallest structure in the Southern Hemisphere and a cultural landmark

Auckland, New Zealand's largest city, has a rich and dynamic cultural life and a long, multicultural history. The city's culture includes artistic, culinary, literary, musical, political and social elements.

Auckland is regarded as a highly cosmopolitan and ethnically superdiverse city, similar to Sydney and Vancouver, with the largest Polynesian population in the world. Its genesis as New Zealand's cultural heart began with the large-scale settlement of its fertile land by Ngāti Whātua and various Tainui hapū, before the arrival of Pākehā. Auckland's culture further derives from its multicultural demographics, thanks to large-scale Indian, Cook Islands Māori, Tongan, Tokelauan, British, Irish, Fijian, Chinese, Niuean, Samoan, Filipino, and intertribal Māori immigration, among others. From there, these communities established ethnic strongholds (e.g. historically Samoans in Grey Lynn and Ponsonby, Chinese in Howick, Indians in Papatoetoe, etc).

Auckland has a strong arts scene, with dozens of galleries, and a well-established food culture.
