= New Zealand Portrait Gallery =

Art museum in Wellington, New Zealand

New Zealand Portrait Gallery Te Pūkenga Whakaata
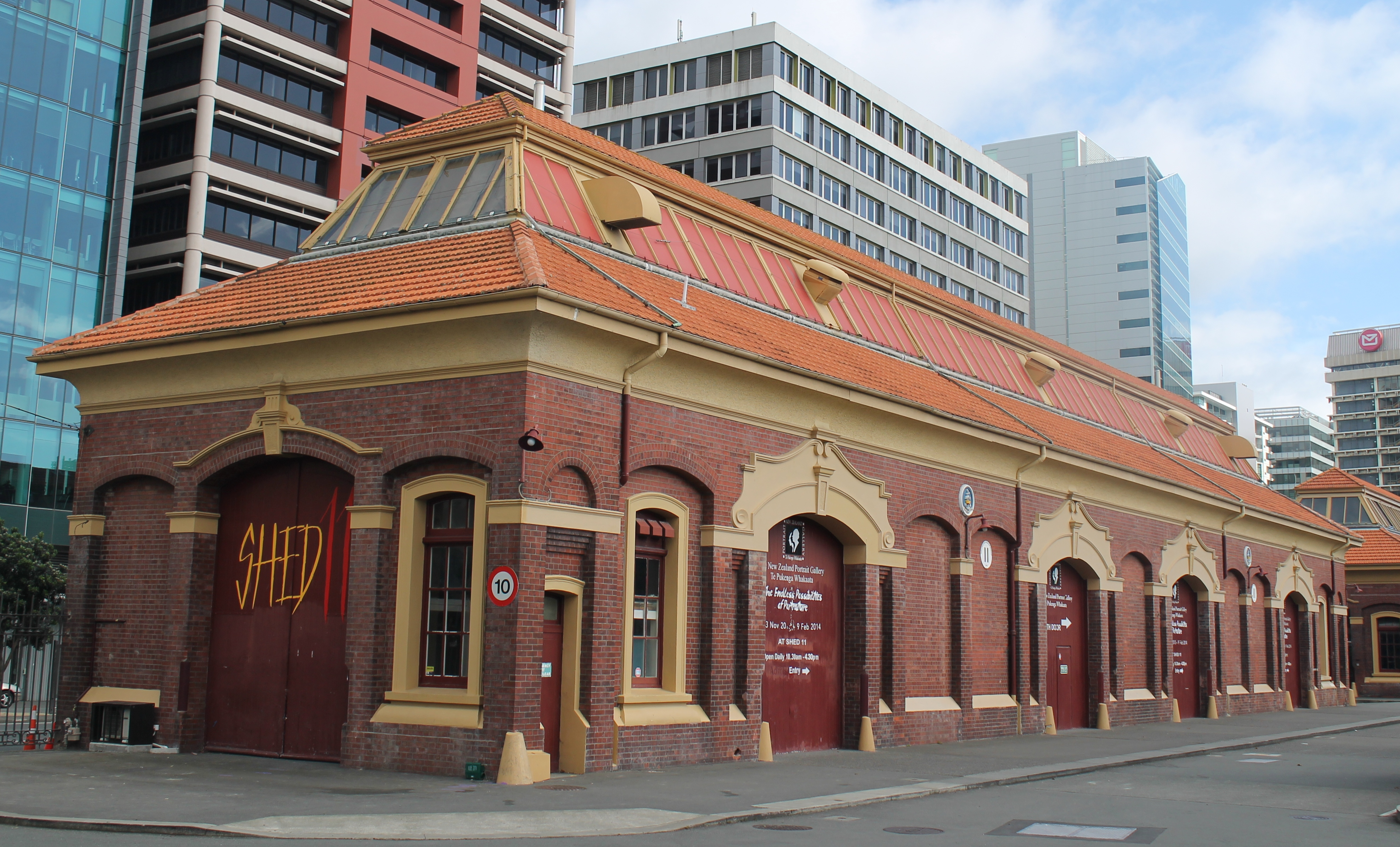
- New Zealand Portrait Gallery at Shed 11

- Location in Wellington, New Zealand
- Established: 1990
- Location: Shed 11, Queen's Wharf, Wellington Waterfront
- Coordinates: 41.283475°S 174.778240°E
- Website: Official website

The New Zealand Portrait Gallery Te Pūkenga Whakaata is an art gallery in the Waterfront Shed 11 building in Wellington, New Zealand.

== History ==
The gallery was registered as a charitable trust in 1990. In 2005 the board hired its first paid director, Avenal McKinnon, who held the position until her resignation in 2014. During this time the permanent collection grew from six works to more than 200. In 2014, Gaelen Macdonald was appointed as McKinnon's successor. In 2017, Jaenine Parkinson took over the role of director.

== Location ==
The New Zealand Portrait Gallery's permanent home and exhibition space is in Shed 11, a heritage listed building located on Wellington's Queens Wharf. Shed 11 was built in 1904–5 and designed by William Ferguson, chief engineer of the Wellington Harbour Board. In 1985, Shed 11 was transformed into a gallery space and in 2010 the New Zealand Portrait Gallery secured a long term lease on the building.

== Collection ==
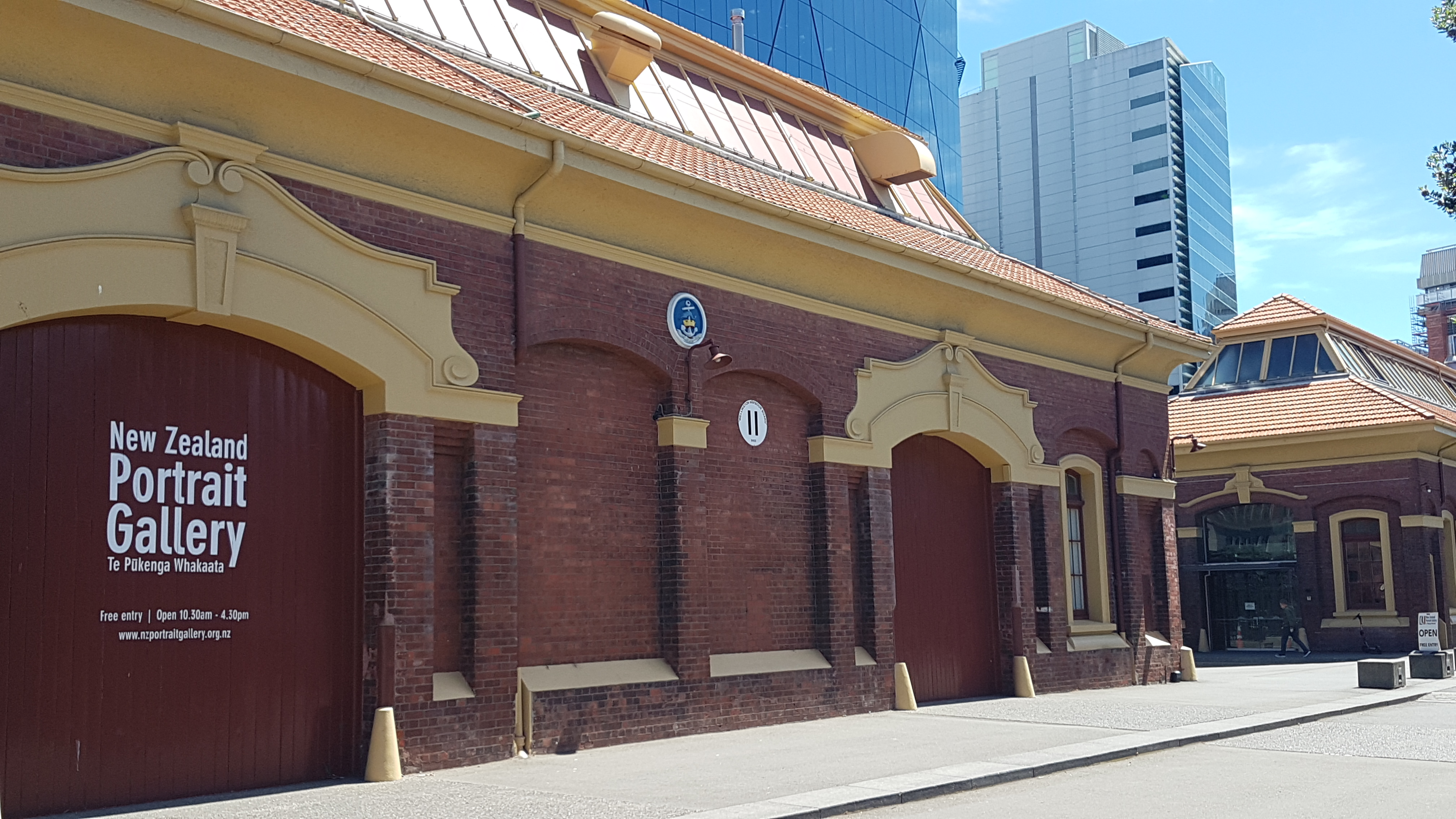
View from the street of the gallery building

The New Zealand Portrait Gallery holds a collection of portraits featuring works by, and of, New Zealanders. In the collection are portraits of many influential and well-known identities including Sir Edmund Hillary, Dame Kiri Te Kanawa, Sir Peter Blake, and Janet Frame.

In 2014, a portrait of Queen Elizabeth II was commissioned for the gallery. It was painted by New Zealand artist Nick Cuthell in a live sitting. The portrait was unveiled by Prince William, Duke of Cambridge, in a ceremony at Government House, and was subsequently hung at the gallery's home in Shed 11.

Additionally, the museum makes its collection available online here.

== Awards ==
The New Zealand Portrait Gallery hosts two biennial awards: the Adam Portraiture Award and the Kiingi Tuheitia Portraiture Award.
