= Stichbury =

Stichbury is a surname. Notable people with the surname include:

- Mark Stichbury, New Zealand artist, member of NZ Christian metal band
- Peter Stichbury (artist) (born 1969), New Zealand artist
- Peter Stichbury (potter) (1924–2015), New Zealand studio potter
