= Peter Stichbury =

Peter Stichbury may refer to:

- Peter Stichbury (artist) (born 1969), New Zealand artist
- Peter Stichbury (potter) (1924–2015), New Zealand studio potter
