= Braunias =

Braunias is a surname. Notable people with the surname include:

- Mark Braunias (1955–2024), New Zealand painter
- Steve Braunias (born 1960), New Zealand author, columnist, journalist and editor, brother of Mark
