= McKenzie & Willis Store =

Facade in Christchurch, New Zealand

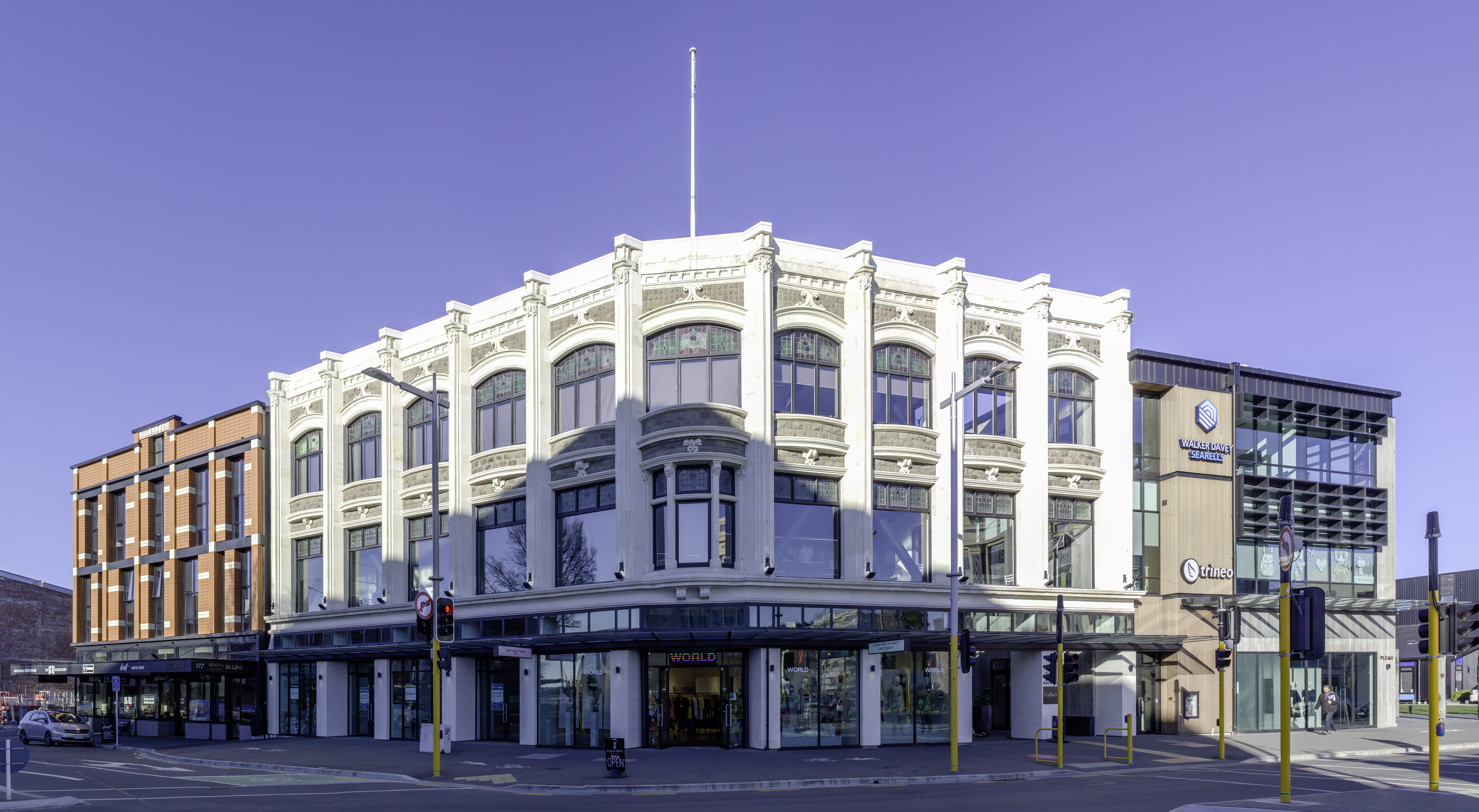
- McKenzie & Willis Store in 2019

General information
- Location: Christchurch, New Zealand
- Address: 181 High Street and Tuam Street
- Coordinates: 43.5354°S 172.6411°E

Design and construction
- Architect(s): Robert England and Edward England

Heritage New Zealand – Category 2
- Designated: 26 November 1981
- Reference no.: 1909

McKenzie & Willis facade is a building facade in Christchurch, New Zealand. The building was constructed in 1910 for a furniture retailer and continued to be used for furniture retail until the 2010 and 2011 Christchurch earthquakes occurred, which caused damage to the building. As a result, the building had to be demolished in 2015 but a facadism was performed and a new building complex was built behind the facade.

== Description ==
Located at the corner of High and Tuam Streets, the building is three storeys tall and has columns on the facade that go from the first to second floors. High Street is a diagonal, so the building wraps around a 135° corner. The facade uses stone veneer and there are decorative windows sitting above larger clear windows.

== History ==
The building was constructed in 1910 for the furniture manufacturer and retailer A J White's. It replaced and extended buildings that were already at that location. The building was designed by the architects Robert England and younger brother Edward, who together also designed McLean's Mansion and part of Riccarton House. In 1981 the building was designated by Heritage New Zealand as a category 2 historic place.

== Earthquakes ==
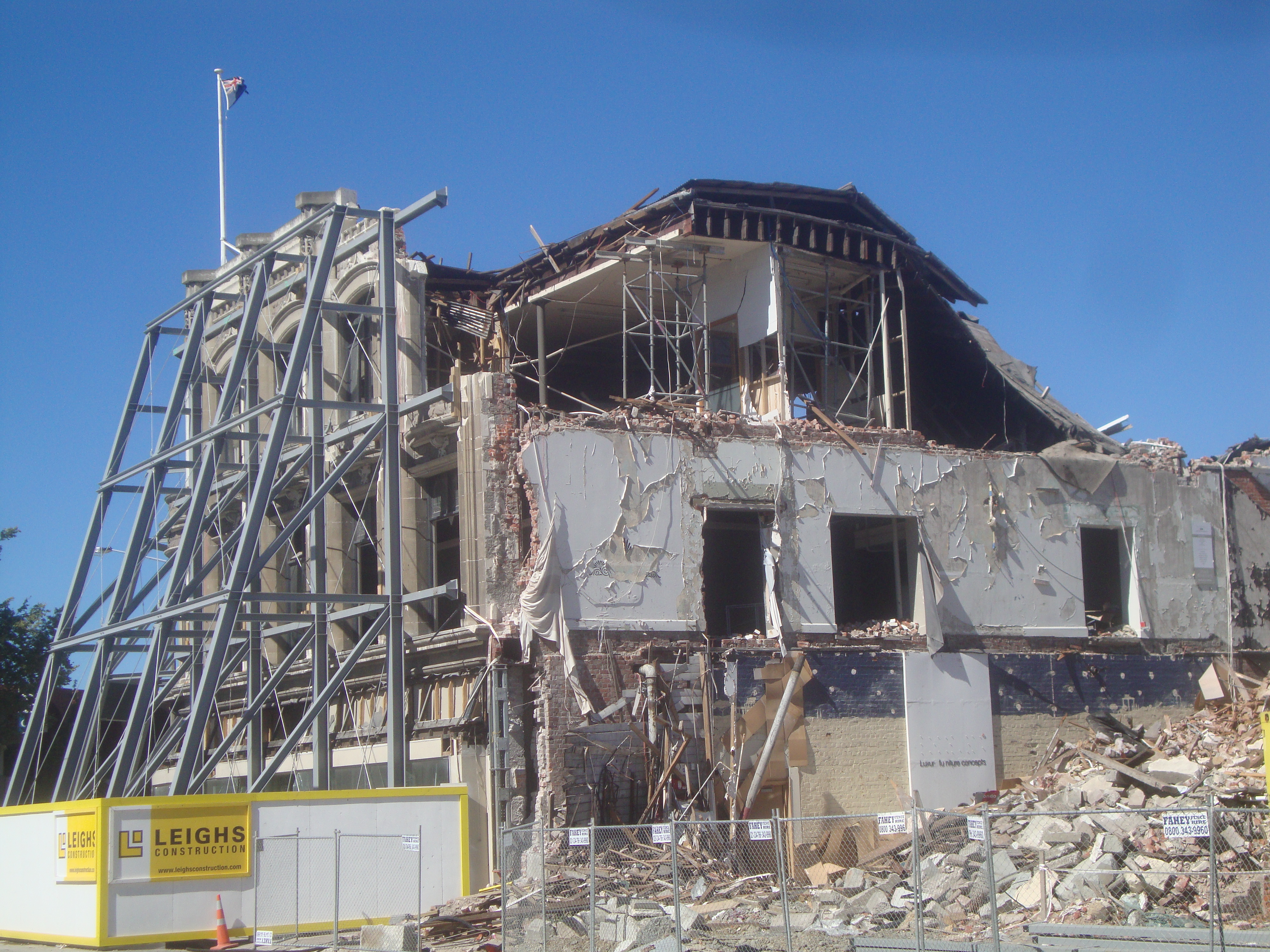
The building being demolished and facade being supported, March 2012

After the 2010 and 2011 Christchurch earthquakes caused damage to the building, it was demolished in 2015 but the facade was restored and earthquake-strengthened. In November 2011, $1 million was granted from the Christchurch Heritage Building Fund to save the facade and support it, as the building itself was being demolished.

After the earthquakes, the retailer McKenzie & Willis relocated to Blenheim Street. When the Christchurch Central Recovery Plan was published in July 2012, the building became a part of the Innovation Precinct, which did not allow retailing. As a result, McKenzie & Willis was not able to return to its former site.

In December 2014 it was announced that the Canterbury Earthquake Recovery Authority (CERA) would construct up to five buildings in a $50 million complex behind the facade. The main tenant was the software security firm Wynard Group with buildings for 100 staff members. Construction of the buildings and a courtyard began in August 2015. Steel was used to strengthen the facade. Restoration of the facade was completed in August 2016 after a cost of approximately $4 million, of which $1.3 million was spent to support the structure.

In June 2016, the company City Centre Christchurch Limited (CCCL) was incorporated by several Christchurch property developers. The company applied to the High Court for a judicial review of the actions of the council and 181 High Limited, the owner of the McKenzie and Willis site. The company was concerned about the resource consent granted for 2,200 square metres (24,000 sq ft) of retail space in the development, as the area had been become a part of the Innovation Precinct in the recovery plan. The company stated that the space was intended to be used for 'innovation', not retail. CCCL backed down in September after 181 High Limited reduced the maximum size per retail tenancy to 150 square metres (1,600 sq ft).

== See also ==
- List of historic places in Christchurch
