= Brian Dawe =

Brian Dawe may refer to:

- Bryan Dawe (born 1948), Australian writer, comedian, political satirist, songwriter, photographer and social activist
- Bing Dawe (born 1952), New Zealand artist and sculptor
