= Sam Foley (artist) =

New Zealand painter (born 1977)

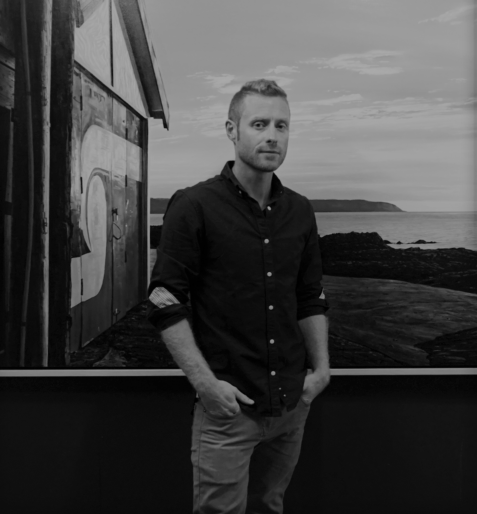
- Born: Wellington, New Zealand
- Known for: Oil painting
- Awards: Highly commended Park Lane Art Awards 2006, Merit Award (1st equal), Parklane Art Awards 2007, Peoples Choice Award Norfolk House Realist Invitational 2008 & 2009, Peoples Choice Award The Wallace Art Awards 2009 & 2010, 1st Prize The Kaipara Wallace Arts Trust Award 2013
- Website: http://samfoley.co.nz

Sam Foley (born 1977) is a contemporary New Zealand landscape painter.

His often large, finely detailed paintings portray nature and urban landscapes, combining aspects of hyper-realism and photo-realism.

== Life and career ==
Sam Foley was born in Wellington, New Zealand and in 1998 received his Bachelor of Fine Arts from the Otago School of Art in Dunedin. In 2007 he won a Merit Award (1st equal) at the Parklane Art Awards in Auckland, with his painting Pathway at Night. He was awarded twice (2008 – 2009) the Peoples Choice Award at the Norfolk House Realist Invitational in Dunedin, and twice (2009 – 2010) the Peoples Choice Award at The Wallace Art Awards in Auckland. In 2013 he won The Kaipara Wallace Arts Trust Award, with his painting Tilting at the Beast. The award founder and arts patron Sir James Wallace acquired one of Foley's kinetic paintings entitled Opoho Intersection No.1.

Since 2008 he has visited Europe regularly, spending extensive periods of time in Berlin and attending residencies in Norway and Switzerland. His works can be found in several private and public art collections such as the Dunedin International Airport collection, the Historic Places Trust of New South Wales in Australia, The ASB Bank in Auckland, The Wallace Trust in Auckland, The Central Library and Salmond College in the University of Otago.

== Moving Image Paintings ==
In 2008 Foley embarked on a 10-week research tour in Europe where he visited more than 30 major museums and galleries. Most of the contemporary galleries had a dedicated moving image section which brought up the idea how to incorporate moving image onto his work. At the end of his research tour Foley returned to New Zealand and started experimenting in his studio with video projections onto his paintings. He recorded video footage of the landscapes he was painting and projected those onto the finished painting. The result was a 'moving image painting' which transports the viewer into the painting for a more immersive experience.

== Selected exhibitions ==
- 2017 - Dowling Street, The Artist's Room, Dunedin, NZ
- 2016 - LAKE, Artbay Gallery, Queenstown, NZ
- 2016 - Rennande Vatn (Running Water), S9 Galeri, Oslo, Norway
- 2015 - Moving Image Paintings, Pataka Art + Museum, Porirua, NZ
- 2015 - Something About the Water, Galerie 9, Solothurn, Switzerland
- 2014 - Harbour, The Artist's Room and Dowling St Studios, Dunedin, NZ
- 2014 - Kontraste, Galerie 9, Solothurn, Switzerland
- 2013 - Into the Deep, Whitespace, Auckland
- 2012 - Running Water, Dowling St Studios, Dunedin
- 2011 - Tiefschwarz, The Artist's Room, Dunedin

== Awards ==
- 2013 - The Kaipara Wallace Arts Trust Award
- 2010 - Peoples Choice Award, The Wallace Art Awards, Auckland
- 2009 - Peoples Choice Award, The Wallace Art Awards, Auckland
- 2009 - Peoples Choice Award, Norfolk House Realist Invitational, Dunedin
- 2008 - Peoples Choice Award, Norfolk House Realist Invitational, Dunedin
- 2007 - Merit Award (1st equal), Parklane Art Awards, Auckland
- 2006 - Highly commended, Park Lane Art Awards, Auckland
- 2005 - The Downie Stewart Peoples Choice Award, Cleveland Art Awards, Dunedin
- 2003 - Peoples Choice Award, Cleveland Art Awards, Dunedin
- 1998 - Merit Award, Oil on Canvas, Southland Young Contemporaries, Invercargill

== Works permanently displayed in collections ==
- Ackerselva Day Study I - 2016 - The Wallace Arts Trust Collection
- Ackerselva Day Study II - 2016 - The Wallace Arts Trust Collection
- Urban Scrawl II - 2016 - The Wallace Arts Trust Collection
- Ackerselva Night Study VI - 2016 - The Wallace Arts Trust Collection
- Te Tahi Bay - 2015 - Pataka Art + Museum
- Tilting at the Beast - 2012 - The Wallace Arts Trust Collection
- Otira Gorge 2011 - The Wallace Arts Trust Collection
- Railway Yard, Ashburton - 2010 - Ashburton Art Gallery
- Edinburgh Study II - 2010 - The Wallace Arts Trust Collection
- Intersection - 2008 - The Wallace Arts Trust Collection
- Registry Building - 2004 - University of Otago Art Collection
- Divergence, St Kilda Beach - 2002 - University of Otago Art Collection
- St Clair from St Kilda - 2002 - University of Otago Art Collection
- Fallen Soldiers Memorial, Otago Peninsula - 2002 - University of Otago Art Collection
- Old Lime Kiln, Otago Peninsula - 2002 - University of Otago Art Collection
- Mapoutahi Pa Site, Dunedin - 2002 - University of Otago Art Collection
- Wreck of the Miniwi - 2003 - Historic Places Trust of New South Wales
- Flagstaff looking South - 2005 - Dunedin International Airport
- On the Surface VII - 2008 - ASB Bank
