= Knox Church =

Knox Church may refer to:

- Knox Church, Christchurch, New Zealand
- Knox Church, Dunedin, New Zealand
