= Wallace Art Awards =

New Zealand awards for contemporary art

The Wallace Art Awards was an annual visual arts award ceremony in New Zealand, established in 1992 and running until 2021. Their goal was to "support, promote and expose contemporary New Zealand art and artists".

== History ==
The awards were established by James Wallace in 1992. Awards were made for contemporary painting, sculpture and photography and were run by the James Wallace Charitable Arts Trust. By 2021 the prizes offered were valued at more than NZ$275,000 and included the offer of artists' residencies overseas. The New Zealand Herald described the list of award recipients as "an arts world who's who".

The 2018 awards were presented by the Rt Hon Dame Patsy Reddy at the Pah Homestead, Auckland on 3 September 2018. In 2020, the trust did not offer residencies as prizes and instead offered cash equivalent prizes due to the COVID-19 pandemic.

The awards were cancelled in 2021, with the James Wallace Charitable Arts Trust announcing that it was "refreshing" its strategic plan. In 2023, when Wallace's 2021 conviction for sexual offending was made public, it was reported that the trust had ended its relationship with Wallace and been renamed The Arts House Trust.

== Paramount Award ==
- 1992 Mark Braunias
- 1993 Jeff Brown
- 1994 Bill Hammond
- 1995 Fatu Feu'u
- 1996 Jenny Dolezel
- 1997 Peter Stichbury
- 1998 Elizabeth Thomson
- 1999 Bing Dawe
- 2000 Gregor Kregar
- 2001 Peter Gibson Smith
- 2002 Judy Millar
- 2003 Jeffrey Harris
- 2004 Jim Speers
- 2005 Sara Hughes
- 2006 Rohan Wealleans
- 2007 James Robinson
- 2008 Richard Lewer
- 2009 Marcus Williams and Susan Jowsey
- 2010 Sam Mitchell
- 2011 Akiko Diegel
- 2012 Shigeyuki Kihara
- 2013 Jae Hoon Lee
- 2014 Roger Mortimer
- 2015 Visesio Siasau
- 2016 Andre Heme
- 2017 Andy Leleisi'uao
- 2018 Imogen Taylor
- 2019 Bob Jahnke
- 2020 Russ Flatt

== Jury Award ==
This award began in 2005.

- 2005 Glenn Burrell, runner up Robert McLeod
- 2006 Hamish Palme
- 2007 Megan Jenkinson
- 2008 Gary McMillan and Kathy Barry
- 2009 Turnskin Kingdom
- 2010 Robyn Hoonhout
- 2011 Philip Dadson
- 2012 Erica van Zon
- 2013 Madeleine Child
- 2014 Stephen Ellis
- 2015 Andrea du Chatenier
- 2016 Cachemaille Bowmast
- 2017 James Oram
- 2018 Paul McLachlan
- 2019 Andrea du Chatenier and Andrew Rankin
- 2020 Wanda Gillespie

== People’s Choice Award ==
This award began in 2005.

- 2005 tie between Claire Beynon, Matthew Browne, and Martha Lundmark
- 2006 Martin Ball
- 2007 Lianne Edwards
- 2008 No award given
- 2009 No award given
- 2010 Sam Foley
- 2011 Susanne Kerr
- 2012 Gareth Price
- 2013 Mark Rutledge
- 2014 Stephen Ellis
- 2015 Wei Lun Ha
- 2016 Ebony Boskovic Mokofisi
- 2017 No award given

== The Wallace Arts Trust Vermont Award Winner ==
From 2006 to 2007 known as the Development Award, 2008–2009 as the Park Lane Wallace Trust Development Award, 2006–2013 as the Wallace Arts Trust Development Award.

- 2006 Maryrose Crook
- 2007 Lianne Edwards, runners-up Kirsten Roberts and Andrea du Chatenier
- 2008 Ruth Cleland, first runner up Matthew Couper, second runner up Liyen Chong
- 2009 Chloe Marsters, first runner up Matt Arbuckle, second runner up Philip Jarvis
- 2010 Graham Fletcher, first runner up Simon Esling, second runner up Iain Cheesman
- 2011 Bronwynne Cornish, first runner up Emil McAvoy, second runner up Anita Levering
- 2012 Katie Theunissen, first runner up Karin Hofko, second runner up Tessa Laird
- 2013 Julia deVille, first runner up Marita Hewitt, second runner up Glen Hayward
- 2014 David McCracken, first runner up Raewyn Turner and Brian Harris, Noel Ivanoff
- 2015 Russ Flatt, first runner up Rose Meyer, second runner up Virginia Were
- 2016 Weilun Ha, first runner up Matthew Browne, second runner up Antje Barke
- 2017 Matt Arbuckle, first runner up, Christina Read, second runner up Matthew Couper
- 2018 Andrea du Chatenier

== Glaister Ennor Award ==
This award was only given in 2006.

- 2006 Peter Madden, first runner up Heather Straka, second runner up Andrew McLeod

== The Kaipara Foundation Wallace Trust Award ==
This award began in 2008.

- 2008 Heather Straka
- 2009 Linden Simmons
- 2010 Glen Hayward
- 2011 Matt Ellwood
- 2012 John Brown
- 2013 Sam Foley
- 2014 Glen Hayward
- 2015 Hugo Lindsay
- 2016 Jeremy Blincoe
- 2017 Rebecca Swan
- 2018 Peata Larkin

== Fulbright-Wallace Arts Trust Award ==
This award began in 2009.

- 2009 Richard Maloy
- 2010 Mark Braunias
- 2011 Brydee Rood
- 2012 Steve Carr
- 2013 Steve Rood
- 2014 Ruth Watson
- 2015 Phil Dadson
- 2016 Simon Morris
- 2017 Shannon Novak
- 2018 Emma Fitts

== The British School at Rome Residency Award Winner ==
This award began in 2017.

- 2017 Deborah Rundle
- 2018 Lucy Meyle
- 2019 Wendelien Bakker

== Martin Tate Wallace Artist Residency Award ==
This award is by invitation only, and is awarded to a senior artist who is unlikely to apply for a Wallace Award.

- 2018 Richard Maloy
