= Robert England (architect) =

New Zealand architect (1863–1908)

Robert William England (8 June 1863 – 15 November 1908) was a New Zealand architect from Christchurch.

== Early life ==
England was born on 8 June 1863 at Lyttelton. His father, Robert West England, was a timber merchant who had come to Lyttelton from Warwickshire, England, in 1860. England Jr. received his education at a Christchurch school. Aged 19, he went to Birmingham to study architecture under Joseph Lancaster Ball, and in 1885, he was admitted to the Royal Institute of British Architects. He returned to Christchurch aged 23 and set up his own practice in 1886, and over time became a prominent architect.

== Professional career ==
England took on many prominent commissions. He designed McLean's Mansion for Allan McLean, which is still the country's largest timber residence. He laid out the show grounds for the A&P Society at Addington and built the office for Dalgety and Company in Cathedral Square. He designed the Ridley Building on the corner of Lichfield and Manchester Streets. He designed a number of churches, including Knox Church on Bealey Avenue, the St Albans Methodist Church, and the Ashburton Presbyterian Church. He designed a large residential building at 85 Papanui Road. Originally known as Wardington, it was purchased by Christchurch Girls' High School in 1921 as their boarding house, and is now known as the "Old House" within Acland House. He designed Elm Tree House in Papanui Road that is registered as a Category II heritage building. He designed a commercial building for Alfred Billens in High Street. Initially known as the England Brothers House, it was later known as Billens' Building. Damaged in the 2011 Christchurch earthquake, like all heritage buildings in that block of High Street, it was destroyed by arson in December 2012. England designed the McDougall residence (now the administration building of Nurse Maude) and the last building of A. J. White's Department Store on the corner of High and Tuam Streets. He designed Acton House in Gisborne on the North Island; his client was originally from Christchurch and the house is now registered as Category I. England worked on extensions of Riccarton House in Riccarton, St Andrew's Church (at that time located adjacent to Christchurch Hospital, but since relocated to Rangi Ruru Girls' School), and St Mary's Church in Halswell.

England designed an iron chimney and applied for a patent. Subsequent to the 1888 North Canterbury and 1901 Cheviot earthquakes, it was claimed that his chimney was earthquake resistant.

He took his younger brother Edward as his business partner, and the practice was then known as England Bros. Whilst his biography on the website of Heritage New Zealand states that the partnership commenced in 1906, the Canterbury edition of The Cyclopedia of New Zealand published in 1903 already refers to "Messrs England Bros". Contemporary newspaper advertisements state that his brother Edward joined the practice in July 1901. England was unwell for some time and at the time of his death, the firm had commissions for the D.I.C. Building in Cashel Street, and new buildings for the Kaiapoi Woollen Company.

=== Listed buildings ===
A number of his building are or were listed with Heritage New Zealand; many of those were demolished after the earthquakes and have thus been removed from the register.

Photo	Name	Completion	Category	Number	Description
	St Mary's Church, Halswell	1891	II	3135	significant extension and refurbishment of the church in 1890–91, with the new south transept housing the organ bought in 1892
	St Andrew's Church	1892	I	304	significant extension of the church, with the original building then forming the nave; the distinctive wheel window is England's design
	St Albans Wesleyan Church	1895	II	1923	new church for the Wesleyan community in St Albans, replacing an earlier church; demolished in 2013 after earthquake damage
	McDougall House	1898	II	1908	designed for Robert McDougall (the person who paid for the McDougall Art Gallery); since 1953 owned by the Nurse Maude Association
	McLean's Mansion	1900	I	300	situated in the Christchurch Central City, it is the country's largest timber residence; severely earthquake damaged and with an uncertain future
	Riccarton House	1900	I	1868	designer of the 1900 extension of this Riccarton residence; fully restored since the earthquakes
	Knox Church	1902	II	3723	new church replacing an earlier building designed by Samuel Farr; badly damaged in the earthquakes but fully restored
	Wharetiki House	1904	II	7551	Edwardian timber dwelling in Colombo Street, Christchurch, with circumstantial evidence that England was the probable architect; demolished in July 2011
	St Andrew's Presbyterian Church, Ashburton	1907	II	1809	new church replacing the adjacent older one; both buildings are still in use
	Acton House	1908	I	7235	residence of Henry White in Gisborne
	D.I.C. Building, Christchurch	1909	II	3096	retail premises that replaced an earlier building lost in a 1908 fire designed by England just before he died; demolished after the Christchurch earthquakes
	McKenzie & Willis store	ca. 1910	II	1909	the last building built for A. J. White (adjacent to two former buildings in Tuam Street) and later part of McKenzie & Willis; façade kept after the earthquakes
	Elm Tree House	info missing	II	1885	residential building at 236 Papanui Road, Christchurch; repaired since earthquakes

== Death ==
England died on 15 November 1908 from influenza at age 45 and was buried at Linwood Cemetery. He was survived by his wife and six children.
