= Elizabeth Thomson (artist) =

New Zealand artist

- Born: 17 October 1955 (age 71); Titirangi, Auckland, New Zealand
- Education: Elam School of Fine Arts
- Known for: Painting

Elizabeth Thomson (born 17 October 1955) is a New Zealand artist.

== Background ==
Thomson was born 1955 in Titirangi, Auckland. She graduated from the Elam School of Fine Arts in 1988 with a Master of Fine Arts. Thomson is based in Wellington.

== Career ==
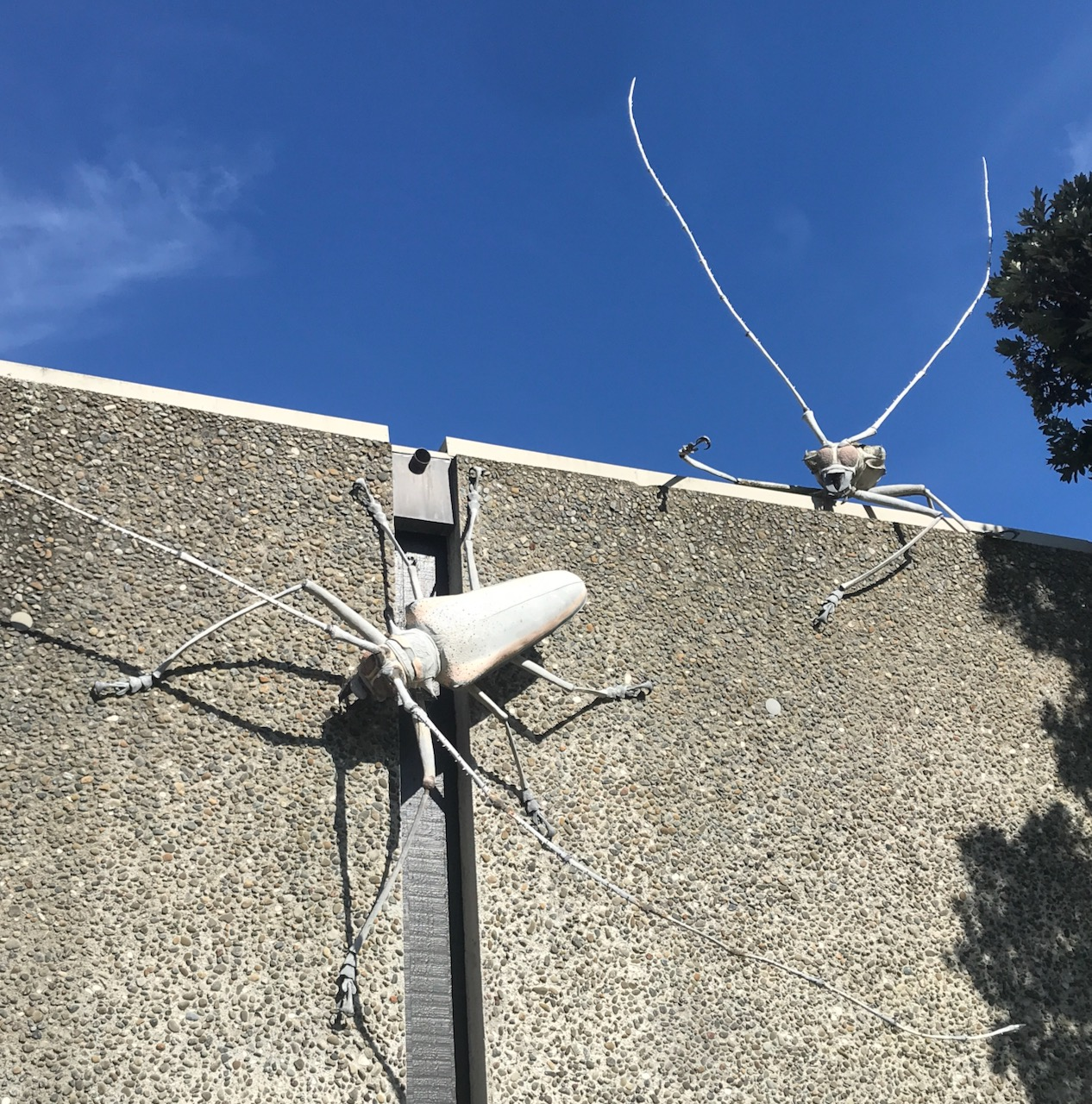
Batocera longhorns & Goliath (1996), Te Manawa, Palmerston North

Thomson is a painter and sculptor utilising botanical, entomological or molecular forms and incorporating them into abstract geometric compositions. She uses various tools and mediums to create her works, including sculpture and miniatures.

In 1998, Thomson won the Paramount Award in the Wallace Arts Awards with her piece 'Southern Cross Paterre'. In 1987 and 1989 she received grants from the Arts Council of New Zealand.

Thomson is represented by Page Blackie Gallery.

Works by Thomson are held in the public collections of the Museum of New Zealand Te Papa Tongarewa and Auckland Art Gallery Toi o Tāmaki.

=== Exhibitions ===
- 2017, The Black-and-whites, Page Blackie Gallery, Wellington
- 2017, Invitation to Openness, Two Rooms, Auckland
- 2017, Landscape 2017, Page Blackie Gallery, Wellington (group show)
- 2016, Freedom and Structure | Navigating the Zone, Page Blackie Gallery, Wellington
- 2016, Subliminal, Two Rooms, Auckland
- 2015, Botanical Studies, Page Blackie Gallery, Wellington
- 2015, Body of the Sentient, Two Rooms, Auckland
- 2015, Between Memory and Oblivion, Page Blackie Gallery, Wellington
- 2014, Transitive States, Two Rooms, Auckland
- 2014, Hanene - Breathing Gently, Page Blackie Gallery, Wellington
- 2014, Voyage Sauvage, Dominik Mersch Gallery, Sydney
- 2014, Elysian Fields, Pataka Art + Museum, Porirua
- 2013, Landscape, Page Blackie Gallery, Wellington
- 2013, Auckland Art Fair
- 2013, Line/Form/Colour/Intention - An Exhibition Exploring Abstraction, Blackie Gallery, Wellington
- 2012, The Ocean of Eden, Two Rooms, Auckland
- 2012, Islands of Dodonaea, RH Gallery, Upper Moutere, Nelson
- 2011, Colour/Field, City Gallery Wellington, Wellington
- 2010, Another Green World, Tauranga Art Gallery, Tauranga
- 2009, Le Planete Sauvage, Two Rooms, Auckland
- 2009, Tonight in the Mystic Garden, Black Barn Gallery, Havelock North
- 2008, Astrophysics and the Thomson Effect, Mark Hutchins Gallery, Wellington
- 2008, Supposition, Two Rooms, Auckland
- 2008, Horoeka, RH Gallery, Upper Moutere, Nelson
- 2007, Relativity and the Fourth Dimension, Mark Hutchins, Wellington
- 2007, Studies for the Bigger Picture, Anna Bibby Gallery, Auckland
- 2006, Elizabeth Thomson: My Hi-Fi, My Sci- Fi, touring show, curated by Gregory O’Brien for City Art Gallery, Wellington
