= James Wallace (businessman) =

New Zealand arts patron and sex offender

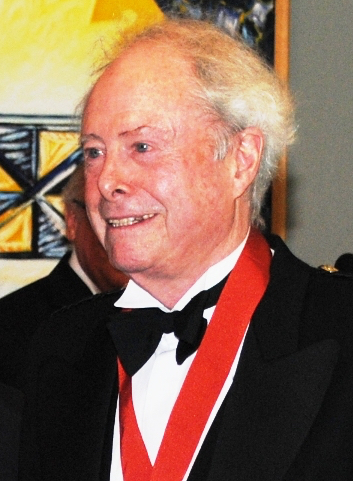
- Wallace in 2011
- Born: James Hay Wallace; 23 November 1937 (age 88); Cambridge, New Zealand
- Known for: Arts patronage, conviction for sexual offending

James Hay Wallace (born 23 November 1937) is a New Zealand businessman, arts patron, and convicted sex offender.

Wallace amassed a collection of New Zealand art that he transferred to the James Wallace Art Trust in 1992, and was displayed at the Pah Homestead in Auckland. Also in 1992, he established the Wallace Art Awards for New Zealand artists.

In 2021, Wallace was found guilty of indecently assaulting three men, but his identity was suppressed until June 2023. Subsequent to these convictions, a substantial proportion of the art in the James Wallace Arts Trust was in early 2023 resettled on an entirely independent trust, the Arts House Trust.

== Early life and family ==
Wallace was born in Cambridge on 23 November 1937, the son of James Dunning Wallace and Frances Lindsay Wallace (née Hay). His father was a pig farmer and agricultural contractor who, in 1937, founded a small rendering company, J. D. Wallace Limited, that would eventually become the Wallace Corporation. James Dunning Wallace was appointed an Officer of the Order of the British Empire, for services to farming, in the 1994 Birthday Honours.

Wallace was educated at King's College, Auckland, from 1951 to 1955, and won a scholarship to study for his last year of secondary school in Boston, during which time he developed his interest in art and opera. He went on to study law, graduating with a Bachelor of Laws degree from Auckland University College in 1961. He gained international experience working in New York for a year, and worked as company secretary and company solicitor for Robert Kerridge at Rank/Hanimex and Woolf Fisher at Fisher & Paykel, before joining the family business.

== Business career ==
Wallace joined his father's rendering business, J. D. Wallace Limited, while his younger brother David partnered with their father in farm contracting and cattle and dairy farming operations as J. D. and R. D. Wallace Limited. J. D. Wallace took over other rendering companies, and Wallace established other rural services companies Wallford Meats (NZ) Limited, Eureka Hides and Skins Limited, and Wallace Industries Limited, which were amalgamated as Wallace Corporation Limited (WCL) in 1994. In February 1992, Wallace was appointed Director of Rontek Services Ltd with 0.10% share, and the other 99.90% held by Wallace Industries Ltd. In 2007, WCL was reported to employ 600 staff seasonally and had an annual turnover of about $200 million. In 2017, WCL merged its meat co-products businesses with Farm Brands Limited, to form Wallace Group Limited Partnership. The Wallace and WCL interests in Farm Brands Limited have subsequently been sold. The merger excluded WCL's farms, investments in biopolymer companies, and its Chilean dairying operation. Out of 51 historical holdings, Wallace remains active only in Wallace Productions Ltd and WCL.

== Arts patronage ==
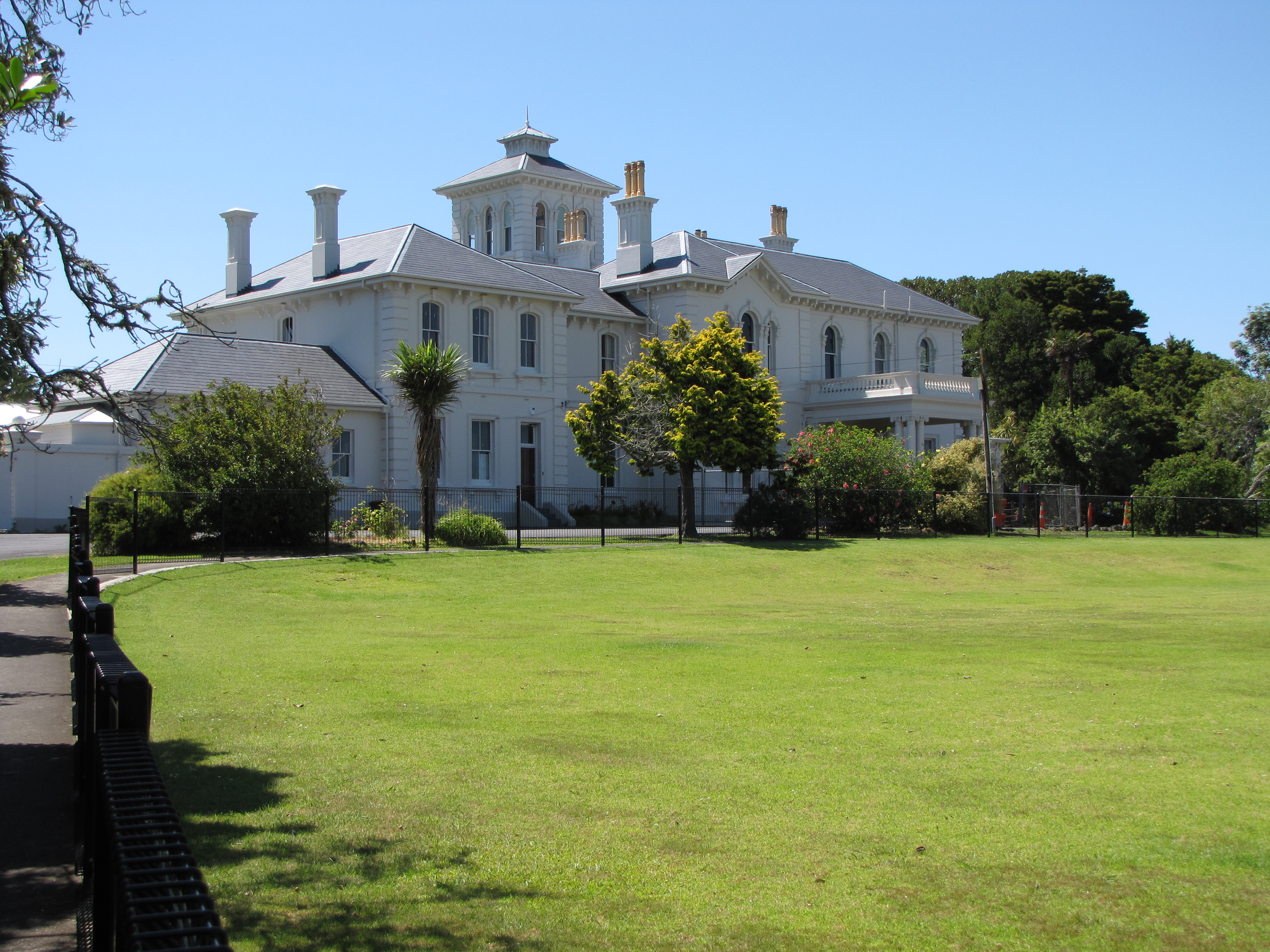
Pah Homestead

Wallace began collecting art in the 1960s, with a focus on young and emerging New Zealand artists. His first acquisition was a Toss Woollaston watercolour in 1964. In 1992, he established the James Wallace Arts Trust, to which he transferred ownership of his collection, which by 2020 held over 9,000 pieces. In 2010, the collection moved from Wallace's home to the Pah Homestead in the Auckland suburb of Hillsborough, which is leased from Auckland City As noted above, most of the art in the James Wallace Arts Trust was resettled in early 2023 on an entirely independent trust, the Arts House Trust, and lease of the Pah Homestead assigned to the Arts House Trust. The James Wallace Arts Trust continues to exist, but no longer has a public profile.

In 1992, Wallace founded the Wallace Art Awards, the richest awards, mostly as overseas residencies, for New Zealand artists. The final awards occurred in 2020. While operational, the James Wallace Arts Trust injected about $1 million into the arts in New Zealand annually, through new acquisitions and another approximately $200,000 for the Wallace Art Awards. Wallace has been involved with the trust that aims to restore earthquake-damaged McLean's Mansion in Christchurch since 2016. In 2022, it was reported that he had taken the chairmanship of the trust and financed the restoration of the building, which is expected to open to the public in 2024.

== Convictions for sex offences ==
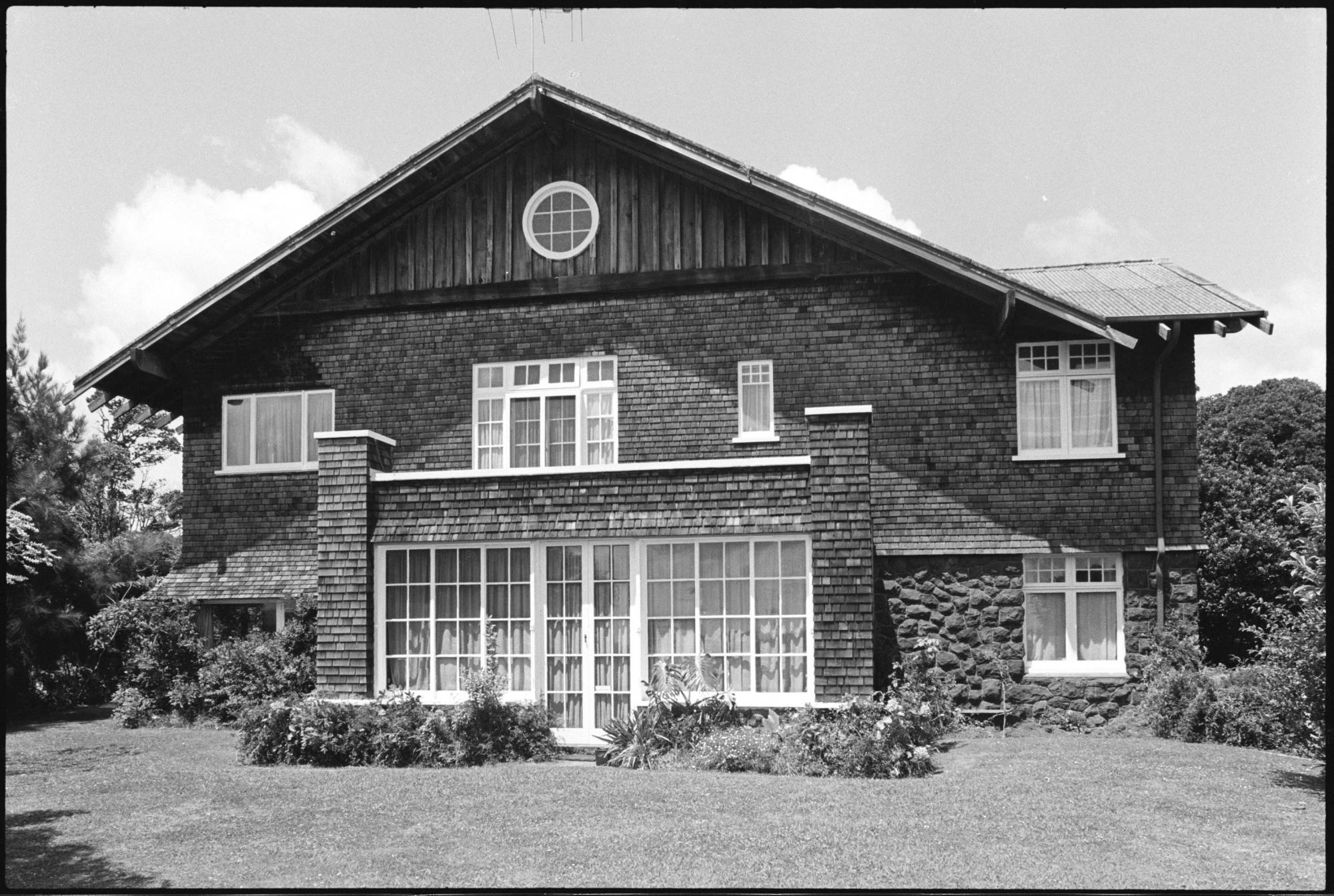
Rannoch House

In 2021, Wallace was found guilty of three charges of indecently assaulting three men and two charges of attempting to dissuade a witness by offering a bribe for the 2016 victim to drop his claims. The assaults took place in 2000 or 2001, in 2008, and in 2016 at Wallace's Epsom home, Rannoch House. He was imprisoned for two years and four months.

Wallace and others made multiple attempts to convince one of the men to drop his complaint. Associates of Wallace, Jevan Goulter and Alison Edmonds, flew to the Gold Coast in 2017 and offered the man work contracts if he came back to New Zealand and withdrew his police statement. Dancer and arts producer Mika X was also involved in the attempt to convince the complainant to drop the complaint, providing a draft contract promising work in the United States.

Goulter and Edmonds were granted immunity from prosecution in return for evidence given against Wallace. Mika X pleaded two counts of attempting to pervert the course of justice, and was sentenced to 11 months home detention.

Wallace first faced trial in 2019, but that trial was aborted. He was found guilty at a subsequent trial in 2021. Wallace initially received name suppression until media entities Stuff and NZME had Wallace's name suppression revoked on the morning of his first trial in 2019. However, Wallace appealed this, and his name could not be revealed while these appeals were being heard.

In June 2023, Wallace's final right to appeal was dismissed by the Supreme Court of New Zealand and his name and convictions were made public. The following week, musician and bar owner Dudley Benson gave interviews to the New Zealand Herald and 1News about his own experience at Rannoch House in 2008, that he had subsequently come forward to report to police. Benson accused the New Zealand arts community of "enabling the offending".

In November 2023, the New Zealand Parole Board decided to parole Wallace from 10 December 2023.

== Honours and awards ==
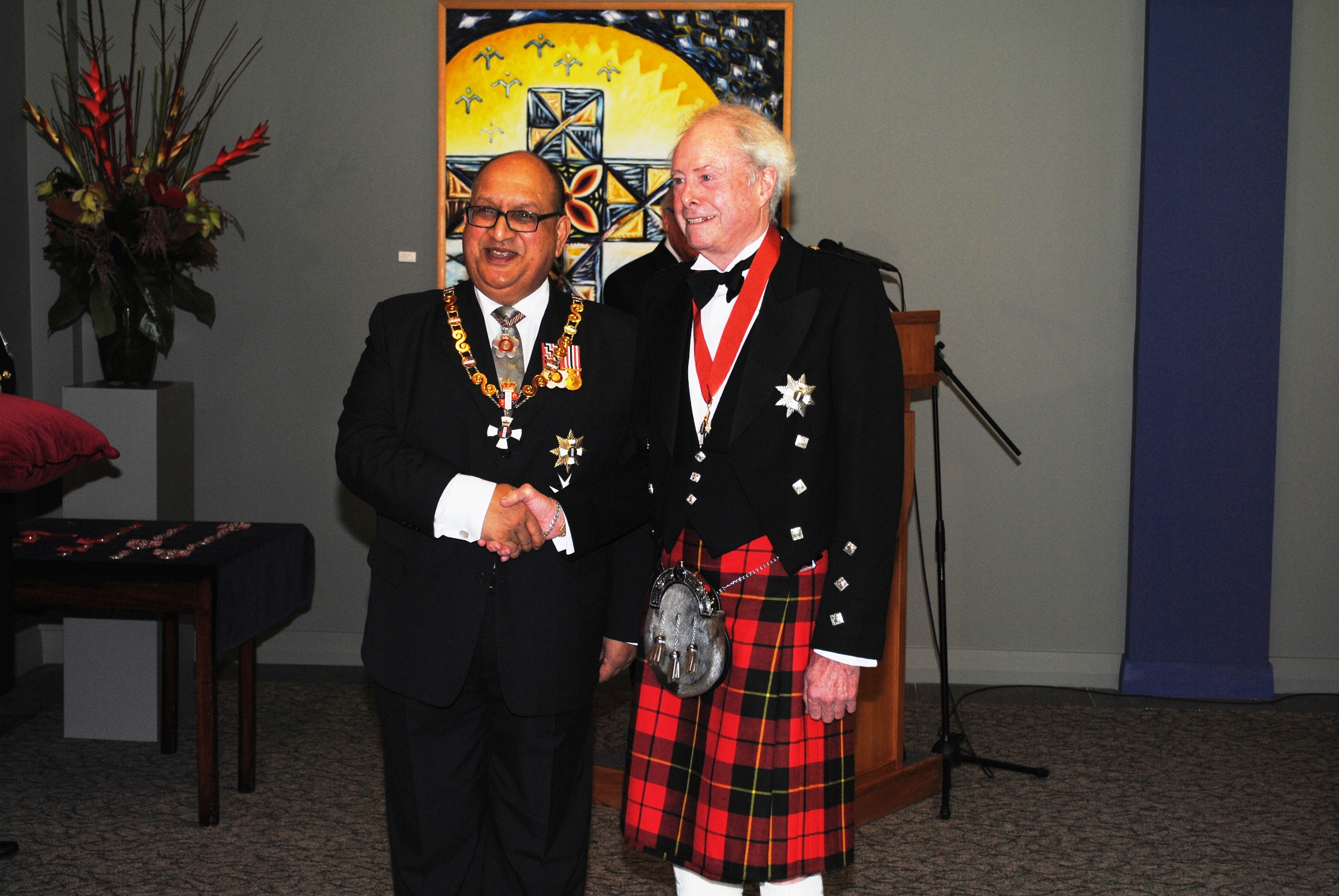
James Wallace KNZM investiture by governor-general, Sir Anand Satyanand, at Government House, Auckland

In the 2001 New Year Honours, Wallace was appointed an Officer of the New Zealand Order of Merit, for services to the arts. He was promoted to Knight Companion of the New Zealand Order of Merit, also for services to the arts, in the 2011 Queen's Birthday Honours.

In December 2018, Wallace was conferred with an honorary doctorate by Auckland University of Technology. In 2019, he received an honorary Master of Arts degree from the Waikato Institute of Technology, which was revoked in 2023 following his convictions for sex offences.

After Wallace's name suppression was lifted in 2023, the government also sought forfeiture of his honours, which King Charles III granted in August 2023. This forfeiture removed Wallace's post-nominal letters, and his title of Sir.
