= Knox Church, Christchurch =

Knox Church
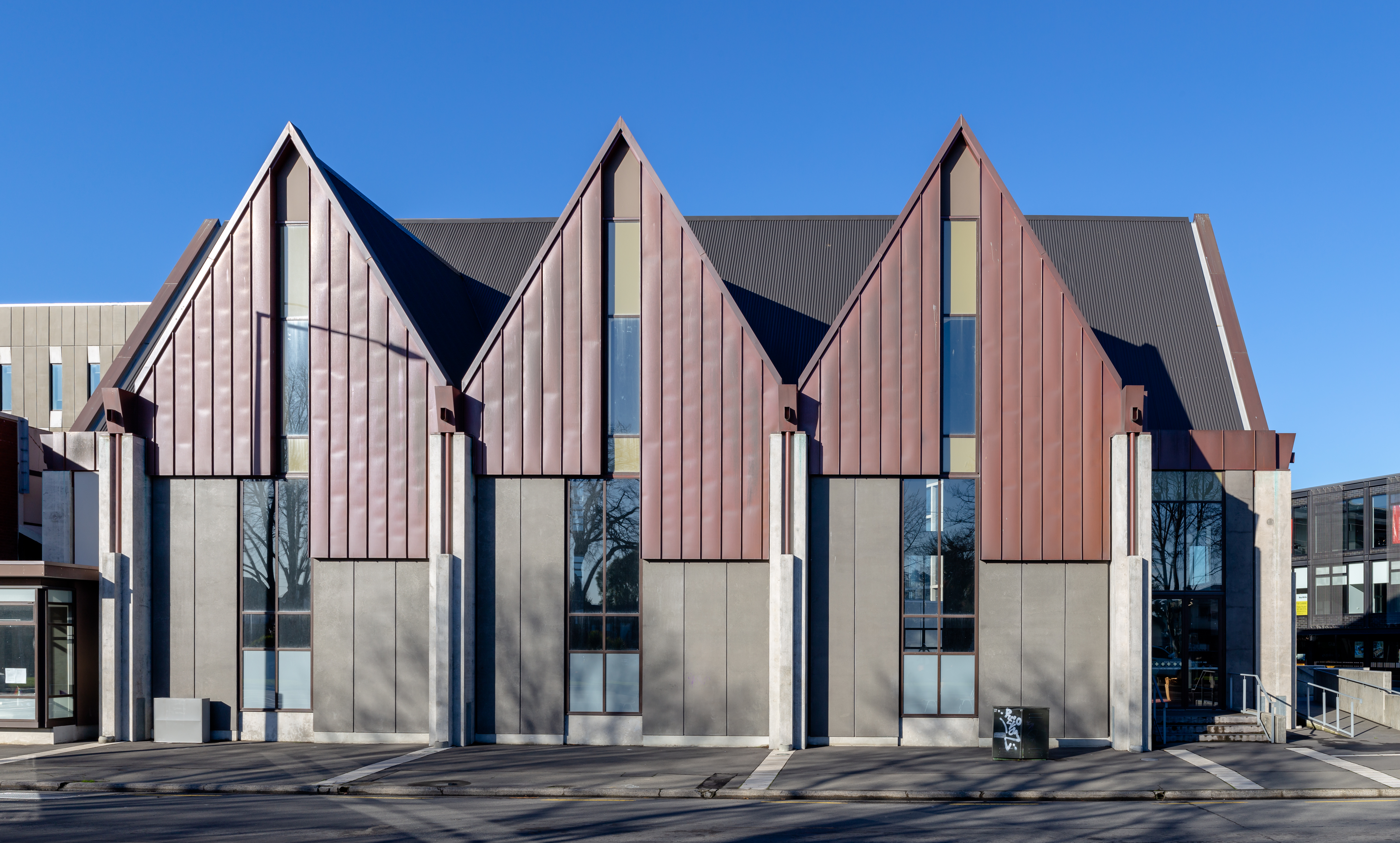
- Knox Church in August 2019, following reconstruction
- Knox Church
- 43°31′16″S 172°37′43″E
- Country: New Zealand
- Denomination: Presbyterian
- Website: www.knoxchurch.co.nz

Architecture
- Heritage designation: Category II
- Designated: 6 September 1984
- Architect(s): Robert England, Wilkie & Bruce Architects (restoration)
- Years built: 1902

Knox Church is a Presbyterian church in Christchurch, New Zealand. It was damaged during the 2011 Christchurch earthquake and re-opened in 2014.

== History ==
The original church was built in 1880 to a design by Samuel Farr. When the attendance increased beyond the capacity of the building, a new church was built in 1902 alongside the first one to a design by Robert England. The church was design in the Gothic Revival style featuring a brick exterior, a distinctive multi-gabled roof, and large timber archways. Rimu and kauri wood were used for the roof, dado panelling, interior woodwoork, and seating,

Knox Church was one of Christchurch's historic buildings that was badly damaged during the 2011 Christchurch earthquake. During the earthquake, the brick gables of Knox Church crumbled from the timber structure leaving the roof exposed from 2011 to 2014 when reconstruction began. The new design was developed by Wilkie & Bruce Architects using the surviving wooden roof structure supported by new concrete columns and steel ties, and a new copper metal cladding system. The original timber on the columns and interior paneling were also retained and restored. Other buildings in the Knox complex remained functional.

The restoration received a Public Architecture Award at the NZIA Canterbury Awards in 2015. It was praised for its modern seismic design and its sympathetic restoration of the original design.

A stained glass window is featured within the western gable, made by artist Graham Stewart. Stewart had first created a stained glass window for the church in 1997, which was destroyed during the earthquake. He created a new window in 2018, which depicts the Canterbury landscape.

=== Church organ ===
The organ at Knox Church was built by Edgar Henry Jenkins in 1904. At the time of the earthquake it was 110 years old and was significantly damaged. The organ was restored by the South Island Organ Company during the reconstruction, costing $500,000 NZD. The organ was converted from a Tubular-pneumatic action to an electric and new trumpet and trombone tones were added.

=== Parish hall ===
The wooden buildings from 1880 were replaced in 1964 with a modern parish hall. The hall had a brick exterior and contained new facilities including a large hall, chapel, lounge, kitchen, and 12 classrooms on the upper floor. The parish hall was designed by Paul Pascoe and built by Messrs Husband Brothers.

The hall opening was attended by Governor General Fergusson and Mayor George Manning .

Wilkie & Bruce designed a new postmodern style interior refurbishment in 1993. This is particularly noticeable in the chapel which has a false barrel vault ceiling and abstract stained glass panes.

== List of ministers ==
- Robert Erwin (1883–1992)
- Donald F. MacKenzie (18 December 1946 – 31 May 1951)
- Malcolm Wilson (13 September 1951 – 1966)

== Gallery ==
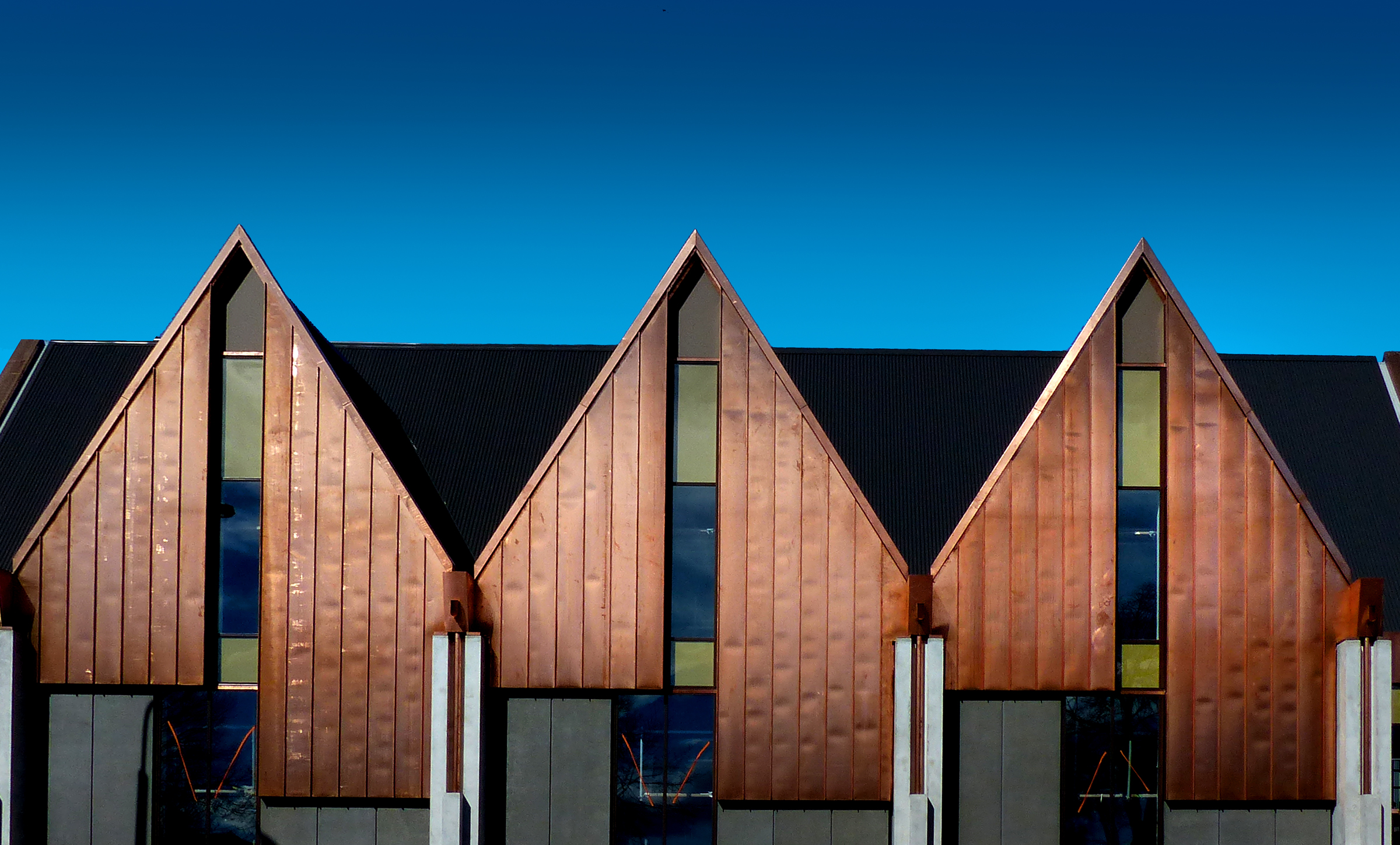
The restored church

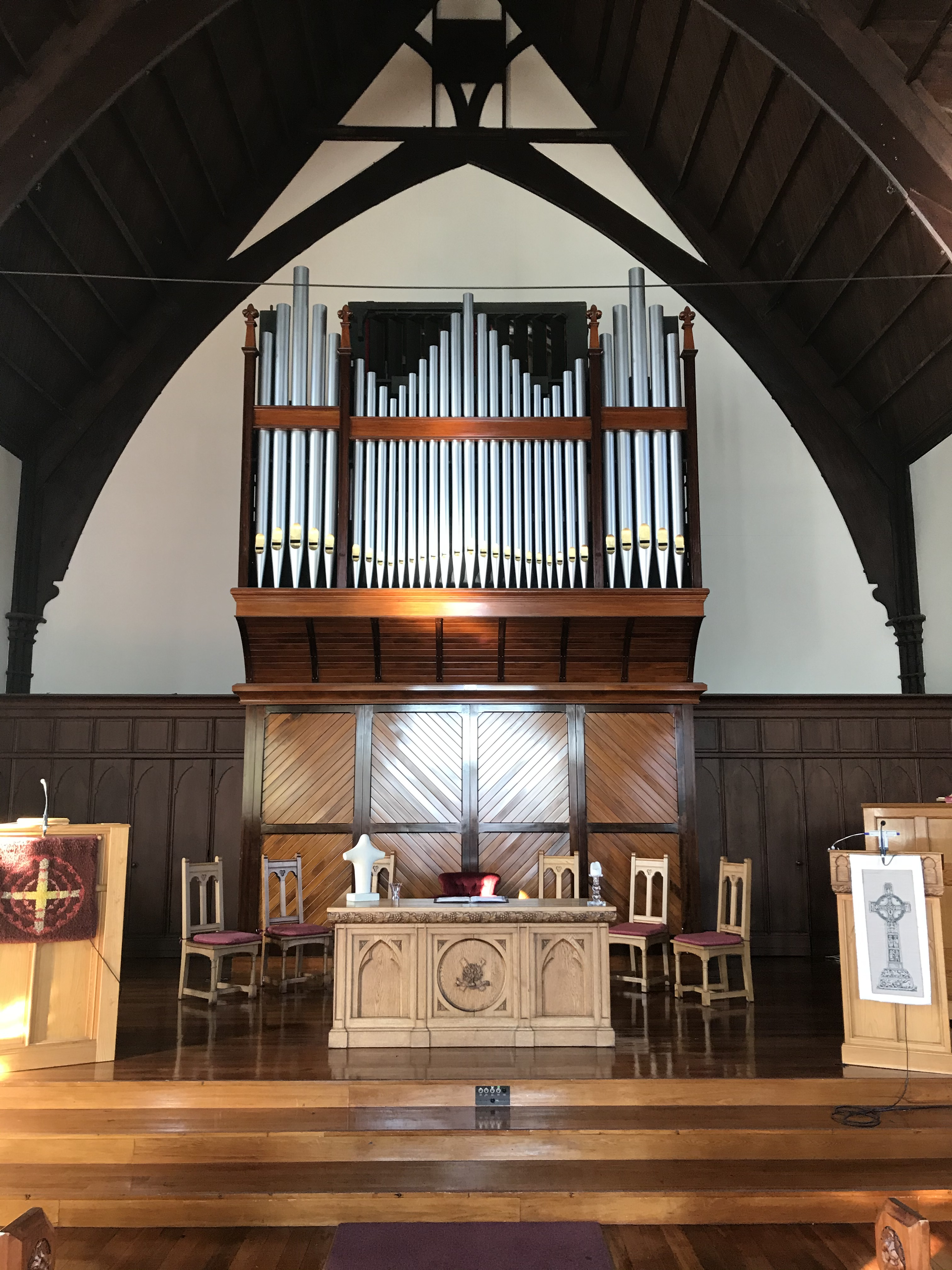
Altar

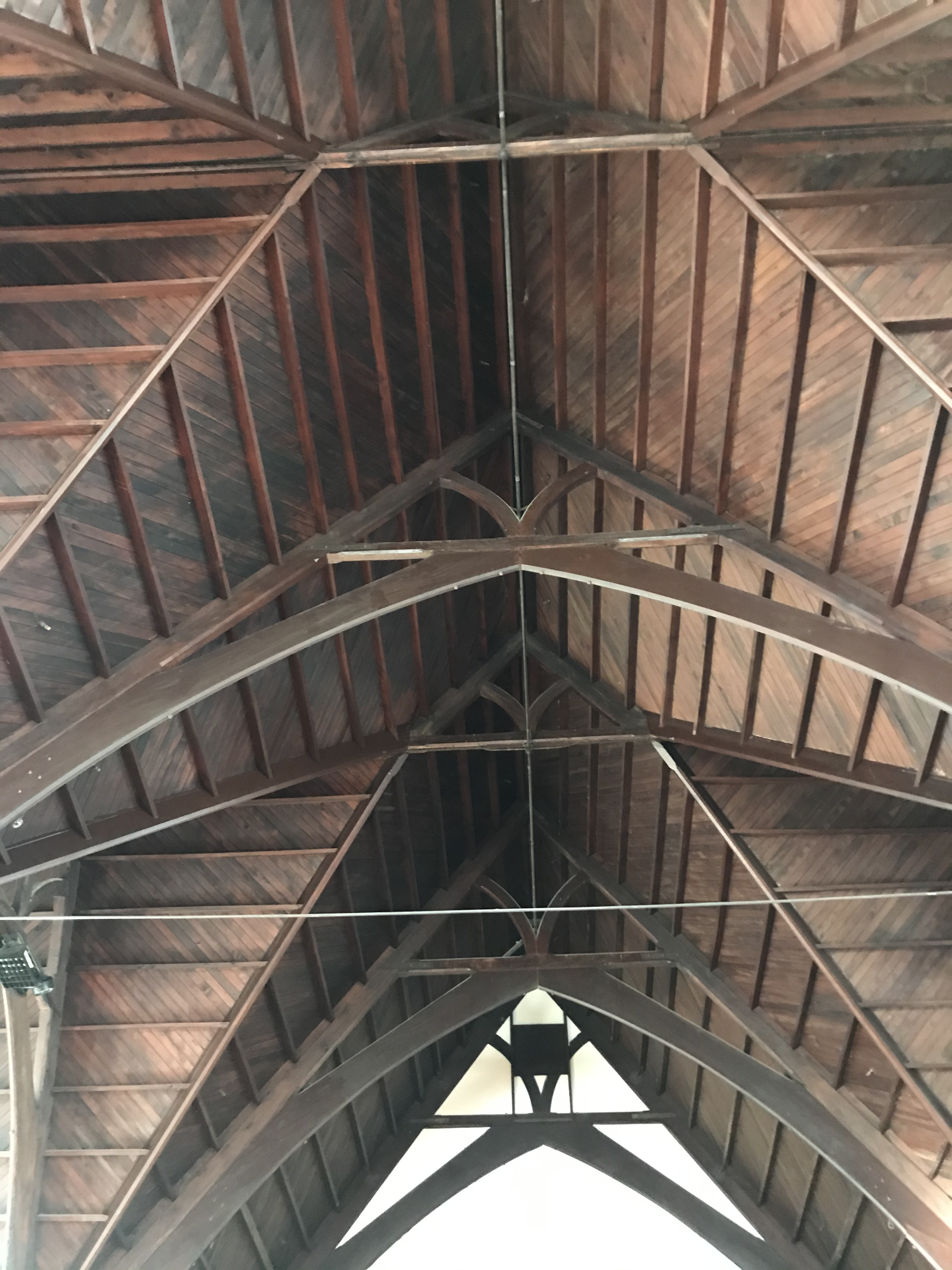
Ceiling

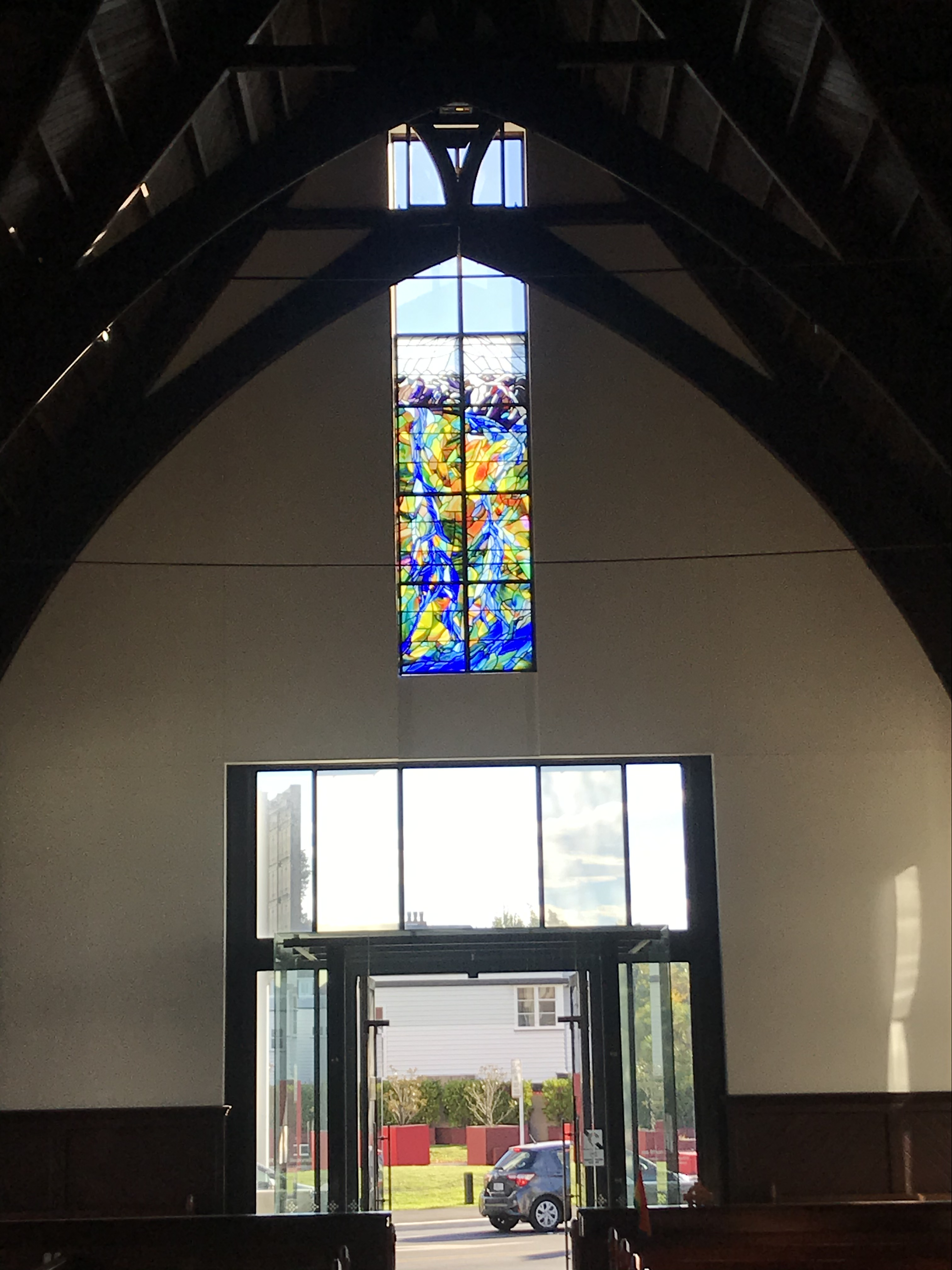
Stained glass above the Victoria St entrance

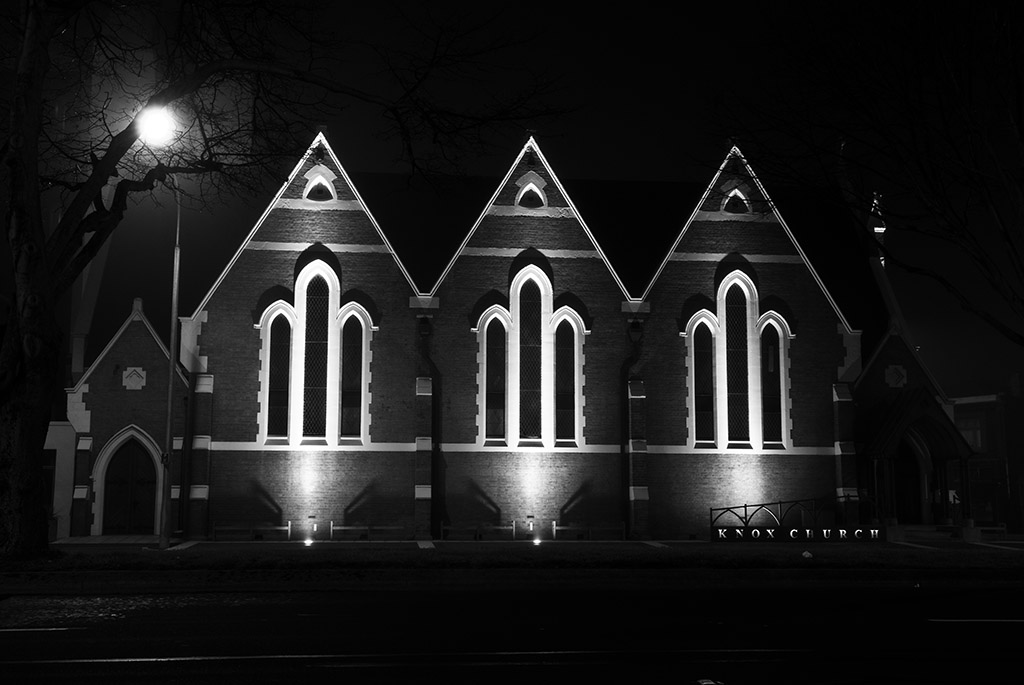
Church brick exterior, 2008

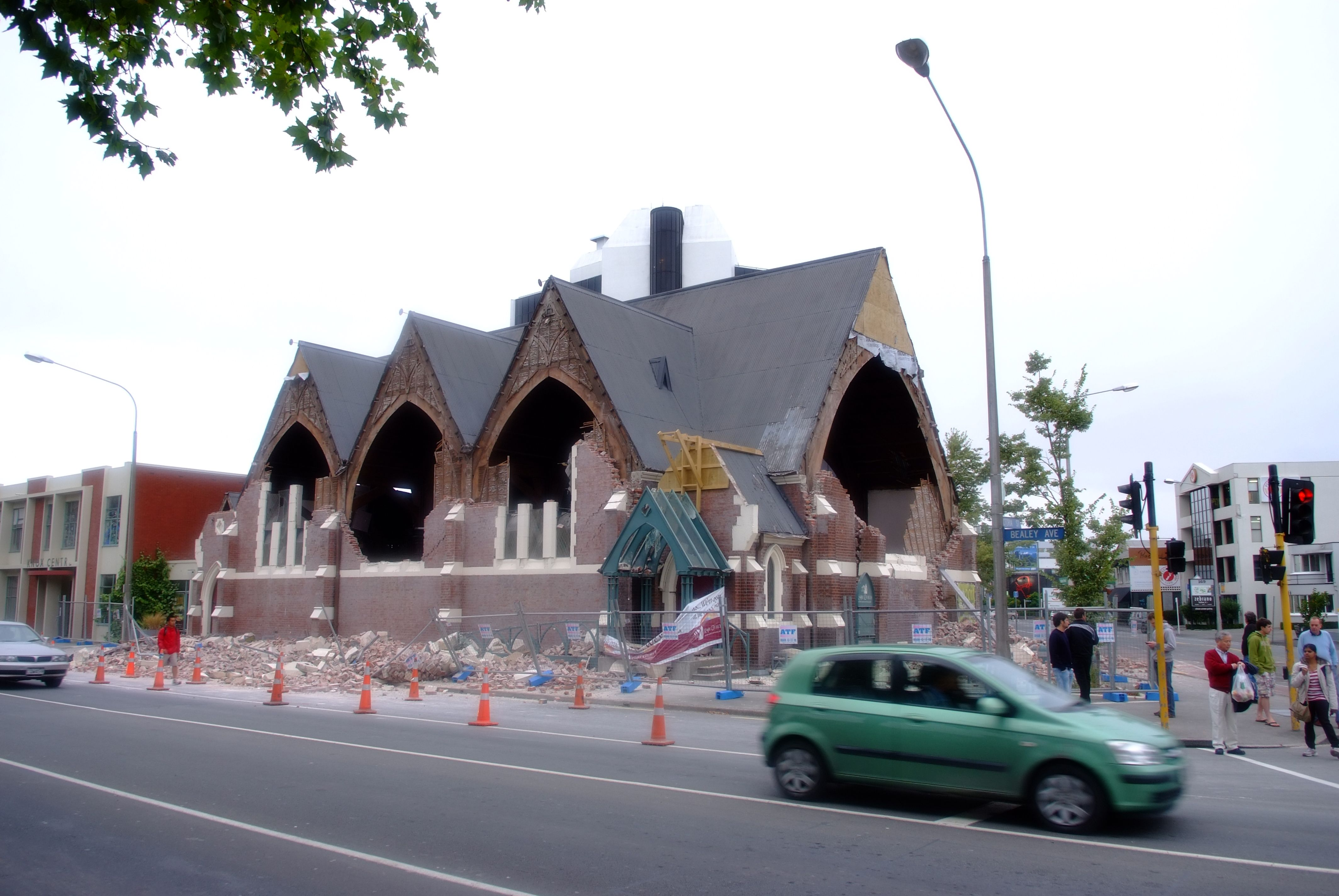
Church hours after the 2011 earthquake

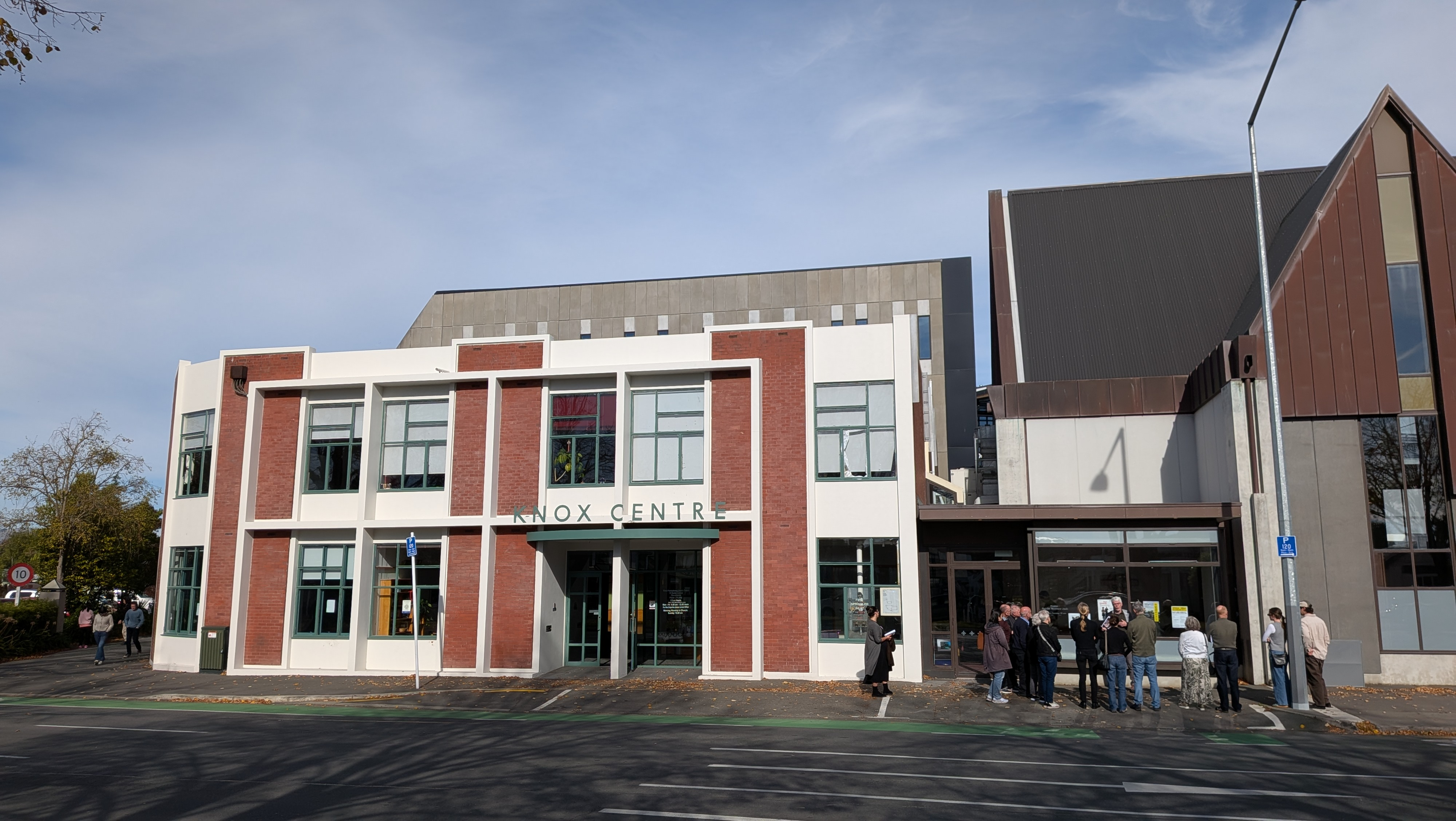
Knox Parish Hall exterior

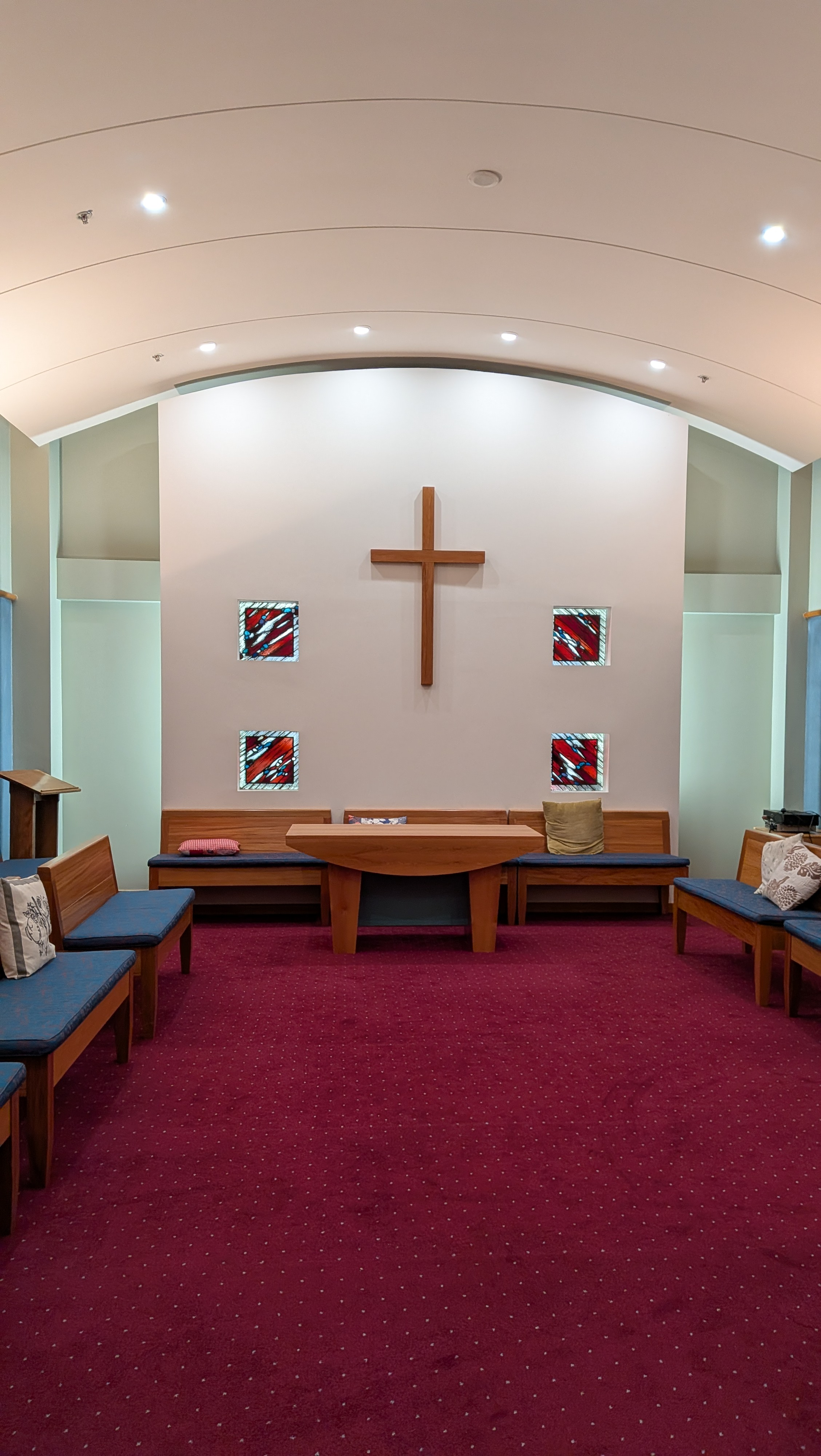
Chapel interior

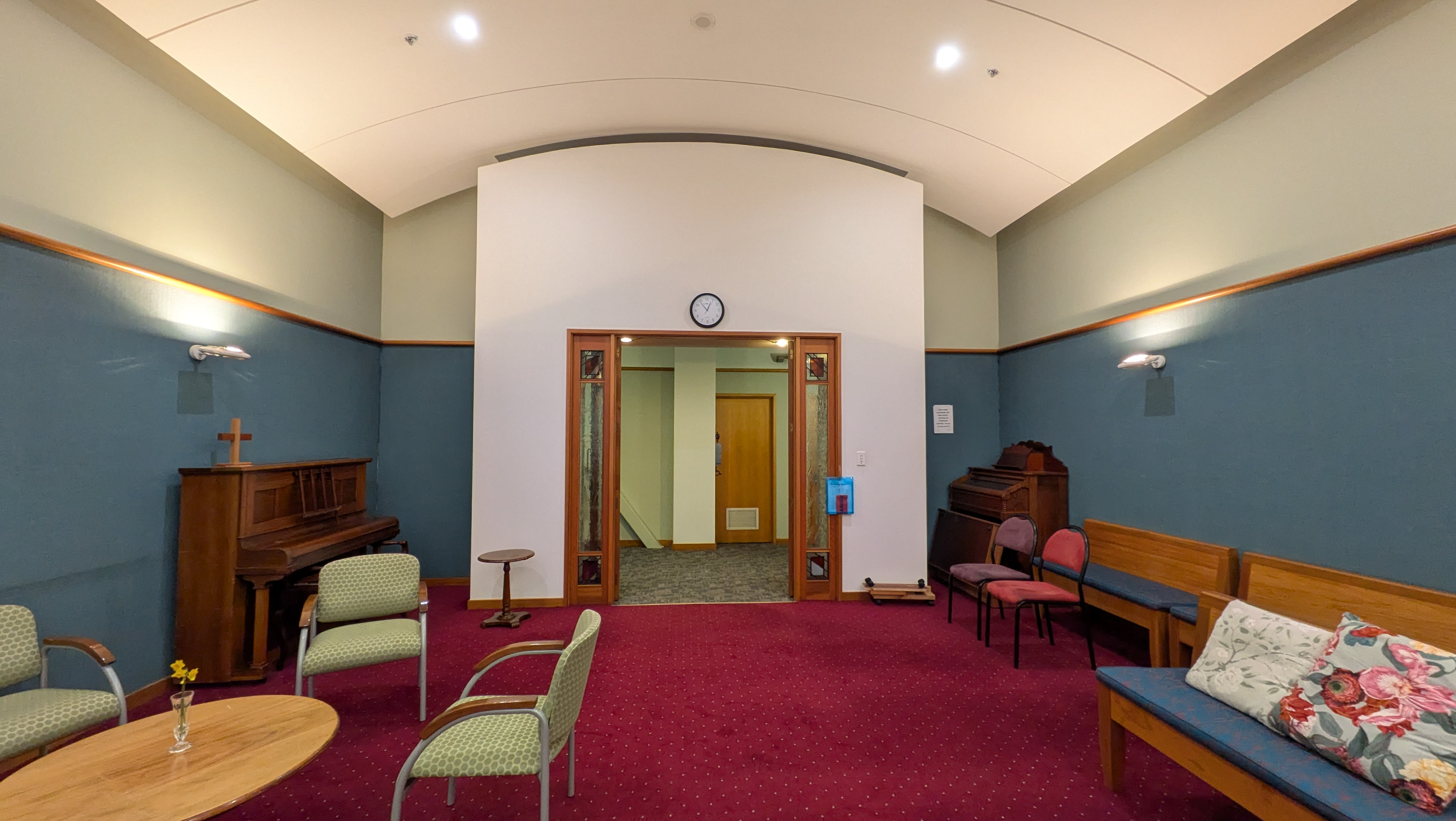
Chapel interior
