= Mark Braunias =

New Zealand painter (1955–2024)

- Born: Mark Colin Braunias; 20 August 1955; Tauranga, New Zealand
- Died: 17 December 2024 (aged 69); Hamilton, New Zealand
- Education: University of Canterbury Faculty of Arts
- Style: Abstract
- Website: Official website

Mark Colin Braunias (20 August 1955 – 17 December 2024) was a New Zealand semi-abstract painter who experimented with quilt making and glass blowing. He won the $25,000 Parkin Drawing Prize (2021) and two Wallace Art awards, and his work is held in important national art collections including Te Papa Museum, Christchurch Art Gallery, Dunedin Public Art Gallery and the Sarjeant Art Gallery. Braunias lived and worked in the coastal town of Kawhia, and the city of Hamilton. His younger brother is the writer Steve Braunias.

== Personal life ==
Braunias was born in Tauranga on 20 August 1955, one of four sons of Johann Braunias, an Austrian-born house painter. He attended Mount Maunganui College, and later worked at the Waterfront Industry Commission offices at Mount Maunganui wharf. After extensive travel, he returned to New Zealand to attend the Ilam School of Art in Christchurch. He graduated with a BFA from the University of Canterbury, Ilam School of Fine Arts, in 1988, the year of his first solo exhibition.

As a child Braunias was inspired by Mad magazine artists, in particular the legendary Bill Elder. His father Johann was also a painter. His brother Steve described his father’s work as "conservatively painted landscapes."

=== Illness and death ===
Braunias and three of his brothers suffered from atrial fibrillation, a condition causing an unsteady heartbeat. The combination of high blood pressure and the blood-thinning agents, which he needed for his condition, led to a high potential risk of a cerebral haemorrhage.

Braunias died from a cerebral haemorrhage at Waikato Hospital on 17 December 2024, at the age of 69.

== Career ==
Braunias lived and worked in a former Bank of New Zealand building in Kawhia, which he bought in 1996. He used the bank vault as his storeroom for canvases.

He was a prolific artist who exhibited frequently for more than three decades. He showed at the Peter McLeavey Gallery 13 times and the Jonathan Smart Gallery ten times. He also exhibited at Anna Miles Gallery, Dunedin School of Art, Bath Street Gallery, Brett McDowell Gallery, Ilam Campus Gallery, Gregory Flint Gallery, City Gallery Wellington, Robert McDougall Art Gallery, the Auckland Art Gallery, Dunedin Public Art Gallery, Southland Museum and Art Gallery, Tauranga Art Gallery, the Sarjeant Gallery, and the Christchurch Art Gallery, among others. His last exhibition was at the Ann Packer Gallery in Whanganui, in November 2024.

Jonathan Smart, owner of the Jonathan Smart Gallery in Christchurch, said Braunias made paintings "that lean towards abstraction that are also deeply human."

Braunias also worked as an art tutor at Unitec in Auckland between 1993 and 2013.

== Awards ==
- 1992: Paramount Award, the Wallace Art Awards
- 2010: Fulbright-Wallace Arts Trust Award
- 2021: Parkin Drawing Prize

== Art residencies ==
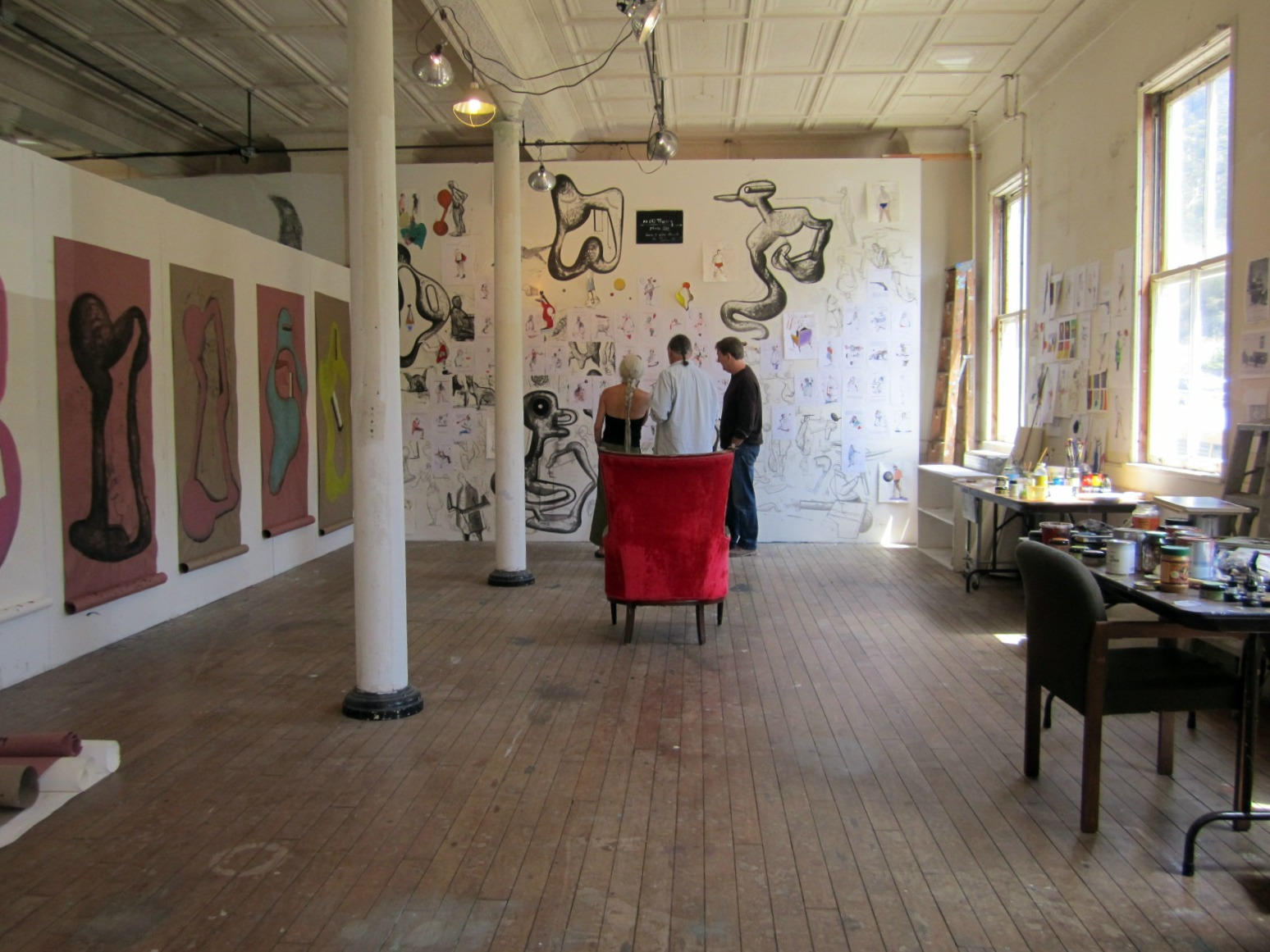
An exhibition by Braunias at Headlands Center for the Arts in San Francisco during the artist's residency in 2011. Braunias is the man on the right.

- 2002: Dunedin Public Art Gallery
- 2005: William Hodges Fellowship, Invercargill
- 2007: Tylee Cottage, Whanganui
- 2011: Fulbright/Wallace scholarship for a residency at the Headlands Center for the Arts, San Francisco.
- 2019: Dunedin School of Art

== Collections ==
The work of Mark Braunias is held in public gallery and private collections including Te Papa Tongarewa National Museum of New Zealand, Christchurch Art Gallery, Dunedin Public Art Gallery, The Sarjeant Art Gallery, Tauranga Art Gallery, Invercargill Art Gallery and Museum, Ashburton Art Gallery, University of Auckland, University of Canterbury, Massey University, Lincoln University, The Fletcher Trust Collection, Art House Trust Collection and the State Library of Queensland.
