= McLean's Mansion =

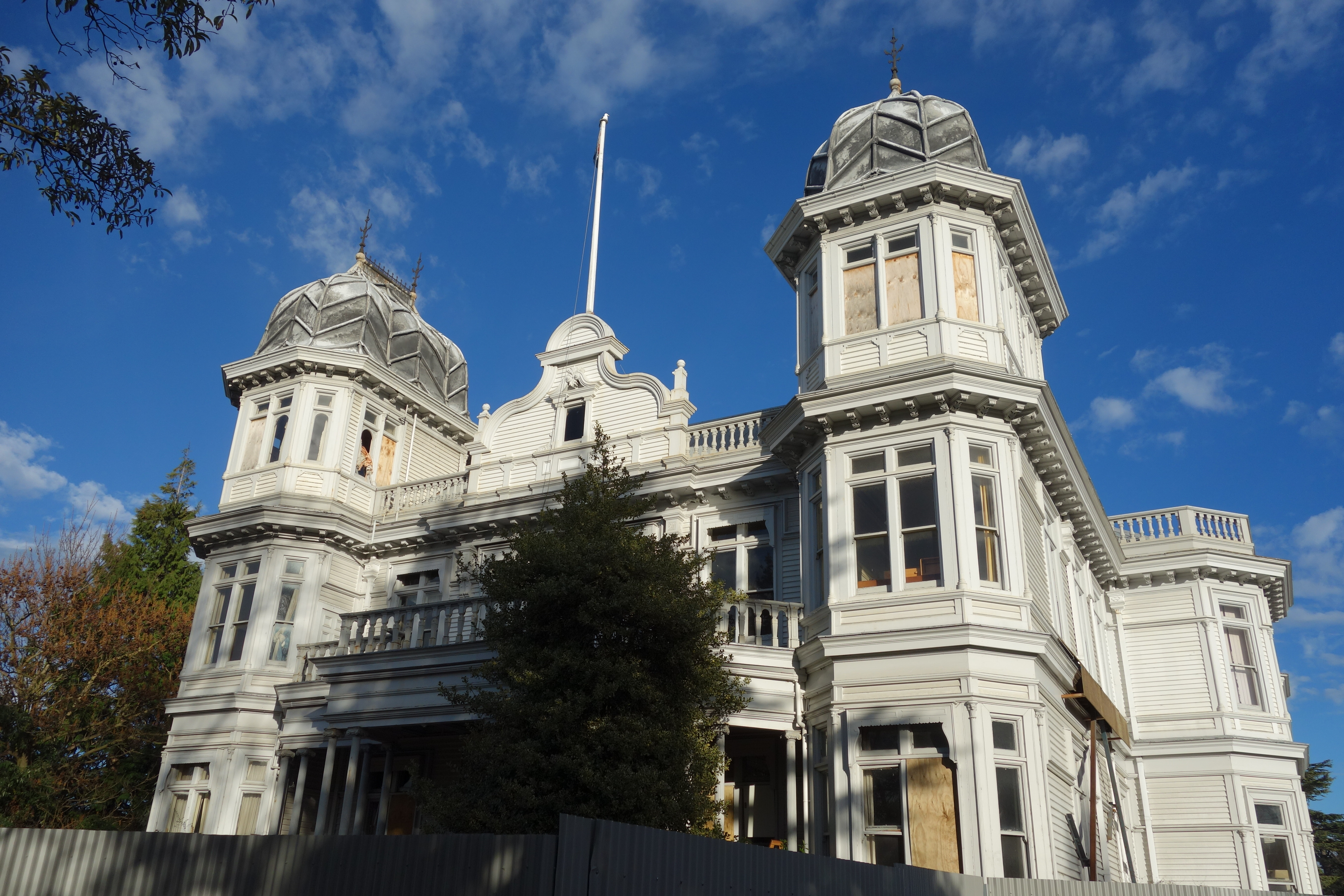
- McLean's Mansion in July 2013

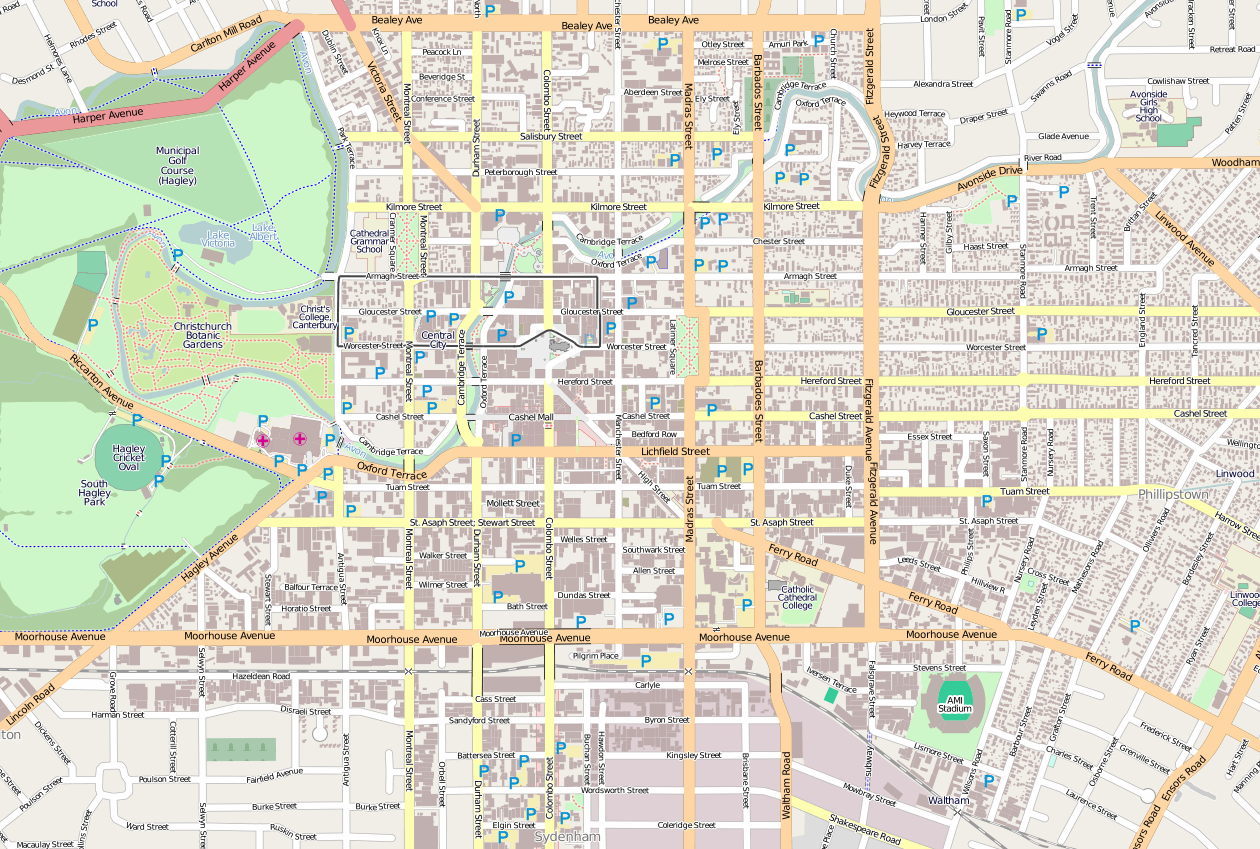
- Location within Christchurch
- Former names: Holly Lea

General information
- Type: Homestead
- Location: Christchurch Central City, 387 Manchester Street, Christchurch, New Zealand
- Coordinates: 43°31′20.4″S 172°38′19.2″E
- Completed: September 1900
- Client: Allan McLean

Design and construction
- Architect: Robert William England
- Main contractor: Rennie and Pearce

Heritage New Zealand – Category 1
- Designated: 7 April 1983
- Reference no.: 300

References
- "McLean's Mansion". New Zealand Heritage List/Rārangi Kōrero. Heritage New Zealand.

McLean's Mansion (originally Holly Lea) was a homestead in Christchurch, New Zealand. The two hectares property is situated between Manchester and Colombo Streets. The mansion was initially known as 'Holly Lea', but later became known as McLean's Mansion after its initial owner. It is the largest wooden residence in New Zealand. The mansion, designed by Robert England, architect of Christchurch, is a fusion of styles of Jacobean architecture and Victorian features, akin to the Mentmore Towers (1852–54) of Sir Joseph Paxton in Buckinghamshire in England. It was built between April 1899 and September 1900. The former house is registered as a Category I heritage building by Heritage New Zealand. After the 2011 Christchurch earthquake, the owners applied to demolish the earthquake-damaged buildings, but their request was denied by the heritage body and the courts. In December 2016, the building sold to a trust that will restore it for use as a gallery. Restoration is expected to be finished by 2026.

== History ==
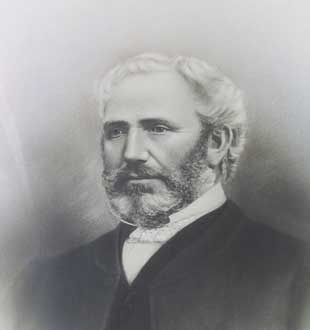
Portrait of Allan McLean.

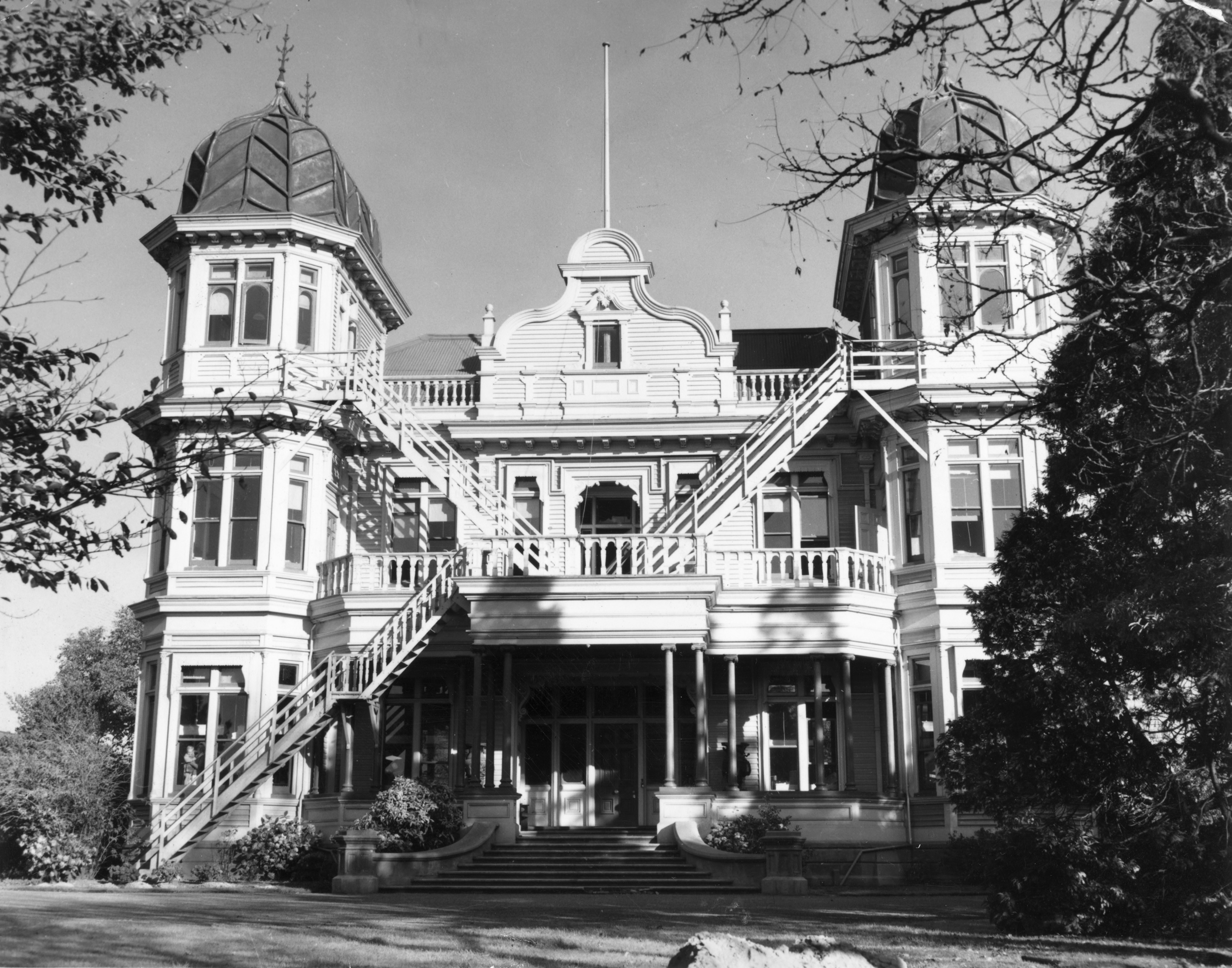
Holly Lea, 1956.

Designed by Robert England, it was built of kauri by Rennie and Pearce builders between April 1899 and September 1900. It was the largest wooden residential structure in New Zealand at that time. It was constructed for the Scottish philanthropist and immigrant, Allan McLean, when he was 78 years old and he lived in it for the remaining seven years of his life. The building was registered on 7 April 1983 as a Category 1 heritage building.

== Interior design ==
=== Architecture and fittings ===
The mansion is built to a rectangular plan in Jacobean style, with three stories. The structure's concrete foundation is to a depth of 3 feet (0.91 m) over a pile foundation of 3 by 2 feet (0.91 m × 0.61 m). It has a floor area of 23,000 square feet (2,100 m^{2}). The 53 rooms include 19 bedrooms, nine bathrooms, and six servant rooms. The wall frames are of kauri wood fixed with wall plates. The floor is made of wooden joists and sleepers. The dwangs are fixed in an angular direction to give a wavy appearance. The roof domes are made of iron sheets and the pinnacles are of cast-iron crestings, a French design feature. Corrugated iron sheets are used for the roof. The water gutter heads and pipes for draining rain water from the roof are also made of cast iron, though the pipes probably were fitted later, in 1915. The chimneys are also provided but their heights were curtailed at some later stage.

The interior fittings are elaborate and ornamental, typical of a Jacobean house. The crafting of the interior ceilings, plasters, mouldings and balustrades is the handiwork of Christchurch artisans. The ceiling depicts roses with mouldings of simple design at the wall corners. The two rooms on the ground floor near the entrance have elaborate coffered ceilings with a well-carved, gilded, central decorative. The top part of the doors in each of the main rooms has a well-ornamented wooden tympanum. The balustrades of the staircase and the newel post have been featured with thistles and flowers, an emblem of Scotland (a reminder of the owner's homeland). The newel posts in particular have carvings of acanthus leaves and beading; brass lights which decorate the posts are also fitted over them.

The furnishings were of an exclusive design chosen specially by the housekeeper and a fabric expert from Paris. The wall fabrics are of satin brocade in apricot cream colour; they were also fitted under the expert's guidance. The walls of the drawing hall, next to the outer hall, were very elegantly furnished with satin fabrics featuring "buttoned braiding at the skirting boards". Numerous lights, elegantly designed, were fitted on the walls and ceilings. The white marble fitted fireplace, fixed with ornate brass, completed the scene. The staircase in the hall was fitted with a red carpet and the walls of the hall were embellished with coloured velvet fabrics. The dining room walls were covered with curtains made with satin fabrics which added to the grandeur of the dining room along with an elaborate chandelier and a fireplace fitted with black marble. The silver room was fitted with shelves, from flooring to the roof, filled with "tureens, entry dishes, epergnes, teapots and cutlery". The fittings in the bathroom were all made of brass, and the bathtubs were of porcelain.

=== Furniture ===
At the entrance stood two elaborately carved hat stands. These were in the form of a 7 feet (2.1 m) mahogany tree trunk with branches embossed with a traditional design of bear and cub. The drawing room displayed a mirror bordered with polished mahogany which was fitted with bronze and marble statues. The grandfather clock was a display item in the room. The settees, high backed and in a wing shape were upholstered in a burgundy colour. The ornamental chairs were fitted with regency brocade fabrics while a Persian carpet was a striking feature of the room. A retractable table was also part of the drawing room furnishings. Paintings of Victorian, Flemish and Scottish landscapes were hung from rods in the main rooms on the ground floor and also in the gallery on the first floor. The dining room was fitted with a large table made of oak to seat 14 people, with all related fittings in the room also made in oak. The green and gold dinner service with monogram of A.L. formed part of the dining room cutlery, and the crockery consisted of large dishes to serve turkey and trout. The foyer and the inner hall had high mirrors and velvet curtains. Greenery was added to the setting of the halls and main rooms in the form of potted plants.

After the mansion was sold to the government in 1955, most of the furniture and furnishings were carted away, though some were kept at the McLean Institute.

== Recent history ==
=== Threat of demolition ===
The building suffered significant damage in the 2011 Christchurch earthquake and on 13 July 2013, The Press announced that the building was to be demolished. Just like the last time a Category I heritage building was proposed for demolition (Cranmer Court), this caused an immediate outcry by the community. The Canterbury Earthquake Recovery Authority (CERA) was criticised for having issued a section 38 (demolition) notice, given that the building is set back from the road by a long distance is thus not posing a threat to the public; a section 38 notice overrides the requirement for a heritage building to go through a public consultation process before it can be demolished. CERA was satisfied that the owners had exhausted all funding options for repair, which was disputed by the Canterbury Earthquake Historic Buildings Fund. The organisation's chair, former Christchurch City Councillor and art historian Anna Crighton, stated that despite having given several million dollars for various projects, they have never been approached by the owners of McLean's Mansion. A strongly-worded editorial in The Press criticised the "scanty justification for its tearing down", described the proposal as "unnecessary destruction", and accused CERA of being "cavalier". CERA's CEO, Roger Sutton, defended his organisation's actions and explained that safety is its primary focus. Heritage preservation is not one of CERA's focusses, and if the community wanted to preserve buildings, then CERA would not stand in the way of that. Two days later, Sutton reconfirmed that CERA is "in no hurry to have the place pulled down". Crighton was heartened by the response and stated that she has never been contacted by so many people about preserving a building apart from the Cathedral.

The owners did not manage to find a buyer for the damaged building and applied in 2013 to Heritage New Zealand for demolition consent but the organisation denied the request. The owners appealed to the Environment Court and in mid-2016, it became known that the court had upheld the Heritage New Zealand decision, stating that "the owners did not lack alternatives that could substantially reduce the cost of undertaking restoration". The court further found that McLean's Mansion has "very high historical and cultural heritage value that justifies protection". In December 2015 the local newspaper The Press published photos from inside the building, taken by a group of urban explorers.

=== Change of ownership ===
In August 2018, McLean's Mansion sold to a trust after receiving financial support from Christchurch City Council (CCC), who allocated an entire financial year's central city heritage grant funding (NZ$1.9m) towards the repair. The trust received the purchase price itself as an interest free loan from a family trust. The interior fittings removed in the 1950s are, according to the trustee Trevor Lord, in "jaw dropping" condition and have been offered for sale to the trust. Purchase and restoration will cost about NZ$12m, and the trust hopes to have the first part of the building open to the public within nine months of repair work starting. The trust intends to use the building as an art gallery and for music performances. It will show part of James Wallace's private art collection. The original trustees were businessman Trevor Lord, artist Philip Trusttum, curator Warren Feeney, and architect David Sheppard; all are Christchurch residents. The current trustees are Chris Kissling, Brian Cribb, Trevor Lord and Timothy Hogan. In 2022, it was reported that Wallace became involved in the trust, became its chairman and financed the restoration, which is expected to be finished in 2024.

== See also ==
- List of historic places in Christchurch
