= Bing Dawe =

New Zealand painter

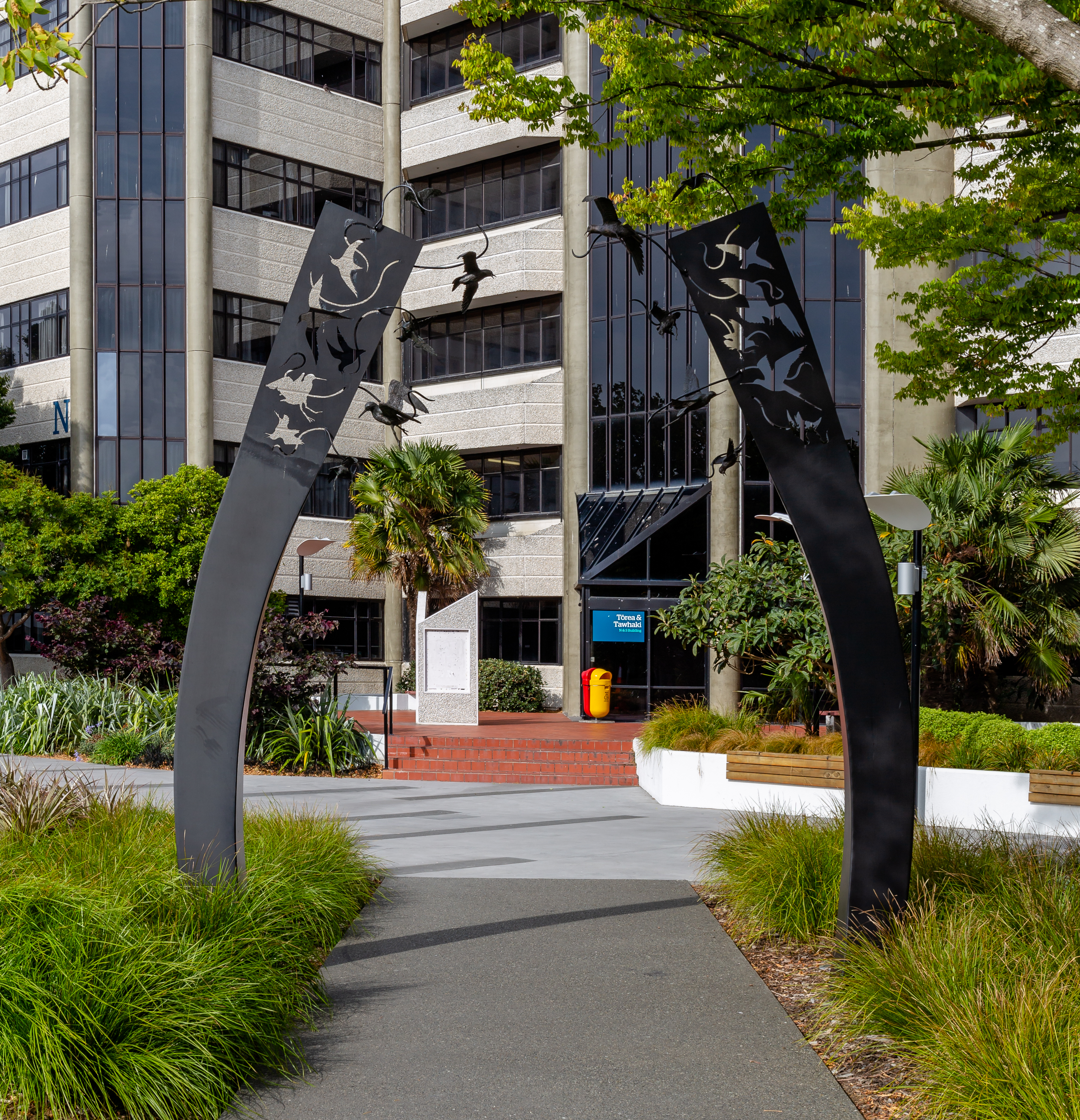
Diverting. Defending. Birds over the Waimakariri

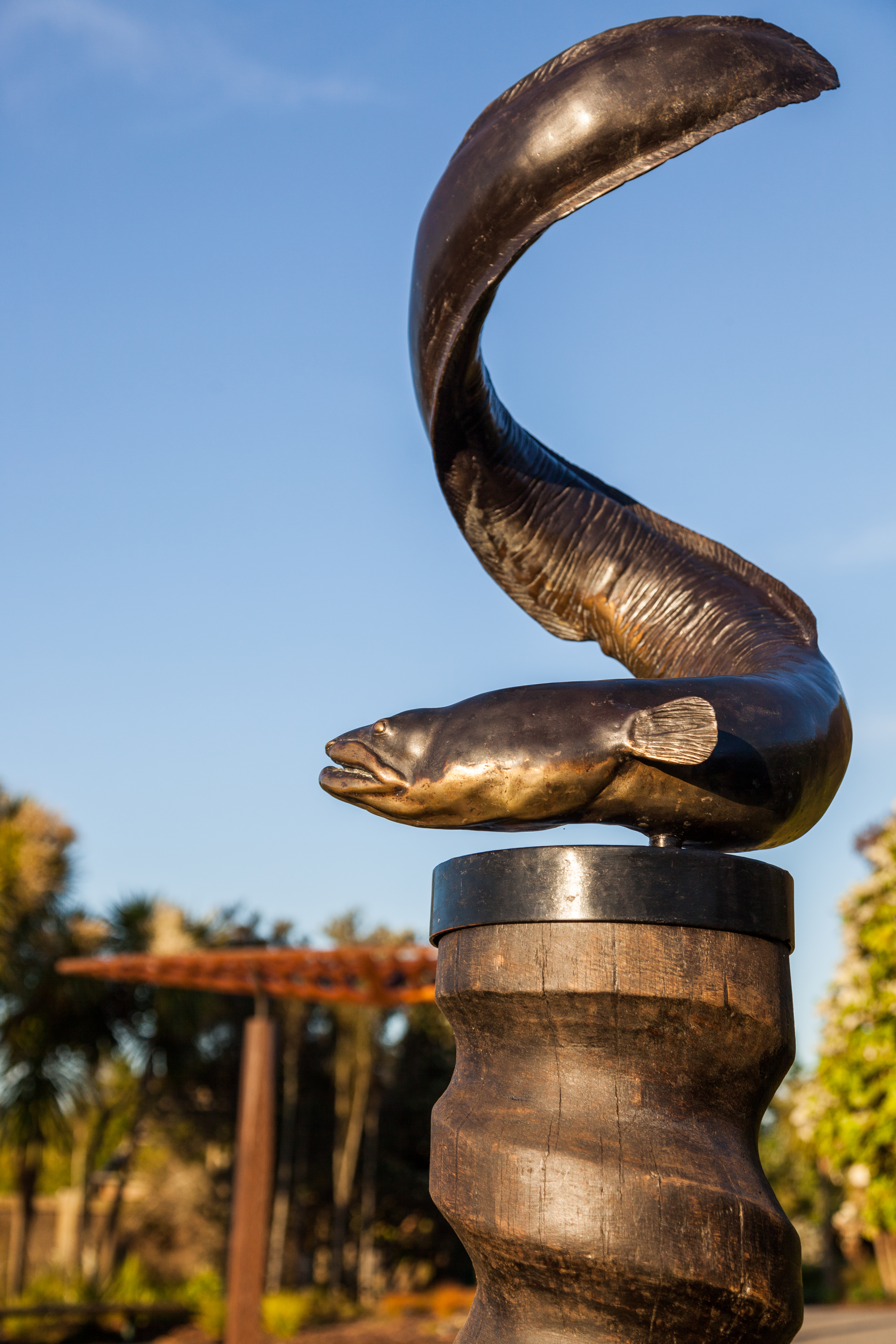
Tuna (2013), a sculpture of a New Zealand longfin eel located at the Auckland Botanic Gardens

Bing (Brian) Dawe (born 1952) is a New Zealand artist and sculptor. His art typically embraces significant environmental issues.

== Biography ==
Dawe was born in Glenavy, South Canterbury, New Zealand in 1952. He graduated from the University of Canterbury, School of Fine Arts in 1976 where he studied under Tom Taylor. As well as being an acclaimed artist with works on display in galleries throughout New Zealand, Dawe was also an educator beginning in 1989 at Christchurch Polytechnic (now Ara Institute of Canterbury) as the Programme Co-ordinator of Craft Design. After 28 years of teaching at Ara Institute of Canterbury, Dawe retired in August 2017. Around the same time he completed a 3D cast bronze work for Ara's North Green gateway called Diverting. Defending. Birds over the Waimakiriri.

== Awards ==
- 2013 Friends Acquisition Award, Sculpture in the Gardens, Auckland Botancial Gardens, Auckland, New Zealand.
- 2010 People's Choice Award, Sculpture in the Gardens, Auckland Botanical Gardens, Auckland New Zealand.
- 1999 Paramount Award, Wallace Art Awards, New Zealand
- 1995 Arts Excellence Award, Trust Bank Canterbury, NZ Residencies

== New Zealand Public Commissions ==
- 2018 Piwakawaka fantail over the Liffey (Landscape with too many holes series) commissioned by Lincoln Community Committee and located outside Lincoln Library, Christchurch.
- 2015 Waiting for St Francis - A gateway, bronze and steel (Landscape with too many holes series) commissioned by Tai Tapu Sculpture Garden founders
- 2005 From the draining (Eels on hoop) commissioned by Christchurch City Council for Parklands Library
- 2001 Out of the black water, kauri and steel, located in the old Christchurch Boys’ High School Building, The Christchurch Arts Centre Te Matatiki Toi Ora commissioned by Scape Public Art

== Bibliography ==
- Dawe, B., Walter, K. & Emery, J. (2013). Vanishing point: three artists present an evocation of the Mackenzie Basin: Bing Dawe, Keith Walter, John Emery. ISBN 978-0473265755
- Attwood, P., Fountain, M. & Massey, C. (2015). Medal artists of New Zealand: regroup, reflect, regenerate; 25th anniversary exhibition.Curated by Marté Szirmay.
- Dawe, B. (1999). Bing Dawe: Acts of Enquiry. Robert McDougall Art Gallery. ISBN 0-9088-7452-9
