= Peter Stichbury (potter) =

New Zealand potter

Peter Stichbury MNZM (10 March 1924 – 24 March 2015) was a studio potter from Auckland, New Zealand.

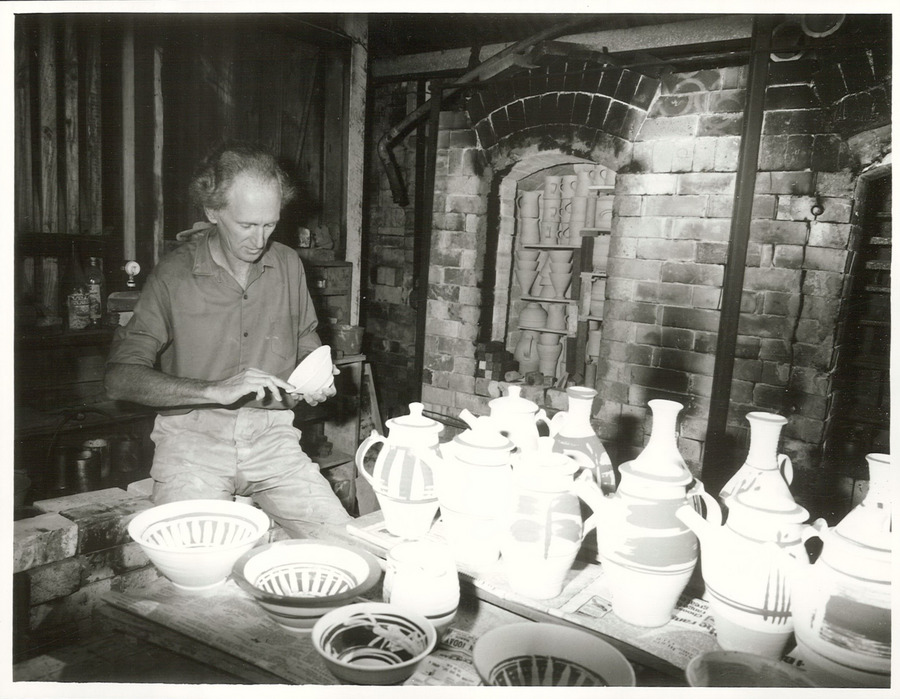
Peter Stichbury checking pottery

== Biography ==
Stichbury was born in 1924. In 1957, he was the first recipient of a fellowship from the Association of New Zealand Art Societies, which is now Creative New Zealand, and went with his wife Diane to St Ives, Cornwall, England to study with Bernard Leach. From there, he went to Africa and was Michael Cardew's first western student in Abuja in Nigeria. These overseas periods were a source of inspiration for his work. Stichbury set up the pottery department at Ardmore Teachers College. His pottery was given to Queen Elizabeth II during her 1974 royal tour to New Zealand.

While Stichbury is mostly known for his pottery he also built musical string instruments (cellos, violas) in his later years. The work of Stichbury was honoured by exhibitions at the Auckland Museum in 2004 and the New Zealand National Museum Te Papa in 2011/12.

In the 2002 Queen's Birthday and Golden Jubilee Honours, Stichbury was appointed a Member of the New Zealand Order of Merit, for services to pottery. Stichbury died on 24 March 2015, survived by his wife Diane and three children.
