= Peter Stichbury (artist) =

New Zealand artist (1969)

Peter Stichbury (born 1969 in Auckland) is a New Zealand artist. Stichbury graduated from the Elam School of Fine Arts, University of Auckland, in 1997. He won New Zealand’s prestigious Wallace Art Awards the same year. Stichbury is primarily a painter but his body of work also spans the mediums of drawing, watercolour, sculpture and sound based work. Stichbury is most renowned for his intricate yet flat portraits of models and modern beauties sourced from contemporary media images. Stichbury is represented by the New York gallery Tracy Williams, Ltd. In 2019 a painting by Stichbury fetched $67,270 NZD at auction.

== Influences ==
Stichbury is influenced by modern psychology and sociology, alien conspiracy theory, popular culture and historical painters including Jean Auguste Dominique Ingres and Lucian Freud.
