= Southland Art Foundation =

The Southland Art Foundation, established in 1995, is a Southland, New Zealand, art foundation that provides funding for a variety of art programs and scholarships for New Zealand artists. It was the successor to the Trustbank Southland Art Foundation, created by former Southland Museum and Art Gallery Chairman, Dr Alf Poole CBE and former Southland Museum and Art Gallery Director, Russell Beck.

== Southland Art Foundation Artist in Residence and William Hodges Fellowship ==
The Southland Art Foundation 'Artist in Residence' programme began in 1996, having been proposed and developed by Michael A R Anderson, Head of Art Faculty, Southern Institute of Technology and by Wayne P Marriott, Art Gallery Manager, Southland Museum & Art Gallery, .

Southland had previously hosted a number of one off opportunities for New Zealand artists to work in the region, during the 1980s. These had been the work of Russell Beck and Dr Alf Poole, former Director and former Chair, Southland Museum and Art Gallery. This culminated in 1990 with the Art in the Sub-Antarctic programme, which provided an opportunity for Bill Hammond, Geerda Leenards, Shaun Burdon, Chester Nealie, Helen Mitchell, Lloyd Godman and Laurence Aberhardt, amongst others to participate in the joint Museum and DOC residency on the Sub-Antarctic Islands. Godman proposed the concept of the project as far back as 1984 and was instrumental in the organization as was Lou Sanson, Conservator for the Southland Conservancy in charge of Fiordland National Park, Stewart Island and the Subantarctic World Heritage Area.

Anderson saw the residency as an opportunity to expose the Southland community, and the students of the Southern Institute of Technology, to the creative genius of some of New Zealand's greatest living artists.

Artists are required to spend time at the Southern Institute of Technology and also to work in and around Southland.

In 1999 the Trustees—Shirley Palmer, Gwen Neave, Russell Beck and Wayne P Marriott—resolved to rename the Artist in Residence programme the William Hodges Fellowship. This was in recognition of the acquisition of William Hodges "Maori before a Waterfall", 1773, by the Southland Museum and Art Gallery in 1998. Hodges was regarded as the first artist in residence in Southland, having depicted the flora, fauna and people of the region during Captain Cook's second voyage to New Zealand.

Southland Art Foundation Artist in Residence

- 1996: Ans Westra, Photographer; Irene Ferguson, Printmaker; Ruth Myers, Sculptor; Geoff Dixon, Painter; Tracy Collins, Painter;
- 1997: Kalvin Collins, Abstract Painter; 1997 Mark Adams, Photographer; Geoff Dixon, Painter;
- 1998: David Sarich, Painter; John Z Robinson, Painter; Janet de Wagt, Painter; Joanna Margaret Paul, Painter; Murray Grimsdale, Painter/Illustrator;
- 1999: Murray Grimsdale, Painter/Illustrator; Jo Ogier, Printmaker; Cilla McQueen, Poet/Painter

William Hodges Fellows

- 2000: Jo Ogier, Printmaker; Margaret Dawson, Photographer; Nicholas Twist, Photographer;
- 2001: Ross T Smith, Photographer; Margaret Dawson, Photographer;
- 2002: Irene Ferguson, Painter/Printmaker; Laurence Berry, Painter; Lorraine Webb, Painter;
- 2003: Maryrose Crook, Painter/Musician;
- 2004: Keely McGlynn, Glass Sculptor; Jane Zusters, Painter; Lucy Dolan, Painter;
- 2005: Mark Braunias, Painter;
- 2006: Regan Gentry, Sculptor; Miranda Parkes, Painter
- 2007: James Walker, Glass Sculptor; Peter Peryer, Photographer;
- 2008: Anna Muirhead, Mixed Media/Installation; Ana de Lancy Terry and Don Hunter, Mixed Media Artists;
- 2009: Ana de Lancy Terry and Don Hunter, Mixed Media Artists
- 2010: Deborah Barton, Artist
- 2011: Robyn Belton, Illustrator; Max Bellamy, Artist; Jo Torr, Artist
- 2012: Heather Straka, Painter; Gary Freemantle, Painter
- 2013: James Robinson, Artist
- 2014: Sam Mitchell, Artist
- 2015: Stephen Mulqueen, Sculptor

== Burwell House ==
In 2000, Burwell House, a former 1878 Doctors residence of Invercargill Public Hospital was converted into a residence and studio for artists, and officially opened by Hon. Judith Tizard, Associate Minister, Arts, Culture and Heritage that year.

The original architect was F W Burwell; Burwell House was constructed in 1879.

The Southland Museum and Art Gallery leased the property in 1988 and undertook some external restoration on the buildings. It used the Central Block for storage and in 2000 refurbished the South Wing for use as the accommodation for the artist-in-residence program.

== Southland Art Foundation Art Scholarship ==
- Cory Hughes, of Gore (Otago Polytechnic School of Art)
- Jacqui Byars, of Gore (Otago Polytechnic School of Art)
- Joshua McMillan, of Invercargill (Otago Polytechnic School of Art)

== Exhibitions ==
- Jade (curated by Russell Beck )
- Art in the Subantarctic (curated by Russell Beck )
- 1994, Anthony Stones: Familiar Faces (curated by Wayne P Marriott)
- In Hodges Wake (curated by Wayne P Marriott )
- From Hodges, to Hodgkins, to Here (curated by Wayne P Marriott )

== Bibliography ==
- William Hodges: http://wwar.com/masters/h/hodges-william.html
- David Sarich: http://www.bowengalleries.co.nz/htm/bios/sarich.html
- Joanna Margaret Paul: http://www.art-newzealand.com/Issue108/paulobit.htm
- Cilla McQueen: http://www.otago.ac.nz/news/news/2008/13-05-08_press_release.html
- Margaret Dawson: http://www.artists.co.nz/margaretdawson.htm
- Ross T Smith: http://www.rosstsmith.co.nz/curriculum.html
- Laurence Berry: http://www.whangareiartmuseum.co.nz/exhibitions/past/2005/takitimu_longitude.html
- Lorraine Webb: http://www.quayschool.ac.nz/cv/lorraine_webb.html
- Miranda Parkes: http://www.vavasourgodkin.co.nz/artists/bio.php?artist=Miranda+Parkes
- James Walker: http://www.walkerjames.com/index.html
- Peter Peryer: http://www.artsfoundation.org.nz/peryer.html
- Joshua McMillan: http://www.studioworks.co.nz/artist-12.html
- Anna Terry: http://www.otagopolytechnic.ac.nz/fileadmin/DepartmentalResources/Academic/Art/Programmes/MFA/MFA_Candidates/Ana_Terry/anaterrycv.pdf
