= Tyla Vaeau =

Master tattooist in New Zealand

- Born: Auckland, New Zealand
- Education: Elam School of Fine Arts, University of Auckland
- Known for: tatau

Tyla Vaeau is a master tattooist (Samoan: tufuga, tātatau) of Samoan (Sale’a’aumua, Aleipata and Safune, Savai’i) and Pākehā (New Zealand European) descent. In 2019, she was awarded the Creative New Zealand Emerging Pacific Artist award. She was the first Samoan female tattooist to be gifted the customary Samoan tattooing tool, the 'au, from the Sa Su'a family – one of the leading families of tattooists in Samoa.

== Biography ==
Vaeau was born in Wellington but grew up in the central Auckland suburb of Grey Lynn. Her father was born in the village of Elisefoe in the island of Upolu, Samoa, and her mother was born in Wellsford, New Zealand.

She attended Westmere Primary, Ponsonby Intermediate, and then Western Springs College from 1999 to 2003. Vaeau notes that these schools were diverse and multicultural when she attended them in the 1980s and 1990s. Throughout school, she was known for her artistic abilities, and by high school, she began to design tattoos for friends and family.

She went on to study a conjoint Bachelor of Arts in Art History and a Bachelor of Fine Arts from Elam School of Fine Arts, graduating in 2009. In 2009, she started tattooing with machine, then progressed to using customary Samoan tattoo tools to learn traditional tattoo techniques (Samoan: tatau). Later, in 2017, she completed a Master of Arts in Art History at the University of Auckland, her thesis focusing on Samoan tatau and its development within the Samoan diaspora as a travelling practice. Her interests are particularly on New Zealand and Australian-born women who are trying to reconnect with their Samoan heritage.

Vaeau worked at the female and Indigenous- owned tattoo studio Karanga Ink on Karangahape Road but now works with her brother from her home in Grey Lynn. She is known widely for her ability to blend contemporary with traditional artistic practice. Her combination of understanding the historical and cultural relevance and significance of the Samoan malu (female leg tatau) and the pe'a (male leg tatau) has resulted in her ability to create her own contemporary designs. In order to expand her practice into malu, Vaeau has managed the training of a small circle of women. She is part of a community of people actively revitalising this practice.

She has been part of several cultural tattoo festivals, notably attending the 2017 Traditional Tattoo and World Culture Festival in Mallorca and the 2018 Tatau I Mo'orea Festival in Tahiti.

=== Tatau ===
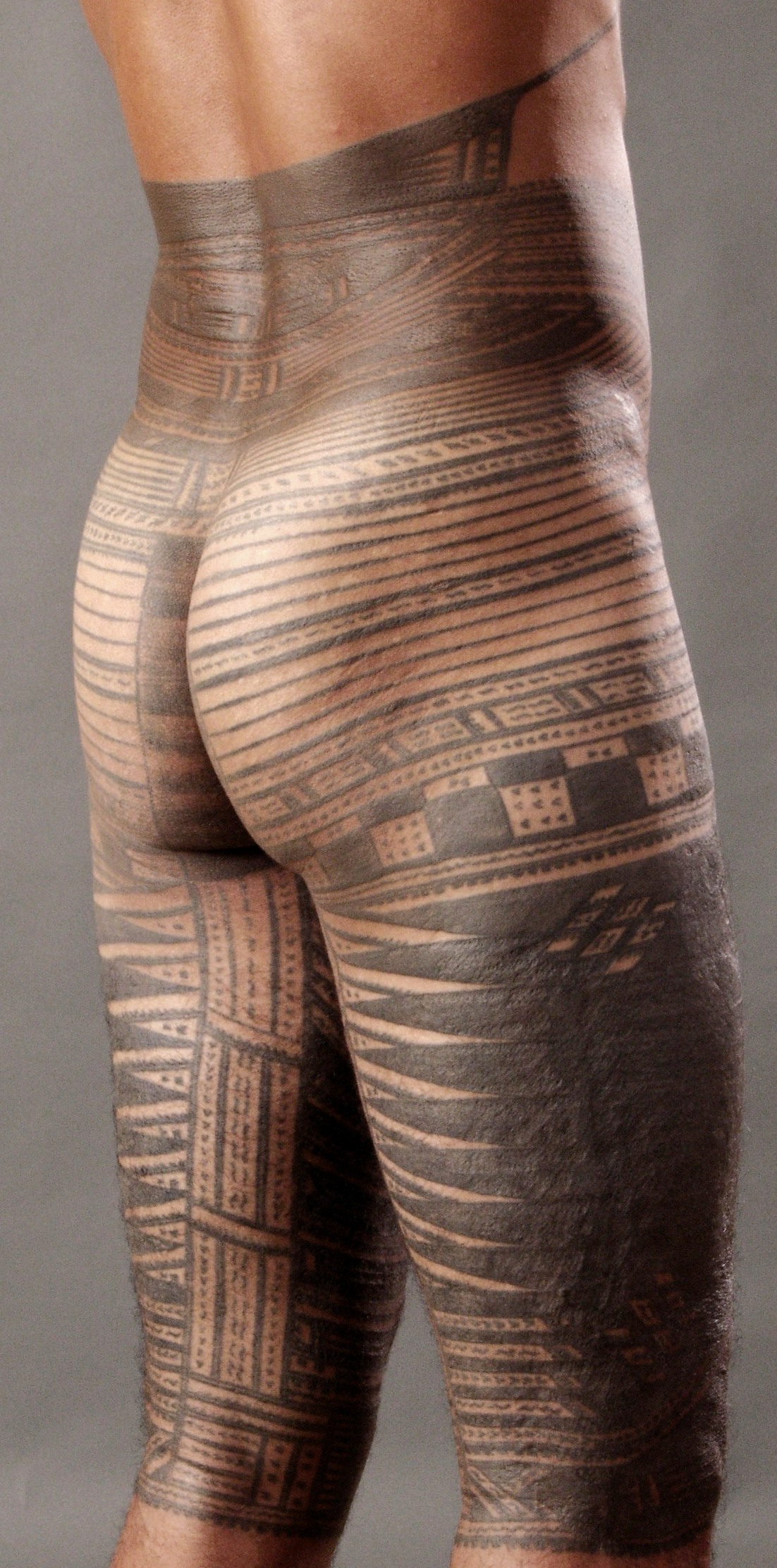
An example of the male tatau (pe'a)

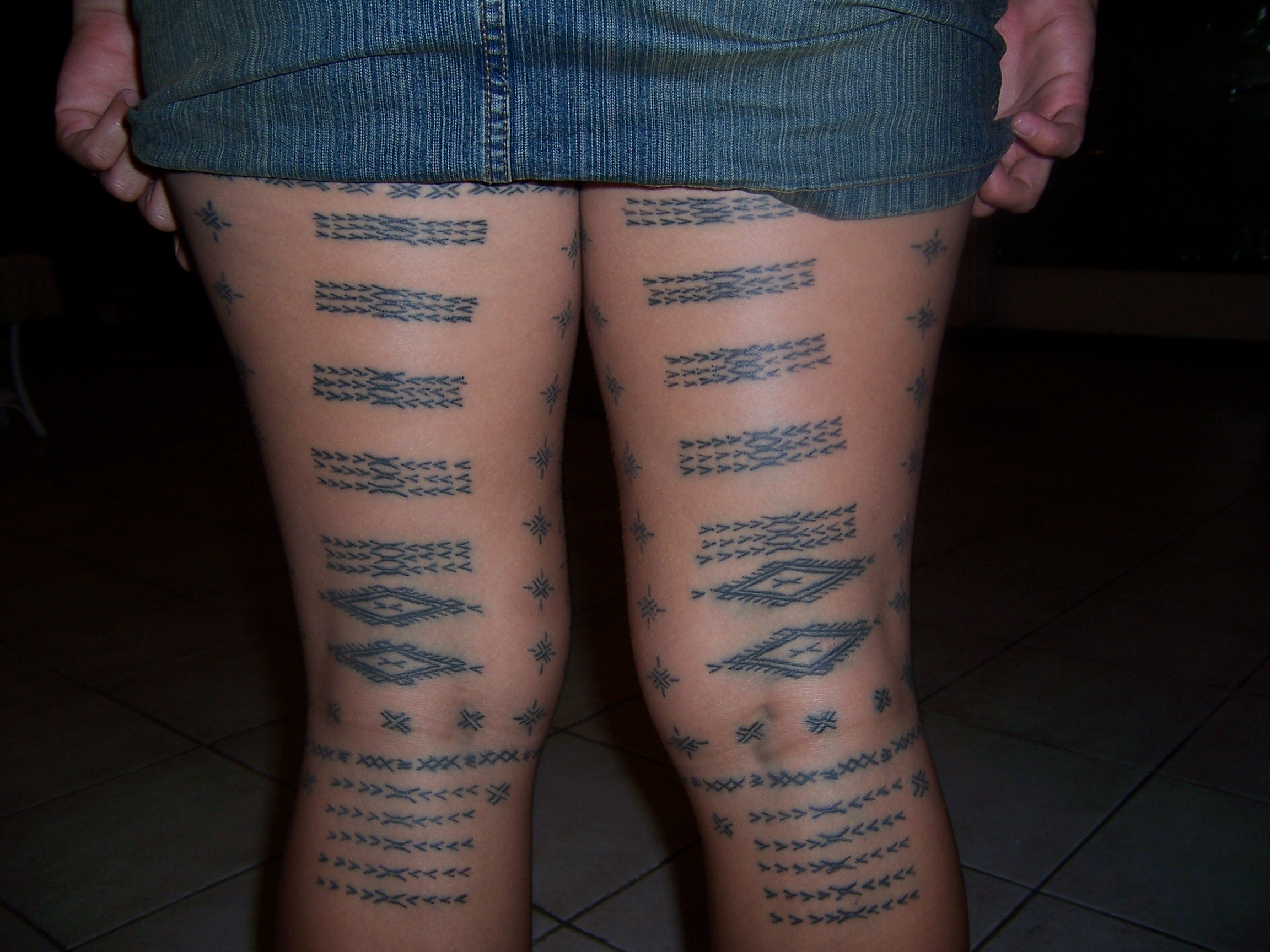
An example of the female tatau (malu)

The word "tattoo" comes from the Samoan tatau. However, it is not a direct translation, as the word tatau holds a deep significance in its practice. Customarily, the tatau is done following ceremonial protocol, with each individual motif holding meaning based on the holder's family lineage, culture, and deep-rooted history. Tatau is a way to uphold tradition and honour family and the villages that they are connected to. The ancient symbols used in tatau relate to and represent family, place, navigation, and journey. Vaeau works with these symbols daily to help individuals connect with their heritage and identity, share their stories, and honour their oral histories through the markings on their skin.

The Samoan legend of sisters Taema and Tilafaiga tells the story of how the art of tatau came to Samoa from Fiji, explaining tatau was originally for women, but the sisters mixed up the chant on their return to Samoa and gifted it instead to the men. As such, the skill of tatau has traditionally been passed down from father to son, making the large majority of master tattooists in Samoan culture men. At present, there is a team of Samoan women tattooists undertaking this traditional practice of tatau, and Vaeau is the only female master tattooist, a title she acquired after years of being an apprentice under the master tattooist Sa Su'a family.

=== The Creative New Zealand Emerging Pacific Artist award ===
Vaeau was awarded the Creative New Zealand Emerging Pacific Artist award in 2019, an annual award that recognises excellence in Pacific arts. Specifically, this award recognises the promise and potential of an emerging artist at an early stage in their career. The recipient receives $7,500, which is intended to help the artist develop their career in their chosen field.
