= William Hodges Fellowship =

The William Hodges Fellowship residency programme is the successor to the Southland Art Foundation Artist in Residence.

The origins of the William Hodges Fellowship date back to 1980 with the establishment of the Southland Savings Bank Art Foundation. The Southland Art Foundation Artist In Residence was established in 1996 by a joint partnership between Southland Art Foundation, Creative New Zealand, Southland Museum & Art Gallery and the Southern Institute of Technology.

In 1999 the Southland Art Foundation Trustees–Shirley Palmer, Gwen Neave, Russell Beck and Wayne P, Marriott resolved to rename the Artist in Residence programme the William Hodges Fellowship. This was in recognition of the acquisition of William Hodges “Maori before a Waterfall”, 1773 by the Southland Museum & Art Gallery in 1998. Hodges was regarded as the first non-Maori artist in residence in Southland, having depicted the flora, fauna and people of the region during Cook’s second voyage to New Zealand.

The inaugural William Hodges Fellowship was awarded to Jo Ogier, printmaker, from Dunedin in 2000.

On Friday 3 November 2000 Burwell House was opened as the residence for the William Hodges Fellow.

The partnership of Southland Museum and Art Gallery, Southland Art Foundation, Southern Institute of Technology, and Creative New Zealand has continued to develop the fellowship, providing the opportunity for artists to work financially unencumbered for a period of time, as well as working closely with the local community.

== Artists/Fellows in Residence ==
- 1996 Ans Westra, Photographer
- 1996 Irene Ferguson, Printmaker
- 1996 Ruth Myers, Sculptor
- 1996 Geoff Dixon, Painter
- 1996 Tracy Collins, Painter
- 1997 Kalvin Collins, Abstract Painter
- 1997 Mark Adams, Photographer
- 1997 Geoff Dixon, Painter
- 1998 David Sarich, Painter
- 1998 John Z Robinson, Painter
- 1998 Janet de Wagt, Painter
- 1998 Joanna Margaret Paul, Painter
- 1998 Murray Grimsdale, Painter/Illustrator
- 1999 Murray Grimsdale, Painter/Illustrator
- 1999 Jo Ogier, Printmaker
- 1999 Cilla McQueen, Poet/Painter
- 2000 Jo Ogier, Printmaker
- 2000 Margaret Dawson, Photographer
- 2000 Nicholas Twist, Photographer
- 2001 Ross T Smith, Photographer
- 2001 Margaret Dawson, Photographer
- 2002 Irene Ferguson, Painter/Printmaker
- 2002 Laurence Berry, Painter
- 2002 Lorraine Webb, Painter
- 2003 Maryrose Crook, Painter/Musician
- 2004 Keely McGlynn, Glass Sculptor
- 2004 Jane Zusters, Painter
- 2004 Lucy Dolan, Painter
- 2005 Mark Braunias, Painter
- 2006 Regan Gentry, Sculptor
- 2006 Miranda Parkes, Painter
- 2007 James Walker, Glass Sculptor
- 2007 Peter Peryer, Photographer
- 2008 Anna Muirhead, Mixed Media/Installation
- 2008 Ana Terry & Don Hunter, Mixed Media Artists
- 2009 Nic Moon
- 2010 Deborah Barton
- 2011 Robyn Belton, Illustrator
- 2011 Max Bellamy, Artist
- 2011 Jo Torr, Artist
- 2012 Heather Straka
- 2012 Gary Freemantle
- 2013 James Robinson, painter
- 2014 Sam Mitchell, painter
- 2015 Stephen Mulqueen, sculptor
- 2018 Anita de Soto, painter
- 2022 Daegan Wells, sculptor
- 2022 Kyla Cresswell, printmaker
