= Immune and Implicated =

Implicated and Immune: Artists' responses to AIDs was a 1992 visual art exhibition organised in New Zealand as a response to the AIDS epidemic.

== The exhibition ==
Implicated and Immune was curated by Louis Johnston (now Louis Le Vaillant) at the Fisher Gallery in Pakuranga (now Te Tuhi). The first exhibition in Auckland to respond to the AIDS crisis, the exhibition featured work by John Barnett, Jack Body, Fear Brampton, Lillian Budd, Malcolm Harrison, Lesley Kaiser, Philip Kelly, Richard Killeen, Lily Laita, Steven Lovett, Richard McWhannell, Fiona Pardington, John Reynolds, Richard Wearns and Jane Zusters.

Some works in the exhibition dealt explicitly with the topic of AIDS: Philip Kelly's Aids Timeline, for example, presented a text-base chronology of major events in the history of HIV/AIDs in New Zealand, beginning with an article published in OUT! magazine in 1983. Works by Richard McWhannell, Steven Lovett, Malcolm Harrison and Jane Zusters expressed personal grief or elegised men who had died of AIDs-related illnesses. Other works, such Richard Killeen's Burial Mound and John Reynolds' The Cause of the Movement of the Heart were less directly related to the theme of the exhibition.

Writing in the arts journal Art New Zealand, critic and artist Giovanni Intra noted the exhibition stemmed from the desire to improve the understanding of HIV/AIDs in the wider community:

Thus, the exhibition view AIDS as a social as well as biomedical phenomenon, an epidemic of signification, the effects of which extend far beyond the risks of contagion. The show called for an artistic practice that would reach the various communities which have special concerns in this area.

Intra concluded that the exhibition 'succeeded in presenting a sophisticated and diverse commentary, a variety of takes on the issue of AIDS in New Zealand, but that it also did seem, however, to under-represent the communities that it referred to, groups which were critical to its development. For instance, in the exhibition there was no real acknowledgement of the New Zealand AIDS Foundation and the Prostitutes' Collective. There was no Safe Sex or testing information available inside the Gallery. Film screenings were a very exciting but unfortunately unrealizable idea.'

An accompanying publication included writing on AIDS, art and society by Tim Walker, queer culture and AIDS by Rex Pilgrim, the New Zealand AIDS quilt project by Darren Horn and reproductions of New Zealand AIDS Foundation safe sex posters.

== 2015 re-staging ==
In January 2015 Auckland dealer gallery Michael Lett showed Implicated and Immune, a reprise of the 1992 exhibition. The exhibition included work by artists included in the original exhibition (including Richard Killeen, John Reynolds and Fiona Pardington) and work by other artists (including Julia Morison, choreographer Douglas Wright, Imogen Taylor, Ava Seymour and Grant Lingard). A major feature of the show were photographer Fiona Clark's four large photo-albums Living with AIDS, made between 1988 and 1989. The albums document the lives of people living with AIDS, through photographs and hand-written notations.
