= Ans Westra =

New Zealand photographer (1936–2023)

Ans Westra CNZM
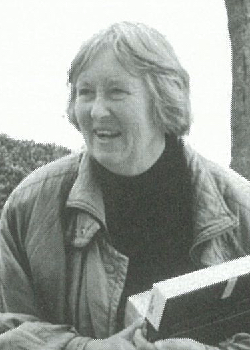
- Westra in 2000
- Born: Anna Jacoba Westra; 28 April 1936; Leiden, Netherlands
- Died: 26 February 2023 (aged 86); Wellington, New Zealand
- Notable work: Washday at the Pa (1964)

Anna Jacoba Westra CNZM (28 April 1936 – 26 February 2023), known as Ans Westra, was a Dutch-born New Zealand photographer, well known for her depictions of Māori life in the 20th century. Her prominence as an artist was amplified by her controversial 1964 children's book Washday at the Pa.

== Early life and education ==
Westra was born in 1936 in Leiden, Netherlands, the only child of Pieter Hein Westra and Hendrika Christina van Doorn.

In 1953, Westra moved to Rotterdam and began study at the Industrieschool voor Meisjes. She graduated in 1957 with a diploma in arts and craft teaching, specialising in artistic needlework, and the same year, she left the Netherlands for New Zealand. She became a naturalised New Zealand citizen in 1963.

== Career ==
=== Initial interest in photography and move to New Zealand ===
Westra first encountered photography as a teenager through her stepfather. In 1956 she was inspired by a visit to the international exhibition The Family of Man in Amsterdam, together with the 1955 book by Johan van der Keuken, Wij Zijn 17 (We Are Seventeen) which depicted the lives of post-war Dutch teenagers. She began saving money so that she could purchase a high-end Rolleiflex camera, which she used for many years after.

In 1957, age 21, Westra travelled to New Zealand to visit her father who had already moved to the country. She stayed in Auckland and worked for eight months at Crown Lynn Potteries; she later returned to take photographs of the factory in 1963.

=== Wellington and professional photography ===
In 1958, Westra moved to Wellington, where she joined the Wellington Camera Club and worked in various local photographic studios. In 1960, Westra received international recognition winning a prize from the UK Photography magazine for her work entitled Assignment No. 2. That same year Westra had her first photograph published in New Zealand on the cover of Te Ao Hou / The New World, a magazine published by the Department of Maori Affairs. In 1962 she began working as a full-time, freelance documentary photographer. Much of her early work was for the School Publications Branch of the Department of Education and Te Ao Hou. On 21 June 1978 she documented the final day of the intervention art Vacant Lot of Cabbages and in 1979 she photographed the Ben Burn Park Concerts that were part of Summer City (Wellington).

=== Washday at the Pa and broader recognition ===
Westra lived with rural Māori for five months, photographing typical daily life, and in 1964 her school bulletin Washday at the Pa was published by the school publications section of the Department of Education and distributed to primary school classrooms throughout New Zealand. The book documents a large Māori family at their rural home in Ruatoria. The family was given the fictitious name "Wereta", and listed as living "near Taihape" to protect their identities.

The living conditions of the family were seen as poor and their rural cottage rundown. Concerns were raised, including by the Māori Women's Welfare League, that the depiction of the Weretas would lead readers—impressionable children—to see the family as representative of all Māori. The league requested its withdrawal from schools, and soon after its release the journal was withdrawn by order of the Minister of Education at the request of the league.

Later in 1964 Washday at the Pa was republished privately by the Caxton Press, with 20 additional photographs. An article written by academics in Auckland in 2016 about this event states: "In a way the book, and the feelings it inspired, appealed strongly to Pākehā ideas of Māori, more so than it reflected some important truth about Māori themselves." In 1967 Maori was published with photography by Westra and text by James Ritchie. In 1972 Notes on the Country I Live In was published as the result of a project Westra undertook with support from the QEII Arts Council to photograph the people of New Zealand. The book includes text by James K. Baxter and Tim Shadbolt. 1972 was also the year of Westra's first solo exhibition, which was held at the Dowse Art Gallery.

In 1982 an archive of Westra's negatives was established at the Alexander Turnbull Library, Wellington. In the late 1980s and 1990s, Westra undertook several artist-in-residences including at the Dowse Art Museum, Lower Hutt (1988–89), the Tylee Cottage Residency, Wanganui (1993) and in 1996, she was awarded the inaugural Southland Art Foundation Artist in Residence award by Southland Art Foundation, Southern Institute of Technology, Southland Museum and Art Gallery and Creative New Zealand. In 1998 Westra was artist-in-residence at the Otago School of Fine Arts, Otago Polytechnic.

In 2006 Westra was the subject of a 71 minute documentary directed by Luit Bieringa. Ans Westra: Private Journeys / Public Signposts played at the NZ International Film Festival and was nominated for a Qantas Media Award. Bieringa who like Westra emigrated to New Zealand from the Netherlands was commissioned by TVNZ to produce a 46 minute version of the documentary for TV One’s Artsville series.

Westra's 2009 book and exhibition, The Crescent Moon: The Asian Face of Islam in New Zealand features her own photographs, with text by New Zealand writer Adrienne Jansen. The book's interviews and photographs of 37 individuals give insights into the lives of Asian Muslims in New Zealand. Washday at the Pa was reissued in 2011 by Suite Publishing to include other photos of the same family taken in 1998. In May 2013, Suite Publishing released Westra's publication: Our Future: Ngā Tau ki Muri, which includes 137 often damning photographs of the New Zealand landscape, with text contributions from Hone Tuwhare, Russel Norman, Brian Turner, David Eggleton and David Lange.

Between February 2013 and April 2014, Westra undertook her Full Circle Tour to revisit centres where she had been particularly active during her career. She visited Ruatoria, Ruatoki, Rotorua, the Whanganui River, Kaitaia, Invercargill and Stewart Island.

In 2014, the digitization of Westra's archive of negatives held at the Alexander Turnbull Library, Wellington, came into effect through her representative, Suite Tirohanga. Around 10,000 of Westra's work prints are held in the collection of Te Papa.

She died at her home in Wellington on 26 February 2023, at the age of 86.

== Honours and awards ==
Westra received a Certificate of Excellence from the New York World’s Fair photographic exhibition in 1964–1965. Westra was the Pacific regional winner of the Commonwealth Photography Award in 1986, travelling to the Philippines to photograph and then onwards to the United Kingdom, the Netherlands and America. In the 1998 Queen's Birthday Honours, Westra was appointed a Companion of the New Zealand Order of Merit, for services to photography, and in 2007 she became an Arts Foundation of New Zealand Icon artist. In 2015, Westra received an honorary doctorate from Massey University in recognition of her long-standing contribution to New Zealand’s visual culture.

== Westra Museum ==
On 20 April 2016, a museum in Wellington was established, dedicated to Westra's work. This was in association with the dealer gallery Suite. In 2024 Suite Gallery set up a repository of Westra's belongings with the intention to hold exhibitions and community events.

== Criticism ==
Westra faced criticism for her ownership of her images of Māori, that she built her career on images of Māori and that the subjects and their relations are not able to use the photographs without asking Westra for permission. The content being through a Pākehā gaze is also criticised including the controversy of Washday at the Pa. Another criticism was that Westra did not always stop to record the names of the people whose photographs she took. An attempt to rectify this, in 2024, involved the Suite Gallery in Wellington and Westra's family. Photos taken by Westra, appearing on bill boards and on social media in Wellington, encouraged people to get in touch if they knew the identities of the sitters.

== Art market ==
Westra's print Untitled, from Washday at the Pa, 1963, set a new auction record price at NZ$10,575 at Webb's in Auckland, New Zealand, on 11 June 2015.

== Personal life and death ==
In 1965 Westra returned to the Netherlands to live until 1969. She had three children.

Westra was diagnosed with bipolar disorder, and later in life developed dementia.
