= The Renderers =

New Zealand musical group

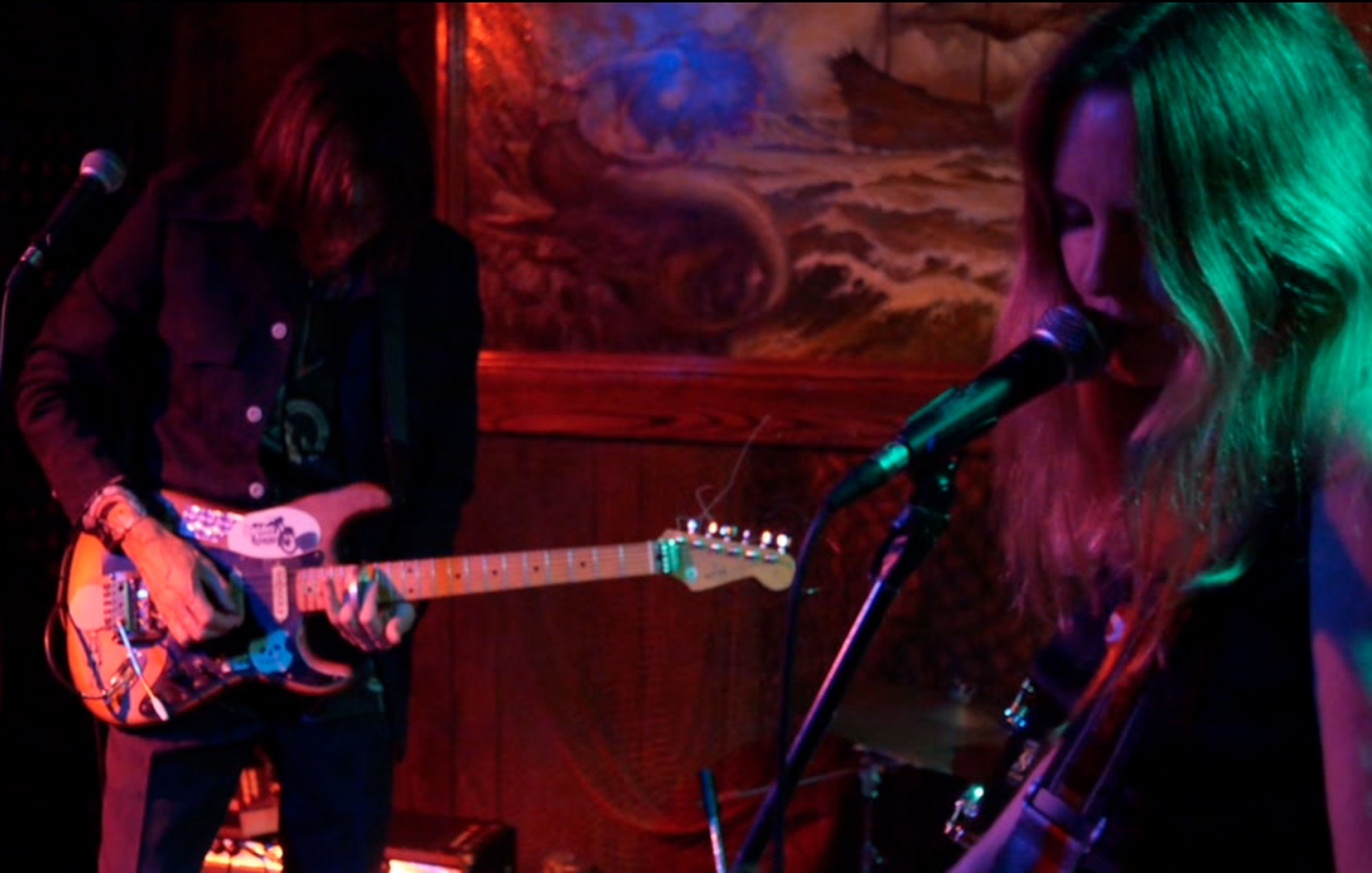

Background information
- Origin: Christchurch, New Zealand
- Genres: Experimental, psychedelic folk, country
- Years active: 1989–present
- Labels: Ba Da Bing Records, Drag City, Flying Nun Records, Last Visible Dog Records, Merge Records, Siltbreeze Records, Three Beads of Sweat Records, Tinsel Ears Records, Ajax Records
- Members: Brian Crook; Maryrose Crook

The Renderers are a New Zealand band from Christchurch formed in 1989 by Maryrose Crook and her husband Brian (of The Terminals).

== History ==
The Renderers released their debut album, Trail of Tears, in 1991 on Flying Nun Records. They produced seven further albums. Brian Crook also recorded a solo album in 1999 (Bathysphere). Their eighth album, In the Sodium Light, was released in January 2016.

== Discography ==
=== Albums ===
Title	Album details
Trail of Tears	Released: 1990; Label: Flying Nun Records
That Dog's Head in the Gutter Gives Off Vibrations	Released: 1994; Label: Ajax Records
The Surface of Jupiter	Released: 1996; Label: Ajax Records
A Dream of the Sea	Released: 1998; Label: Siltbreeze Records
Ghosts of Our Vegas Lives	Released: 2006; Label: Three Beads of Sweat Records
Monsters and Miasmas	Released: 2009; Label: Last Visible Dog Records
A Rocket into Nothing	Released: 2011; Label: Ba Da Bing Records
Measured Strychnine Invitations	Released: 2013; Label: Exiled Records
In the Sodium Light	Released: 2016; Label: Ba Da Bing Records

=== Singles ===
- "Bigger than Texas" (1990), Flying Nun
- "Touch of Evil" (1992), Flying Nun
- "Million Lights" (1993), Merge
