= Mark Adams (photographer) =

New Zealand photographer

- Born: 1949 (age 76–77); Christchurch
- Known for: Photography
- Notable work: Cook's Sites, Land of Memories
- Movement: Canterbury University School of Fine Arts, Christchurch
- Awards: Southland Art Foundation Artist in Residence, Marti Friedlander Photographic Award, Leverhulme Artist in Residence at the Museum of Archaeology and Anthropology, University of Cambridge

Mark Adams (born 1949) is a New Zealand photographer.

== Early life and education ==
He was born in Christchurch, New Zealand, and attended the Canterbury University School of Fine Arts from 1967–1970, majoring in graphic design to get access to photography.

I learned bugger all at art school. Tom Palaskas, a fellow student, taught me how to develop film and print. I taught myself how to use cameras. Then I discovered the art schools 4 x 5-inch Linhof plate camera and taught myself how to use that. That changed everything. That was the future.

== Life and work ==
After art school Adams became interested in painting through a long-term friendship with the artist Tony Fomison and later Theo Schoon.

Best known for his work on documenting Samoan tatau (tattooing), Maori-Pakeha interactions around Rotorua, and historic sites around New Zealand, Adam's work has been extensively exhibited within New Zealand as well as Europe, Australia and South Africa. His work has also featured in Brazil's São Paulo biennale.

In 1997 Adams was awarded the Southland Art Foundation Artist in Residence award.

His work is represented in most of New Zealand's major art institutions, including the Auckland Art Gallery Toi o Tamaki, Museum of New Zealand Te Papa Tongarewa and Christchurch Art Gallery.

In 2009, his photographs featured in a new book Tatau: Samoan Tattoo, New Zealand Art, Global Culture published by Te Papa Press, the publication arm of New Zealand's national museum. The book tells the story of Samoan master tattooist, the late Sua Sulu'ape Paulo II.

Adams lived for many years in Auckland, New Zealand where he has also taught photography.

== Publications ==
- Tatau: Samoan Tattoo, New Zealand Art, Global Culture (2009), ISBN 0-909010-11-0, ISBN 978-0-909010-11-9, published by Te Papa Press, Photographs by Mark Adams, edited by Sean Mallon and Nicholas Thomas.
- Rauru: Tene Waitere, Maori Carving, Colonial History (8 July 2009), ASIN 1877372617, ISBN 978-1-877372-61-2, published by Otago University Press, Photographs by Mark Adams, James Schuster, Lyonel Grant, edited by Nicholas Thomas.
- Cook's Sites: Revisiting History (1 Jan 1999), ISBN 978-1-877133-82-4, illustrated edition published by Otago University Press, Photographs by Mark Adams, edited by Nicholas Thomas.
- Land of memories : a contemporary view of places of historical significance in the South Island of New Zealand (1993), ISBN 978-0-908884-24-7, published by Tandem Press, Photographs by Mark Adams, text by Harry Evison.

== Exhibitions ==
- Tēnei Ao Tūroa – This Enduring World: Mark Adams, Natalie Robertson, Chris Corson-Scott, Adam Art Gallery Te Pātaka Toi, Wellington, 2022.
- Oceania, Royal Academy of Art, London, 2018; Quay Branly, Paris, 2019.
- Toi Art, Te Papa Tongarewa Museum of New Zealand, 2018.
- To All New Arrivals, Auckland Art Gallery Toi o Tāmaki, 2016.
- Archives - Te Wahi Pounamu: Areta Wilkinson and Mark Adams, Dunedin Public Art Gallery, 2016.
- Recent Auckland Photography, Northart, Auckland, 2013.
- Unnerved: The New Zealand Project, Queensland Art Gallery, 2010.
- Mark Adams, Bruce Connew, John Miller, Govett-Brewster Art Gallery, New Plymouth, 2009.
- Tatau, Museum of Anthropology, University of British Columbia, Vancouver; OCAD Gallery, University of Ontario, Toronto, 2008; Museum of Archaeology and Anthropology, University of Cambridge, 2010
- Pe'a: Photographs by Mark Adams, Auckland Art Gallery Toi o Tamaki, 2005.
- After William Hodges: Mark Adams Photographs, Auckland Art Gallery Toi o Tamaki, 2005.
- The 2nd Auckland Triennal: Public/Private – Tumatanui/Tumataiti, Auckland Art Gallery Toi o Tamaki, 2004.
- Mark Adams, Zelda Cheatle Gallery, London, 2004.
- Pe’a: Photographs by Mark Adams, Adam Art Gallery Te Pātaka Toi, Wellington, 2003.
- Cook's Sites: Revisiting History, Museum of New Zealand Te Papa Tongarewa, 1999; Southland Art Museum, Invercargill, 2000.
- Roteiros. Roteiros. Roteiros. Roteiros. Roteiros. Roteiros. Roteiros, Fundacao Bienal de São Paulo, Brazil, XXIV Bienal de São Paulo, 1998.
- Observations: Martin Van Vreden and Mark Adams, Gallery Die Praktjik, Lauriergracht, Amsterdam, 1997.
- Portrait of the Painter Tony Fomison, Auckland Art Gallery Toi o Tamaki, 1995.
- Whenua I Maharatia, Hae hae Ngā Tākata – Land of Memories, Scarred by People, Dunedin Public Art Gallery; City Gallery Wellington, 1993–94.
- After the Fact and Silence: Haruhiko Sameshima and Mark Adams, Lopdell House Gallery, Auckland, 1993.
- Pākehā-Māori: A Conjuncture, Rotorua City Art Gallery; Artspace, Auckland; George Fraser Gallery, Auckland; Real Pictures Photographic Gallery, Auckland; Govett Brewster Art Museum, New Plymouth; Dowse Art Museum, Lower Hutt; Manawatu Art Gallery, Palmerston North; Waikato Art Museum, Hamilton; MacDougall Art Gallery Annex, Christchurch, 1985–1990.
- O Le Ta Tatau, Samoan Tattooing, Real Pictures Photographic Gallery, Auckland, 1982.
- Mark Adams, Snaps – A Photographers’ Gallery, Auckland, 1976.
