= Bernard Holman =

English painter

Bernard Frederick Holman was an English artist who later emigrated to New Zealand to paint and teach. He was born in Woking in Surrey, England in 1941 and died in Dunedin, New Zealand on 11 September 1988.

Holman graduated from the Kingston upon Thames School of Art in 1961 with a Diploma of Painting with Honours. He then spent several years teaching art in secondary schools, before being made visiting lecturer to the art department at his old school and at various other centres in Norfolk. Holman first exhibited as a student at the Suffolk Gallery and at the Royal Academy Diploma Gallery. After exhibiting in London and Norfolk, he moved to New Zealand in 1974 where he was appointed to the Otago Polytechnic School of Art. Holman replaced William Reed as the School's Drawing and Painting tutor and was lecturer in these disciplines from 1974 and Head of Section from 1982 until his death. In 1978, he took part in a two-man exhibition at the Otago Art Society and he had a one-man exhibition at the Dunedin Public Art Gallery in 1981. Holman also took part in the New Zealand Drawing Exhibition in 1982-3 at the Dunedin Public Art Gallery.

The Dunedin artist John Z. Robinson was tutored in painting by Holman at the Otago Polytechnic School of Art.

Holman’s work is represented in private collections in England, the Netherlands, the United States of America and New Zealand. The Dunedin Public Art Gallery has three of his works – one acrylic painting on canvas and two drawings.

== Sources ==
- Tomlin, Jim (November 2016). "Dunedin School of Art: A History". Scope: Contemporary Research Topics (Art and Design) (12). Dunedin: Otago Polytechnic / Te Kura Matatini ki Otago.
- "Bernard Holman Obituary". Otago Daily Times. 15 September 1988.
