= Washday at the Pa =

Illustrated children's book by photographer Ans Westra

The original cover for the 1964 bulletin. Later republications feature the same image.

Washday at the Pa is a New Zealand illustrated children's book by photographer Ans Westra that describes a day in the lives of a rural Māori family. The term pā refers to a type of traditional settlement. The book was first published by the government Department of Education in 1964 and distributed to primary schools as a bulletin. (Note: A bulletin, also known as a "reader" or "journal", is a short book designed for school children. It is usually short, and is assigned to children based on their age, or level of reading ability.)

The bulletin was quickly recalled following criticism that its depictions of the poor, rural family were harmful to Māori, especially as the primary audience was young children. This decision led to public and academic discussion over censorship in the following decades.

Soon after being recalled from schools, the book was reprinted privately, this time for adults, on the artistic merits of Westra's photography. This new edition featured additional images not included in the short children's book, and some text was revised.

A third edition was released in 2011, with new images from Westra's meeting again with the family in 1998.

== Publication, withdrawal and republication ==
Westra visited with and photographed rural Māori throughout the country for five months, and, in 1964, Washday at the Pa was published as a school bulletin by the school publications section of the Department of Education. The bulletin was printed by the government printer, and 38,000 copies were distributed to primary school classrooms throughout New Zealand for use in standards two to five. Editors James K. Baxter and Alistair Campbell of the School Publications had expressed "doubts about the acceptability of the photographs to Māori" prior to publication, but the book was published anyway.

This photograph was published within Washday with the caption: "'No good going to bed with cold feet,' says Mutu." Standing somewhere that food is cooked would be considered tapu and a grave transgression in traditional Māori culture.

The bulletin tells a visual story of daily life for a Māori family at their rural home. The family was given the fictitious name "Wereta", and described as living "near Taihape" to protect their identities, though the home was actually in Ruatoria, near Gisborne. Scenes focus largely on the family's nine children, mostly playing or getting into mischief, as well as some scenes of domestic chores, and "Mr Wereta" shearing sheep. The rural home had no running water or electricity, and one photograph shows a young girl, Mutu, standing on a wood fire stove to warm her feet. This photo drew particular attention because according to Māori custom (tikanga Māori), feet should never come into contact with areas where food is prepared.

The living conditions of the family were seen as poor, and their rural home rundown. Concerns were raised by the Māori Women's Welfare League that the depiction of the Weretas would lead readers—impressionable children—to see the family and their living conditions as representative of all Māori. A campaign by the league had it that the book would have a "detrimental effect" on Māori people – and that the living conditions portrayed within the book were atypical. It was claimed that: "the Māori school child is immediately placed at a disadvantage with his European schoolfellows and becomes the butt of their derision". The league requested the bulletin's withdrawal from schools, and in August 1964, soon after its release, the journal was withdrawn by order of the Minister of Education. According to records, all 38,000 copies of the bulletin in schools as well as all unsold copies in the Government Bookshops chain were sent to Wellington, and destroyed, but copies have been seen selling for "hundreds of dollars" online.

Later in 1964 Washday at the Pa was republished privately by the Caxton Press in Christchurch, with this second edition including 20 additional photographs. The original text, also written by Westra, was revised, which led one critic to question whether the intended audience was adults or children, but noting: "from an artistic point of view one cannot fault Ans Westra's fine photography".

A new edition with photographs taken of the same family in 1998 was published by Ans Westra and Mark Amery in 2011.

== Publications ==
- Washday at the Pa by Ans Westra (Caxton Press, 1964), in particular the enclosed publisher's note.
- Washday at the Pa by Ans Westra (Government Printer, 1964).
- Washday at the Pa by Ans Westra and Mark Amery (Suite Publishing, 2011) ISBN 978-0-473-19846-6
