= Nic Moon =

New Zealand artist

Nic Moon (born 1968) is a New Zealand multidisciplinary artist based in Collingwood, New Zealand.

Moon grew up in a rural village near the Hunua Ranges, south-east of Auckland, and attended school in Auckland City.

== Education and career ==
Moon graduated from the University of Canterbury with a Bachelor of Fine Arts in 1990 and RMIT University, Melbourne with a Master of Fine Arts in 2002. Moon's decision to enrol in the BFA programme at age 17 was influenced by visiting a group exhibition protesting after the 1985 Sinking of the Rainbow Warrior. Moon was drawn to the idea that art could directly respond to life's challenges.

Over the course of her career, Moon has explored a variety of mediums including painting, sculpture and photography. Moon's work often responds to ecological and conservation concerns. Her early work was inspired by Ecofeminist artists such as Ana Mendieta, as well as the writings of Lucy R. Lippard.

== Notable exhibitions ==
Group

- Whole House Reuse, Canterbury Museum, Christchurch, 2015.

Solo

- Rānui Library redevelopment, in collaboration with Jasmax Architects, 2017.
- Me : And : With, PGgallery192, Christchurch, 2017.
- Tributary, PGgallery192, Christchurch, 2016.
- Tissue Memory, Whitespace, Auckland, 2014.
- The Silence, Whitespace, Auckland 2012.
- Incarnations, Catchment, Nelson, 2008.
- Transformations, Whitespace, Auckland 2008.
- If this Land could speak, Suter Art Gallery Te Aratoi o Whakatu, Nelson, 2007.

== Awards ==
- In 2009, Moon was the recipient of the William Hodges Fellowship.
- Auckland Regional Council residency, Wenderholm Regional Park, 2008. Moon produced a work titled A Royal Carpet using natural material collected in the park.
- Finalist in the 2008 Wallace Art Awards.
- Moon was awarded the 2007 Temporary Sculpture commission at Connells Bay, a contemporary sculpture park on Waiheke Island.
