= Regan Gentry =

Sculptor from New Zealand

- Born: 1976 (age 49–50)
- Education: Dunedin School of Art at Otago Polytechnic
- Known for: Sculpture
- Notable work: 'Subject to change' Karo Drive, Wellington

Regan Gentry (born 1976) is a New Zealand artist and sculptor. He has held a number of artist in residence positions and his work can be seen in public spaces throughout New Zealand. His artworks are often constructed from recycled or repurposed items such as gorse bushes and road safety barriers.

== Education ==
Gentry graduated with a Bachelor of Fine Arts from the Dunedin School of Art at Otago Polytechnic in 2000, although some sources state that his degree was from Otago University.

== Career highlights ==
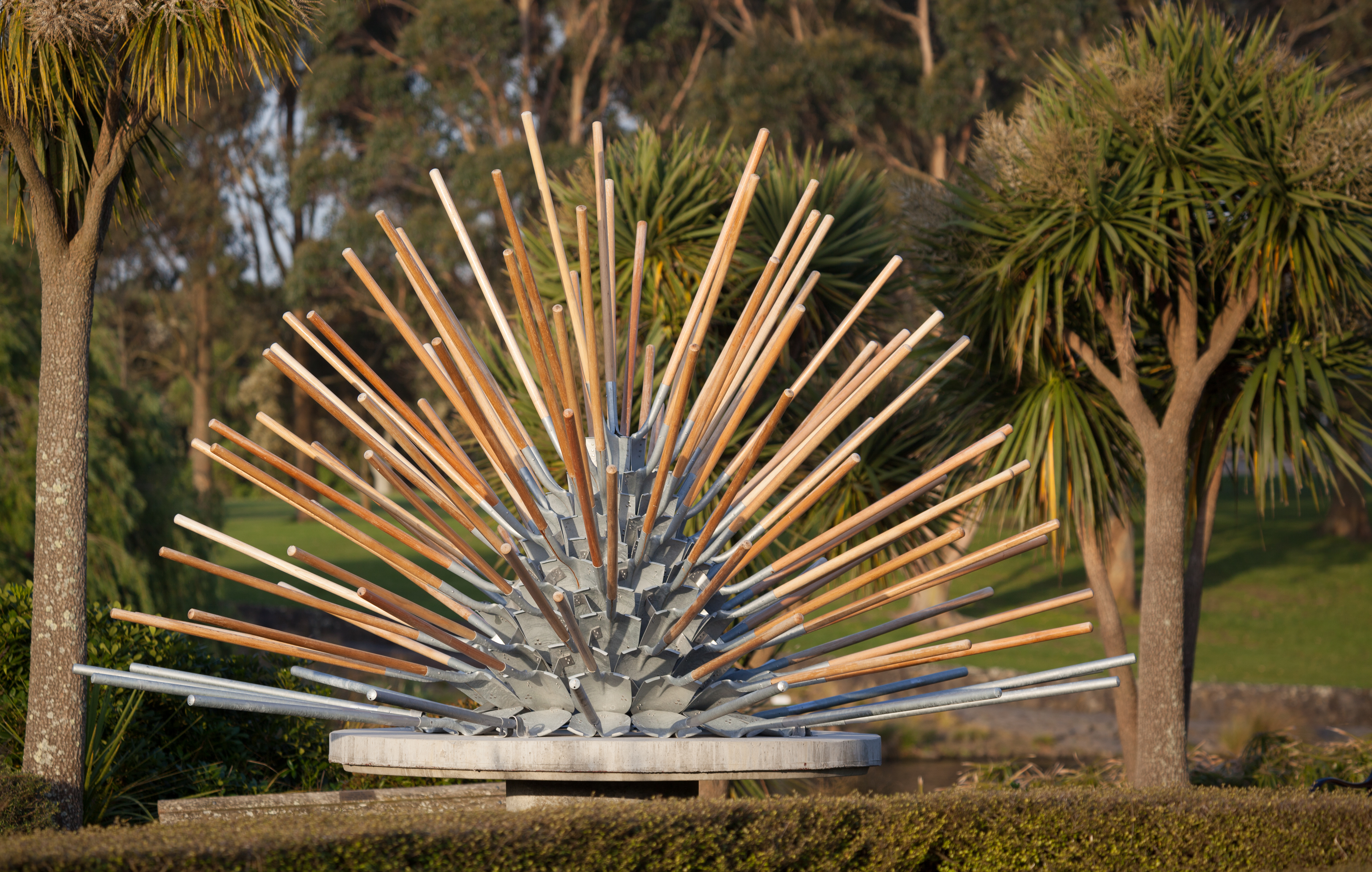
Splayed (2011), a galvanised steel sculpture at the Auckland Botanic Gardens

An early career piece was Foot in the Door, which has become an ongoing project to document the installation of a foot long ruler into the door of galleries across New Zealand. As the number of galleries that have allowed the artist to put ‘a foot in the door’ increases, so has the artist's reputation.

As the William Hodges Fellowship artist in residence in 2006 he produced a major body of work, Of gorse of course consisting of a series of artefacts constructed from wood obtained from gorse which has become a major invasive plant species in New Zealand. By crafting articles from gorse, the artist's intention was to draw a contrast with the poor reputation enjoyed by gorse. This work was subsequently exhibited at the Dowse Art Museum and Te Tuhi and is now owned by Connells Bay Sculpture Trust.

Gentry was the inaugural winner of Wellington Sculpture Trust's 4 Plinths Award. His installation Green Islands consisted of four trees constructed from No. 8 fencing wire. These stark leafless representations of the natural world provided an ironic commentary on the urban environment in which they were placed. In January 2010, the installation was relocated to the Wellington Botanic Garden.

His oversize beach lounger Recliner Rex won Gentry the Kids' Choice prize at the Australian Sculpture by the Sea exhibition in 2006.

From June 2007 to August 2008 Gentry was the artist residence at the Tylee Cottage during which time he produced near nowhere, near impossible, a reflection on the failed Mangapurua Valley Soldiers Settlement Scheme.

== Permanently exhibited works in New Zealand ==
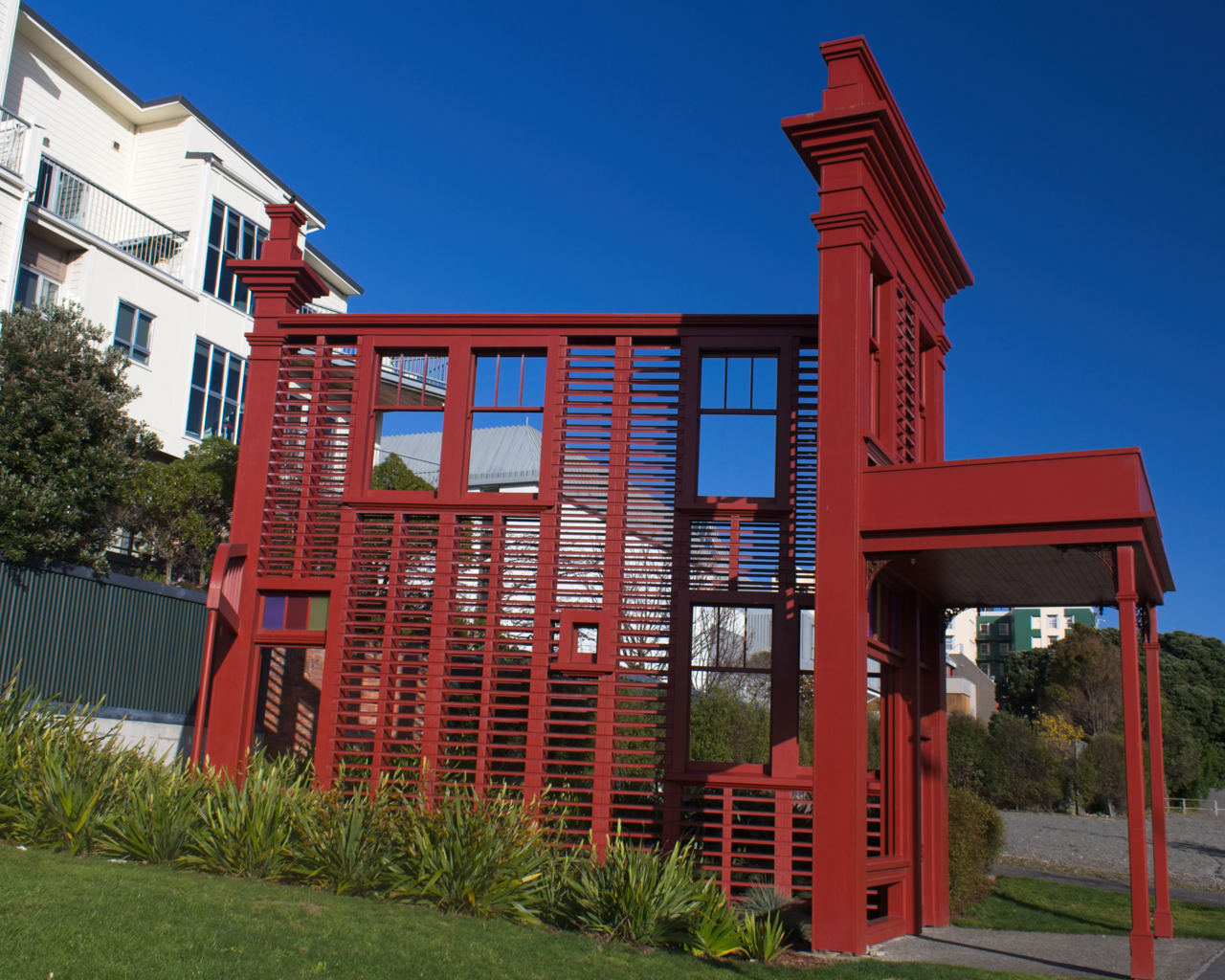
Subject to Change by Regan Gentry

Woods from the trees - Corner of High & Tuam Streets, Christchurch

Bound and around - Eastern Link Toll Road, Tauranga

Harbour Mouth Molars Kitchener Street park, Dunedin

Subject to change Karo Drive, Wellington

Flour power - Stewart Plaza, Christchurch

Green islands – Botanic Gardens, Wellington

Skeleton trees Connells Bay Sculpture Park, Waiheke Island

Learning Your Stripes Papatoetoe & District Returned Services Association (RSA) building, Papatoetoe

== Website ==
http://www.regangentry.com/
