= John Z. Robinson =

New Zealand painter (b.1953)

John Z. Robinson, photographed in 2008.

John Z. Robinson (born 25 May 1953 in Foxton, New Zealand) is a New Zealand painter, printmaker, and jeweller. He has lived in Dunedin, New Zealand since 1978.

== Education ==
Robinson completed a four-and-a-half-year manufacturing jewellery apprenticeship with Max Wilson in Palmerston North in 1973 and then worked with Roy Evans at Arcade Jewellers in Timaru. From 1978 to 1980, he attended Otago Polytechnic School of Art in Dunedin where he was tutored in painting by Tom Field, Bernard Holman and Walden Tucker and in sculpture by Fred Staub. He graduated with a Diploma in Fine Arts and returned to complete Honours in 1996.

== Career ==
Robinson has worked as a designer, jeweller, painter, print-maker and sculptor. He is a colourist whose paintings (acrylic) and prints (linocut) are primarily figurative though his prints often focus entirely on words, frequently with punning intent. His paintings tend to be impressionistic, whether they be landscapes and townscapes or portraits. Painting, for Robinson, "is a very subtle thing. You use a soft brush and apply paint and it's all about the gestural type of thing. With printmaking, you've got to push a chisel through the lino, whereas jewellery is all about metal and sawing and hammering, filing and shaping. One has no resistance; one has a little bit of resistance and one has a hell of a lot of resistance".

== Commissions ==
Amongst Robinson's many commissions have been set designs for theatrical productions of Entertaining Mr Sloane, School for Scandal, The Pearl Fishers and Twelfth Night, and book cover designs for Caclin (Lincoln University), Canzona, When Two Men Embrace: The New Zealand Anthology of Lesbian and Gay Poetry, SPORT 7, and The Journal of New Zealand Literature. A painting by Robinson appears on the cover of Dweller on the threshold by Noel Ginn.

== Exhibitions ==
Robinson's paintings and prints have been exhibited throughout New Zealand and works are included in the Hocken Collections, and the collections of Te Manawa, the Rotorua Museum and The Arts House Trust. He was awarded the William Hodges Fellowship and was artist-in-residence at the Southland Museum and Art Gallery in Invercargill in 1998. In 2006, the Port Gallery in Port Chalmers featured a retrospective of thirty years of Robinson's work in a show entitled John Z Robinson. A Survey of Paintings and Prints.

He has exhibited his paintings in Otaru in Japan and in New York City and his jewellery has been shown in Australia, Japan, New Zealand, and the United States, most notably at the Bead International in Athens, Ohio in 2000. From 18 August 2007 until 21 February 2010, Robinson's jewellery featured in an exhibition entitled The Scots in New Zealand at the Museum of New Zealand Te Papa Tongarewa in Wellington.

Robinson was one of twenty-six artists invited by the Department of Conservation to travel to Tamatea (Dusky Sound) in winter 2014 and summer 2015. Their task was to connect people with this special area by offering them a glimpse of an unseen world. In a response to his experience, Robinson produced a set of six sterling silver spoons tagged with Department of Conservation bird tags and two lino cuts. These were shown as part of a group exhibition entitled Tamatea. Art and Conservation in Dusky Sound at Bowen House in Wellington in November and December 2016 and at the Southland Museum and Art Gallery in Invercargill in December 2016 to February 2017.

In 2025, Robinson exhibited 21 portraits of LGBTQ+ people with a connection to Murihiku at He Waka Tuia Art + Museum in Invercargill. The portraits were created from brush, pencil, and cut and torn coloured paper and included personal references to each participant.

Robinson was artist in residence at Henderson House in Alexandra from June to September 2026. He paid homage to the philanthropist family through a series of work produced during his stay. Arriving in the midst of a Central Otago winter, Robinson was challenged by a dominant landscape and its muted range of colours, but found inspiration within the Henderson's garden and home.

== Books ==
Robinson's painting and print work featured in two books published in 2003 and 2004 respectively, being Other Men's Flowers. Portraits by John Z. Robinson, which concentrates on close up portraits of men, each paired with a painting of a flower, and Lake Warhola Soup - The Word-Prints of J. Z. Robinson, which focuses entirely on Robinson's punning monochromatic linocuts.

In December 2007, Longacre Press published Parallel Lines: Riding the Central Otago Rail Trail which included paintings of Central Otago by Robinson together with poetry by Annie Villiers.

Three books featuring Robinson's drawings and paintings were published in 2008 and 2009 – John Z. Robinson's 'The Dream of Endymion', Amy Bock – A Series of Drawings by John Z. Robinson and The Male Figure in the Art of John Z. Robinson.

A book entitled Red Studio: Forty-Five Prints was published by Longacre Press in October 2009 and celebrates Robinson's print-making career. The forty-five prints, mostly linocuts, were selected from a collection of simple but expressive prints. With an introduction by novelist Laurence Fearnley, the book is an intimate portrait of the artist's development. Of the book and the work in it, Robinson stated that he "wanted to show what he could do, so there are portraits, landscapes, abstracts and more conceptual works. There are also different techniques, like monoprints, and works using different inks".

A survey of Robinson's paintings was held at the TSB Bank Wallace Arts Centre in Auckland in 2013. This exhibition coincided with the publication of a further book entitled J. Z. Robinson. Paintings which contains a comprehensive overview of his painting career.

In 2015, Ravenwood Press published April by Annie Villiers and Robinson. The book contains a poetic narrative by Villiers and drawings by Robinson which reflect on the transition from late summer to early winter, in particular as it evolves in the south. Anzac Day and reflections on the place of Gallipoli in the April journey become part of the narrative through drawings and words.

== Art exhibitions ==
=== 1980–1990 ===
Solo exhibitions

- Et Sans Umbrella. Paintings by John Robinson. University of Otago Library, Dunedin, March 1981.
- Have Run Will Travel. Moray Gallery, Dunedin, 26 March 1984.
- The Rest of the Moon. Moray Gallery, Dunedin, 8–20 March 1986.
- Scene Red. Prints and Paintings by John Robinson. Moray Gallery, Dunedin, 21 April – 2 May 1986.
- John Robinson. Prints. Canterbury Society of Arts, Christchurch, 17–29 June 1986.
- John Robinson. Lino Prints. Manawatu Art Gallery, Palmerston North, 25 September – 23 November 1986.
- Lino Prints. Rotorua Art Gallery, Rotorua, December 1986-February 1987.
- Bridge and Chorus. Art Inn Gallery, Balclutha, 14 February 1987.
- Exhibition. Thompson House, Levin, 15–22 February 1987.
- John Robinson Exhibition. Moray Gallery, Dunedin, 16–27 February 1987.
- Scuba Scuba. Moray Gallery, Dunedin, 14–25 March 1988.
- Penny for Your Horse. Several Arts Upstairs Gallery, Christchurch, April 1988.
- John Robinson. New Zealand Consulate General, Rockefeller Centre, New York, United States of America, March–April 1988.
- John Robinson. Paintings 1979–1989. Moray Gallery, Dunedin, 27 February – 17 March 1989.
- 39 Views of Mt Zion. Lino-Cuts 1979-89. Moray Gallery, Dunedin, 1–15 October 1989.
- 39 Views of Mt Zion. Eastern Southland Gallery, Gore, 30 August – 10 September 1989.
- Paintings and Prints by John Robinson. University of Otago Staff Club, Dunedin, April–June 1990.
- John Robinson. Recent Paintings. 33 1/3 Gallery, Wellington, 16 June – 5 July 1990.

=== 1991–2000 ===
Solo exhibitions

- A Beard of Roses. 33 1/3 Gallery, Wellington, 18 May – 6 June 1991.
- John Robinson. Exhibition. 33 1/3 Gallery, Wellington, 13 December 1992 – 4 March 1993.
- Adelphi by Any Other Name. Paintings and Prints. 33 1/3 Gallery, Wellington, 13 February – 4 March 1993.
- John Robinson. Moray Gallery, Dunedin, 30 November – 11 December 1993.
- Blue Rata. Warwick Henderson Gallery, Auckland, 15 September – 2 October 1993.
- An Exhibition of Paintings and Prints by John Robinson. The Southland Museum and Art Gallery, Invercargill, 16 September 1994.
- Inside On. Milford Gallery, Dunedin, 14–26 November 1994.
- Other Summers: An Exhibition of Paintings and Prints. Art Works Gallery, Wanaka, 19 August 1995.
- New Paintings and Jewellery. Moray Gallery, Dunedin, 24 March – 12 April 1997.
- John Robinson. Paintings. Jewellery. Dobson Bashford Gallery, Christchurch, 16 July – 2 August 1997.
- Invercargill Paintings. Moray Gallery, Dunedin, 20 July 1998.
- John Robinson. New Paintings. Dobson Bashford Gallery, Christchurch, 14 April – 1 May 1999.

=== 2001–2010 ===
Solo exhibitions

- Clicketty Clack. Dobson Bashford Gallery, Christchurch, 28 February – 17 March 2001.
- Corner Bath and Stuart. Small Paintings and Prints. Moray Gallery, Dunedin, 16 October – 3 November 2001.
- Other Men's Flowers. Moray Gallery, Dunedin, 1–20 September 2003.
- Lake Warhola Soup. An Exhibition of Word Prints by Dunedin Artist John Z. Robinson. Jason Books, Auckland, 30 July – 13 August 2005.
- John Z. Robinson. A Survey of Paintings and Prints. Port Gallery, Port Chalmers, 7 April – 27 May 2006.
- John Z. Robinson – Paintings, Drawings and Prints. Red Gallery, Nelson, 5–22 September 2007.
- Amy Bock. A Series of Drawings by John Z. Robinson and The Male Figure in the Art of John Z. Robinson. Moray Gallery, 30 March – 2 April 2009.

=== 2011–2020 ===
Solo exhibitions

- Cooee. Dunedin Fringe Festival, Starewell Stairwell Gallery, Dunedin, 17–27 March 2011.
- John Z. Robinson: Paintings. TSB Bank Wallace Arts Centre, Auckland, 23 April – 2 June 2013.
- The Male Nude: New Drawings by John Z. Robinson. Moray Gallery, Dunedin, 6–31 October 2014. (Part of Arts Festival Dunedin, 2014).
- Dozen. Moray Gallery, Dunedin, 7–26 April 2018.
- A Several World. Moray Gallery, Dunedin, 30 November – 24 December 2019.

=== 2021– ===
Solo exhibitions

- John Z. Robinson. Picnic. Moray Gallery, Dunedin, 11–17 February 2021.
- Setting the Table. He Waka Tuia Art + Museum, Invercargill, 10 May – 22 June 2025.

== Jewellery exhibitions ==
=== 2000–2010 ===
Solo exhibitions

- The ABC of Birdland. A Wearable Alphabet by John Robinson. Lure, Dunedin, 19 August – 9 September 2000.
- A to Z of Birdland. An Avian Alphabet. Quoil Contemporary Jewellery Gallery, Wellington, 9–28 September 2002.
- John Z. Robinson – A to Z of Dunedin – A Wearable Alphabet. Lure, Dunedin, 1–27 September 2003.
- Table Jewels. An Exhibition of Domestic Silverware by John Z. Robinson. Quoil Contemporary Jewellery Gallery, Wellington, 3–22 October 2005.
- Chain. Handmade Chains by John Z Robinson. Quoil Contemporary Jewellery Gallery, Wellington, 7–21 November 2007.
- John Z. Robinson: 100s and 1000s. Lure, Dunedin, 1–18 October 2008. (Part of the Otago Festival of Arts, 2008).

== Articles and reviews ==
=== 1980–1990 ===
- No going back for printmaker. Otago Daily Times, Monday, 4 November 1985, p24.
- Reid, J., Impact in simple shapes. Otago Daily Times, Sunday, 16 March 1986.
- John Robinson. Prints. From 17–29 June 1986. CSA News, The Journal of the Canterbury Society of Arts, No. 128, 1986.
- John Robinson. Quarterly, Manawatu Art Gallery, September–November 1986.
- Earthy works. Feilding Herald, Tuesday, 23 September 1986.
- Tennent, B., Lino prints. The Daily Post, Wednesday, 14 January 1987, p18.
- Tennent, B., Exhibition portrays life of lino artist. Rotorua Daily Post, Wednesday, 4 February 1987, p16.
- Reid, J., Strengths highlighted. Works by John Robinson, John McDougall and Peter Cleverley at the Carnegie Gallery. Otago Daily Times, Monday, 21 September 1987.
- Lucky break for painter. Otago Daily Times, Thursday, 28 January 1988.
- Ruhe, Barnaby, New New Zealander Art. Art/World, Vol. 12, No. 6, 18 March – 18 April 1988.
- Reid, J., A fresh look at landscapes. Otago Daily Times, Monday, 28 March 1988, p26.
- French, B., Interesting theme provokes responses. Otago Daily Times, August 1988.
- Newsletter. Friends of Aigantighe Art Gallery, February–April 1989, p1.
- Reid, J., Variety heightens response. Otago Daily Times, Thursday, 9 March 1989.
- Guest exhibitors featured in Gore Gallery. The Southland Times, Wednesday, 30 August 1989.
- Reid, J., Restrained prints humorous. Otago Daily Times, Tuesday, 17 October 1989.
- Jerram, S., Exhibitions: Foxglove on, Foxglove off. Critic, Tuesday, 25 September 1990, p17.

=== 1991–2000 ===
- Cain, S., Positive response to life. Otago Daily Times, Thursday, 6 June 1991.
- Reid, J., Vivid optimism to angst-ugly. Romantic expression of varied 'quartet'. Otago Daily Times, Tuesday, 1 December 1992.
- McNamara, T. J., Paint and iron are united. Perspective on Art, New Zealand Herald, Thursday, 23 September 1993.
- Smith, C., Raising spirits with bright colours. Otago Daily Times, Tuesday, 30 November 1993.
- Tyler, L., New faces exhibit in artist self-portraits at gallery. Otago Daily Times, 26 October 1994.
- Smith, C., Portraiture not dead art, painter believes. Otago Daily Times, Tuesday, 15 November 1994, p17.
- Smith, C., NZ feel to Christmas exhibition. Otago Daily Times, 19 December 1995.
- Ballard, S., Portrait artists reveal more than images. Otago Daily Times, Tuesday, 16 January 1996.
- Smith, C., Exhibition to mark homosexual anniversary. Otago Daily Times, Friday, 14 June 1996.
- Harris, L., Carterton mayor opens show of homosexual artists' work. Otago Daily Times, 18 June 1996.
- Watson White, H., Gaiety at homosexual opening. Somewhere over the Stonewall – exhibition of lesbian and gay excellence, curated by John Robinson. Sunday Star-Times, Sunday, 23 June 1996.
- Spectrum choir exhibition. Southland Times, 9 July 1996.
- Chin, D., Two painters, two styles. Otago Daily Times, Tuesday, 20 August 1996.
- Watson White, H., Robinson painting with a child's vision. Sunday Star-Times, Sunday, 25 August 1996.
- Mutch, N., Tenderness a tonic. Otago Daily Times, Tuesday, 25 March 1997.
- Smith, C., Painter revisits early calling as jeweller. Otago Daily Times, Tuesday, 1 April 1997.
- Smith, C., Adventurous art. Otago Daily Times, 3 April 1997.
- Art lectures. Billboard. The Press, 16 July 1997.
- Crompton, A., Artists breathe life into chairs. Otago Daily Times, 11 October 1997.
- Mutch, N., Robinson, Stevens, L’Estrange show colours. Otago Daily Times, Tuesday, 17 March 1998, p15.
- Watson White, H., Dynamic design opens world. New paintings by Eion Stevens, Joe L’Estrange and John Robinson, Moray Gallery, Dunedin to 4 April. Sunday Star-Times, 29 March 1998.
- Lucas, C., Bold colours hold lasting appeal. Southland Times, Tuesday, 14 April 1998, p8.
- Winning Entry. Southland Times, 17 April 1998.
- Watson White, H., Finding gaiety and survival on the edge of the world. Sunday Star-Times, Sunday, 19 July 1998.
- Dingwall, R., The art of belonging to Caversham, nowhere or a private universe. Otago Daily Times, Tuesday, 9 March 1999, p18.
- Ussher, R., Finding the world, and a patchwork scene. The Press, Wednesday, 28 April 1999, p20.
- Dashing display. Mirror (Queenstown-Lakes Edition), 18 August 1999.
- Mutch, N., Telling artefacts from our recent history. Otago Daily Times, Tuesday, 7 March 2000.
- Mutch, N., Richardson's star shines. Otago Daily Times, 24 August 2000.

=== 2001–2010 ===
- Lonie, B., Dunedin. Battery Operated. Steve Carr. Claire Beynon. Sarah Rees. Art New Zealand, No. 99, (2001), p54-55.
- Watson White, H., A jeweller turned painter creates a wealth of life in a small space. Sunday Times, 2001.
- Mayston, B., Pictures worth a thousand words. Otago Daily Times, 2 June 2001.
- Field, P., Large works give full rein to style and spirituality. Otago Daily Times, Thursday, 18 October 2001.
- Edwards, A., Sacred images from the profane in Ukraine vision. Otago Daily Times, Thursday, 18 April 2002, p30.
- Review. A to Z of Birdland: An Avian Alphabet. An Exhibition of Jewellery by John Robinson. The Dominion Post, 13 September 2002.
- Art from the deep south. Havelock North Village Press, Thursday, 15 May 2003.
- McCauley, T., Going solo. Hawkes Bay Today, 4 June 2003, p32.
- McCauley, T., South Island selection. Hawkes Bay Today, Wednesday, 4 June 2003.
- Dignan, J., Flowers and masculinity prove a potent mix. Otago Daily Times, Thursday, 4 September 2003, p31.
- Dingwall, R., Glittering gazeteer gilds Dunedin alphabetically. John Z. Robinson, A to Z of Dunedin: a wearable alphabet. Otago Daily Times, Thursday, 25 September 2003, p38.
- Prebble, A., Pride Week Art Exhibition – Review. Otago Gaily Times, Issue Number 41, August–October 2004, p3.
- Harwood, B., John faces his year's work. Dunedin Star Weekender, Sunday, 20 November 2004.
- Dingwall, R., Robinson's word-prints satisfying and entertaining. Otago Daily Times, Thursday, 9 December 2004, p30.
- Broun, B., Multi-layered wordplay draws viewers into artist's fun print show. Auckland City Harbour News, Friday, 5 August 2005, p4.
- Dart, W. and Herrick, L., In the Warhola Soup. New Zealand Herald, Wednesday, 10 August 2005, B5.
- Broun, B., Art Exhibition: Lake Warhola Soup. Express, 10–23 August 2005, p23.
- Smith, C., Shining decade crafting the X factor. Impressions, Otago Daily Times, 27 October 2005, p29.
- Dingwall, R., Inviting array of jewellers' work. Artseen, Impressions, Otago Daily Times, 10 November 2005, p34.
- Dingwall, R., Shifting images of standstill throw viewer off balance. Otago Daily Times, Thursday, 8 December 2005, p38.
- Body, R., John Z. Robinson: 29 Nudes. Otago Gaily Times, Issue Number 47, February–April 2006, p9.
- Smith, C., Art – romance and reality. Otago Daily Times, Thursday, 30 March 2006, p30.
- Campbell, J., Many facets evident in war and peace. Impressions, Otago Daily Times, 13 April 2006, p38.
- Art beat. The Press. 20 May 2006, p3.
- Eggleton, D., Hot gossip and holy ground. John Z. Robinson might be the cure for repression. New Zealand Listener, 27 May 2006 – 2 June 2006, Vol. 204, No. 3446, p46.
- Dignan, J., Panels spread message. Artists celebrate the winter solstice. Otago Daily Times, Thursday, 22 June 2006, p34.
- Dingwall, R., Past artists hang together. Impressions, Otago Daily Times, 29 June 2006, p29.
- Jamieson, L., On the trail of a great image. Lakes District News, 19 October 2006, p2.
- Dignan, J., Memento mori. Impressions, Otago Daily Times, 7 December 2006, p2.
- Smith, H., Parallel Lines – Riding the Central Otago Rail Trail. Wairarapa Times-Age, Saturday, 9 February 2008.
- Jamieson, L., Book follows cycle of season on trail. Otago Daily Times, 6 March 2008.
- Harwood, B., Rainbow of art for Pride Week. Otago Daily Times, July 2008.
- Campbell, J., Art seen. John Z. Robinson, 100s and 1000s, Lure. Otago Daily Times, 2 October 2008, p30.
- Dignan, J., Art as far as the eye can see. Otago Daily Times, 9 October 2008.
- Halsey, W., 100s & 1000s. John Z. Robinson. Otago Gaily Times, Issue 58, November 2008-January 2009, p7.
- Herkt, D., Review: The Male Figure in the Art of John Z. Robinson at http://www.gaynz.com/articles/publish/23/printer_7336.php
- Wee, A., Beautiful books. Express, 20 May – 2 June 2009, p16.
- Beattie's Book Blog at https://beattiesbookblog.blogspot.com/2009/06/male-figure-in-art-of-john-z.html
- Body, R., Creative disclosures. Otago Gaily Times, Issue 61, August–October 2009, p3.
- Benson, N., Prints from a lofty realm. Otago Daily Times, 5 November 2009.
- Herkt, D., Review: 'Red Studio - 45 Prints' by John Z. Robinson at http://www.gaynz.com/articles/publish/23/article_7336.php
- Chinn, A., After the year of books: an interview with JZR. Otago Gaily Times, Issue 63, February–April 2010, p3.
- Watson White, H., Still sacred lives. New Zealand Books, Autumn 2010, p6.
- Dignan, J., notes from grey city. James Kerr and John Z. Robinson. Otago Daily Times, 14 October 2010.

=== 2011–2020 ===
- Dignan, J., Art seen. "Dozen", John Z. Robinson, (Moray Gallery). Otago Daily Times, 12 April 2018.

=== 2021– ===
- Voices, visibility, human rights showcased in exhibition featuring LGBTQ+ portraits. The Press, May 15, 2025 at https://www.thepress.co.nz/nz-news/360686181/voices-visibility-human-rights-showcased-exhibition-featuring-lgbtq-portraits
- Brown, N. and Hards, G., John Robinson and Otepoti's Queer History. Critic Te Arohi, Issue 13, 2025 at https://www.critic.co.nz/features/article/11715/john-robinson-and-332tepotis-queer-history
- Fox, R., Mentoring jewellers of the future. Otago Daily Times, 23 April 2026, p26.
- Wilson, A., Central Home: Dunedin artist finds inspiration in Henderson House. The Central App, 19 September 2026 at https://centralapp.nz/NewsStory/central-home-dunedin-artist-finds-inspiration-in-henderson-house/6aac661c6c8eb4002e74a605

== Bibliography ==
- Coutts, B. I., John Z. Robinson's 'The Dream of Endymion'. Auckland, New Zealand, 2008. ISBN 978-0-473-13661-1.
- Coutts, B. I., Graczer, P. B., and Templeton, M., The Male Figure in the Art of John Z. Robinson. Auckland, New Zealand, 2009. ISBN 978-0-473-14456-2.
- Coutts, B. I., notes from grey city. James Kerr and John Z. Robinson. Auckland, New Zealand, 2010. ISBN 978-0-473-17618-1.
- Douglas, D., ed. (June–July 2019). "Meet the designer...introducing JWNZ member and contemporary Dunedin jeweller John Z Robinson". Jewellery Time. Auckland, New Zealand: Inklink Publications Limited.
- Fearnley, L., 100s and 1000s. John Z. Robinson. Lure Jewellery, Dunedin, New Zealand, August 2008.
- Ginn, N., (Millar, P., Editor), Dweller on the threshold. Steele Roberts, Wellington, New Zealand, 1998.
- Graczer, P. B., Other Men's Flowers. Portraits by John Z. Robinson. Auckland, New Zealand, 2003. ISBN 0-473-09718-4. (Reprinted as of Aztecs, Azaleas and Acquaintances in Lino, Issue No. 6, 2004, pp. 94–99).
- Graczer, P. B., Lake Warhola Soup. The Word-Prints of J. Z. Robinson. Auckland, New Zealand, 2004. ISBN 0-476-01072-1.
- Graczer, P. B., Amy Bock. A Series of Drawings by John Z. Robinson. Auckland, New Zealand, 2009. ISBN 978-0-473-14509-5.
- Hardie, C., John Z. Robinson: A Survey of Paintings and Prints. Port Gallery, Port Chalmers, 7 April – 27 May 2006. Port Gallery, Port Chalmers, 2006.
- Jensen, K. and Robinson, J. Z., The great Dunedin volcano. K. Jensen, Dunedin, New Zealand, 1987. ISBN 0-473-00442-9.
- McCluskey, M., A Noble Piece: Contemporary Jewellery Constructed from Noble Metals and Issues. Catalogue of an Exhibition of Jewellery at Lure Works, Dunedin, New Zealand, 3–15 December 2001. Lure Works Limited, Dunedin, New Zealand, 2001.
- McGahey, K. (2000). The Concise Dictionary of New Zealand Artists, Painters, Printmakers, Sculptors. Wellington, New Zealand: Gilt Edge Publishing. ISBN 0-473-05802-2.
- Robinson, J. Z., Red Studio: Forty-Five Prints. Longacre Press, Dunedin, New Zealand, 2009. ISBN 978-1-877460-38-8.
- J Z Robinson. Paintings. Auckland, New Zealand, 2013. ISBN 978-0-473-24095-0.
- Tamatea. Art and Conservation in Dusky Sound, Wellington: Department of Conservation, October 2016
- The Chief Post Office 1937. A Commemorative Art – Heritage Brochure Celebrating a Part of Dunedin's History. Featuring Artists Manu Berry, Claire Beynon, Peter Booth, Erin Dellow, Alan Dove, Frank Gordon, Rochelle Liggins, John Z. Robinson, Jo St Baker, Lynn Taylor and Julie Whitefield. A Salisbury House Gallery Production, Dunedin, 4 October 2008.
- The Otago Arts Trust, Otago Arts Guide, Art Roads of Otago. Dunedin, New Zealand, 2002. ISBN 0-473-08054-0.
- Villiers, A. and Robinson, J. Z., Parallel Lines: Riding the Central Otago Rail Trail. Longacre Press, Dunedin, New Zealand, 2007. ISBN 978-1-877361-92-0.
- Villiers, A. and Robinson, J. Z., April. Ravenwood Press, Dunedin, New Zealand, 2015. ISBN 978-0-473-30056-2.
