= Maryrose Crook =

New Zealand musician and artist

Maryrose Crook (née Wilkinson) is a musician and artist from New Zealand.

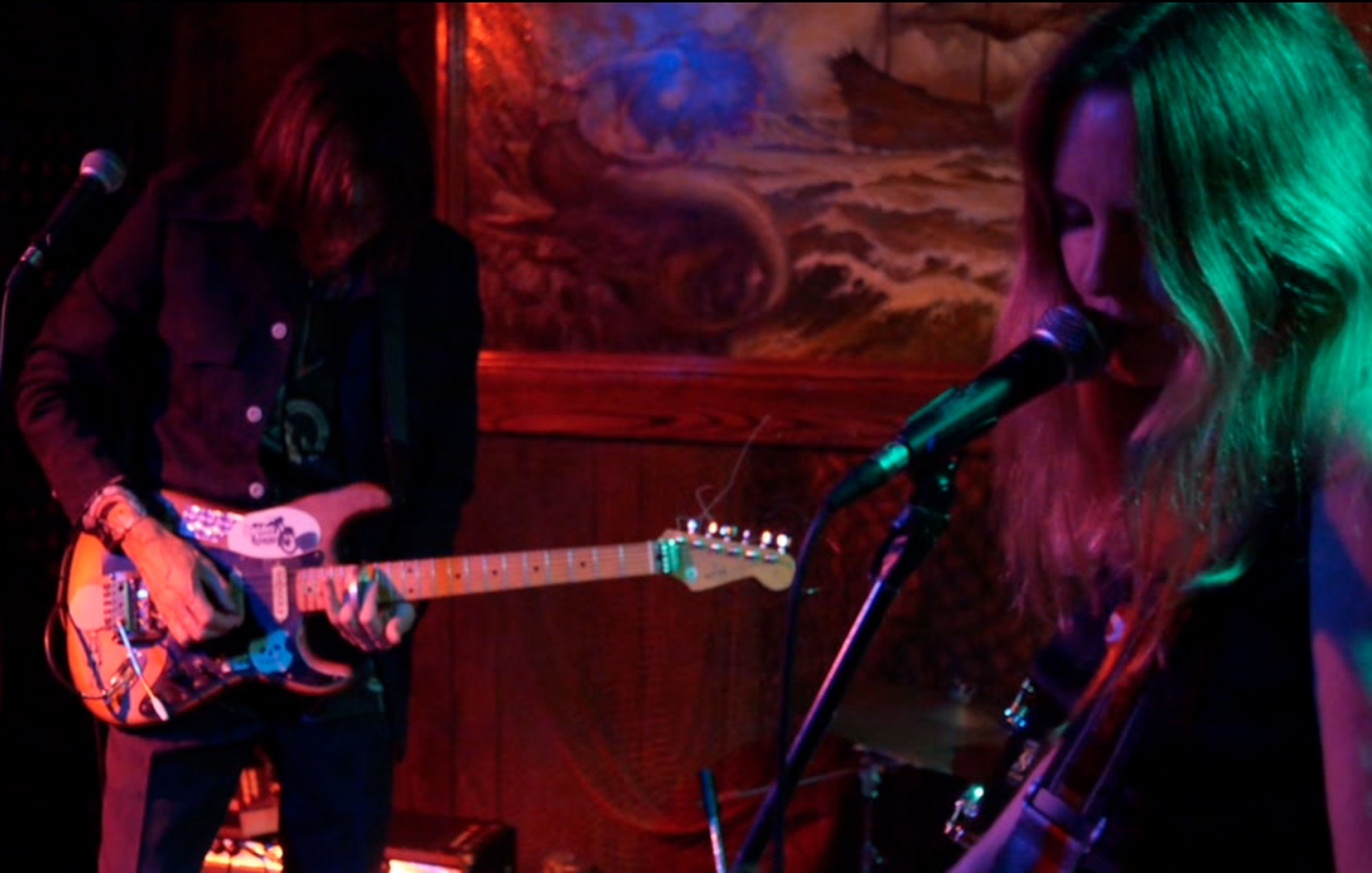
The Renderers performing in Los Angeles in 2014

Crook and her husband, Brian, formed the band The Renderers in Christchurch, New Zealand, in 1989. The band has released music with New Zealand company Flying Nun Records and American labels Merge, Siltbreeze and Drag City, and have toured New Zealand twice as the backing band for American alt-folk star Bonnie Prince Billy.

In 1993 Crook moved to Port Chalmers and exhibited her first paintings in a cafe in Dunedin in 1995; within a year she was invited to exhibit at the Dunedin Public Art Gallery. She is known for creating large-scale canvases depicting surreal, other-worldly landscapes. Her work is held in public and private collections in New Zealand, Australia, Germany and the United States.

The 2011 Christchurch earthquake destroyed Crook's home in Diamond Harbour and she and her family moved to the United States the following year. Based in Joshua Tree, California, Crook and her husband tour as The Renderers and Crook creates and exhibits paintings.

== Recognition ==
Crook won the 2003 William Hodges Fellowship, Merit Awards in the 2005 Waikato Art Award and the 2006 Wallace Development Award.
