= Sua Sulu'ape Paulo II =

Samoan chief and tattoo artist

Su'a Sulu'ape Paulo II

Su'a Sulu'ape Paulo II (1949 or 1950 – 25 November 1999) was a tufuga ta tatau (master tattooist) born in Matafa'a near Lefaga, Samoa but based in New Zealand since the 1970s. He was born into one of the leading families of tattooists tufuga ta tatau in Samoa. The tattooists in these families, are loosely organized in a guild like system of master and apprentices. In the late 20th and early 21st centuries tufuga ta tatau were known internationally for their culturally distinctive and highly skilled work. The word tattoo is believed to have originated from the word tatau. In Samoan mythology the origin of the tatau is told in a legend about two sisters, Tilafaiga and Taema who brought the tools and knowledge of tattooing to Samoa. The Samoan male tattoo (tatau) is the pe'a. The female tatau is the malu.

Paulo was axed to death by his wife, Epifania Sulu'ape, after she learned that he planned to leave her for his Swedish lover, Heidi Hay.

== Early career ==
Sulu'ape Paulo's father was Sulu'ape Paulo I, who was a well established tattooist in Samoa. Paulo's brothers Su'a Sulu'ape Petelo, Su'a Sulu'ape Alaiva'a Petelo and Su'a Sulu'ape Lafaele are respected master tattooists today. In his teenage years, Paulo was a student at Chanel College, a Catholic [boarding] school near Apia. He began tattooing in 1967, and migrated to Auckland, New Zealand in 1973. Paulo would work during the day and tattoo in the evenings and on weekends for a growing local Samoan community. He tattooed several prominent Samoans from this community including artist Fatu Feu'u and activist and lawyer Fuimaono Tuiasau. He also tattooed well known New Zealand artist Tony Fomison and developed strong connections with Maori, the indigenous people of New Zealand.

== International connections ==
In 1985, Paulo's brother Su'a Sulu'ape Alaiva'a Petelo visited a tattoo convention in Rome at the invitation of American tattooist Don Ed Hardy. Over the next decade, Sulu'ape Paulo followed in his brothers footsteps finding new opportunities to share his work and knowledge in Europe. He developed relationships with tattooists across the world and the family name became known throughout the tattooing conventions in Europe. He did residencies at the Tattoo Museum in Amsterdam at the invitation of tattooist Henk Schiffmacher and received international guests and customers at his home in Auckland. Sulu'ape and his brothers also served a growing Samoan diaspora in New Zealand, Australia and the United States. He was a much celebrated and at times a controversial figure amongst Samoans, mainly for his efforts to innovate in his work and share the art form beyond the Samoan community. Since Paulo's sudden death in 1999, Su'a Sulu'ape Alaiva'a Petelo has maintained and extended the influence of the Sulu'ape family in the Pacific region and internationally. He has been joined by his sons who have also picked up the tools.

== Photographic record ==
In 2009, Su'a Sulu'ape Paulo's life and tattoo work was documented and published in a photographic book Tatau: Samoan Tattoo, New Zealand Art, Global Culture published by Te Papa Press. The book features photographs by New Zealander Mark Adams a close friend of Sulu'ape and observer of his work for close to 30 years. it includes interviews and essays reflecting on his tattooing career.

== Death ==
In November, 1999, Paulo's wife Epifania Sulu'ape clubbed him to death with the blunt edge of an axe after he told her that he planned to leave her for a Swedish lover, Heidi Hay. Sulu'ape's trial was a major media event in New Zealand. She was convicted of manslaughter and sentenced to 7.5 years in prison.

== Other sources ==
Samoan Tattooing - Museum of New Zealand Te Papa Tongarewa http://collections.tepapa.govt.nz/topic/1560
