= Malu =

Type of tattoo

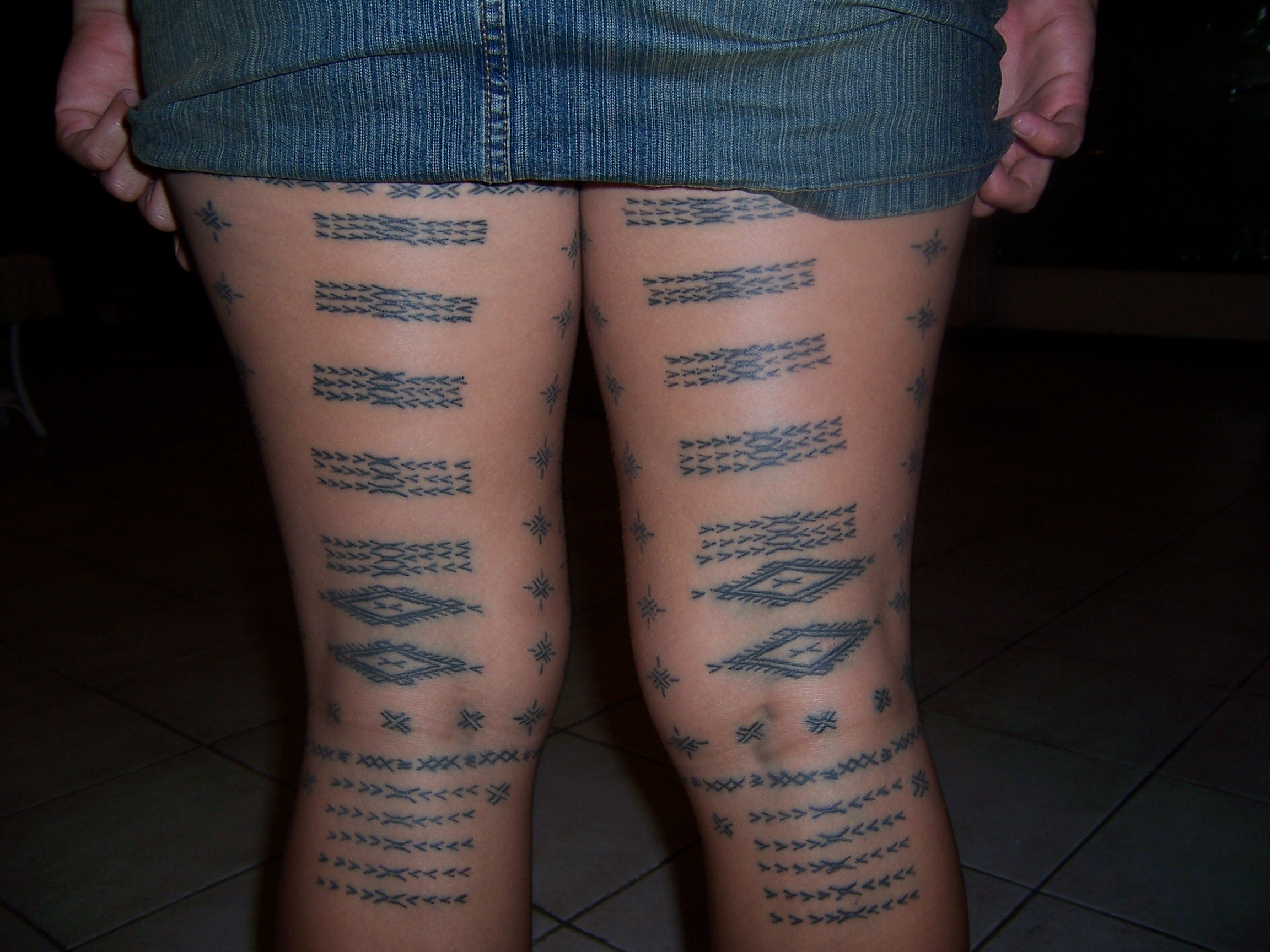
A Samoan woman with malu

Malu is a traditional Samoan tattoo applied to women. The malu covers the legs from just below the knee to the upper thighs just below the buttocks, and is typically finer and more delicate in design compared to the peʻa, the tattoo worn by men. The malu takes its name from a particular lozenge-shaped motif of the same name, usually tattooed behind the knee, in the popliteal fossa. It is one of the key motifs not seen on men. According to Samoan scholar Albert Wendt and tattooist Sua Sulu'ape Paulo II, in tattooing, the term malu refers to notions of sheltering and protection. Samoan women were also tattooed on the hands and sometimes the lower abdomen. These practices have undergone a resurgence since the late 1990s.

== Changing significance ==
In the late 19th and early 20th centuries, only the district paramount chief's daughter was eligible to wear the malu, which was applied to these young women in the years following puberty. Women with the malu were expected to perform key ceremony tasks and represent their families and villages on ceremonial occasions. However, in 1930, anthropologist Peter Buck observed that "...the tattooing of a girl is often used as an opportunity for a student to try his prentice hand. This is also rendered possible by the fact that there is no fusita (fine mat) passed or any of the ceremony that marks the tattooing of the male. It is often sufficient reward for the novice to have the opportunity of practice and to be well fed during the period occupied by the operation...For the daughter of a high chief, who is to become the village taupou, it can be readily understood that an expert artist would be requisitioned and his reward greater."

Ceremonial roles are still important in Samoan society and are restricted in similar ways to particular people with the correct qualifications and cultural knowledge, but the significance of the malu has shifted. From at least the 1990s, there has been less emphasis on chiefly qualifications, and women of a variety of backgrounds and ages have been tattooed with the malu. However, the malu is not important to all Samoans, or the only symbol of an individual's commitment or participation in Samoan cultural life. In the Samoan congregations of some churches, men and women have been discouraged from getting tattooed. In New Zealand and Australia, the malu is increasingly important as a symbol of Samoan cultural identity rather than only a signifier of a person's ability to carry out specific Samoan ceremonial roles. The contemporary meanings and significance of malu are often vigorously contested; in recent years this has become especially noticeable in social media forums when tattooists and tattooed people share photographs of their tattoos. It is clear from these public debates that the changes in meaning for all forms of Samoan tattooing are being made by the people who wear the images as much as by the tattooists who create them.

== Non-Samoans and the malu ==
There are also accounts of non-Samoan women receiving the malu. One relates to an American named Elsie Bach who worked as a Peace Corps volunteer in Samoa in the 1970s. She developed strong relationships with families in the Samoan community, and received a malu and a matai (chiefly) title in acknowledgement. As Samoan tattooists have travelled and worked in the United States and Europe, women from other ethnic backgrounds and nationalities have been tattooed with the malu or elements of it. This practice is controversial and is sometimes criticised as cultural appropriation by Samoans.
