= Miranda Parkes =

New Zealand artist and musician (born 1977)

- Born: 1977; Christchurch, New Zealand
- Education: University of Canterbury School of Fine Arts (MFA, 2005)
- Known for: Painting, multimedia art
- Notable work: Scrunched canvases, Whopper (2014), Shebang (2013)
- Awards: Frances Hodgkins Fellowship (2016); Olivia Spencer Bower Award (2013); William Hodges Fellowship (2007); Tylee Cottage Residency (2009)

Miranda Parkes (born 1977) is a New Zealand painter and multi media artist based in Christchurch, New Zealand. Parkes' works are held in the collections of the Sarjeant Gallery and the Arts House Trust.

== Education and career ==
Parkes graduated with a Master of Fine Arts (distinction) in painting from the University of Canterbury School of Fine Arts in 2005.

Parkes is known for her scrunched canvases, and works across a range of media, often playing with depth and layering.

== Notable exhibitions ==
Group

- Paint, Bartley & Company, Wellington, 2022.
- Hine Auaha, The Central Art Gallery, Christchurch, 2021.
- the new nice, joint show with ceramicist Madeleine Child, Olga Art Gallery, Dunedin, 2019.

Solo

- Baller, Jonathan Smart Gallery, Christchurch, 2023.
- Open Relationship, commissioned for Pahū! at Te Ara Ātea, Selwyn, 2022.
- Zoomer, Bartley & Company, Wellington, 2021.
- the merriest, Jonathan Smart Gallery, Christchurch, 2018.
- the merrier, Hocken Collections, Dunedin, 2017.
- Whopper, commissioned for Tauranga Art Gallery, 2014.
- Shebang, Sarjeant Gallery, Whanganui, 2013.
- Cracker, Jonathan Smart Gallery, Christchurch, 2010.

== Awards and residencies ==
- Frances Hodgkins Fellowship recipient in 2016.
- Olivia Spencer Bower Award recipient in 2013.
- William Hodges Fellowship recipient in 2007.
- Tylee Cottage Residency recipient in 2009.
