= Southern Institute of Technology =

Educational institution in Invercargill, New Zealand

Coordinates: 46.41350°S 168.35531°E

- Te Whare Wānanga o Murihiku (Māori)
- Established: 1971; 55 years ago
- Affiliations: Public NZ TEI
- Faculty: 387 FTE 2005
- Students: 13,758 (2017)
- Location: 133 Tay Street, Invercargill, New Zealand, Invercargill, New Zealand
- Website: www.sit.ac.nz

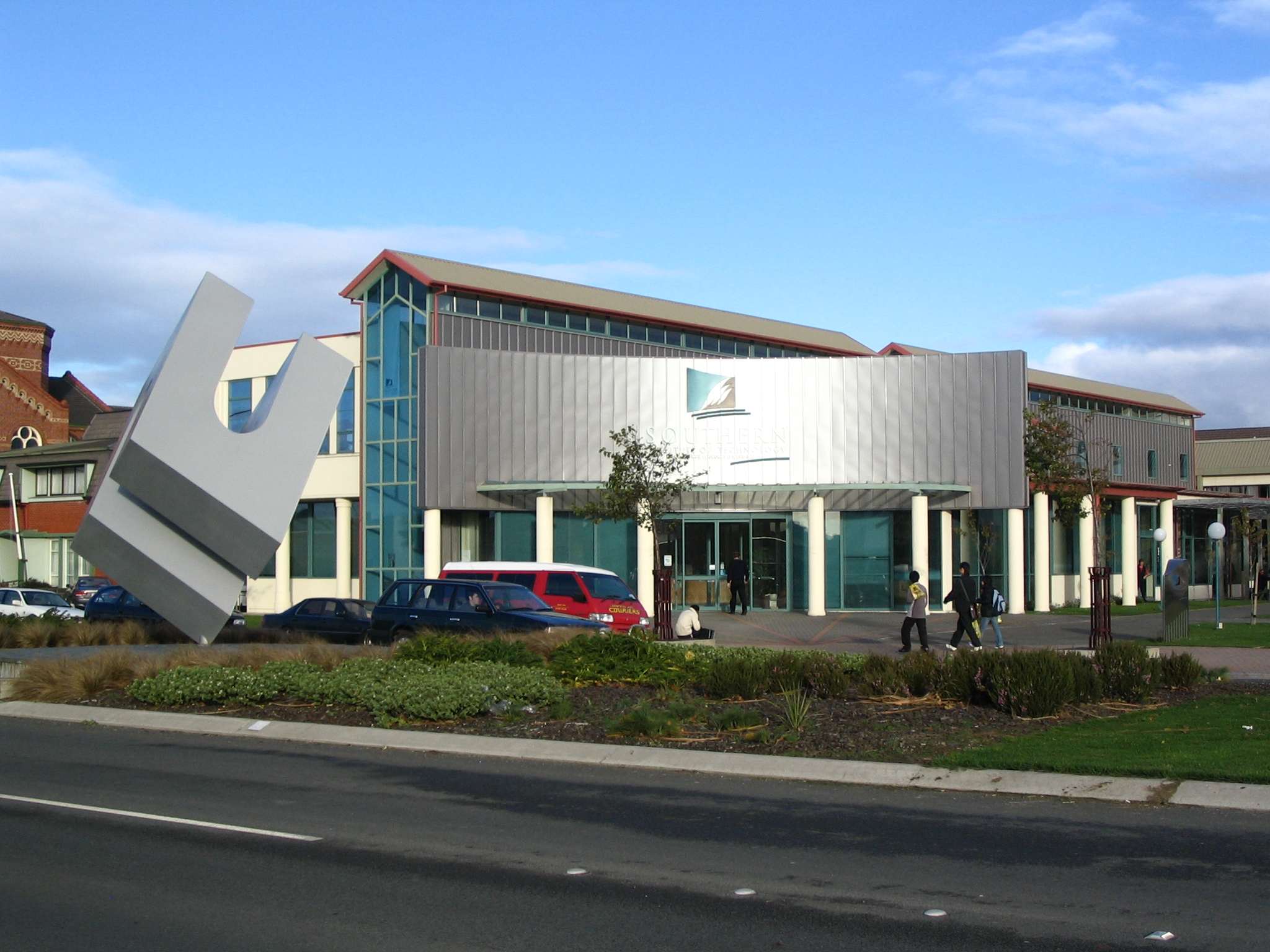
SIT, taken from Tay St

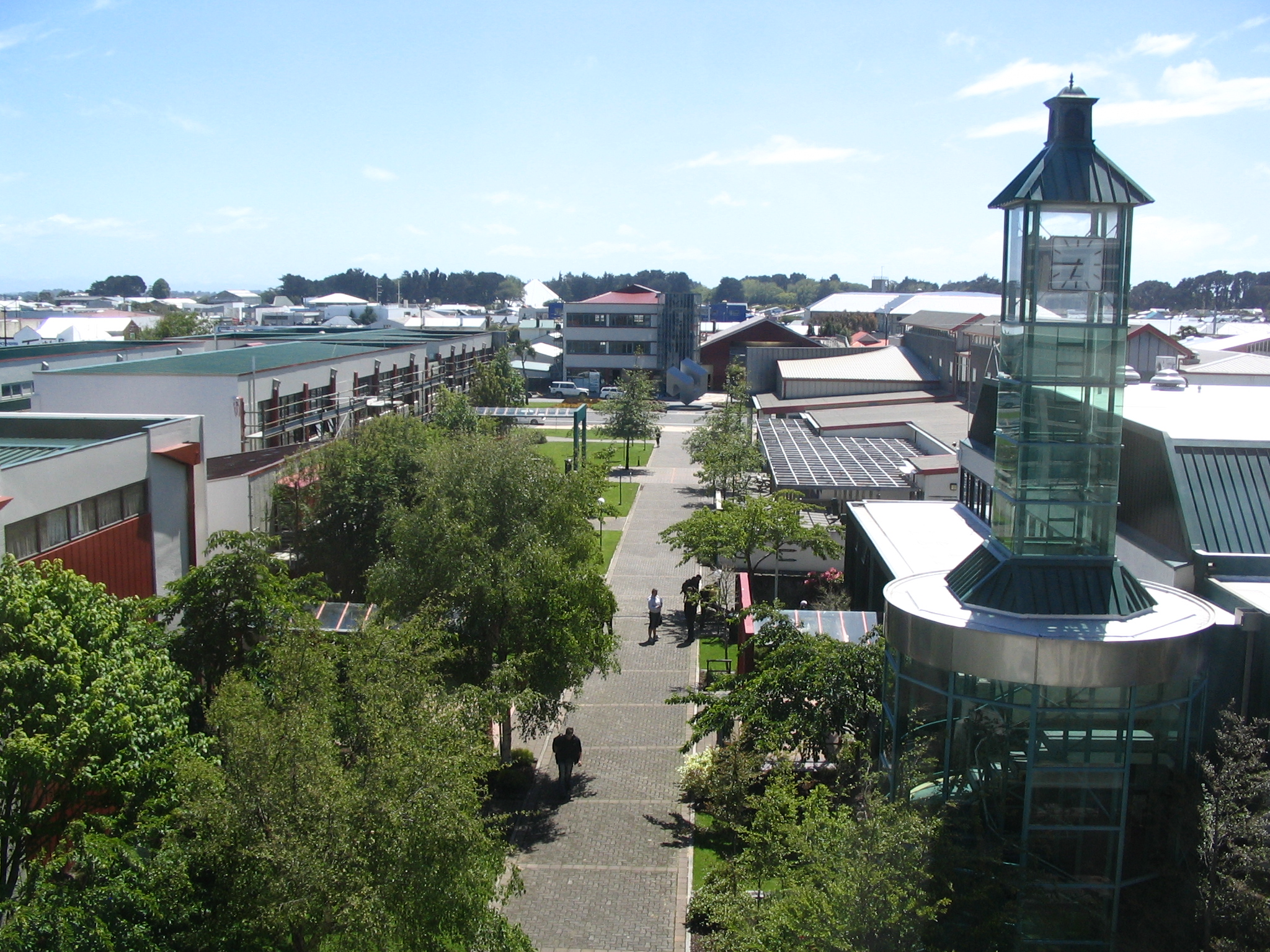
SIT main walkway

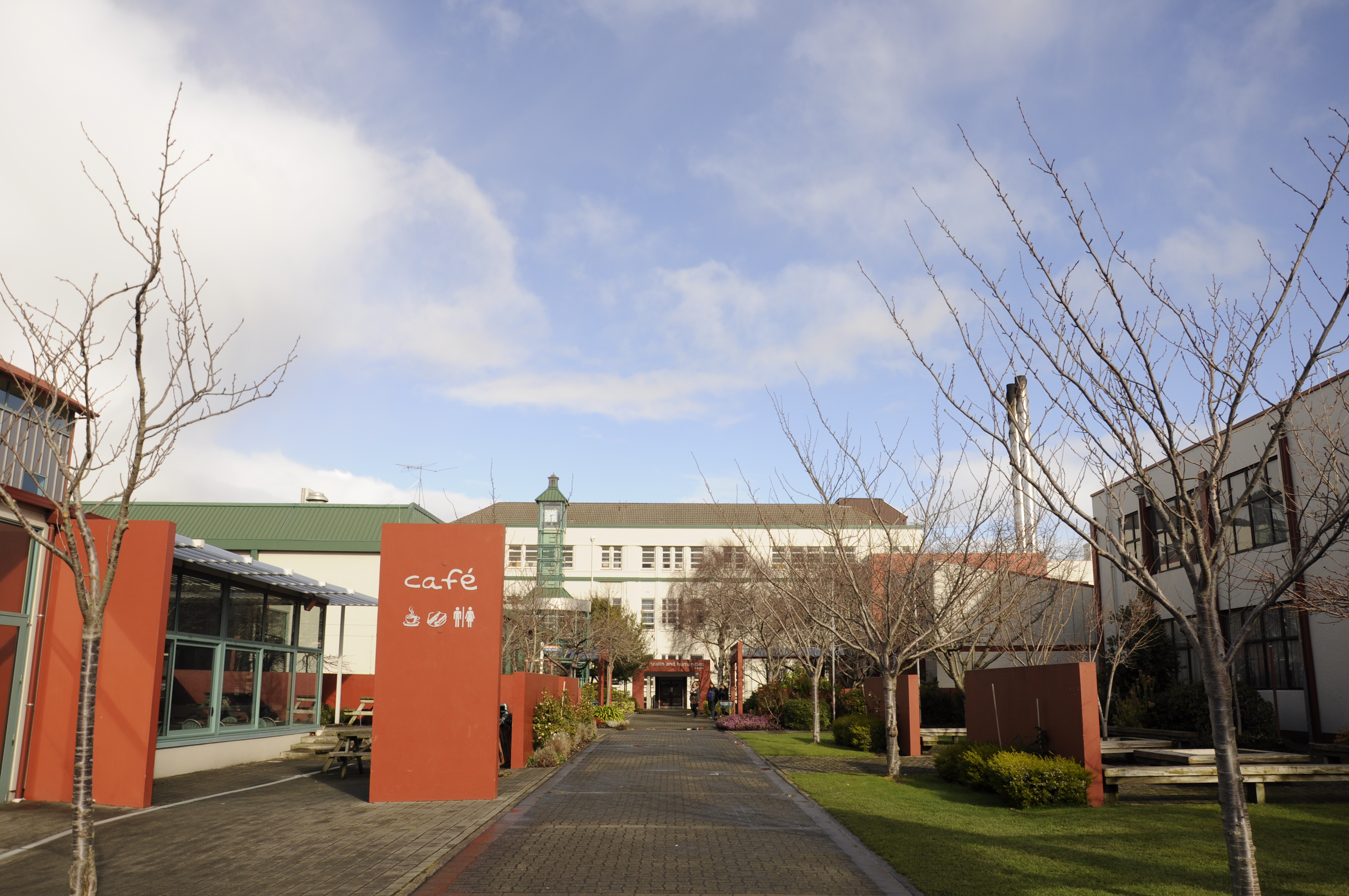
Grounds at SIT Main Campus (Tay St, Invercargill)

The Southern Institute of Technology (SIT; Māori: Te Whare Wānanga o Murihiku) is a public tertiary education institution (NZ TEI), established in 1971. It is one of New Zealand's largest institutions of technology, with 12,579 enrolees in 2021, contributing to a total of 4,768 Equivalent Full-Time students (EFTs), 3,989 domestic, 933 International.

SIT is famous for its Zero Fees Scheme. The Scheme was initiated by the Invercargill City Council as means to attract students to Invercargill due to dwindling student numbers. The scheme, which is open to New Zealand citizens and permanent residents, sees students save thousands of dollars on the cost of their tertiary education. The institution is also renowned for the quality of its facilities and equipment.

SIT offers over 200 programs in a range of academic, technical, and professional subjects at postgraduate, graduate, bachelor, diploma, and certificate levels. SIT is a member of the International Association of Universities.

== History ==
On 1 April 2020, the Southern Institution of Technology was subsumed into Te Pūkenga (the New Zealand Institution of Skills & Technology) alongside the 15 other Institutions of Technology and Polytechnics (ITPs).

In July 2025, the Vocational Education Minister Penny Simmonds announced that the Government would return SIT and nine other polytechnics to regional governance by 1 January 2026.

On 1 January 2026, SIT formally left Te Pukenga to become an independent entity again. In mid-February 2026, the Government allocated over NZ$27 million to Otago Polytechnic to support its transition.

== Campuses ==
SIT has several campuses around Invercargill (SIT Tay Street, Creative Centre, and SIT Sound) with other campuses located in Queenstown, Gore, Telford, Christchurch and Auckland, and has a distance education faculty, SIT2LRN. In 2018 SIT acquired MAINZ, the Music and Audio Institute of New Zealand, and operates MAINZ campuses (closed down Auckland campus in 2023) in Christchurch.

A new campus, the SIT Creative Centre will open in 2020, on the site of the historic St Johns Church.

SIT has three campuses in Invercargill. The main campus is situated on either side of Tay Street. SIT Downtown is situated in the centre of Invercargill's business district and is home to new media and arts programs. SIT Sound in the Invercargill Radio Network Building hosts audio production programs.

SIT has undertaken a major campus redevelopment plan over the past fifteen years. This includes the completion of new classrooms, the development of the SIT Library complex which includes the Literacy and Numeracy Resource Center and Teaching and Development Support Unit, and the redevelopment of the Student Services area.

In 2012, SIT completed a NZ$5.5 million redevelopment of the trades and technology teaching and learning areas which included a new Industry Training Center. 2012 also saw the redevelopment of the School of Nursing, which included the addition of a new multi-million dollar Nursing Simulation Center and the refurbishment of related facilities.

The Gore campus provides a base for the catchment areas of Eastern Southland, Northern Southland and West Otago.

The Queenstown campus operates from a new facility in the Remarkables Park retail and commercial development area in Frankton. The campus offers business, administration, computing, hospitality, tourism, sports, beauty therapy, and hairdressing programs.

SIT's Christchurch campus is based in Hornby. The campus offers specialised training in a number of areas including carpentry, electrical, refrigeration and air conditioning, roofing, automotive, sports, and mental health support.

The Telford (Balclutha) campus extends over 921 hectares of farmland with halls of residence and facilities, technical workshops (machinery, carpentry, and welding), classrooms, and livestock units.

The Music and Audio Institute of New Zealand is a faculty of the Southern Institute of Technology (SIT) with a campus in Christchurch. MAINZ offers a range of programs designed with the music industry in mind including Music Performance, Audio Engineering/Production, DJ, and Event Management

In 2003, two years after the launch of the Zero Fees Scheme, SIT launched its flexible mixed-mode delivery (or distance education) faculty, SIT2LRN. SIT2LRN was made possible through a partnership with Southland TV (later known as Cue TV) where SIT could use television and internet technology to provide distance learning. Initially, SIT offered just one academic qualification – a Diploma in Tourism and Hotel Management – and attracted an online student body of just 22. By 2012, SIT2LRN offered over 30 different programs in a range of subject areas.

== Zero Fees Scheme ==
SIT is the only tertiary provider in New Zealand to offer a Zero Fees Scheme where New Zealand citizens and permanent residents are only required to pay material costs and not tuition fees. The scheme has been credited with revitalizing Invercargill after it attracted thousands of students south. The Zero Fees Scheme has also been extended to international students, in the form of Zero Fees English and Foundation Scholarships.

The Zero Fees Scheme delivers significant savings for students who study at SIT compared with other tertiary institutions. Since students need only pay for their material costs, many students graduate debt free. Students can save between NZ$7,000 to $14,000 on the cost of their bachelor's degrees.

The scheme was initiated in an attempt to jumpstart Invercargill's economy. In the late 1990s, Invercargill was suffering from job losses, closing businesses and a declining population. In an attempt to reverse this situation, and attract more young people to the city, the Zero Fees Scheme was implemented. The scheme saw community funders contribute $7.2 million over three years to effectively pay students’ tuition fees. All students had to pay was their material costs – for things like uniforms or textbooks. The expected boost in the student population meant that after that time – with more government funding for the extra equivalent full-time students – the scheme would become self-funding.

The success of the Zero Fees scheme has meant SIT has been able to keep fees for international students low. The Zero Fees Scheme has even been extended to international students, in the form of the Zero Fees English and Zero Fees Foundation Studies programs. These programs allow international students to study English or Foundation programs for free when they subsequently enroll in a one-year or longer mainstream academic program.

In early August 2022, Te Pūkenga's acting chief executive Peter Winder announced that SIT's zero fees program policy would be phased out from 2024 as part of the planned merger of SIT into the new mega polytechnic entity in January 2023. While SIT would maintain its zero fees program for the 2023 academic year, Winder indicated that Te Pūkenga would be adopting a "unified fees approach" in the near future.

== Facilities and equipment ==
The SIT Library has more than 25,000 books, 750,000 E-books, multiple online databases, and also magazines, DVDs and novels. Additional services include multi-function printers, wireless internet access and more than 20 computers for student use. There is also a group study room furnished with an overhead projector.

The SIT Gym is located on the corner of Tay and Conon Streets. It has recently undergone a complete refurbishment. Programs are available for fitness, rehabilitation, strength, health and high performance.

The School of Hospitality has two commercial training kitchens that can fit up to 20 students each. Each kitchen is equipped with equipment for each workstation, including six burner gas hobs and convection or gas ovens. The Bungalow Restaurant is an onsite restaurant that is used for training and theory as well as practice restaurant service operations open to the public throughout the year. Café and Bar service students also operate from the Bungalow Restaurant. The Vault Café is used as a real-life training environment where students prepare and present food and coffee to the public on a regular basis throughout the year.

== SIT Research Institute and Journal of Applied Research ==
SIT runs an applied research program designed to support the development of its community and New Zealand industry. The SIT Research Institute is an organization that works across the faculties and schools to support and promote staff research at SIT, as well as carry out research in collaboration with local and regional partners.

Since 2010 the SIT Research Institute has been involved in a number of local and national research projects including research projects with Water Safety New Zealand and Sport Southland to support safe swimming practices and with the Centre for Research on Children and Families at the University of Otago and Our Way Southland to strengthen parenting in the region. The SIT Research Institute also led The Committed Learners Project, a collaborative research project with other New Zealand Institutes of Technology that identified practices to foster student engagement.

The Southern Institute of Technology Journal of Applied Research (SITJAR) is an online journal that specializes in applied research in the vocational and educational sector. SITJAR is a double-blind, peer-refereed journal, that is freely accessible.

== Industry and community links ==
=== Industry links ===
SIT offers a range of learning modes. These include full-time and part-time, flexible mixed-mode delivery, workplace locations (including workplace training and assessments), apprenticeship schemes (managed and modern), multi-site arrangements with secondary schools and articulations. Many courses have work experience components and practicums. Southland Museum and Art Gallery

=== Community links ===
SIT has developed links with a range of community organizations, including local councils, iwi, trusts, government agencies, businesses, and other organizations. SIT worked with the Community Trust of Southland, the Invercargill Licensing Trust, the Invercargill City Council, the Southland District Council and many Southland businesses to launch the Zero Fees Scheme as well as subsequent initiatives. SIT has active relationships with Venture Southland, the region's economic development agency, and the Southland Chamber of Commerce.

SIT has sponsored and supported numerous Southland community organizations, such as Rugby Southland, Netball Southland, Basketball Southland, Southland Art Foundation, Southland Artist in Residence, as well as Southland's national motor-racing champion and Southland's Olympic representatives and Paralympic medal winner.

SIT provides SIT Centrestage for the benefit of the Southland Arts community. This includes the provision of weekly music and drama performances in the theatre by SIT students, and the annual Kids’ Concert for approximately 2,500 children.

SIT helped secure the Southland filming of Robert Sarkies film Two Little Boys, Claire Kelly's The Jub Jub Bird and the joint New Zealand–Denmark produced Weight of Elephants, in which SIT film students gained valuable work experience and subsequent employment in the industry. In 2010, SIT hosted the University Games for the first time in Southland. In 2011, SIT gifted the use of the SIT Arcade in Invercargill's central business district as the venue for the 2011 Rugby World Cup Fan Zone in Southland.

== Internationalisation ==
SIT hosts a rapidly growing number of international students. SIT's international strategy was adopted as an explicit attempt to address labour shortages in Southland. In 2012, over 626 students from 42 different countries around the world studied at SIT. SIT also has a cosmopolitan staff, with an eighth of its staff in 2012 hailing from overseas.

SIT has a number of international partnerships and is a member of the International Association of Universities.

== Student accommodation ==
SIT offers accommodation at the SIT Apartments. and homestay is available for international students.

From 2018 SIT offers the Mayor Tim Shadbolt Accommodation Bursary, open to students studying in Southland who are in their first year of tertiary study.
