= Jane Zusters =

New Zealand artist, photographer and painter

Jane Zusters (née Arbuckle; born 1951) is a New Zealand artist who works in painting, photography and ceramics. Her work is held in the permanent collections of Te Papa, Christchurch Art Gallery and Auckland Art Gallery.

== Biography ==
Zusters was born in Christchurch. She attended the University of Canterbury, graduating with a degree in English in 1973. She then moved to Fiji and taught at Navua High School. On her return to New Zealand she studied at University of Canterbury's School of Fine Arts for two years. In 1978 she was awarded a Queen Elizabeth II Arts Council grant.

While attending art school, Zusters studied painting, however also exhibited photographs at the McDougall Art Gallery. She later found the costs involved with photography to be prohibitive and began to explore other media, including drawing, ceramics, etching and sculpture.

In 1983, she moved to Auckland and lived in the central city until 1988. During this time she won an award at the Montana Art Awards, received a second grant from the Queen Elizabeth II Arts Council (in 1986) and received the Tokoroa Art Award (in 1988). She then relocated to Waiheke Island and lived there til 2004, when she returned to the South Island. In 1992, Zusters visited Berlin on a Goethe Institute scholarship, and in 1995 she was invited to be a guest artist-in-residence at the University of Canterbury. In 1994, she was joint winner of the Lillian Ida Smith Award.

In 2003, Zusters completed a master of fine arts degree in photography at Whitecliffe College of Art and Design. In 2004, she held the position of William Hodges Fellow in Southland.
