= Heather Straka =

New Zealand artist and photographer

- Born: 1972 (age 53–54)
- Education: Elam School of Art, Auckland
- Occupation: Artist

Heather Straka (born 1972) is a New Zealand artist, based in Auckland, who primarily works with the media of painting and photography. Straka is well known as a painter that utilises a lot of detail. She often depicts cultures that are not her own, which has caused controversy at times. Her work engages with themes of economic and social upheaval in interwar China, the role of women in Arabic society and Māori in relation to colonisation in New Zealand. Eventually, the figure became important in Straka's practice and she began to use photographs as the starting point for some of her works and "Increasingly too the body feminine has become her milieu".

== Education ==
During secondary school, Straka attended night classes studying art. She was accepted into Elam School of Fine Arts where she studied sculpture. She graduated with a Bachelor of Fine Arts in 1994. Tutors of hers included Christine Hellyar and Greer Twiss. Once she had graduated she spent five years in France where she worked with the artist Julia Morison and learned about painting, subsequently switching to painting as her medium. Straka completed her master's degree at the University Of Canterbury School Of Fine Arts in 2000.

== Artworks and major exhibitions ==
In Straka's practice she works with contentious subject matter and questions tradition. Her series of paintings appropriating portraits of Māori chiefs by artists such as Charles Goldie, Gottfried Lindauer and colonial photographer, W.H.T. Partington were exhibited in an exhibition entitled Paradise Lost at the Jonathan Smart Gallery in 2005. Straka copied these paintings with her trade mark polished and detailed style but added new elements such as red tinged skin, tattoos, horns and halos. Depictions of Māori chiefs as Satan and as angels have recalled "the efforts of zealous missionaries who searched for godliness within Māori society." Some of the portraits have a Sacred Heart placed on the chest of the figure. The fact that Straka did not receive permission from iwi to paint these images caused offense and outrage. In relation to these works Gina Irish has asked "Just who owns the image? Straka, Goldie, Lindauer or Partington? The sitter or the model's descendants? Iwi? How can the individuals depicted by these colonial masters and now Straka, ever be truly reclaimed?"

In 2010 Straka exhibited her major project The Asian. For this project Straka commissioned artists in the Chinese painting village of Dafen to make 50 copies of her painting The Asian (2009). All 51 paintings were exhibited at the Dunedin Public Art Gallery with each painting have slight differences such as the hue and subtle additions of detail. The image mimics Chinese poster girls used in the 1920s and 1930s to sell products to the Chinese from the West. The project “as a whole questions notions of authenticity, originality and anonymity versus the individuality of the artist's hand and eye."

In 2009 Straka exhibited her show Do Not Resuscitate at the Blue Oyster Art Project Space and again at the Jonathan Smart Gallery in 2010. In this exhibition, Straka developed large format photographs that reference the Japanese concept of the ero kawaii which Andrew Paul Wood has described as “that disturbingly pedophilic hybrid of Sanryo kitschy Hello Kitty cuteness and kinderwhore Lolita coquettishness”. The exhibition consisted of a wall of individual portraits of young female Japanese, Chinese and Korean models and a tableau vivant of the same girls gathered around a blond corpse on a gurney.

== Awards and residencies ==
- 2012 William Hodges Fellowship, Invercargill, NZ.
- 2009 Wallace Arts Trust/ Altes Spital Residency, Solothurn, Switzerland.
- 2008 Frances Hodgkins Fellowship, Otago University, Dunedin, NZ.
- 2002 Pierce Lowe Award, Royal Overseas League, London, UK.
- 2001 Ethel Susan Jones Travelling Scholarship, University of Canterbury, NZ.
- 2000 Ethel Rose Overton Scholarship, University of Canterbury, NZ.

== Solo exhibitions ==
- 2017 The Strangers Room, Trish Clarke Gallery, Auckland.
- 2016 X Marks the Spot, Nadine Milne Gallery, Arrowtown.
- 2016 The Honeytrap Returns, Pageblackie Gallery, Wellington, NZ.
- 2015 Somebodies Eyes, Trish Clark Gallery, Auckland NZ.
- 2014 The Creator, Page Blackie Gallery, Wellington, NZ.
- 2013 Burqababe, Page Blackie Gallery & Auckland Art Fair, NZ.
- 2013 Blood Lust, Jonathan Smart Gallery & Museum, Invercargill, NZ.
- 2012 The Noble Savage, Jonathan Smart Gallery, Christchurch, NZ.
- 2011 The Asian, Rotorua Museum, Rotorua, NZ.
- 2010 The Attendants, Page Blackie Gallery, Wellington, NZ.
- 2009 Do Not Resuscitate, Blue Oyster Art Project Space, Dunedin, NZ.
- 2009 The Sleeping Room, Hocken Collections Gallery, Dunedin, NZ.
- 2008 Donor, Jonathan Smart Gallery, Christchurch, NZ.
- 2007 The Banquet, Anna Bibby Gallery, Auckland, NZ.
- 2006 Selling Happiness, Jonathan Smart Gallery, Christchurch, NZ.
- 2005 Paradise Lost, Jonathan Smart Gallery, Christchurch, NZ.
- 2004 First Impressions, Milford Gallery, Dunedin, NZ.

== Publications ==
- Heather Straka: The Asian, published 2010 by Dunedin Public Art Gallery ISBN 0-908910-60-6

== Collections ==
- Christchurch Art Gallery Te Puna o Waiwhetu has Spectator - Double the life (2000)
- Dunedin Public Art Gallery
- Southland Museum & Art Gallery
- James Wallace Art Trust
