= City to Sea Bridge =

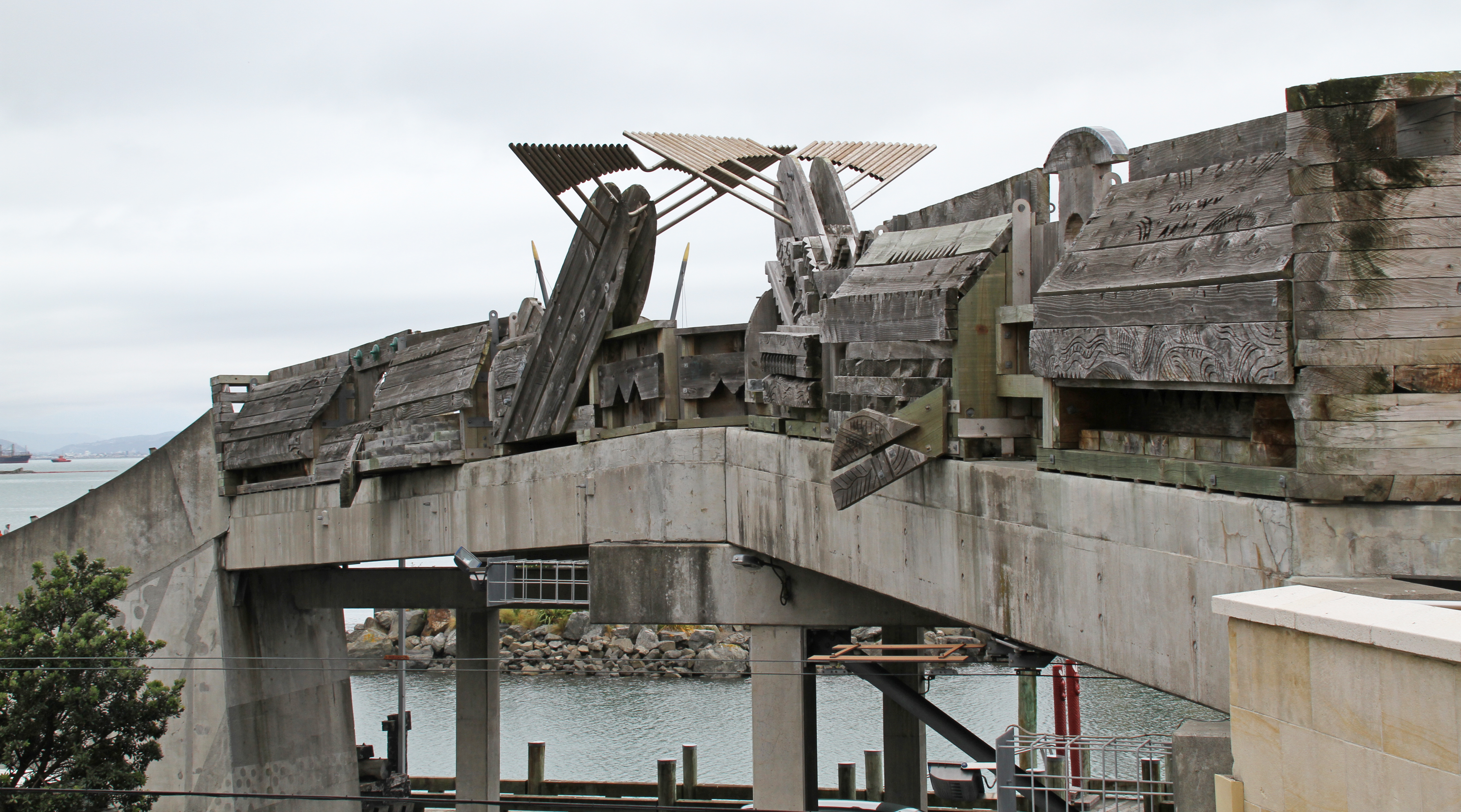
- The bridge from Civic Square looking towards the lagoon
- Coordinates: 41°17′20″S 174°46′43″E
- Carries: Pedestrians
- Crosses: Jervois Quay
- Locale: Wellington City, New Zealand

Characteristics
- Material: Reinforced concrete and timber

History
- Opened: 1993

Location
- Interactive map of City to Sea Bridge

The City to Sea Bridge is a pedestrian bridge and public artwork located in Wellington City, New Zealand. Opened on 31 October 1993, the wedge-shaped bridge crosses arterial road Jervois Quay, connecting the public spaces of Civic Square to the Wellington waterfront precinct at Whairepo Lagoon. Around the square are the Michael Fowler Centre, Wellington Town Hall, Wellington City Art Gallery and Wellington Central Library.

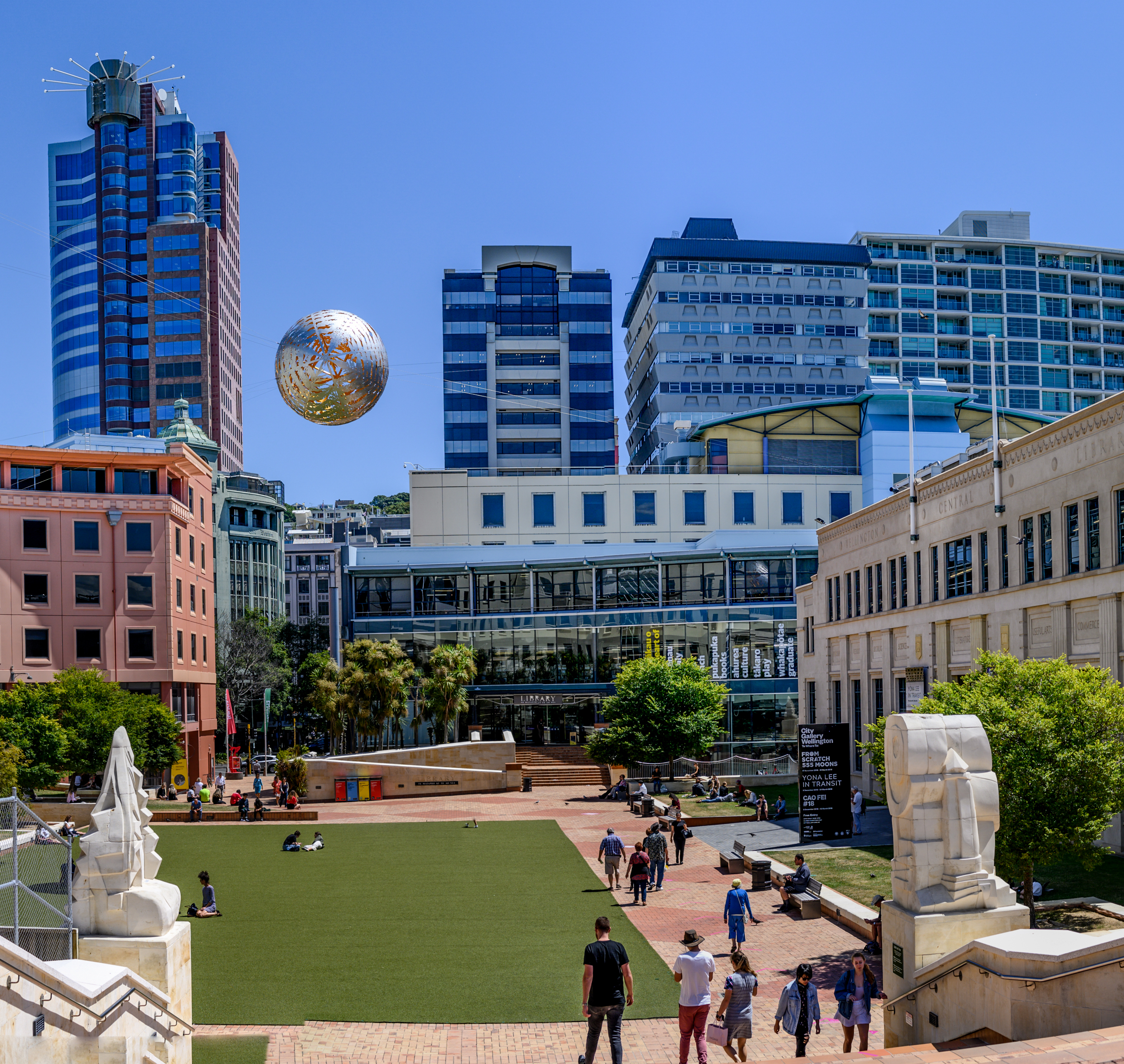
Looking from the bridge down into Civic Square, with Matt Pine's sculptures at the base of the stairs

In 1983, the Wellington Civic Trust ran a competition for ideas to address the separation of the city from the harbour. Wellington City Council developed a brief for a bridge that could address the significance of the waterfront and public space, and, importantly, that it should be a bi-cultural project that celebrated a relationship between Māori and Pākehā. Architects Rewi Thompson and John Gray were appointed. Gray was one of the founders of Victoria University of Wellington's architecture department and one of the lead consultants of the winning design team, Paperchase, which led the development of the Wellington central harbour waterfront, converting it from an 'industrial wasteland' to an accessible public space. Gray and Thompson collaborated with artists Paratene Matchitt and Matt Pine, who contributed the sculptural artworks.

The primary role of the bridge was to connect the city to the sea, as part of an ongoing transformation of the waterfront and urban cultural centre. It was also designed to be a public meeting place, a space to ask questions and reflect on both public and environmental concerns.

The use of manmade materials and angular sculpted forms on the city side shifts at the midpoint to use more natural and organic forms at the point where pedestrians first encounter the ocean and walk towards the harbour. A large pyramid-shaped structure and Matt Pine’s classically shaped limestone sculptures frame the base of the brick steps leading from the library and City Gallery. In contrast to this, lengths of abandoned hardwood that had previously lined the wharf were used to form the original steps of the structure on the side where pedestrians walk down towards the sea. The steepness of the sea side of the bridge was proposed by Gray and Thompson to mimic the uplifted and eroded landforms of Wellington and symbolise a point of arrival and change. The concrete base was designed to mimic a stone, cliff edge and the steep, uplifted topography that would have been discovered at Wellington's original shoreline between Lambton Harbour and the uplifted Terrace hillside, prior to the reclamation of the land on which the inner city stands.

The bridge is adorned with non-traditional wooden sculptures carved by Matchitt out of Californian redwood grown on Matchitt's farm. These formed the balustrades, that include hidden alcoves where people could sit, huddle, and look out, down and through. Sculptures of different creatures adorn the outer edges. On one side are two whales representing the taniwha Ngake and Whātaitai, who according to the Māori creation story of Wellington Harbour, carved a path to the open sea and turned to stone and earth to rest upon the shore. On the other side are two large seagulls, said to represent welcome and festivity. Matchitt said the concept came from the fact that seagulls always seem to perch on bridges.

On top of the bridge, six tall pouwhenua point upward toward the sky, with metal shapes of stars, moons, and other symbols representing celestial navigation. These symbols reference those found on the Te Wepu flag captured by Te Kooti in 1868. Matchitt's work was influenced by Te Kooti's philosophies and he used these symbols in other sculptures as well as the bridge.

On the city side of the bridge is a split pyramid topped with pounamu (greenstone), representing Te Waipounamu (the South Island) from where Māui threw his net to fish up the North Island (Te Ika a Māui). Patterns in the brick paving represent Maui's line, fish hook and net. At the Civic Square base of the bridge are two Oamaru stone sculptures by Matt Pine, titled Prow and Capital. A plaque here states:

Capital and Prow: The sculptures by Matt Pine on either side of the stairs are part of a series of 10 works called Reflections on an Ancient Past. Capital (above) is based on European classical architectural elements with koru form on the edges. Prow (on the other side) depicts a Maori canoe prow with Taniko weave motif on the edges - a mix of European and Maori cultural elements.

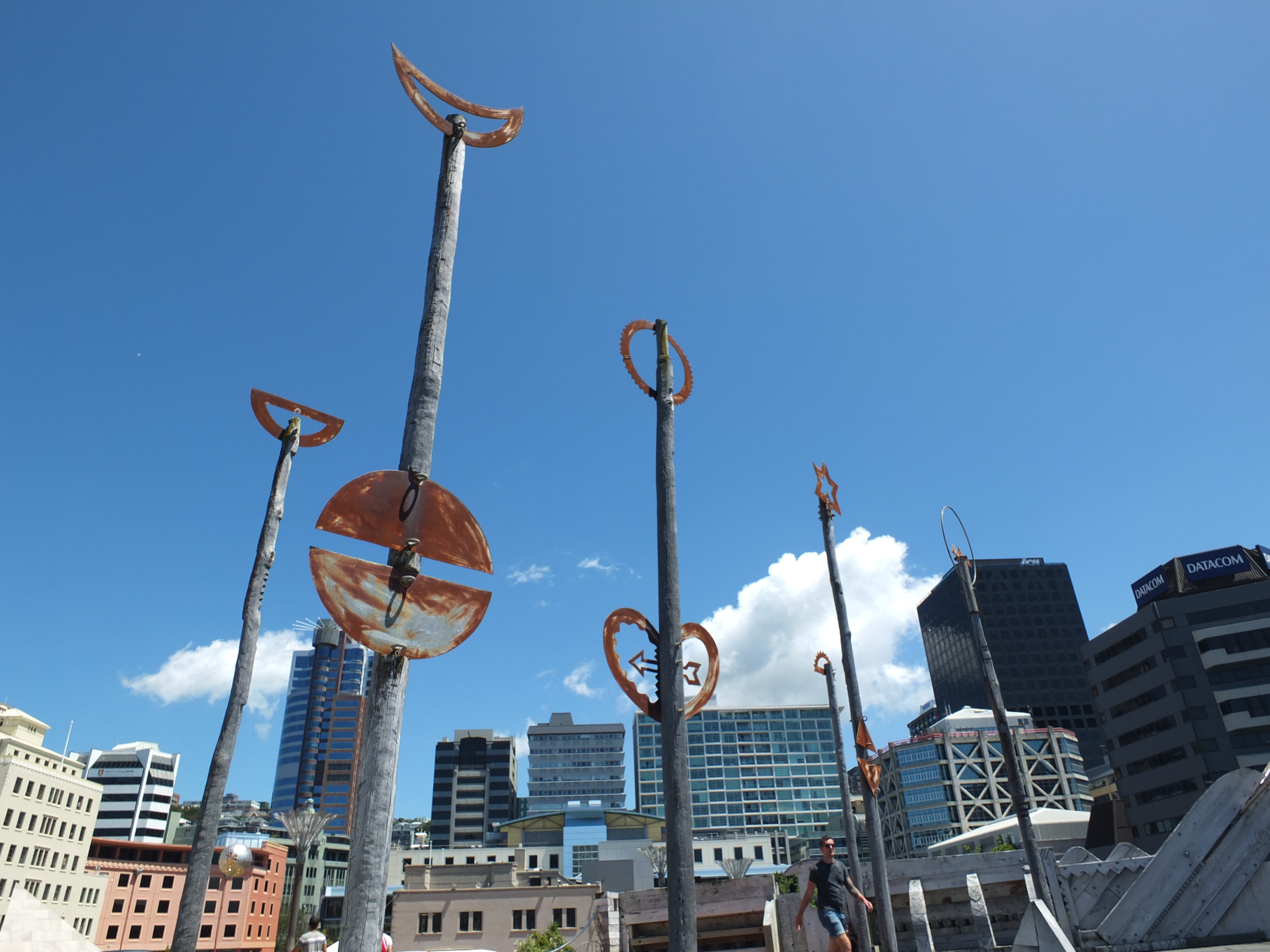
Para Matchitt poles decorated with symbols

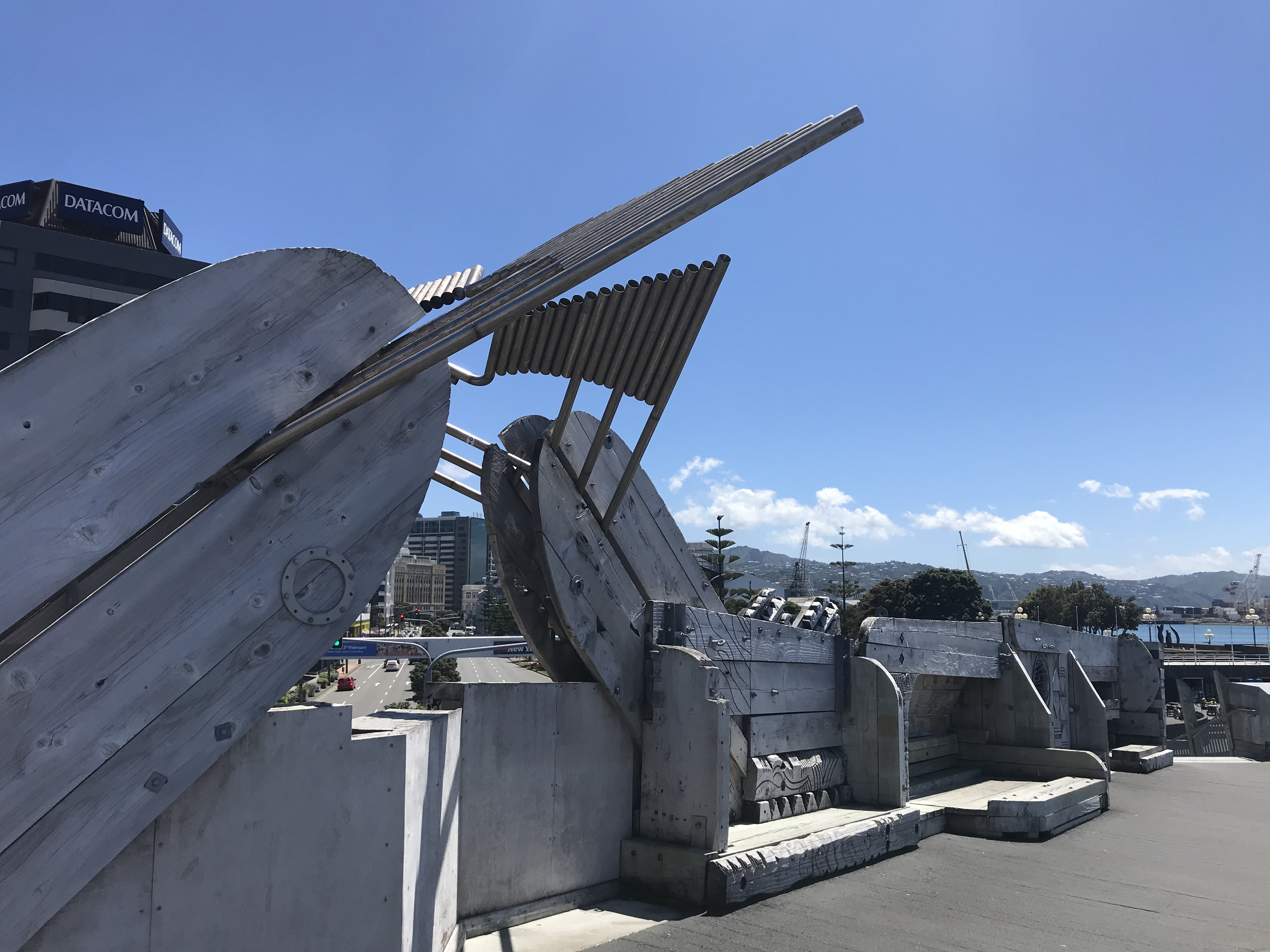
Whale sculptures

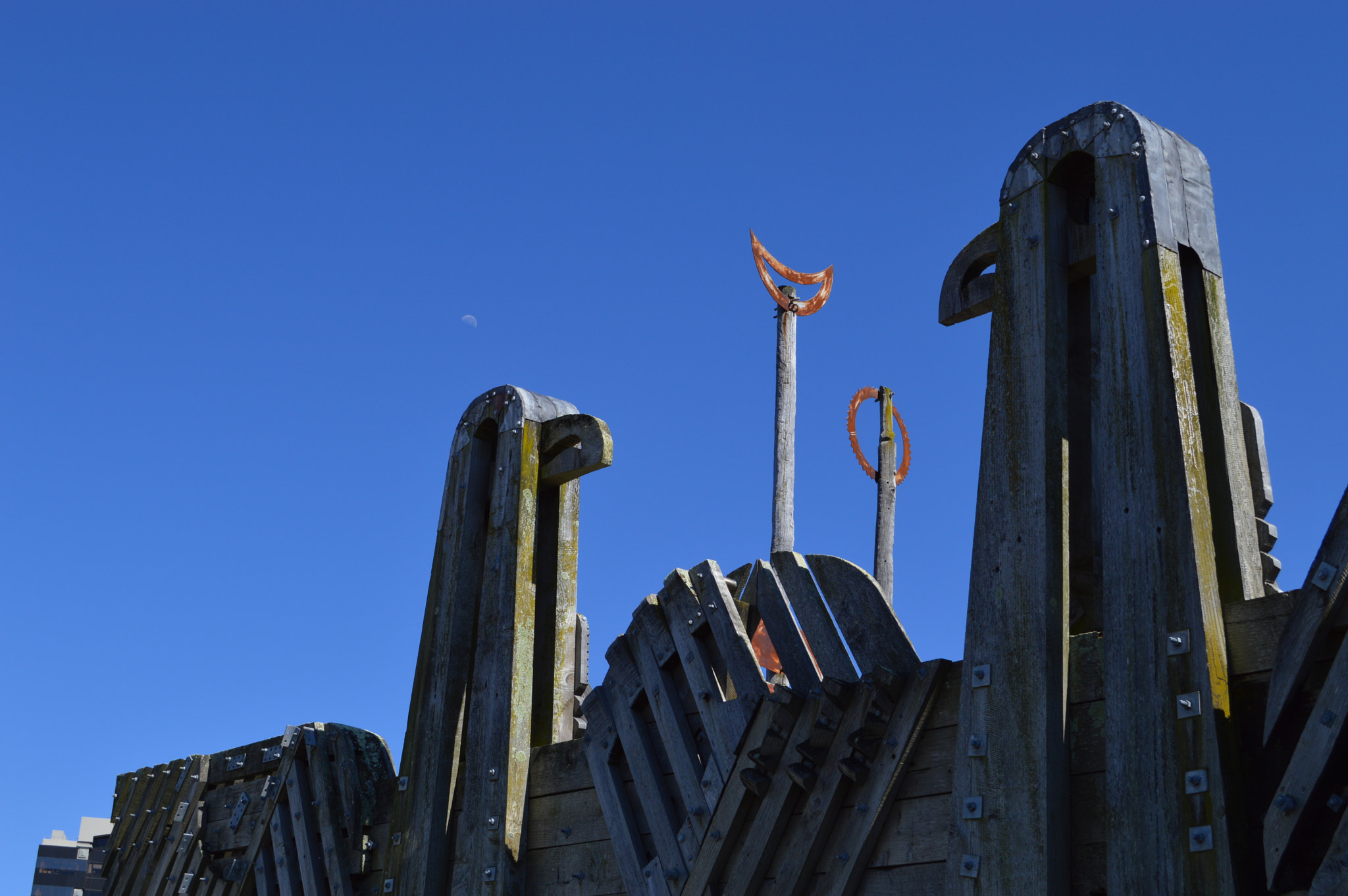
Bird sculptures

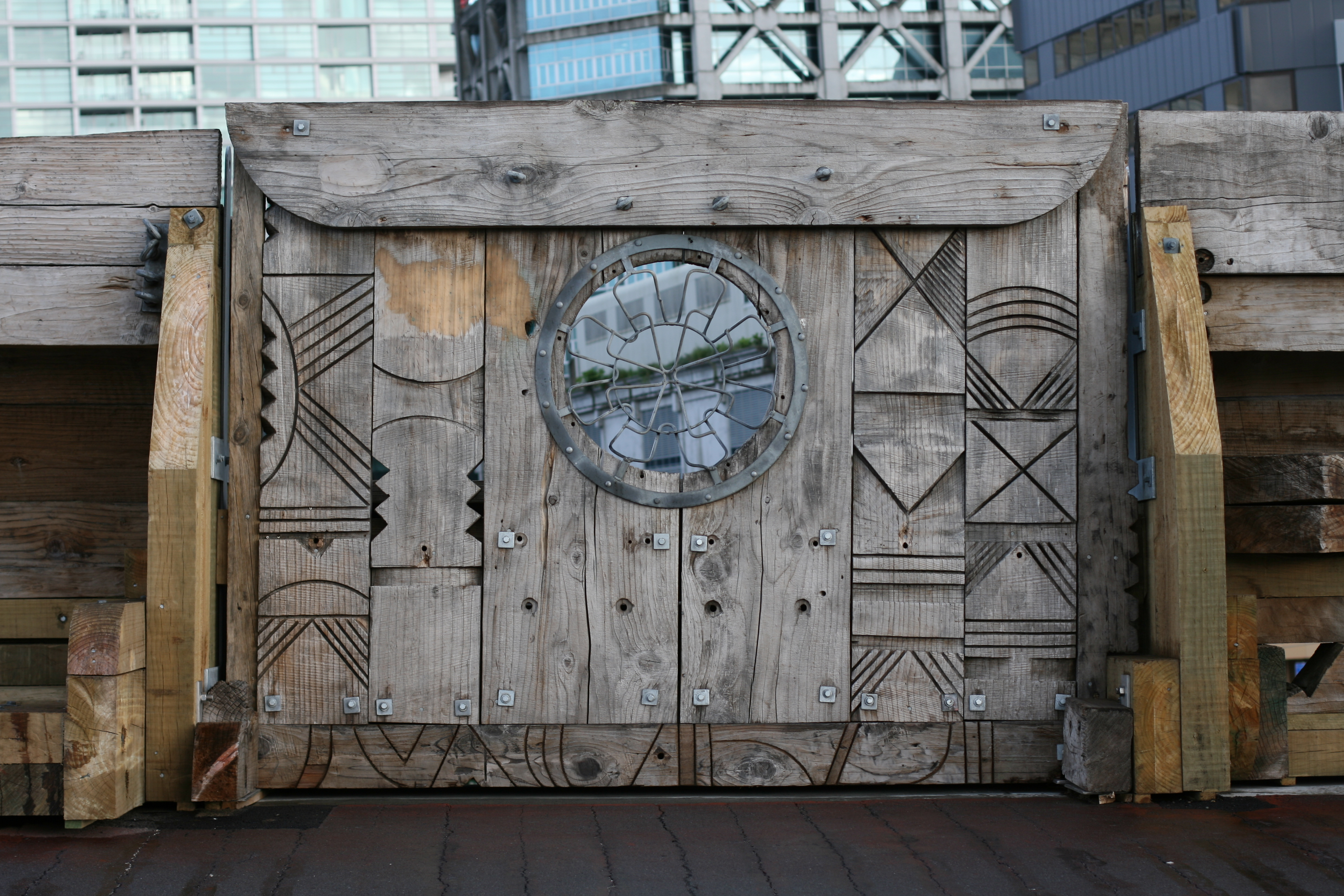
Grill-work porthole in bridge

== Reception ==
Art historian Robin Woodward identifies City to Sea Bridge as what he saw as one of the top sculptures that "[integrated] the urban and the sculptural" in New Zealand, alongside Terry Stringer's Mountain Fountain (1981) and Greer Twiss' Karangahape Rocks (1969). Public reaction to the bridge was mixed when it was built, but it has become a tourist attraction in its own right.

== History ==
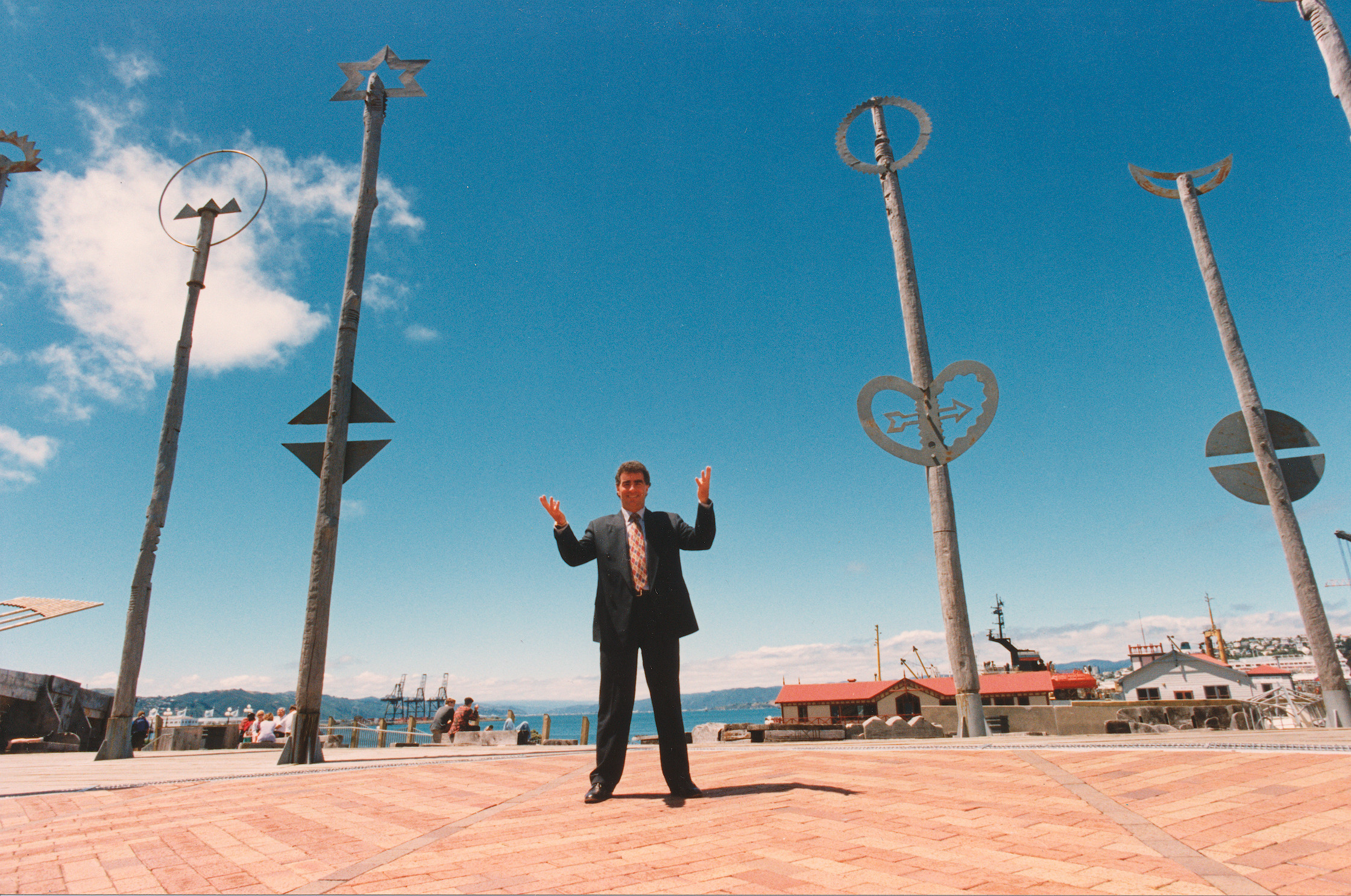
Then-Mayor of Wellington Mark Blumsky on the bridge in 1996

Problems with the bridge's design and construction have been ongoing. Remedial work was undertaken immediately after the bridge opened when it was found that small children could fall through gaps, and in 1995, it was discovered that gaps appeared if one leant on the handrail. Inadequate drainage leading to rot was discovered in 2005 and urgent strengthening work to prevent the bridge's "unexpected collapse" was undertaken in 2010 and 2011. The bridge's superstructure and frame were built to then-current standards, but its piles were built to an outdated 1984 standard, and do not extend fully down to bedrock. In August 2018, an engineering assessment based on a visual inspection found the piles were built to handle lower earthquake loads than the rest of the bridge, but noted that these structural problems might actually improve its resistance to earthquakes, by taking load off other parts of the structure during an earthquake, and that previous strengthening work had been done correctly, raising it to 40 per cent of New Building Standard.

Between 15 October 2011 and 31 January 2012, protesters set up a camp on the raised grassed area on the Civic Square side of the bridge. The protest, 'Occupy Wellington', began in support of the international Occupy movement but during the occupation the focus changed to an emphasis on homelessness. The protest cost ratepayers more than $65,000 in legal fees, security and repairing damage to the lawn.

== Proposed demolition ==
The Wellington City Council consultation summary of the 2021 Precinct Framework incorrectly identified Ian Athfield as the designer of the City to Sea Bridge and commented that Mana Whenua were not represented in the area. The same document identified the potential for poor seismic performance and also highlighted a disconnection between Civic Square, the central city, and the waterfront.

In November 2023, the Council announced that as part of its ten-year plan it would cut $170m from its budget for Civic Square and the City to Sea Bridge. Councillors voted against spending the $230m needed to strengthen the bridge and the Capital E building adjoining it, and instead allocated $65m to look at three options, one involving strengthening and two others the demolition of both structures. One of the original architects, John Gray, began a campaign to save the bridge, stating that losing it would be like "losing a brother".

Councillor Iona Pannett unsuccessfully pushed for an amendment to delay the decision to demolish the bridge and in December 2024 the council voted 11–6 in favour of demolition. Demolition was expected to begin in January 2025 but did not occur because Wellington Civic Trust requested a judicial review, with a two-day court hearing starting on 28 April 2025, arguing that the public was not adequately consulted about the demolition. The review was dismissed on 2 September.

The bridge was closed on 8 September 2025 in preparation for demolition. The preparations stopped a few days later because the council was waiting on the Sixth National Government's recommendations from its earthquake-prone building and seismic risk management review. The bridge was also reopened in late September. On 29 September the government announced a reform of the system of classifying buildings as earthquake-prone, and the council stated that the demolition would remain paused while an assessment was undertaken to determine whether the bridge was earthquake-prone under the new system.

On 5 February 2026, Wellington City Council voted to "renew" the bridge and "minimally strengthen" the Capital E building underneath it, at a cost of $15 million. The Capital E building would be strengthened to the minimum level required and under new regulations would be classed as non-earthquake prone. Potential tenants could choose to do additional strengthening work. Seismic issues identified with the bridge would not be addressed but it would reopen to public use.
