= Te Ngākau Civic Square =

Public square in Wellington

Coordinates: 41.288840°S 174.777138°E

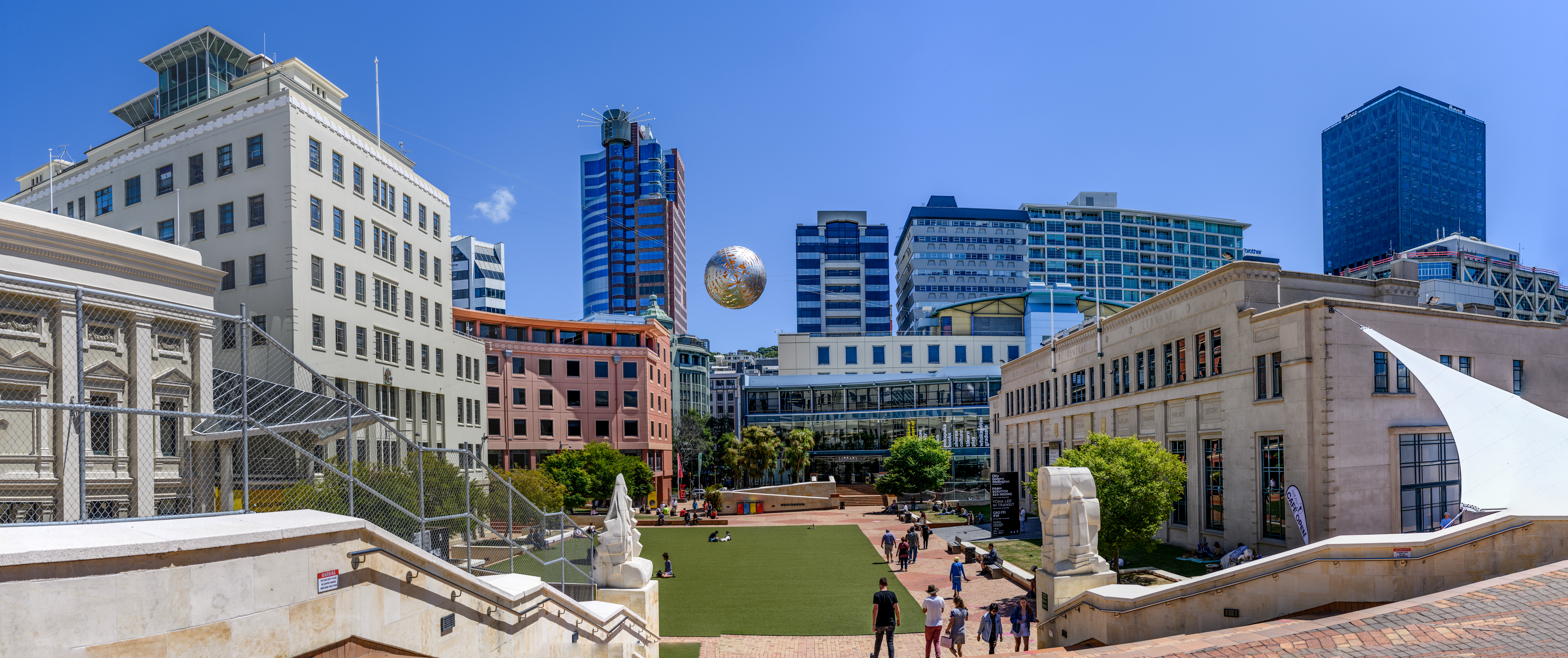
Panorama of Te Ngākau Civic Square from the City to Sea Bridge in 2019

Te Ngākau Civic Square is a public square in central Wellington, New Zealand, between the Wellington central business district to the north and the Te Aro entertainment district to the south. The square is bounded by Jervois Quay, Harris Street, Victoria Street and Wakefield Street

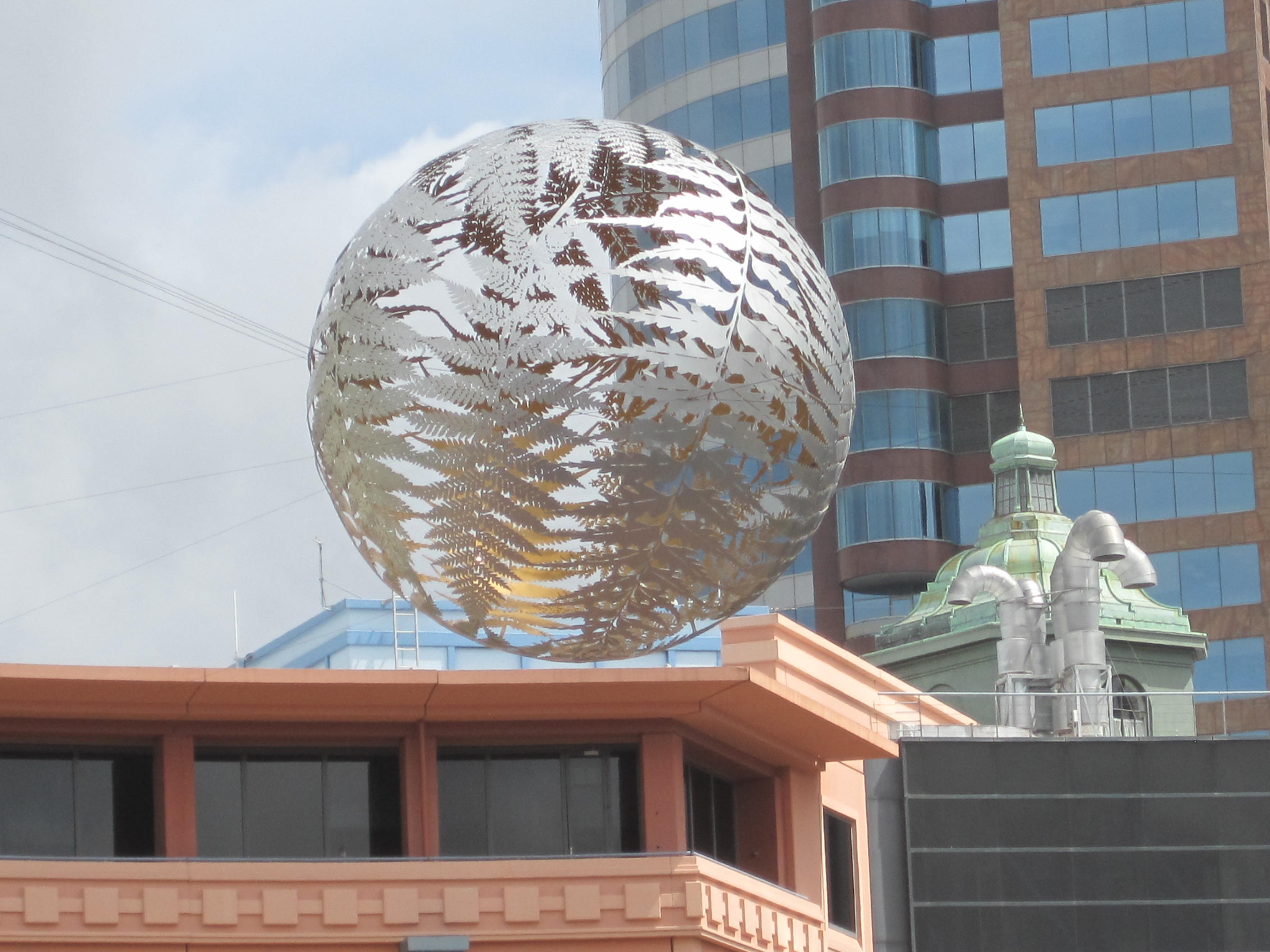
Close-up of Neil Dawson sculpture Ferns

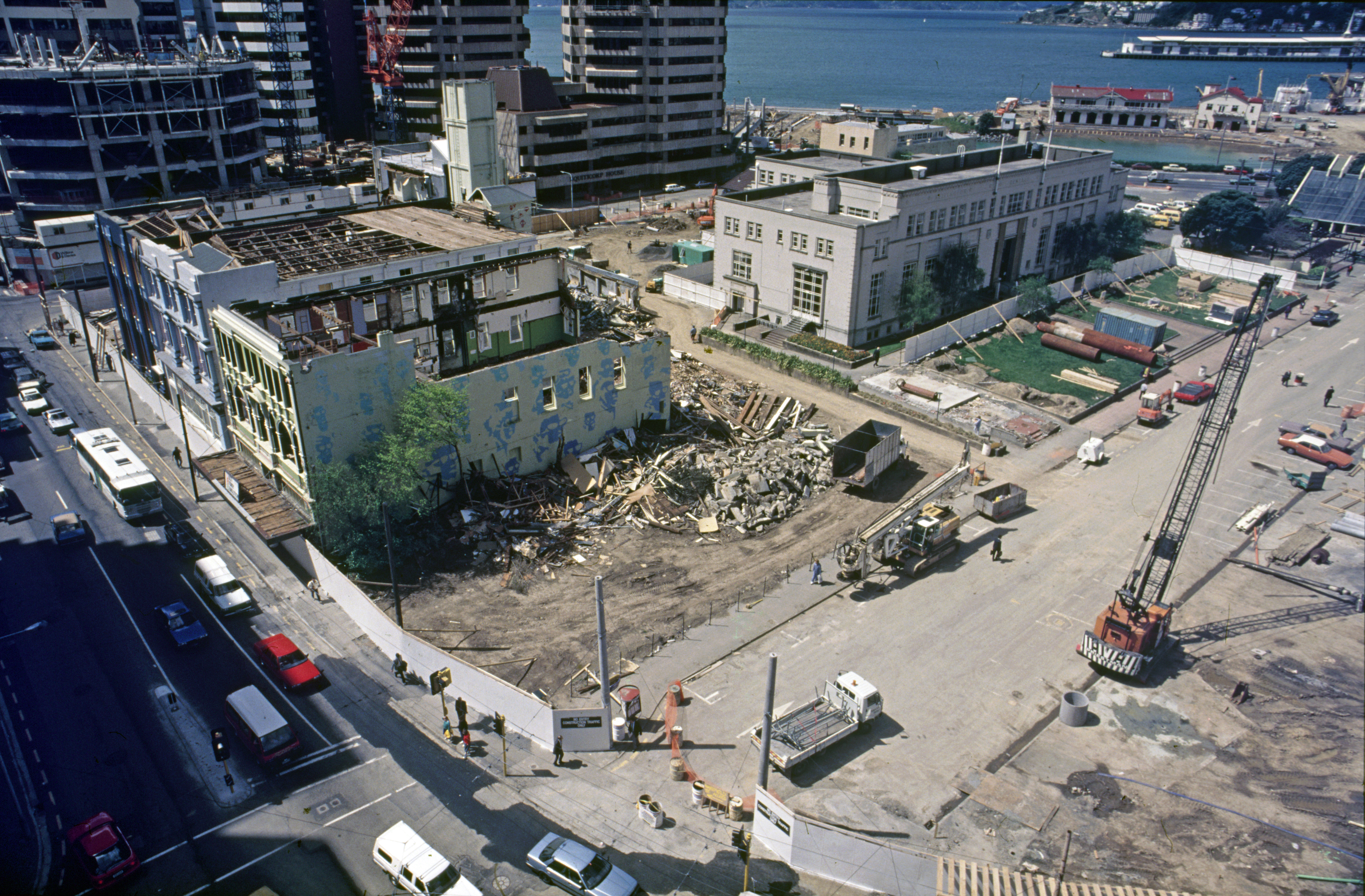
Construction of Civic Square c. 1988. Mercer Street is closed and will become part of the square.

The square is enclosed by council buildings, each with a distinctive architectural style: Wellington Town Hall and council offices, the Michael Fowler Centre, the Central Library, the City to Sea Bridge, and the City Gallery. The main tiled area is the roof of the underground library car park.

The square is paved with terracotta bricks and has Ferns, a Neil Dawson sculpture, suspended 14 metres above its centre. Ferns is a 3.4 metre diameter sphere using sculpted leaves of several ferns endemic to New Zealand. The wide City to Sea pedestrian bridge acts as a gateway from Wellington's waterfront to Civic Square. Other points of access are via a path next to Michael Fowler Centre, a wide entrance from Wakefield Street that was formerly framed by a portico above the road, and paths from Harris Street around the City Gallery.

The square is used for public events and is a popular place for office workers to eat their lunch on warm summer days.

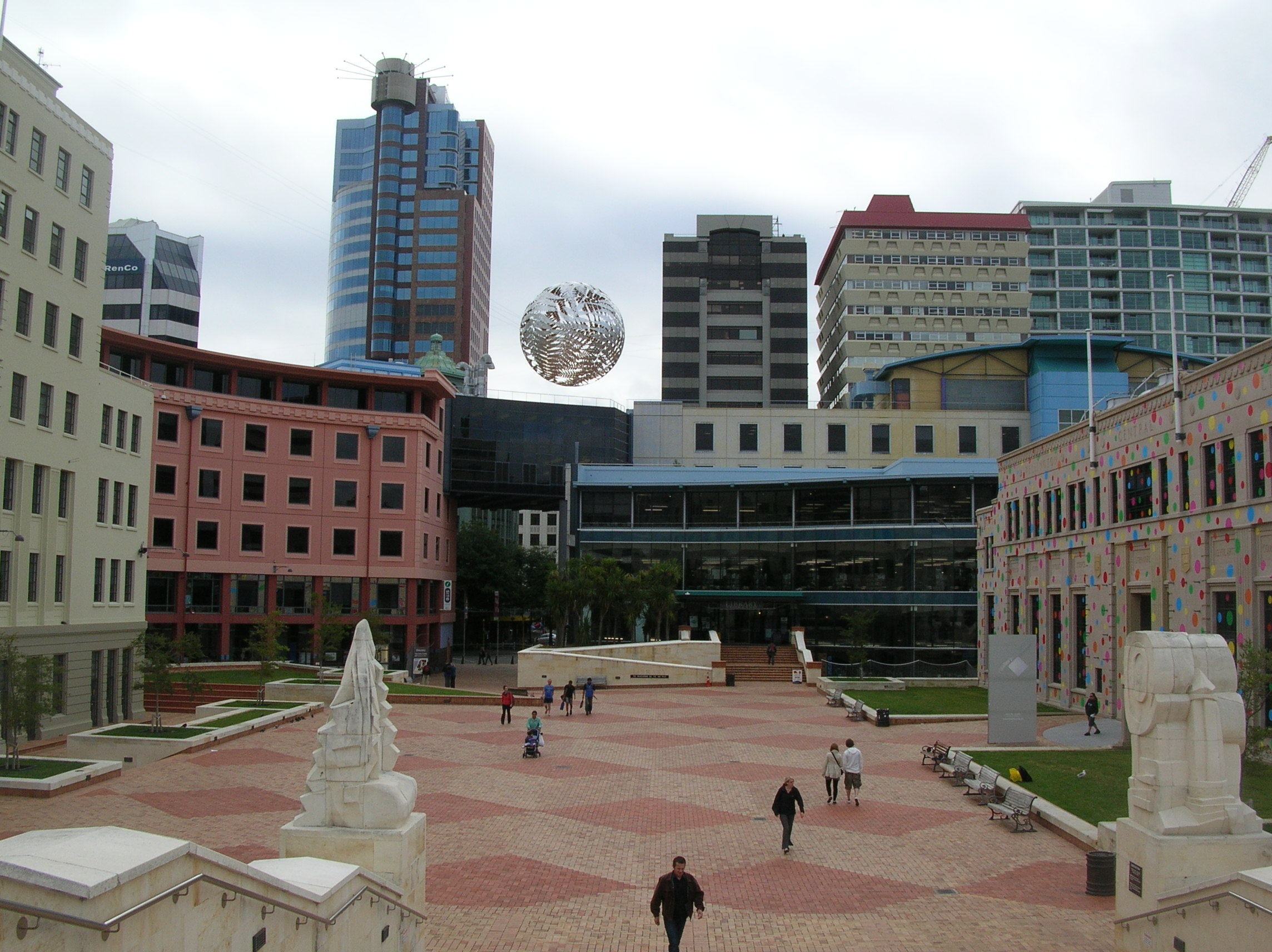
Te Ngākau Civic Square in February 2010

== History ==
The first real plans for the Civic Square date back to 1943, when the Architectural Research Group proposed a public square surrounded by civic buildings including the then-new library, a new town hall, theatres, and an underground car park in the area under the front of the library. A council administration building next to the existing town hall was approved by the government in 1945 and the foundations were laid in 1948, but the nine-storey building was not completed until December 1955. By 1957 town planners were considering building a new town hall, but this did not happen until the Michael Fowler Centre was built in the 1980s.

In 1964, Wellington City Council zoned an area bounded by Jervois Quay and Mercer, Cuba and Harris Streets as 'Civic Centre', and later bought leases for properties in the area with a view to constructing a new town hall and civic precinct.

In 1974, Wellington City Council commissioned Professor Robert Kennedy to design a civic precinct in the area bounded by Jervois Quay, Wakefield Street, Victoria Street and Harris Street. Kennedy's plan involved the closure of part of Mercer Street to create a pedestrian plaza, and Kennedy assumed that the town hall would be demolished and replaced with a new building. However, there was public opposition to demolition of the town hall, and in 1983 the council decided to retain the building even though the Michael Fowler Centre had been built right next door.

In 1987, Wellington City Council appointed Fletcher Development and Construction Ltd as project developers for the civic square. Fletchers brought in architects Maurice Tebbs, Gordon Moller and Ian Athfield, with Athfield as chief architect. The project involved building a new library, conversion of the existing library into the City Gallery, extension and refurbishment of City Council buildings, earthquake strengthening and refurbishment of the Town Hall, car parking space, design of the new public space and a link to the waterfront. The project was completed in 1992.

Civic Square was officially opened with a programme of events called 'Square Affair' on 22 and 23 November 1991. At that time, Civic Square had the Māori name 'Te Marae Ātea'. On 14 June 2018, as part of the City Council's new te reo Māori policy, Te Taiahu, the square was renamed to 'Te Ngākau Civic Square'. The new name, meaning 'the heart', was gifted to the city by local iwi, Taranaki Whānui ki te Upoko o te Ika a Māui.

Civic Square was closed in January 2025 for basement strengthening, repaving, landscaping and the addition of new water features, play areas and seating. The square was re-opened to the public in March 2026.

== Buildings and structures surrounding Te Ngākau Civic Square ==
=== Michael Fowler Centre ===
The Michael Fowler Centre is a concert hall and convention centre at the south-east corner of Te Ngākau Civic Square, with its entrance on Wakefield Street. Construction began in 1980, and the centre officially opened on 16 September 1983. It was designed by Miles Warren and Maurice Mahoney of Warren and Mahoney. It is named after the primary promoter of its construction, Sir Michael Fowler, at the time the mayor of Wellington.

=== Wellington Town Hall ===
Wellington Town Hall (also known as the Old Town Hall) is the oldest building in Te Ngākau Civic Square. It opened in December 1904.

In 1980 the Michael Fowler Centre was built immediately in front of the Town Hall's main entrance, in anticipation of the older building's demolition. However the New Zealand Historic Places Trust (since renamed to Heritage New Zealand) persuaded the City Council to retain the Town Hall. As part of the creation of Civic Square, the Town Hall underwent full refurbishment in 1991–1992. The building was closed to the public after the 2013 Seddon earthquake for extensive strengthening work. In 2014, earthquake strengthening was put on hold after cost projections increased due to unforeseen technical issues. In March 2017 Wellington City Council announced its intention to bring the Town Hall up to 100% of the New Zealand building regulations at a cost of $85 million. As restoration work began, further complexities were uncovered, and the council extended the budget. The extra work required included seismic base isolation to better secure the long term future of the building, while delaying the opening by a further two years. In May 2022 the council announced that the opening would be further delayed to January 2025, with an increased estimated cost of $182 million. In 2023, the council agreed to a cost increase to $329 million, due to the poor condition and excessive waterlogging of the reclaimed land under the building. This has also affected the adjacent Michael Fowler Centre, which is due to be earthquake strengthened before 2030.

=== Municipal Office Building ===
The Municipal Office Building was designed by Fearn Page and Haughton in a plain classical style and completed in 1951. The building was refurbished as part of the development of Civic Square. In 2012 the building was rated as being at 35-45 percent of the building code for earthquake resilience. In 2017, Victoria University of Wellington stated that it wished to lease the Municipal Office Building for both its New Zealand School of Music–Te Kōkī and the New Zealand Symphony Orchestra, and there were plans to strengthen the building. However, in December 2020 Wellington City Council announced that it planned to demolish the building, and the Civic Administration Building adjoining it, because it was uneconomic to do earthquake-strengthening.

=== Civic Administration Building ===
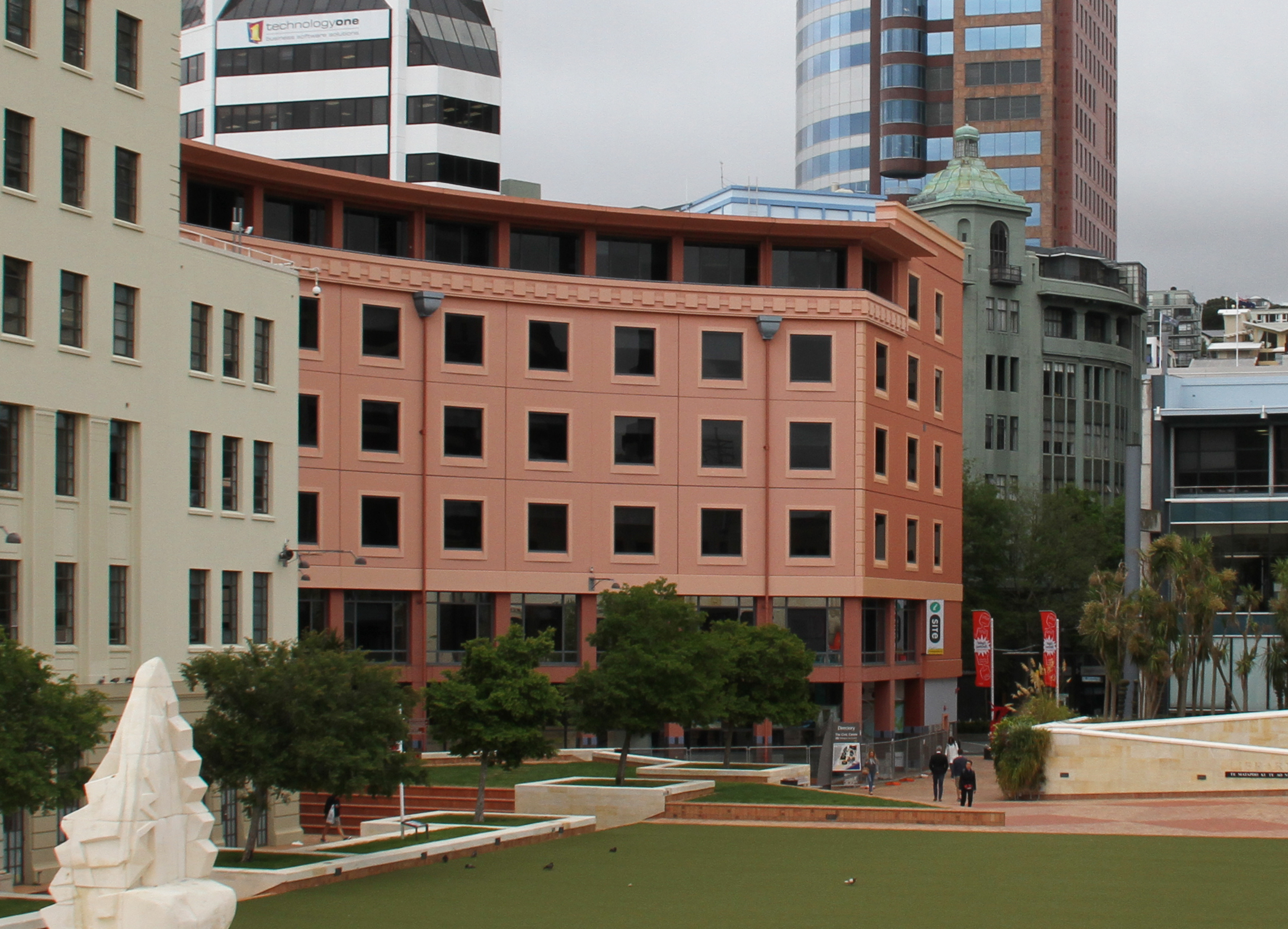
The Civic Administration Building in 2016

The six-storey Civic Administration Building (CAB) was designed by architects Stephenson and Turner and completed in 1992. The building follows the curve of Wakefield Street and fills in the south-west corner of the square. The CAB is joined to the older Municipal Office Building by a large glazed atrium. Originally it was joined to the new central library building by a portico on the third storey, but that was removed in 2014-2015. The building had a colonnade along both of its frontages to Wakefield Street and to the square. The exterior was formed from pre-cast concrete panels, and the building interior was designed with raised access floors with under-floor ventilation and access to wired services. Attention was paid to the durability of the concrete used in the building, which was expected to last a long time.

The CAB was closed after suffering structural damage in the 2016 Kaikōura earthquake. Props were installed inside the building so that workers could enter to retrieve items. More cracks in the floors were discovered in 2020. In March 2024, Wellington City Council confirmed that the building had suffered irreparable damage in the 2016 earthquake. Demolition was finished in February 2025.

=== Wellington Central Library ===
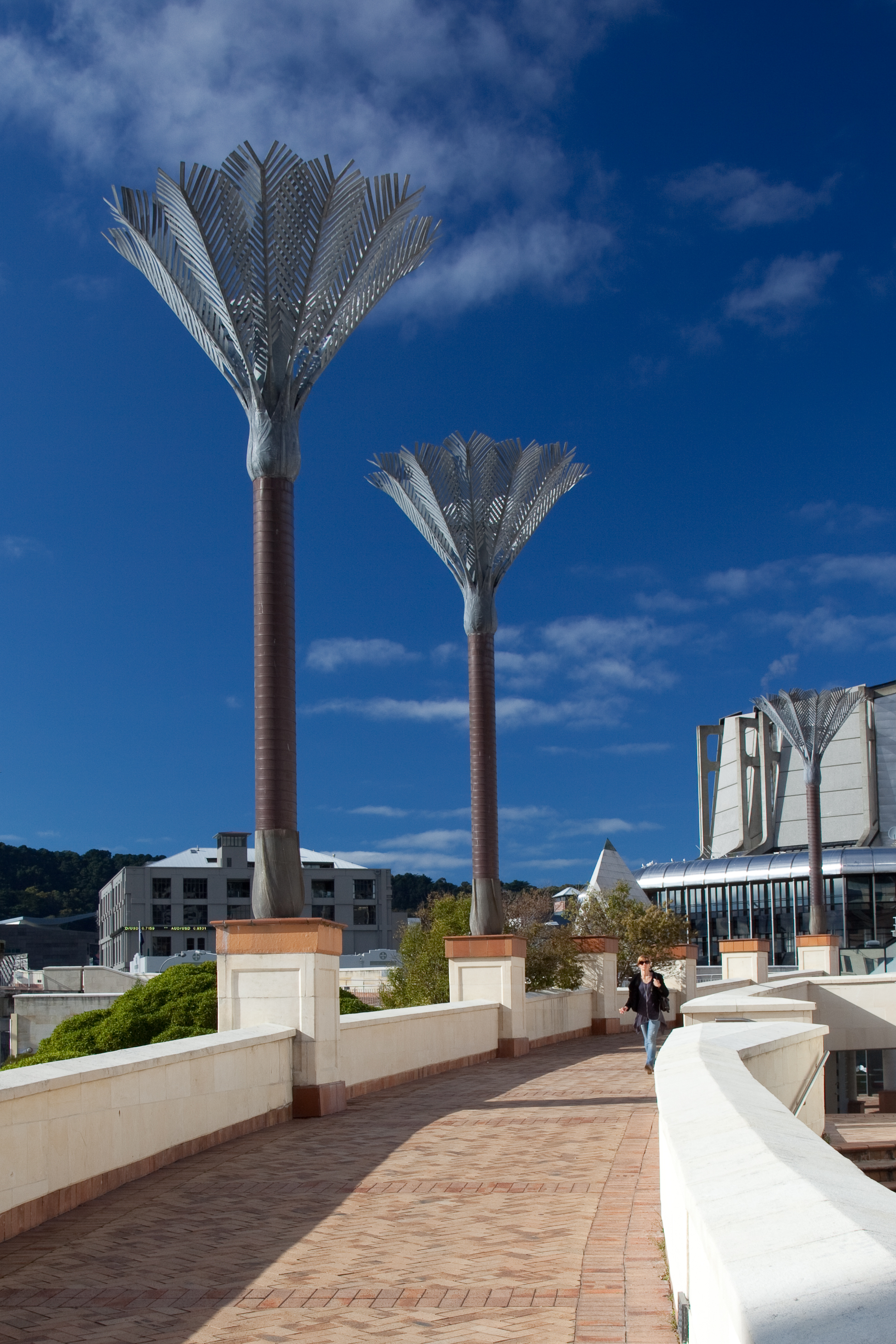
Nikau palms near the end of the colonnade, looking towards Civic Square and the Michael Fowler Centre

In 1989, Athfield Architects were commissioned to design a new Wellington Central Library. The library was built by Fletcher Building and Construction, and opened in 1991.

The building was five storeys high, with the library taking up three floors, and the top two floors being leased as office space. The curved wall of the three storeys of the library facing the newly-built Civic Square was made of glass with window seats and desks looking into the square. A colonnade ran along the outside of the building from Victoria Street up a ramp to Civic Square, with its columns designed as metal nikau palms. At the third floor level a two-storey cantilevered portico connected the library to the neighbouring Civic Administration Building. This structure contained offices, meeting rooms and a staff cafeteria. The portico was damaged in the July 2013 Seddon earthquake, and was removed between November 2014 and February 2015.

The library was not damaged in the 2016 Kaikōura earthquake, but Wellington City Council decided to close the building at short notice on 19 March 2019 after receiving reports from engineers that the building had structural issues which meant it might not perform well in the event of a large earthquake. Engineers had specific concerns about the fixings on the precast concrete floors which were of similar design to those in Statistics House, a building which had partially collapsed in the Kaikōura earthquake.

In July 2019 the New Zealand Institute of Architects mounted a campaign to save the library, in response to the mayor's suggestion that it be demolished. In June 2020 Wellington City Councillors voted to repair rather than demolish the building, and announced three possible strengthening options costing between $90 million and $200 million. Public consultation took place in September 2020, when the council put forward five options, including construction of a new building. Public opinion was divided, with some residents saying the services provided were more important than the design of the building, the cost of refurbishment was too high or that the refurbishment would take longer than starting again with a new building. After public consultation closed in October 2020, the Council announced that it would spend $179 million to repair and upgrade the library rather than demolish it. Artist impressions of the proposed redesign of the building, budgeted at $188 million, were released in April 2022.

Athfield Architects have redesigned their 1991 building. The proposed new design for the building will have three additional entrances, including one on Harris Street. In Te Ngākau Civic Square, the steps leading to the former mezzanine floor and café will be replaced by an entrance and café at ground level. Extensions will be added to the top two floors and base isolators will be installed under the building. In December 2022 Wellington City Council announced that the cost of the new building had risen to $200 million, including $6.5 million for 'cultural identity'. As of January 2023, the Central Library building was expected to re-open in 2026.

=== City Gallery ===
City Gallery currently occupies the former Wellington Central Library building, which was built in 1940. The building is made of reinforced concrete in an art deco style. The building's design was the result of an architectural competition. Two designs, by Messenger, Taylor & Wolf from New Plymouth and Gummer & Ford from Auckland, were judged equally good so the two companies worked together on the final design. The building was a T shape, and was designed so that it could be enlarged into a H and possibly have an extra storey added, though this never eventuated. When Wellington Central Library relocated to its new premises in 1991, the library building underwent a major refurbishment so it could meet the needs of a contemporary art gallery. A significant addition built in 2008-2009 added two new galleries for emerging Wellington, Maori and Pacific art, along with a 135-seat auditorium.

=== Jack Ilott Green ===
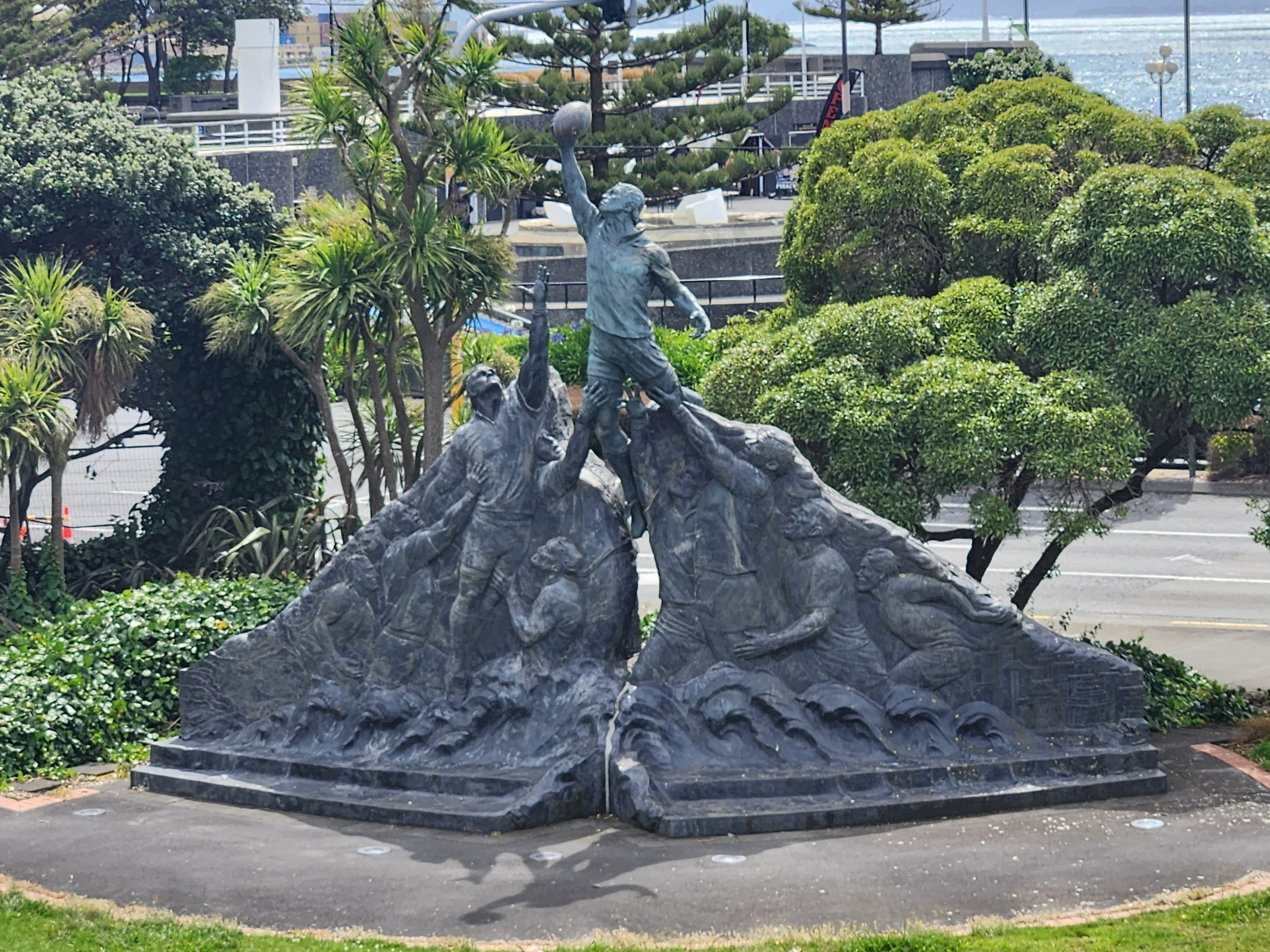
The Rugby World Cup sculpture in 2026

Ilott Building formerly stood on this site at the north-eastern corner of Te Ngākau Civic Square. It was demolished in 1995 and the site was formed into a small park. In 2011, a large Weta Workshop sculpture commemorating that year's Rugby World Cup was installed at the park. Various proposals have been made for new buildings on this site, but there are also those who wish to retain the area as valuable green space in the city.

=== City to Sea Bridge ===
The City to Sea Bridge is a pedestrian bridge and public artwork opened on 31 October 1993 as part of the development of the civic precinct. The wedge-shaped bridge crosses over Jervois Quay, connecting Te Ngākau Civic Square to the Wellington waterfront at Whairepo Lagoon. Architects Rewi Thompson and John Gray were commissioned by Wellington City Council to design the bridge, and they brought in artist Paratene Matchitt to contribute to the design. Problems with the bridge's design and construction have been ongoing. Remedial work was undertaken shortly after the bridge opened when it was found that small children could fall through gaps. Rot was discovered in 2009 and strengthening undertaken in 2010 and 2011. In 2019 an engineering assessment noted that structural problems with the bridge might actually improve its resistance to earthquakes. In November 2023, Wellington City Council announced that as part of its ten-year plan it would cut $170m from its budget for Te Ngākau Civic Square and the City to Sea Bridge, and would look into demolishing the bridge and the Capital E building underneath it.

=== Capital E (formerly Capital Discovery Place) ===
Capital Discovery Place (Te Aho a Maui) was a children's science centre and technology museum built underneath the Civic Square approach to the City to Sea Bridge. The building was designed by Rewi Thompson and Ian Athfield and opened in 1992. The concept was that the centre had a "strong New Zealand focus, with science treated as part of everyday life, and linked closely to arts and culture". In 1997, the organisation changed its name to Capital E. In 2013, the Capital E building in Te Ngākau Civic Square was yellow-stickered after an earthquake assessment triggered by the 2013 Seddon earthquake, and Capital E had to stop operating from the site. The organisation moved to the TSB Sports Arena building on Queen's Wharf.

Views of Te Ngākau Civic Square

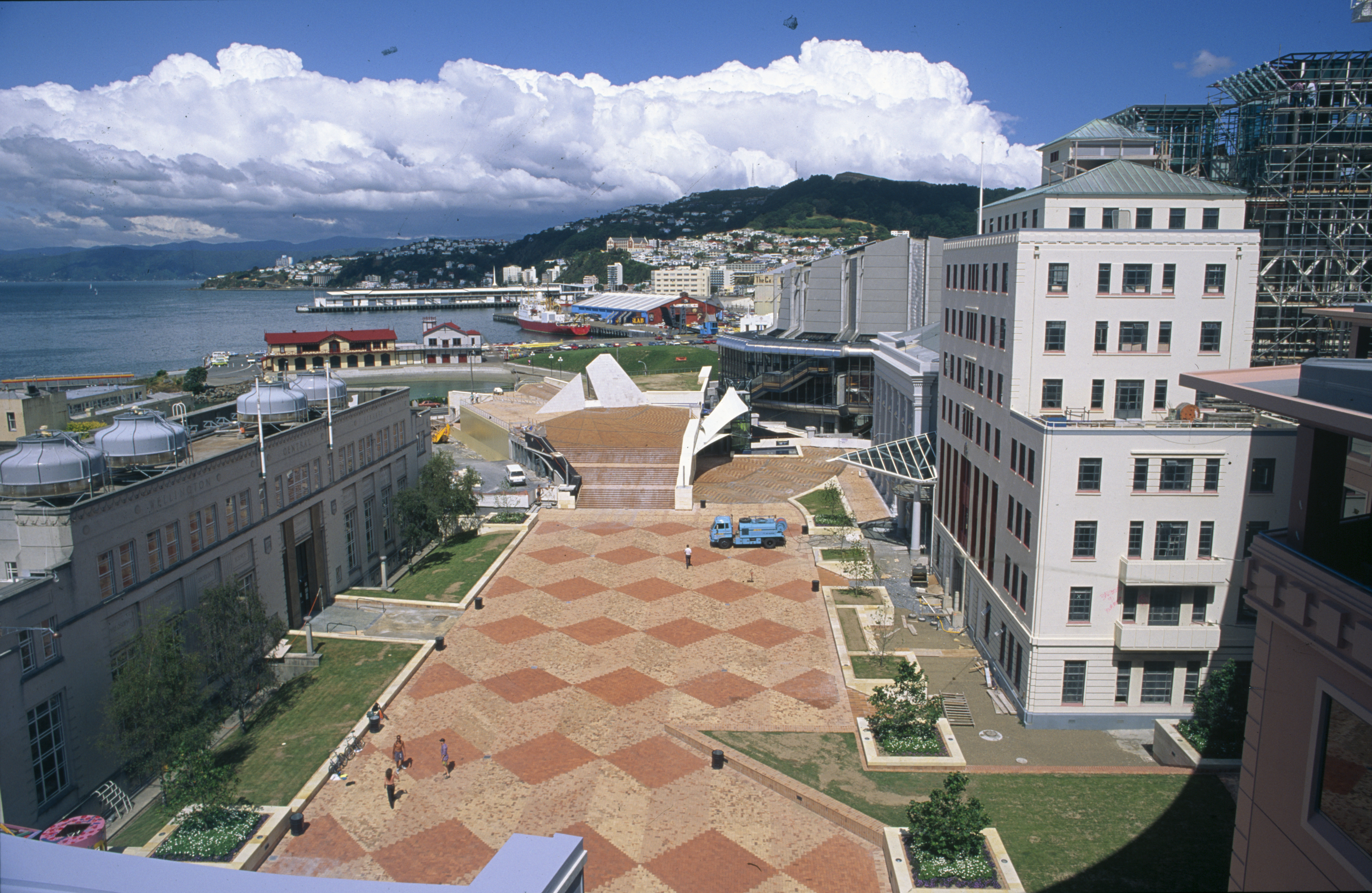
Civic Square nearing completion, 1990. Left to right: City Gallery, City to Sea Bridge, Michael Fowler Centre, Municipal Office Building.

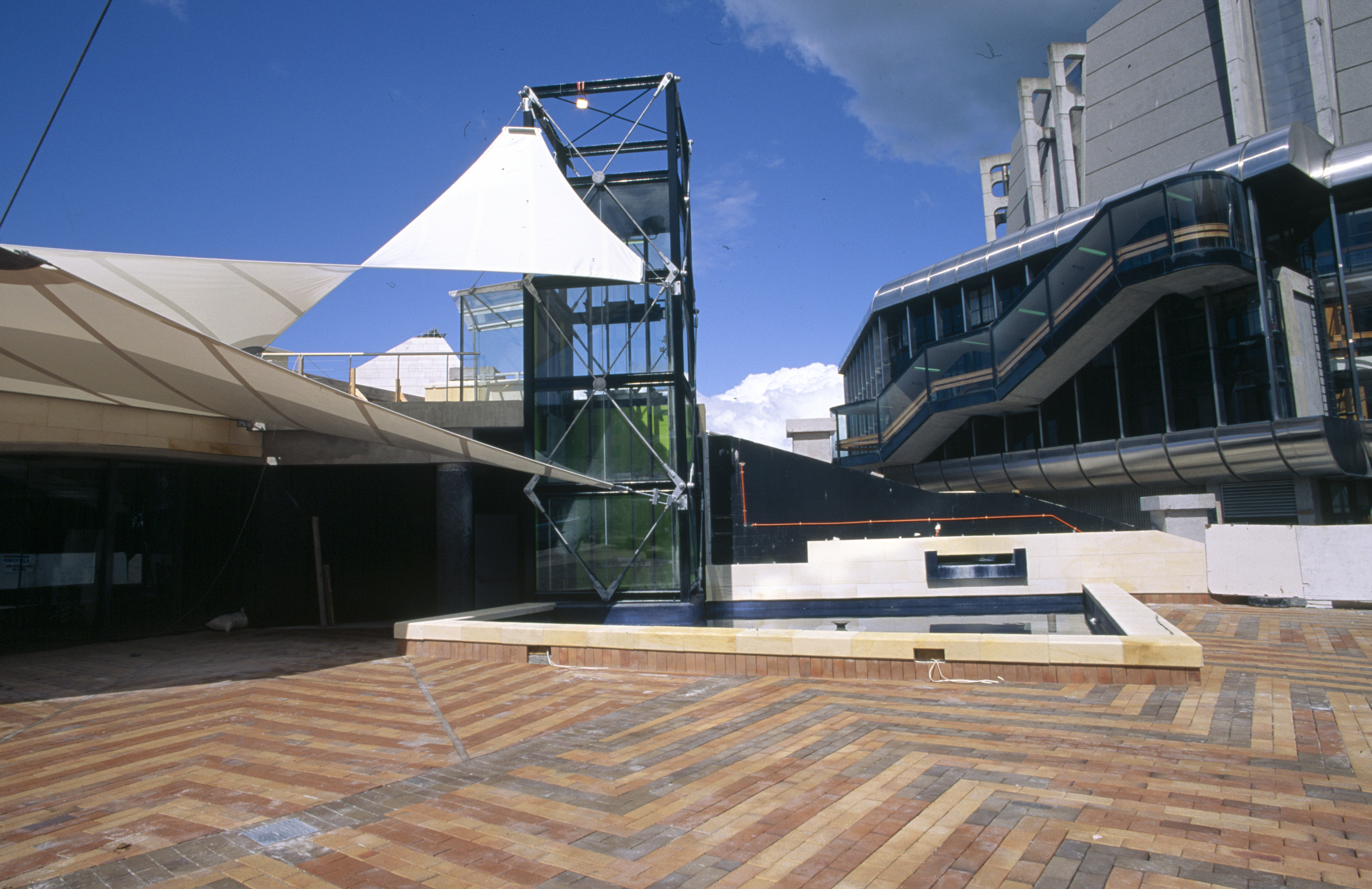
Entrance to Capital E at left, Michael Fowler Centre at right.

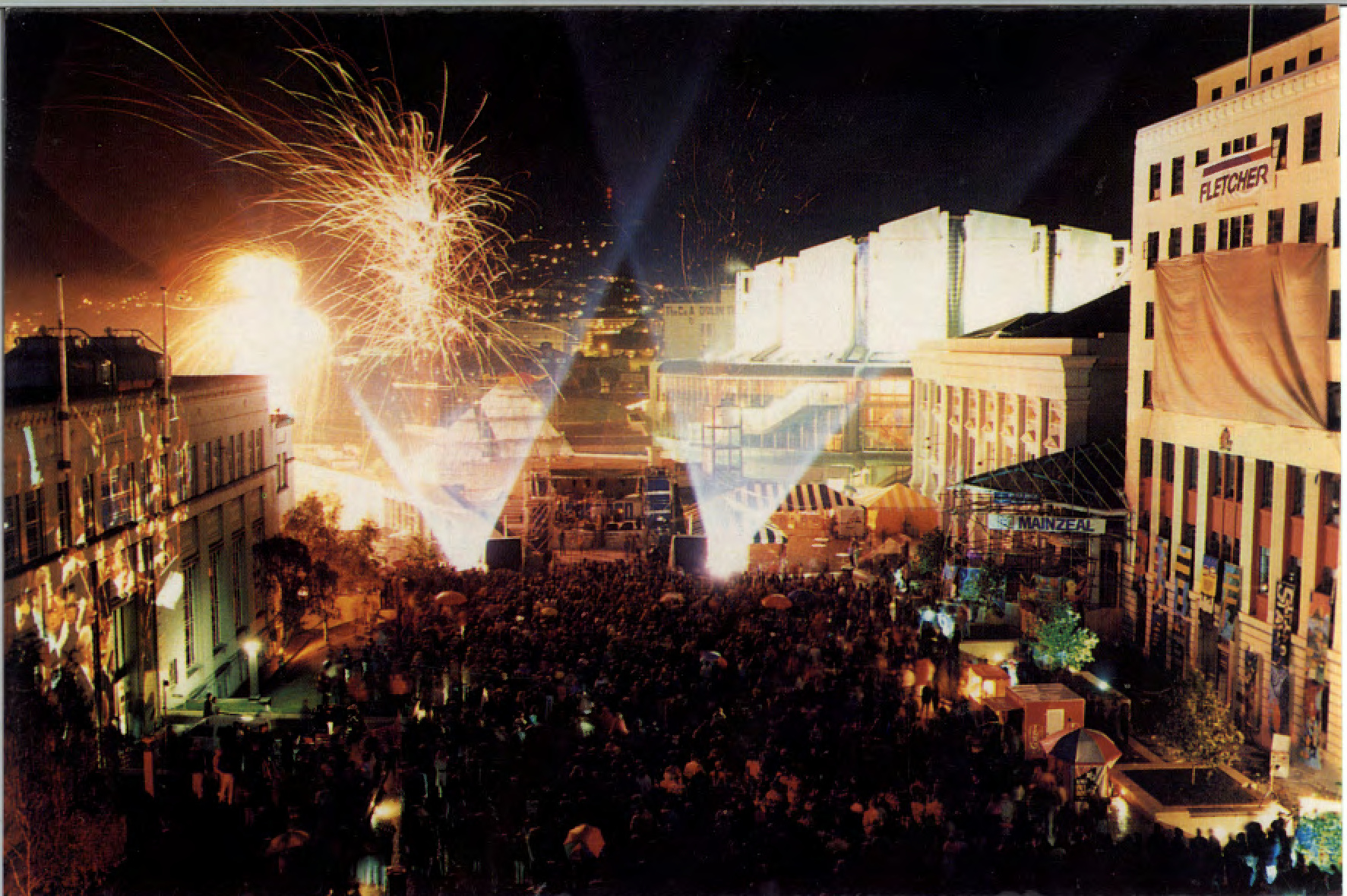
Grand opening of Civic Square, 23 November 1991

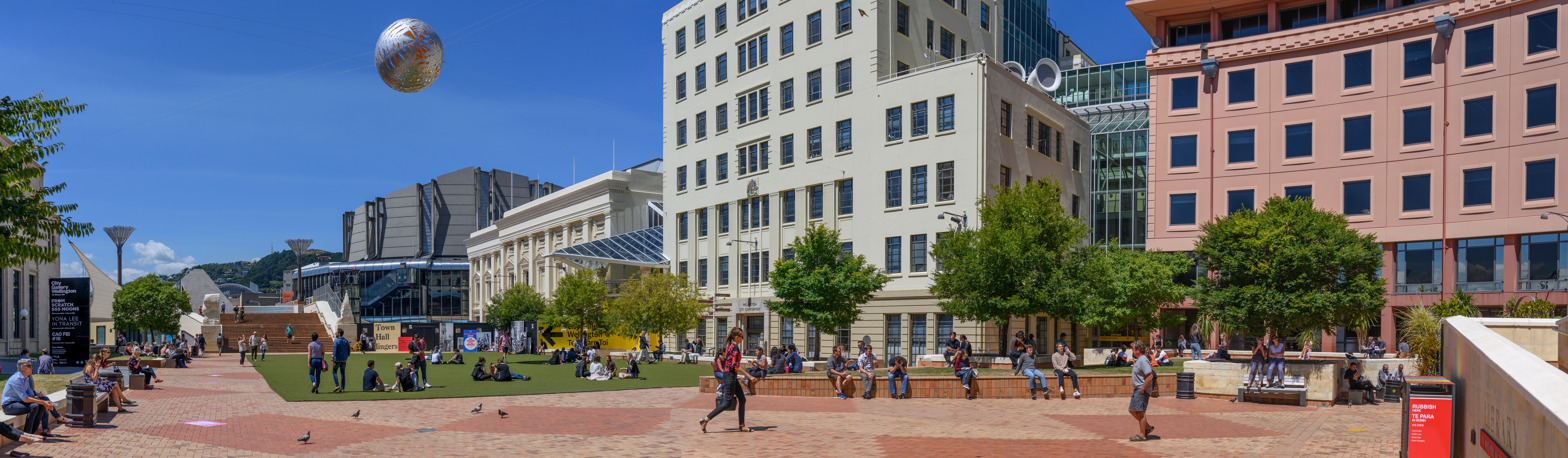
Civic Square in 2019

== See also ==
- Aotea Square, Auckland
- Cathedral Square, Christchurch
- The Octagon, Dunedin
