= Rewi Thompson =

New Zealand architect

Rewi Michael Robert Thompson (Ngāti Porou, Ngāti Raukawa; 19 January 1954 – October 2016) was an influential New Zealand architect who introduced generations of students to Māori design principles as adjunct professor at the University of Auckland’s School of Architecture and Planning.

"While working as an adjunct professor at the School of Architecture at the University of Auckland," writes Jeremy Hansen, "he was at the vanguard of a cultural shift, his studio classes giving a generation of Māori, Pasifika, Pākehā and Tauiwi students the confidence to engage with Māori design principles in their work."

== Early life and education ==
Rewi Thompson was born in Wellington to Bobby, a bus driver, and Mei Thompson. His family had links to Tolaga Bay. Rewi trained as a civil and structural engineer at Wellington Polytechnic, where he gained a New Zealand Certificate of Engineering, and joined the Structon Group as a structural draughtsperson. After he was encouraged to study architecture by architects who worked there he entered architecture school at the University of Auckland in 1977.

"His exceptional talents became immediately apparent to staff and fellow students," wrote Deidre Brown in an obituary in the journal Architecture New Zealand. "David Mitchell, who was one of his earliest design tutors, recalled that one of Rewi’s first student projects was the design of “a bach on an exposed bush-clad site. All the students tried to tone their buildings in with the bush, all except for Rewi. He painted his bright pink and, boy, did it look good. It was a signal about the future.”

Thompson graduated with honours in 1980, and joined Structon’s Auckland office where he became a registered architect. He established his own practice in 1983.

When Thompson graduated there were few Māori architects working in New Zealand. "Rewi was the only Māori at Structon Group, the architecture and engineering firm, when he worked there as a graduate from 1978 to 1982", writes Jade Kake.

Thompson maintained strong connections to his Ngāti Porou and Ngāti Raukawa whānau and marae. "[They] would become formative influences on his conception of architecture as being fundamentally concerned with land and people, and conviction that architecture could return identity and well-being to people suffering from cultural estrangement," said Deidre Brown.

== Career ==
Rewi Thompson was an adjunct professor at Te Pare School of Architecture and Planning at the University of Auckland from 2002 to 2015.

His projects include the terraced Wiri State Housing precinct (1986-1989), canopies at the Ōtara Town Centre (1987), City to Sea Bridge (1990-1994), Puukenga, the School of Māori Studies at Unitec in Auckland (1991), and his own house in Kohimarama (1985). This is a distinctive building, with its front facing ziggurat form based on the Māori poutama (or stairway to heaven) tukutuku pattern.

Thompson believed that architecture could heal the wairua (spirit) of people in difficult circumstances, including inmates at the Ngawha correctional facility in Northland. While advising on this project, he pushed for porches allowing inmates to connect with the landscape. He was an architectural consultant to the Department of Corrections for the Northland Regional Corrections facility project at Ngawha, and the Spring Hill facility near Meremere.

To design the City to Sea Bridge in Wellington, Rewi collaborated with Athfield architects, John Gray and Paratene Matchitt.

Thompson also worked on the Boehringer Ingelheim Office & Warehouse (1989), a number of marae in Auckland such as Ngāti Ōtara, Ruapōtaka, a marae-themed Māori mental health unit at the Mason Clinic, Kaitaia Hospital and Tiahomai at Middlemore.

In 1986 Thompson joined Ian Athfield, John Blair and Roger Walker on a lecture tour of the United States.

Thompson's Fish Canopy was constructed in 1987 by Aronui Trust Carvers at the Whaiora Marae, and installed at Ōtara Town Centre, Auckland.

In 1989 Thompson, Ian Athfield and Frank Gehry collaborated on a competition entry to design the Museum of New Zealand, Te Papa Tongarewa. There has been much debate about why their design didn't make the shortlist.

"[A] relationship with the harbour was what appeared to explicitly inform the Thompson-Athfield-Gehry project which was arranged as a loose assemblage of buildings under a single transparent feather roof. As Athfield put it, the museum would be “…dipping your feet in the harbour, rather than standing back from it,” wrote Matariki Williams. The design, she writes, would have addressed "one of the major criticisms of Te Papa: that it has its back to the harbour."

"Architectural careers are usually measured by the volume and quality of built work. Rewi's completed buildings were never sufficient in number to make him a figure of popular acclaim like Ian Athfield or Roger Walker. Yet he created some remarkable, nationally important structures. His work in designing rehabilitative structures for the incarcerated or the mentally unwell was radical and humane and is still shaping the way these facilities are created today [in New Zealand]," wrote Jeremy Hansen.

== Personal life ==
Rewi Thompson met a teacher, Leona, in 1973, and the couple married in 1981. Leona and Rewi are survived by their daughter.

== Awards and legacy ==
- AAA Monier Tile award (1980) for the Ngāti- Pōneke Marae, "a daring design which took the form of an abstracted waka dragged partly from the harbour and lying on the slopes of Tangi-te-keo, Mount Victoria."
- CHH Award (1989) and an NZIA Branch Award (1990) for the Boehringer Ingelheim Office & Warehouse.
- New Zealand Institute of Architects Award (1995) for Puukenga UNITEC
- UNESCO International Award for a house design for urban Māori.
- New Zealand Institute of Architects award for a children's museum in Hamilton.
- Tasman/Environmental Award for Wishart House, Hokianga Harbour (1999).
- The building of Auckland City Mission’s HomeGround was awarded to a team including Thompson (advising) and Stevens Lawson Architects.
- Thompson was a member of the team that created Future Islands, New Zealand’s exhibition at the 2016 Venice Architecture Biennale.

The Rewi Thompson Undergraduate Scholarship in Architecture was established in 2018 to encourage and support a student of Māori descent undertaking study in Architecture at the University of Auckland. The Scholarship is funded by Architectus, whose founders, Patrick Clifford, Malcolm Bowes and Michael Thomson were friends and working colleagues of Thompson.
