= Paratene Matchitt =

New Zealand sculptor and painter (1933–2021)

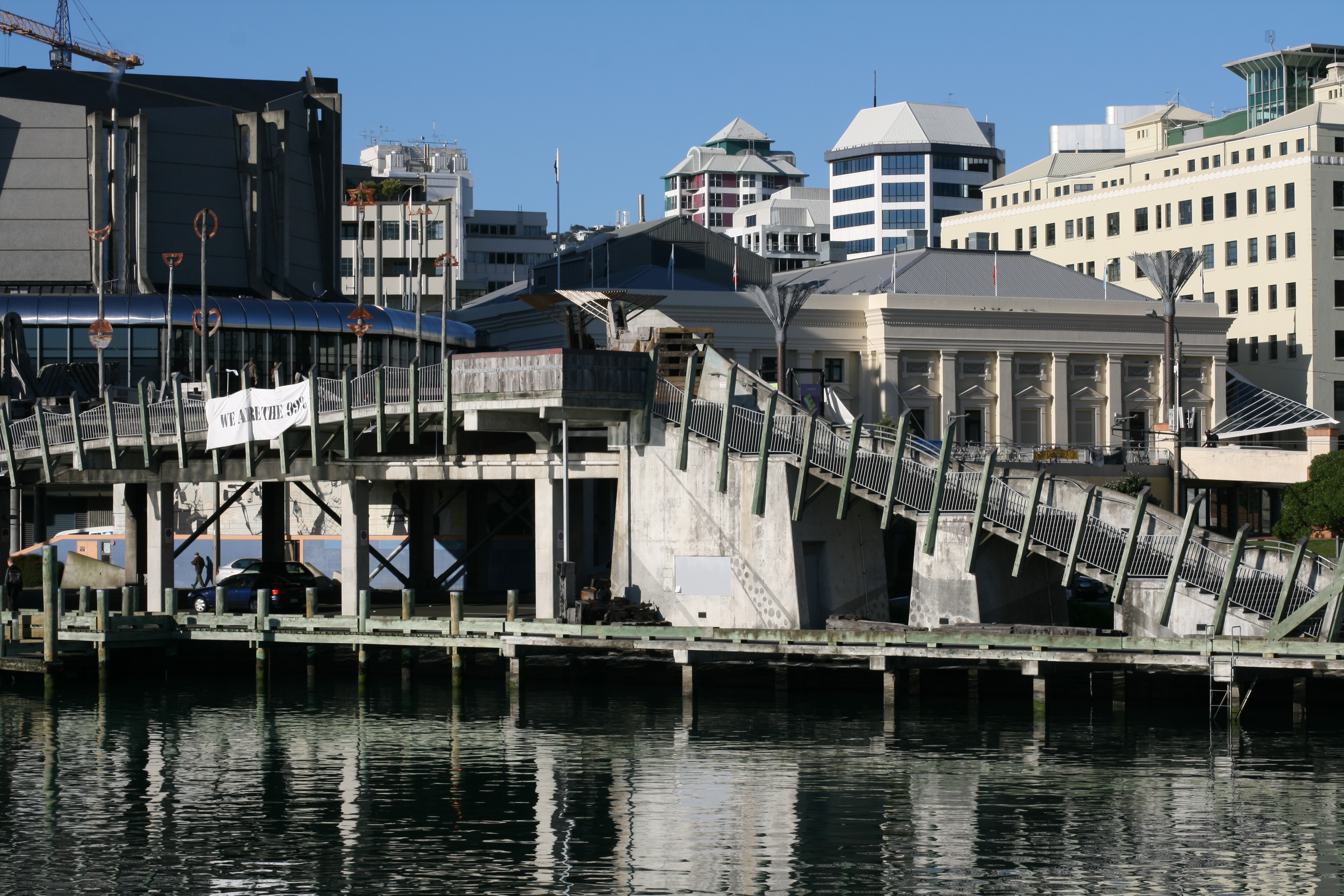
City to Sea Bridge with Michael Fowler Centre (left) and Wellington Town Hall (right) in background

Paratene Temokopuorongo Matchitt (10 August 1933 – 19 July 2021) was a New Zealand sculptor and painter, known for combining traditional Māori art forms with those of modernist art. His work also references events from New Zealand history, particularly the Māori prophetic movements of the nineteenth century and most specifically Te Kooti.

== Early life ==
Matchitt was born in Tokomaru Bay in 1933 of Te Whānau-ā-Apanui, Te Whakatōhea and Ngāti Porou descent. He was educated at St Peter’s Maori Boys' College.

== Artist ==
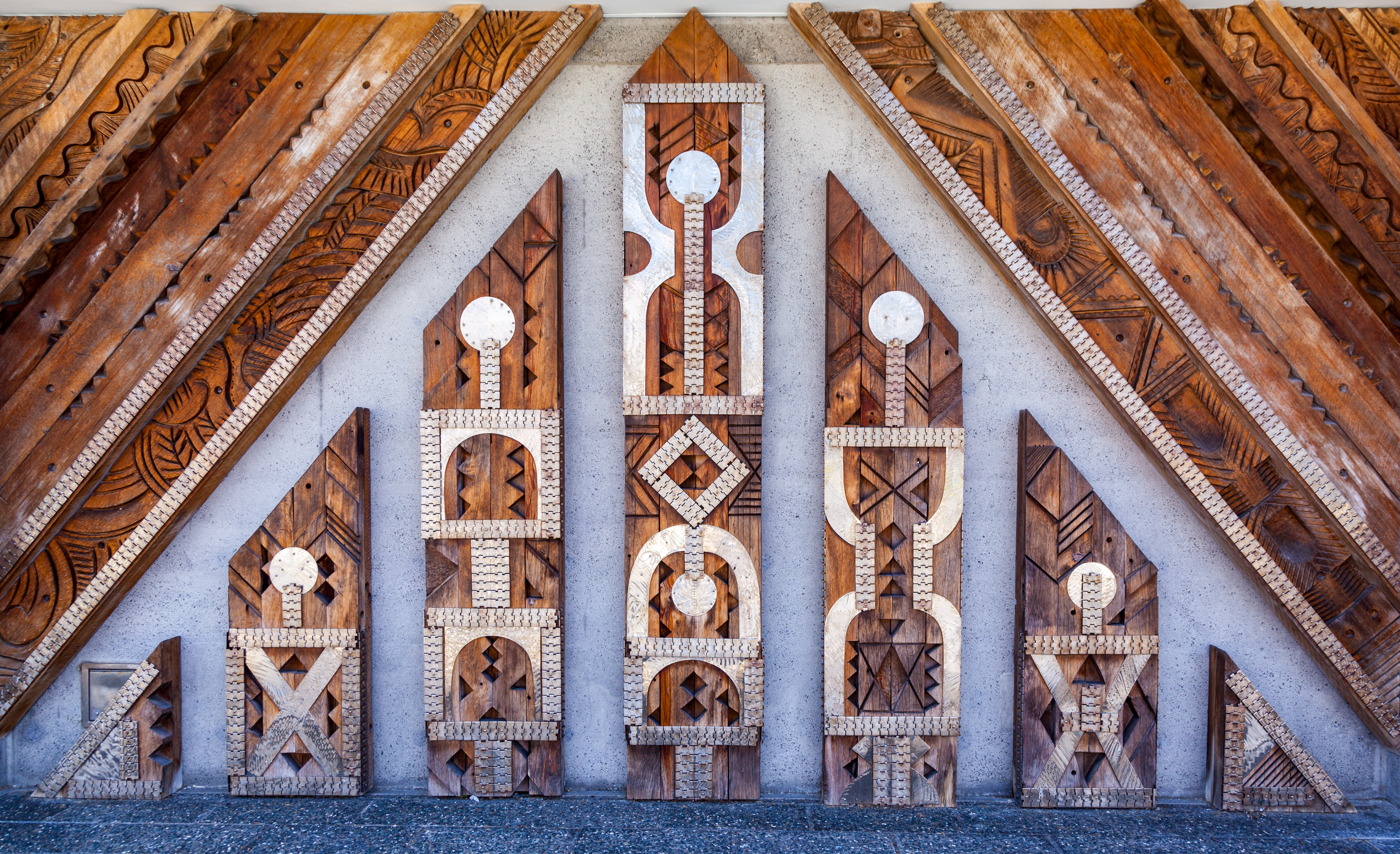
Matchitt's 1990 untitled wood and metal sculpture at the Aotea Centre in Auckland, New Zealand

Matchitt's art formation began with helping his father and grandfather on his workshop at Edgecumbe. He went to the Auckland Teachers' Training College in 1955 and 1956. After graduating as a teacher, he took a Dunedin-based course in teaching arts and crafts in schools at the Dunedin Teachers' Training College. In 1957, he began his career as arts and crafts adviser for the South Auckland Education Board. He was one of the artists who pursued Māori Arts and Crafts courses at Ruatoria with Pine Taiapa. In November 1964, Matchitt was exhibited with other major Māori artists (Clive Arlidge and Fred Graham) in Hamilton. At the time of the Te Pakanga commission (one of his greatest bodies of work) in 1974, Matchitt was an Arts Advisory Officer in South Auckland. Matchitt is best known for his large-scale public sculpture such as the City to Sea Bridge in Wellington (1993) and Auckland’s Aotea Centre (1989).

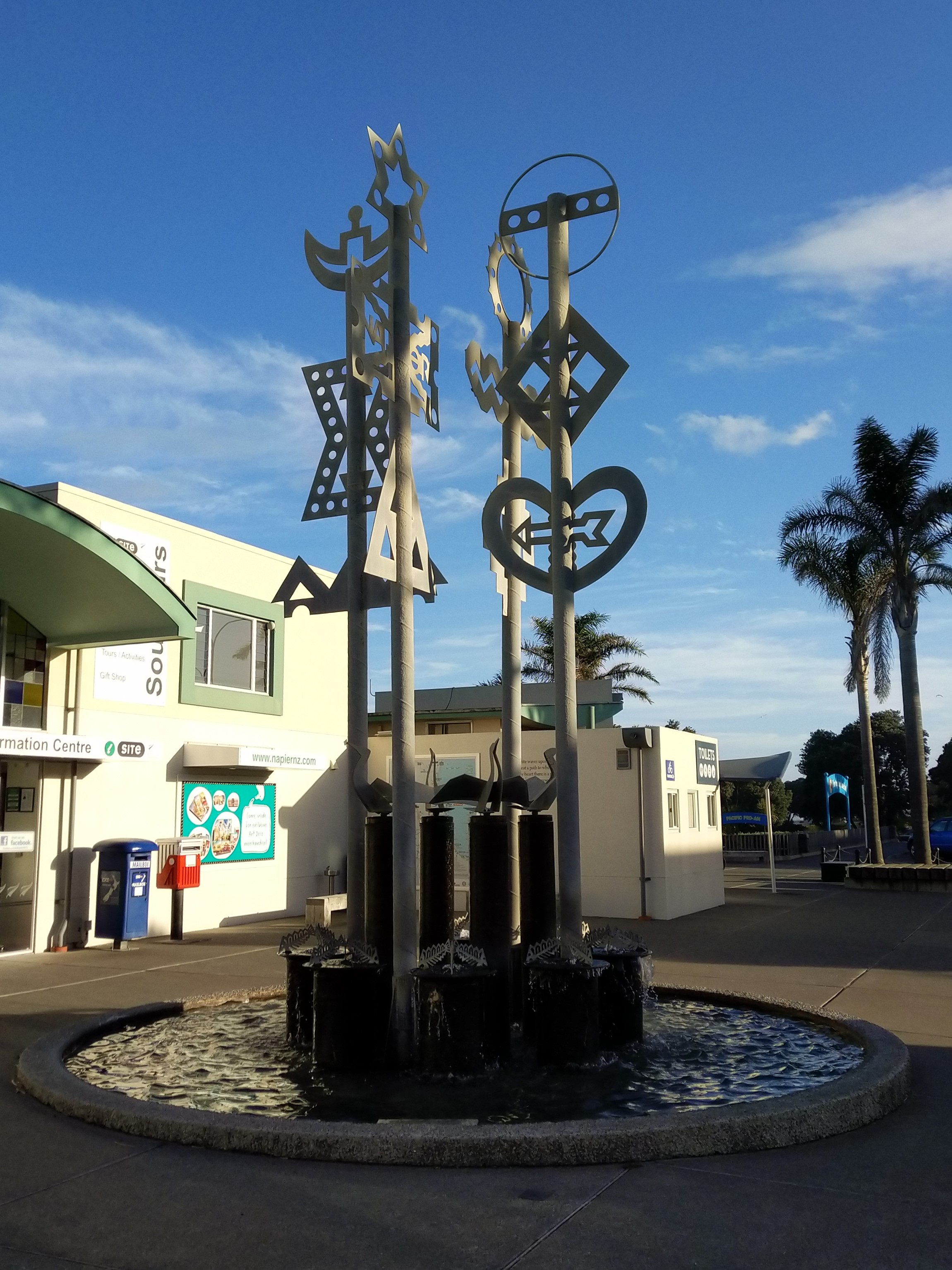
Heritage Fountain, Napier.

Several of Matchitt's works use symbols taken from Te Kooti's flag Te Wepu (The Whip), a large red pennant created by nuns at a Catholic mission which had various symbols on it: a crescent moon, a cross, a mountain, a heart pierced by an arrow, and a six-pointed star. Matchitt used these symbols in several works including the City to Sea Bridge, Aotea Centre, 'Te Wepu Assemblage' (1986), 'Te Wepu' (1986), 'Huakina' (1986) and "Heritage Fountain" ("Nga Puna Wai Whakapapa"), a fountain and metal sculpture in front of Napier Visitor Information Centre.

Matchitt's 'Ringatu III' in Alison Park on Waiheke Island had to be restored at the cost of $8,000 after being hit by taggers.

== Prison & legacy ==
Although Matchitt was a leading figure in contemporary art in New Zealand since the 1960s his work is currently not celebrated due to his criminal conviction. Matchitt was jailed for two and a half years in 2001, convicted of sexually abusing a 16-year-old girl. In 2006 the High Court at Napier threw out charges against Matchitt of drugging and date-raping a 29-year-old woman, citing no evidence that the woman had either been drugged or raped.

Matchitt's biography influences curators and writers in their consideration of promoting and including his work, for example a survey exhibition was put aside after his conviction.

== Death ==
Matchitt died on 19 July 2021, aged 88.
