= Wellington Town Hall =

Concert hall in Wellington, New Zealand

- Te Whare Whakarauika (Māori)
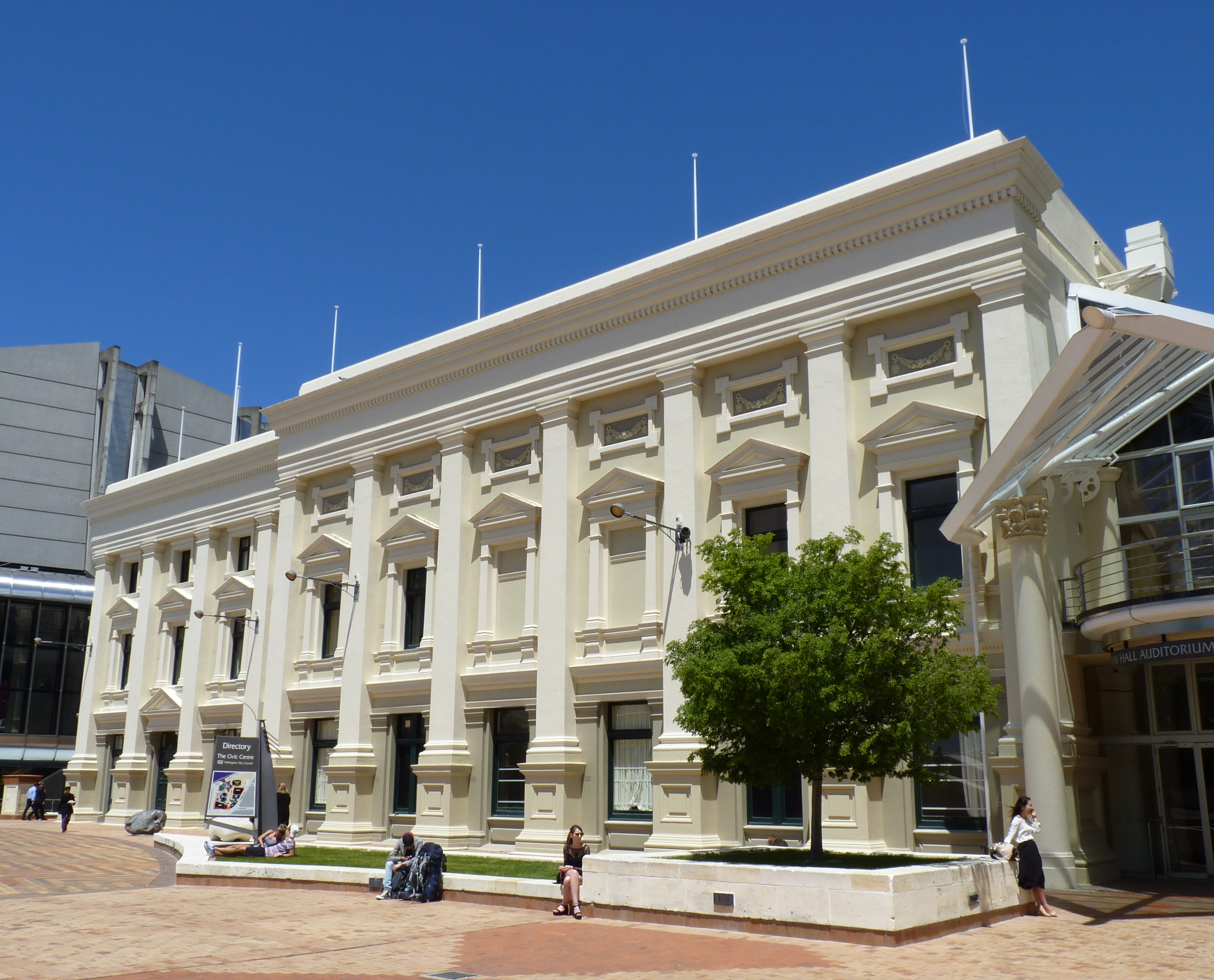
- The Town Hall from Civic Square

General information
- Type: Town hall, concert hall
- Architectural style: Neo-Renaissance
- Location: Corner of Wakefield Street and Civic Square, Wellington
- Coordinates: 41°17′21″S 174°46′38″E
- Current tenants: Wellington City Council
- Construction started: 1901
- Completed: 1904
- Owner: Wellington City

Design and construction
- Architect: Joshua Charlesworth
- Main contractor: Paterson, Martin and Hunter

Heritage New Zealand – Category 1
- Designated: 11 December 2003
- Reference no.: 3275

The Wellington Town Hall (Māori: Te Whare Whakarauika) is a concert hall and part of the municipal complex in Wellington, New Zealand, which opened in December 1904. It has been closed to the public since the 2013 Seddon earthquake for extensive strengthening work, and is projected to reopen in 2027.

== History ==
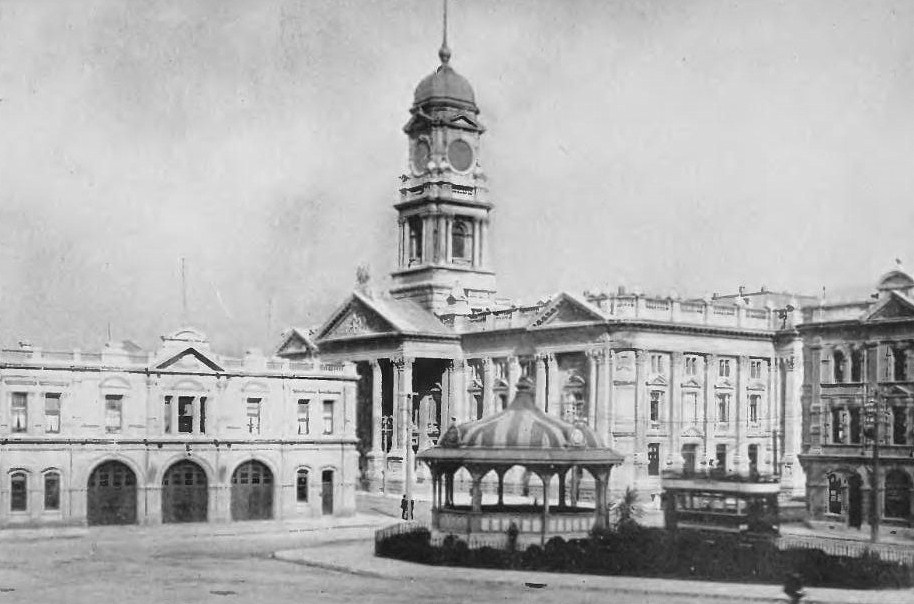
The Town Hall in 1913 (centre back). Visible is the clock tower which was removed in 1934.

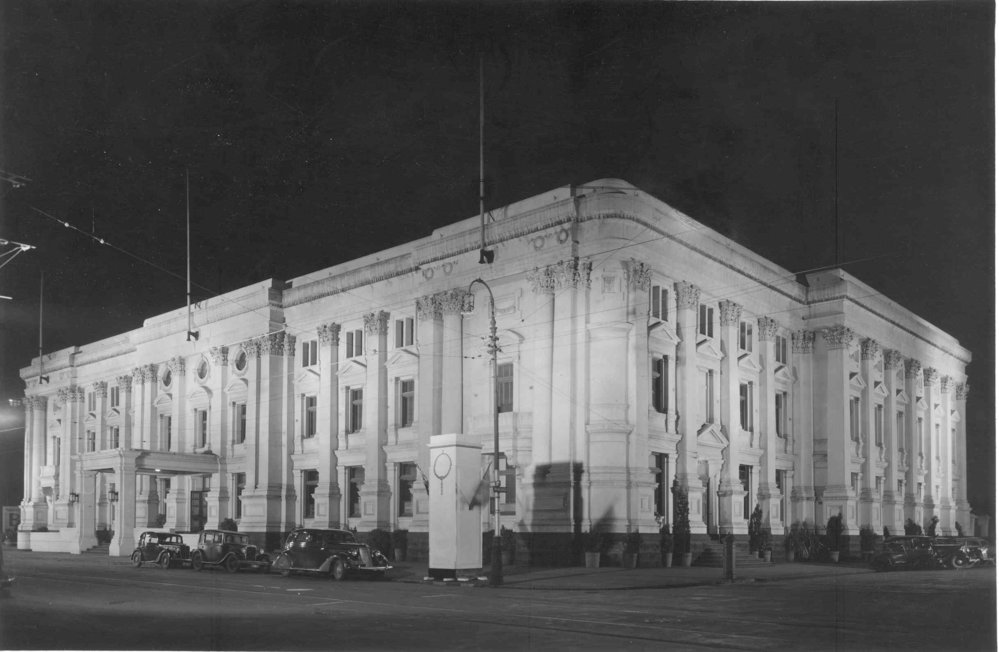
Wellington Town Hall at night in 1937

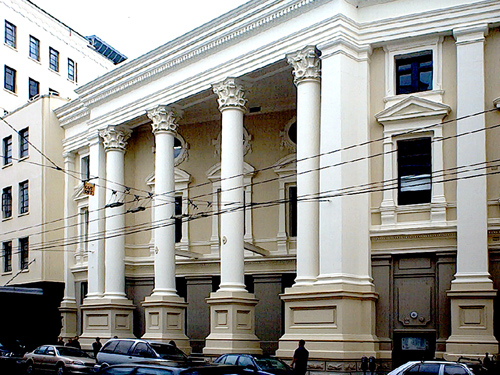
The Town Hall from Wakefield Street

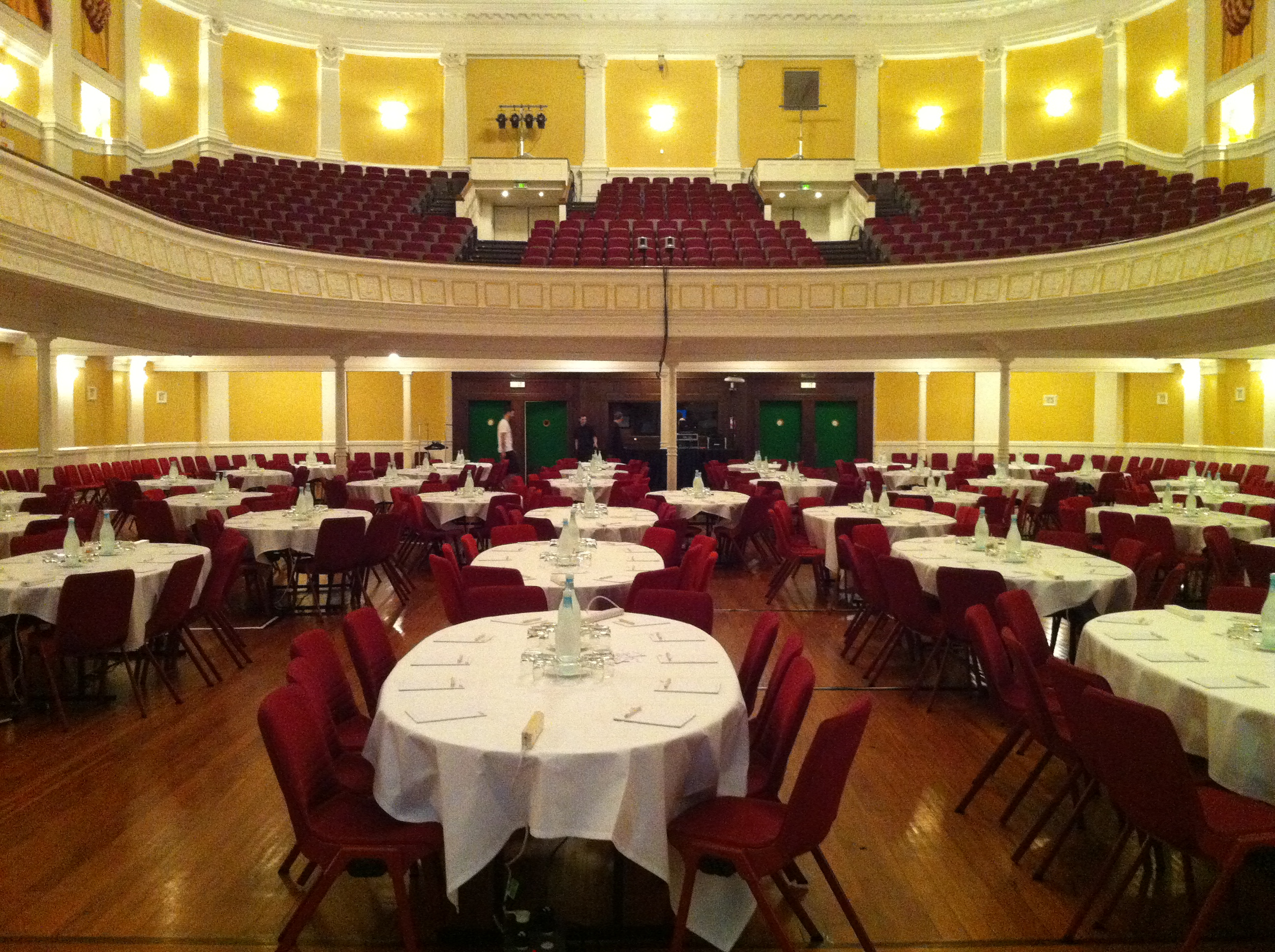
The interior of the Town Hall

The foundation stone for the building was laid in 1901 by the Duke of Cornwall and York (later George V). The organist and choirmaster Maughan Barnett composed an Ode for the occasion. Construction began the following year. It was officially opened on 7 December 1904.

The Town Hall was originally fronted on the Cuba Street side with a Roman-styled portico and a 150-foot clock tower. A clock was not installed in the tower until 1922, when John Blundell, owner of The Evening Post newspaper, donated one. In 1934 the tower was removed as a precaution following the 1931 Hawke's Bay earthquake, and the main portico, pediment, balustrade, parapet and bold cornice were also removed. The building was earthquake strengthened in 1943 following an earthquake the previous year. During the strengthening the Corinthian capitals on the exterior were replaced with Tuscan detailing.

The Town Hall may have been a low maintenance priority of councils over the years. By 1973 during a concert (Kenny Rogers and The First Edition) their sound levels caused dust to begin to drift down over the stage. When their music hit a crescendo during the chorus of one piece (may have been Something's Burning), the stage ceiling collapsed on them, dropping pigeon bodies, empty and dead eggs, nesting material and plaster rubble and dust all over the stage and the band's equipment. The concert did continue, with black-dressed stage hands creeping around the stage sweeping up detritus, removing carcasses, and dusting the amplifiers, speaker cases, keyboards, and anything else covered with plaster dust.

In 1980 the Michael Fowler Centre was built immediately in front of the Town Hall's main entrance in anticipation of the older building's demolition. However the New Zealand Historic Places Trust (since renamed to Heritage New Zealand) persuaded the City Council to retain the Town Hall, and it was registered as a Category 1 Historic Place in 2003.

In 1989 plans were unveiled to create Civic Square between the town hall and the old city library. As part of this, the Town Hall underwent full refurbishment in 1991–1992. During this process the concert chamber was demolished and replaced with reception rooms. Although the council offices have spread beyond the Town Hall since 1904, the building still housed the offices of the Mayor and Wellington City Council members until it was closed for earthquake strengthening.

== Auditorium ==
The main auditorium has been rated one of the best in the world for acoustic quality. It has hosted numerous live performances (including The Beatles & The Rolling Stones) as well as fashion shows, debutante balls, political rallies, degree conferrals and at least one episcopal ordination, that of Cardinal John Dew in 1995. Recording engineers from Abbey Road Studios, after recording the NZSO in 2012 for the soundtrack of The Hobbit films, described the Town Hall as "one of the best acoustic spaces" they had ever encountered. Wellington-based film makers Peter Jackson and Fran Walsh have donated $2 million towards a new state-of-the-art recording facility to be built in the Town Hall, as part of the planned National Music Centre to open in 2026 and incorporate the New Zealand School of Music and the NZSO.

The main auditorium has one of the world's few remaining Edwardian era pipe organs. It was manufactured in England by Norman and Beard and shipped in pieces to Wellington in October and November 1905. After months spent installing the organ in the main auditorium, it was opened on 6 March 1906. The organ has 4000 pipes and four keyboards. The pipes are made variously of pure tin, a mix of lead, tin and aluminium, or zinc. The organ is known for its beautiful sound and was played regularly until being dismantled in 2013 in preparation for earthquake-strengthening work on the Town Hall. The organ was sent to the South Island Organ Company for restoration, and will be reinstalled when the earthquake strengthening work is complete.

=== Earthquake strengthening ===
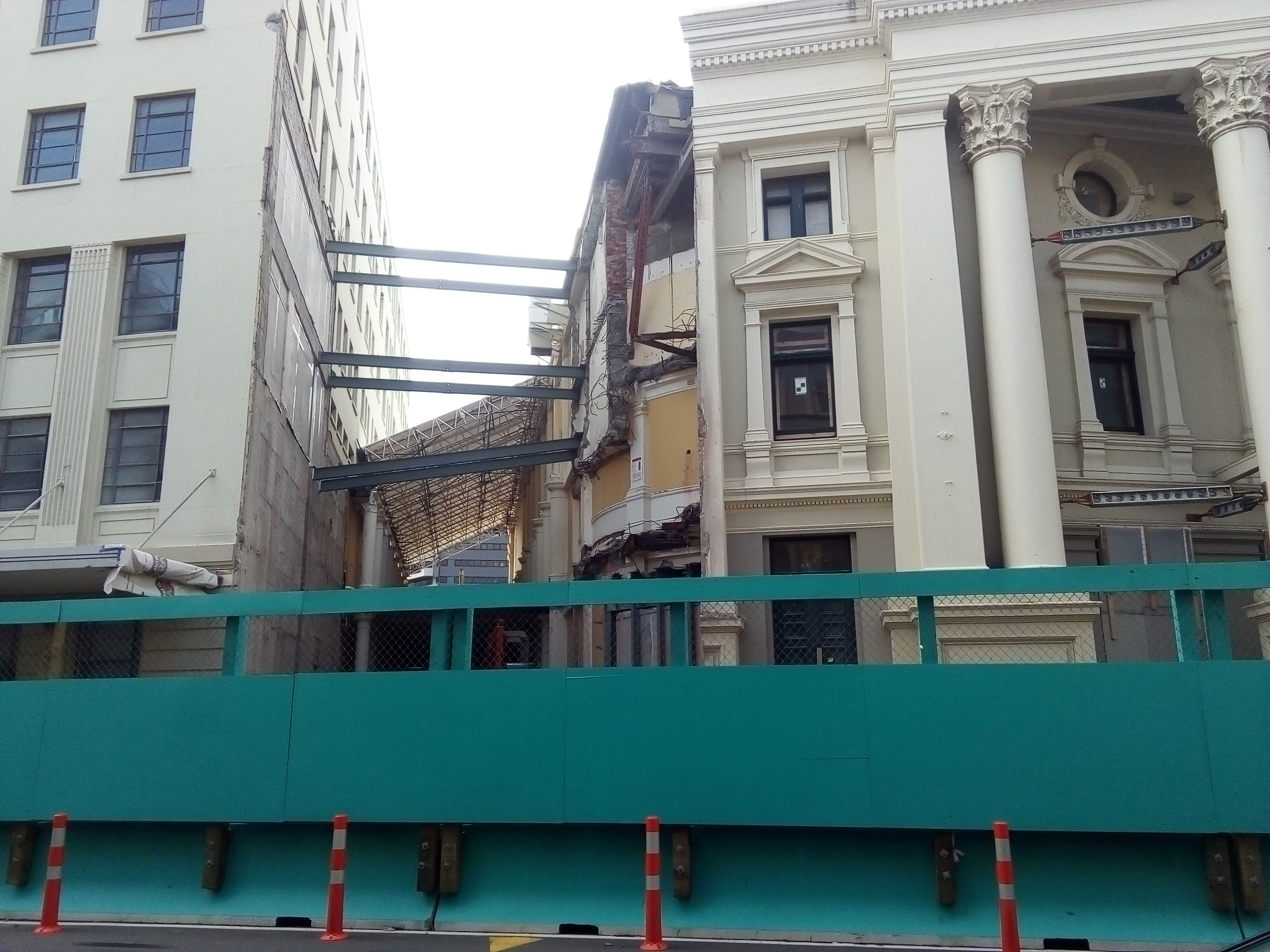
Wellington Town Hall renovation in 2020

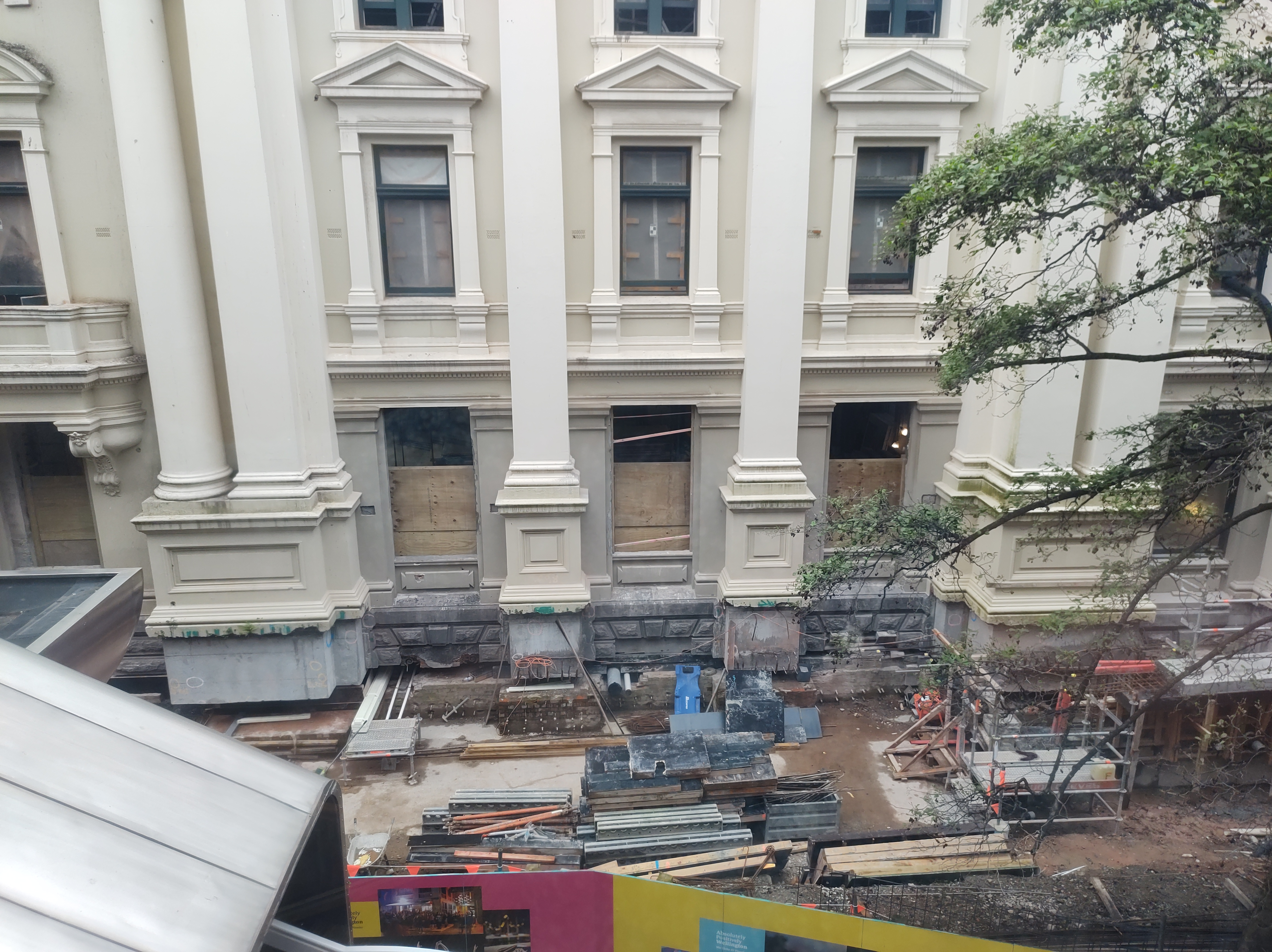
Base isolation works in 2023

In 2014, quake strengthening was put on hold by Wellington City Council after cost projections increased from $43 million to $60 million due to unforeseen technical issues. In March 2017 Wellington City Council announced its intention to bring the Town Hall up to 100% of the New Zealand building regulations at a cost of $85 million, with construction to begin in 2018 and an aim to re-open in 2021. As restoration work began, further complexities were uncovered, and increasing costs meant that in February 2019 the council extended the budget to $112 million, with an undisclosed amount of additional contingency. The extra work required included seismic base isolation to better secure the long term future of the building, while delaying the opening by a further two years. In May 2022 the council announced the opening was further delayed to January 2025, with an increased estimated cost of $182 million. In 2023, the council agreed to a cost increase to $329 million, due to the poor condition and excessive waterlogging of the reclaimed land under the building. This has also affected the adjacent Michael Fowler Centre, which is due to be earthquake strengthened before 2030.

== Sources ==
- "Wellington Town Hall". New Zealand Heritage List/Rārangi Kōrero. Heritage New Zealand.
- Venueweb – CAD files of theatrical and performance venues – Wellington Town Hall
- Town Hall Strengthening. Retrieved June 2017
- About the Project. Retrieved June 2017
- Town Hall Architectural History. Retrieved June 2017
- Town Hall Fact Sheet. Retrieved June 2017
