= Michael Fowler Centre =

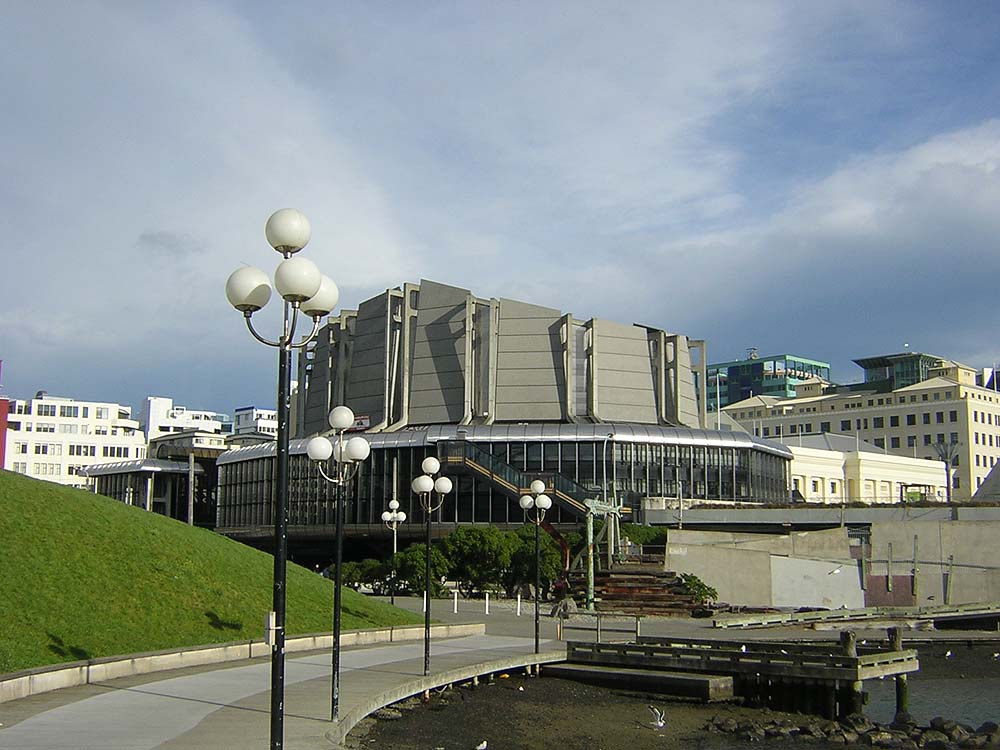
- The Michael Fowler Centre viewed from Whairepo Lagoon
- Interactive map of the Michael Fowler Centre area

General information
- Type: Concert hall and convention centre
- Location: Wellington, 111 Wakefield Street, Te Aro, Wellington
- Coordinates: 41.289421°S 174.778053°E
- Construction started: 1980
- Completed: 1983

Technical details
- Floor count: 3

Design and construction
- Architect: Warren and Mahoney
- Other designers: Acoustic assistance from A. Harold Marshall

Other information
- Seating capacity: Seats up to 2,209 for concerts and has a classroom capacity for 1,035 persons

Website
- https://www.wellingtonnz.com/venues-wellington/our-venues/michael-fowler-centre

The Michael Fowler Centre is a concert hall and convention centre in Wellington, New Zealand. It was constructed on reclaimed land next to Civic Square, and is the pre-eminent concert site in central Wellington. The building was designed by architects Warren and Mahoney, and is named after Sir Michael Fowler, who was mayor of Wellington at the time and the primary promoter of its construction.

== History ==
The building was initially commissioned in 1975 as the New Town Hall, with the original intention being to demolish the Wellington Town Hall. It was designed by architects Miles Warren and Maurice Mahoney of Warren and Mahoney, with acoustic assistance from University of Auckland researcher A. Harold Marshall.

It is named after the primary promoter of its construction, Sir Michael Fowler, at the time the mayor of Wellington. Fowler desired a building that would remove Wellington from the "doldrums" and outdo the Christchurch Town Hall, also designed by Warren and Mahoney. The initial cost was stated as $6.8 million. Despite criticism, Fowler used municipal funds to develop an fundraising campaign termed "Operation Waterloo", involving "regiments" of different types of volunteers. Attempted sources of money included a municipal lottery and donors such as Nelson Rockefeller and Adnan Khashoggi, but Fowler eventually had to take out a government loan. Foundations were laid in 1979, but work was complicated by the site being on reclaimed land, and construction only began in 1982.

After delays, the building was opened in September 1983 by the Duke of Wellington, with the final cost being $17.5 million. The Dominion praised it as a "glittering glass and steel-framed testament" with the "startling immediacy of a piece of legerdemain", but an opposing councillor described it as the "Squashed Top Hat" and "Jaws II".

The site abuts Te Ngākau Civic Square, opened in 1991. It received an Enduring Architecture award from the New Zealand Institute of Architects in 2010. In 2023 the building was marked as earthquake prone; the following year, three scenarios were proposed, including demolition and remediation.

== Design and artwork ==
The exterior of the building is constructed of multiple materials, including stainless steel cladding, concrete panelling, and a raised glass circulation passage. The main auditorium uses wooden reflectors. It seats 2210 people during a concert, and 1035 during a classroom type event.

The interior contains abstract tapestries suspended from the roof, designed by textile artist Gordon Crook. These were commissioned under the theme of "definitely Wellington" but much of the final artwork was "transformed into abstractions" during the design process. Due to UV damage, the banners were replaced by replicas in 1999.

=== Exterior lighting ===
The exterior of the Michael Fowler Centre contains a lighting system which allows light to be reflected off the concrete panels of the building. These lights have been used to mark significant occasions such as local LGBT Pride events, 125 years of women's suffrage in New Zealand, the birth of the then-Prince George of Cambridge in 2013, or in memory of the victims of the November 2015 Paris attacks.

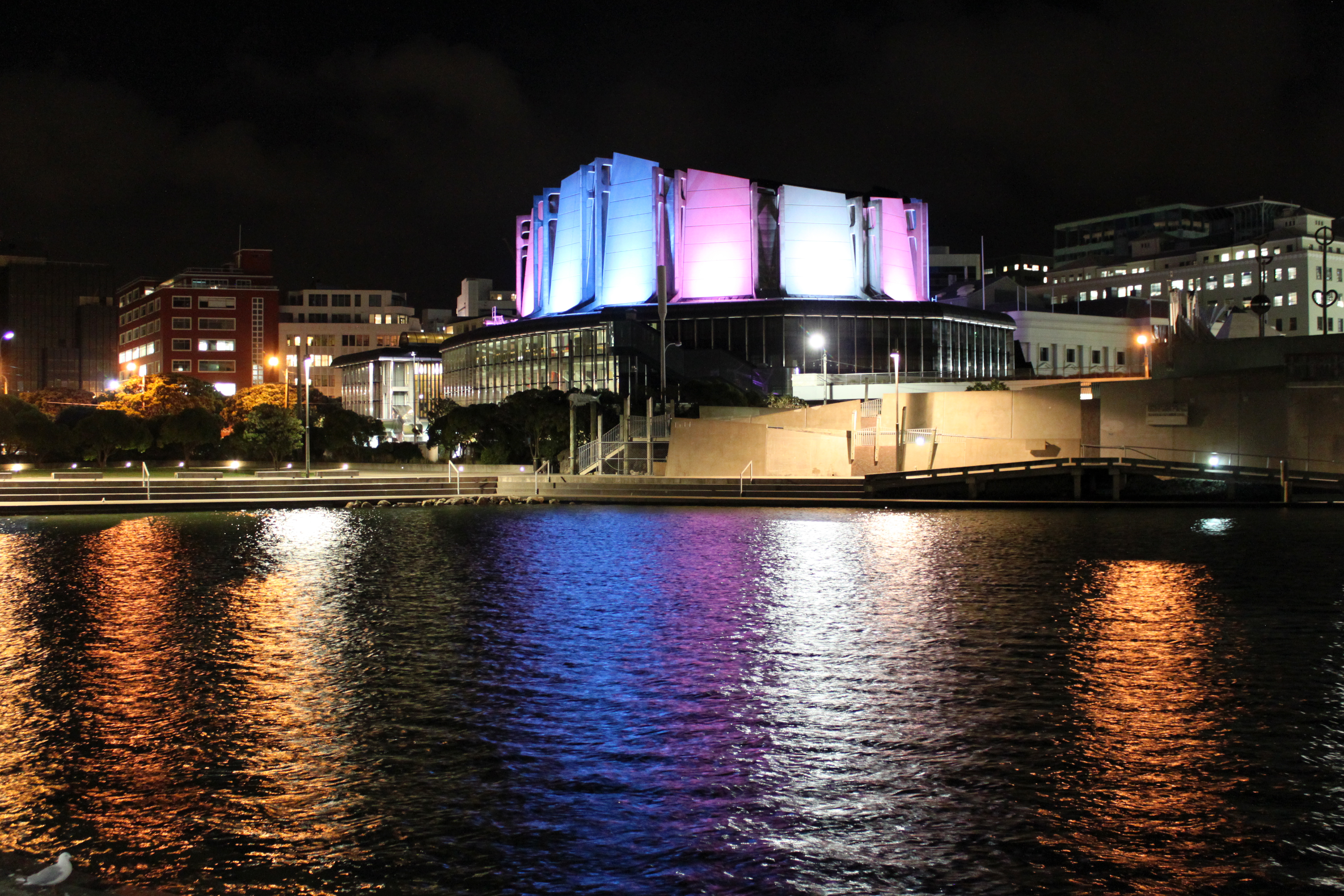
Michael Fowler Centre lit in the colours of the transgender flag on 21 March 2018 in remembrance of Zena Campbell

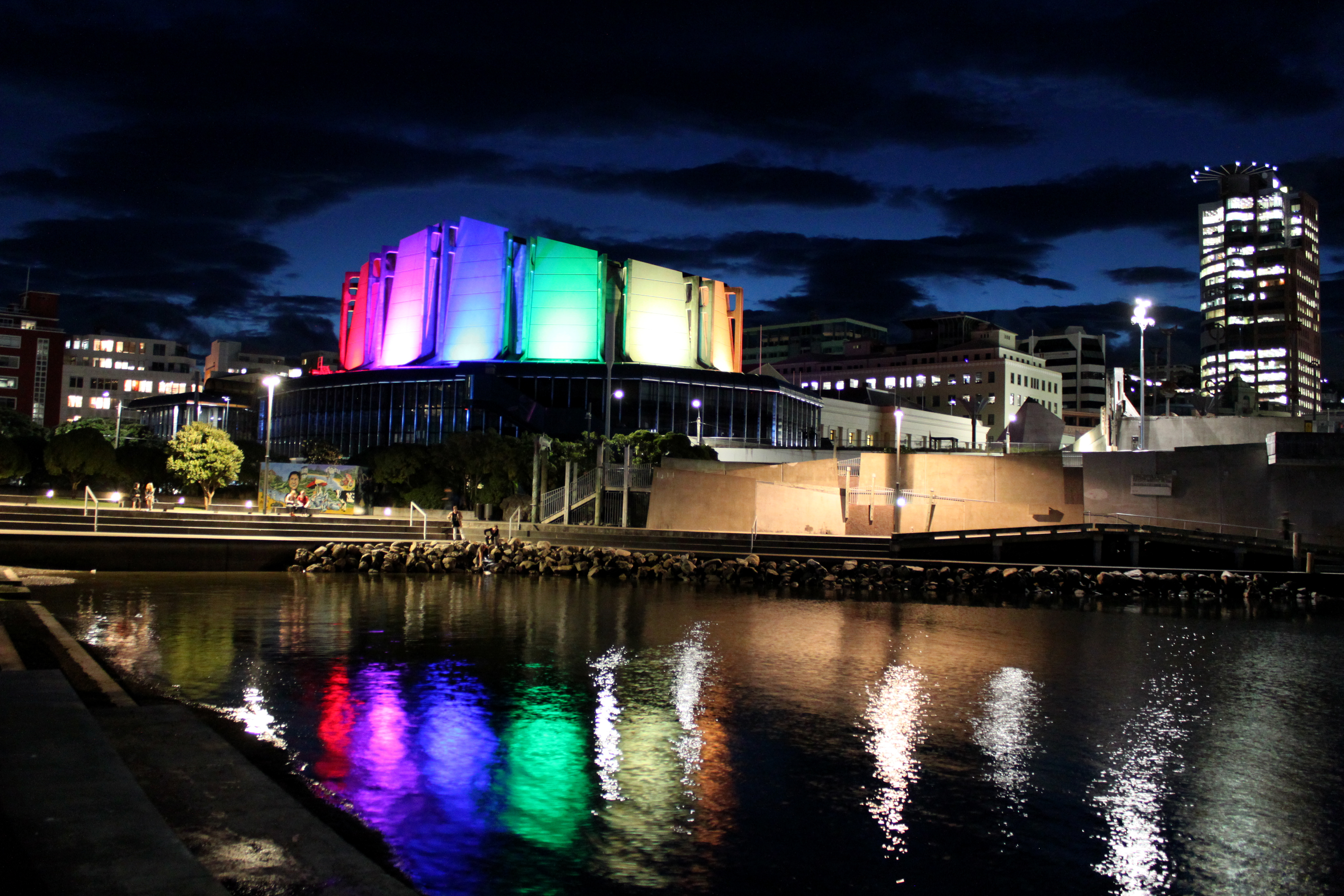
Michael Fowler Centre lit in the colours of the rainbow flag in March 2019

== Events and performances ==
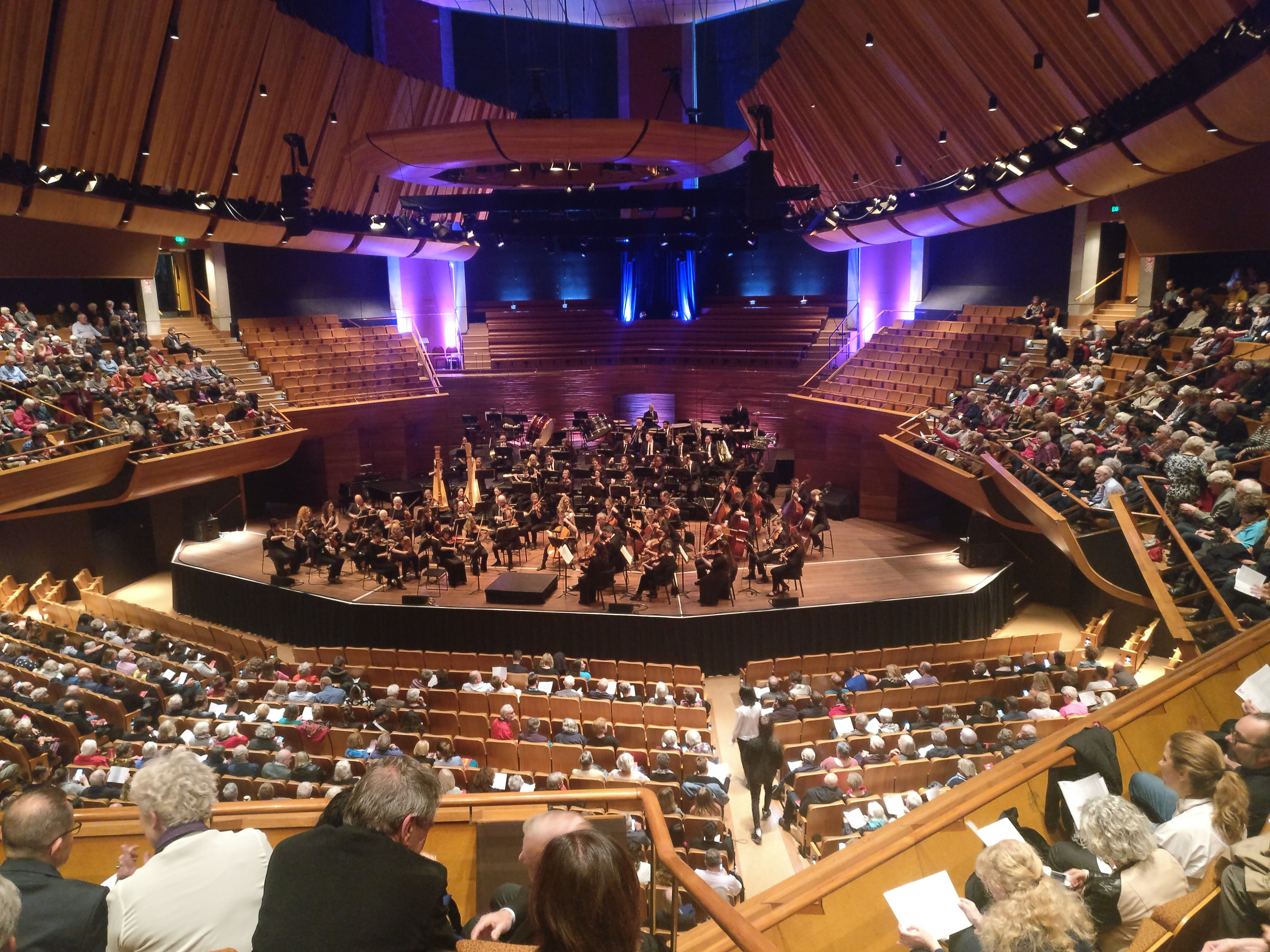
Orchestra Wellington in the main auditorium

The centre is used by international and local acts, conferences, and summits; it is also the home of the New Zealand Symphony Orchestra, and Orchestra Wellington.

The venue is now part of the Venues Wellington group of venues, managed by the Wellington Regional Economic Development Agency.
