= Photography in New Zealand =

New Zealand photography first emerged in the mid-nineteenth century with the arrival of European settlers, and over time has become an important part of modern New Zealand art. Early photographic collections, now primarily housed in national galleries, contain some of the only images of Aotearoa before destructive ecological events, such as the eruption of Mount Tarawera or British colonial efforts. Photography played an important role in recording colonial projects, British-Māori wars, and the impact of World War I on New Zealand culture, society, and economy. While it has previously been hidden within the historical record, historians today have unveiled the important role Māori and women photographers played in Aotearoa's photographic history.

== Early photography ==
Photography arrived in New Zealand when British settlers brought daguerrotypy to the island during the mid-19th century. While the photograph itself failed, the first daguerreotype was taken by the British Lieutenant Governor Edward Eyre in 1848; Eyre also happened to practice photography as a hobby. The earliest surviving photograph is a daguerreotype taken by Lawson Insley in 1852. The first photographic styles consisted of portraiture, cartes de visite, landscapes, wedding or group photos, and topographical images used in postcards. Settlers also used new camera technology to document the colonial project, photographing the New Zealand Wars, coal mining gullies, the Otago gold rush, and taking ethnographic portraits of Māori (sometimes consensual, sometimes forced). Studios (especially for portraiture, complete with outfits, props, and backgrounds) as well as photographic societies began to pop up all over Auckland, Wellington, Christchurch, Dunedin, and more. While portraiture remained common, another photographic style rose in popularity near the close of the 19th century: postcards. Scenic postcard production in Aotearoa exploded in popularity at the turn of the century, peaking at over fourteen million cards posted in New Zealand in 1909. Scenic, topographical, and landscape-centric photography often served to support European tourism; the New Zealand Tourist Department explicitly gave permission to independent photographers to sell national postcards. Around this time in 1901, the newly created New Zealand Department of Tourist and Health Resorts began employing photographers.

New Zealand fighters in World War I brought their Kodaks to the battlefront and documented important scenes of the Gallipoli campaign. Studio portraits of soldiers were taken before heading off to battle as a means of preserving their likeness for friends and family. Medical photographs recorded casualties, injuries, amputations, and other further disfigurations from the war for the benefit of medical students and professionals. Press photography from the Great War played a role in the creation of a New Zealand nationhood; rallying for war united soldiers and citizens within a shared sense of identity and patriotism.

Early photographers and notable photographs

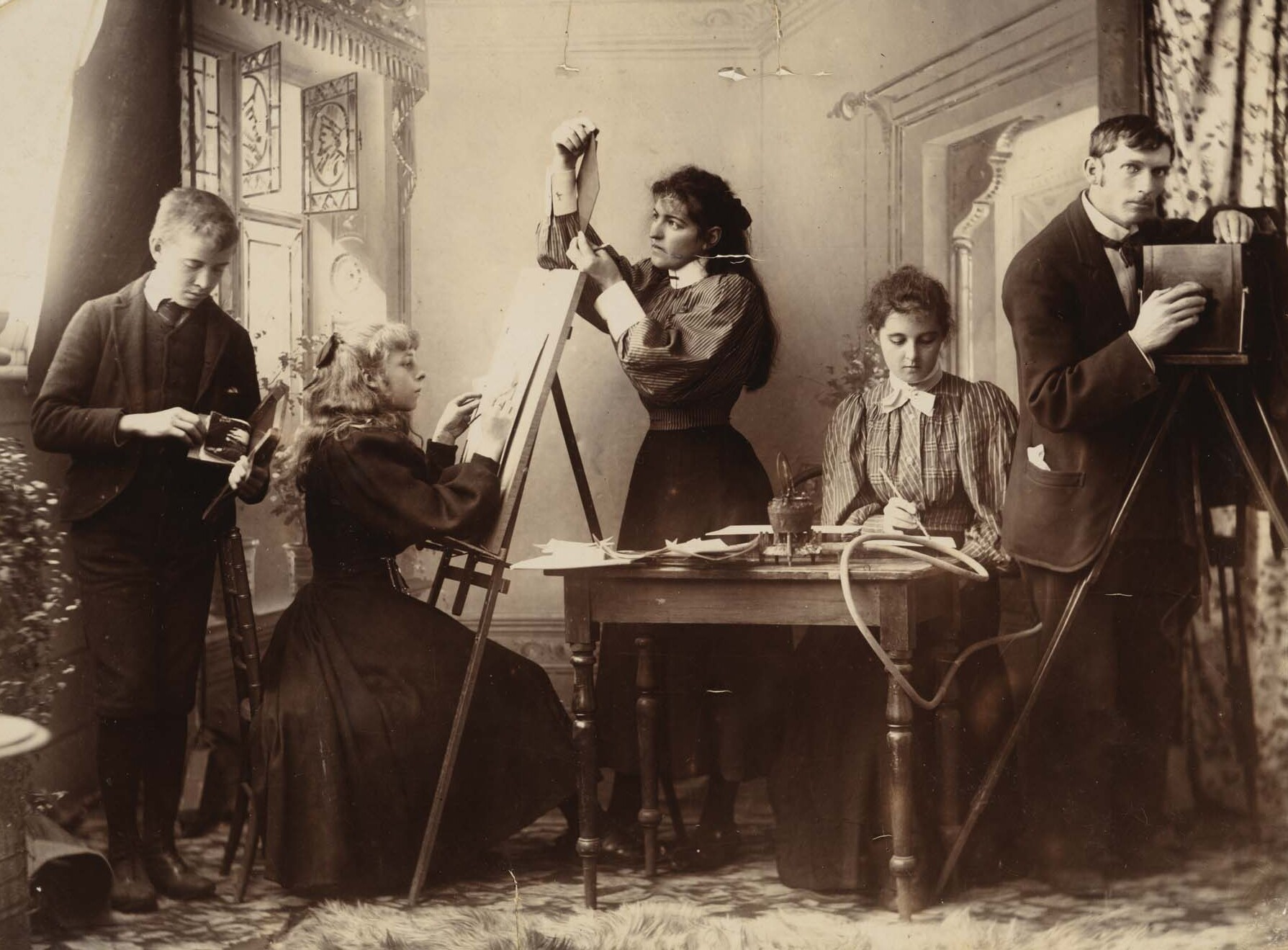
Gelatin silver print by Enos Pegler, circa 1900s

Local photographers embellished, staged and sometimes faked early tourist prints to ensure sales. Notable early British photographers include Alfred Barker, Alfred and Walter Burton (known as the Burton Brothers), Daniel Mundy, and James Bragge. The first photographs of the Pink and White Terraces were taken in 1859 by Bruno Hamel on Ferdinand Hochstetter's expedition. Others such as the Scottish photographer George Valentine documented the Terraces and other natural phenomena around Lake Rotomahana, both before and after the devastation caused by Mount Tarawera's 1886 eruption. See Valentine's 2004 exhibition in Christchurch Art Gallery.

Māori peoples were primarily on the other side of European lenses as distant subjects or forced sitters, but prominent Māori photographers authored their own work as well. While some rejected photography and its settler associations, other Māori adopted photographic technologies for cultural purposes, including tangi, for use in wharenui (meetinghouses), whakapapa, or as oral history prompts. The first photographic Māori portrait was taken by Lawson Insley in 1853, who actually captured two Māori women, Kararaina and Hera Barrett (also known as Caroline and Sarah). One of the first Māori and female photographers was Katarina Hansard (Īhāia); Cromwell Shepherd was among the first male Māori photographers.

== Women photographers ==
Women and young girls often worked behind the scenes in 19th century photographic studios, engaging in the creative and technical work of finishing photographs: retouching, hand-colouring, and mounting images. Many also owned and operated their own studios, providing easier and more comfortable portraiture settings for female subjects in a Victorian era.

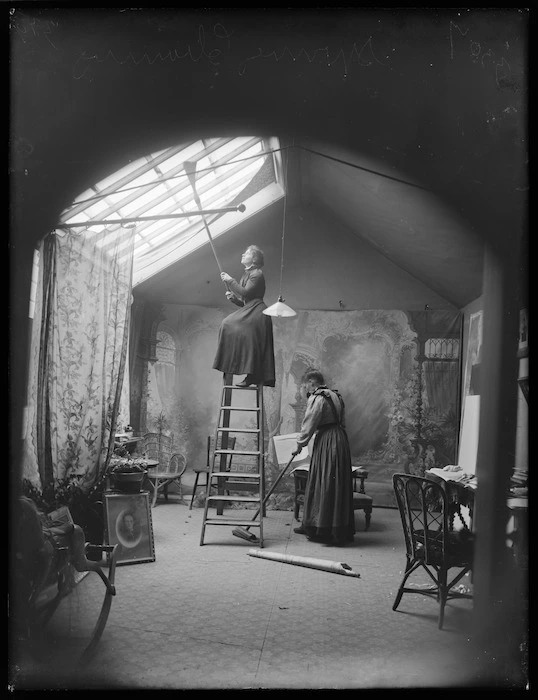
1901 photograph of Sarah Coombridge and Christina McAllister working in their photographic studio in Stratford, New Zealand

=== Māori ===
Katarina Hansard (Māori birthname Īhāia, Ngāpuhi) is cited as one of the first female and Māori photographers in New Zealand, operating a familial professional practice from 1897 onwards, including a photography school. Hinemoa Hamilton Shepherd (Ngāpuhi) similarly entered into the profession, assisting in the family practice beginning in 1917. Entertainer, scholar, and guide Mākereti Papakura (Te Arawa) wielded her own Kodak camera in the early 20th century. Ramai Rongomaitara Hayward (born Te Miha, Ngāti Kahungunu and Ngāi Tahu) practiced photography and operated multiple portrait studios on top of a prolific acting and filmmaking career that spanned across the greater part of the 1930s-1970s.

=== Pākehā ===
Emma Meluish operated photographic portrait studios in New Zealand with her husband William, practicing during the 1850s to 1860s. Elizabeth Pulman independently managed Pulman Studio after her husband's death in 1871; notably, she photographed Māori King Tāwhiao. Helen Stuart's hand-coloured portraits were highly admired, and later exhibited at the Auckland Society of Arts in the 1880s. Artist Louise Laurent was another famous retoucher, and attended Elam School of Fine Arts in 1896–7. Similar to Pulman, Louisa Hermann inherited and ran a successful studio business following the sudden passing of her husband in 1892; Florence Craig ran FE Craig and Jubilee Studios in 1900. Harriet Cobb was yet another prominent female photographer, retiring in 1911 after forty-four years in the industry.

== Photographic collections ==
- Tāmaki Paenga Hira Auckland War Memorial Museum
- Alexander Turnbull Library
- Toitū Otago Settlers Museum
- Hocken Collections Uare Taoka o Hākena (University of Otago)
- Museum of New Zealand Te Papa Tongarewa
- Archives New Zealand Te Rua Mahara o te Kāwanatanga

== Contemporary photography ==
Contemporary New Zealand photographers include Laurence Aberhart, Mark Adams, Brian Brake, Ben Cauchi, Marti Friedlander, Anne Geddes, Anne Noble, Fiona Pardington, Patrick Reynolds, Yvonne Todd, Christine Webster, Rita Dibert, Yvonne Westra and Ans Westra. Luit Bieringa has curated a number of influential New Zealand photography exhibitions.

== Photography associations and publications ==
- Dunedin Photographic Society | the oldest running photographic society in New Zealand, established 1890
- NZIPP - New Zealand Institute of Professional Photography | body of over 600 professional photographers, hosts an annual conference and Iris Awards ceremony, originally established 1938
- Advertising & Illustrative Photographers Association | for commercial photographers
- PhotoForum NZ | a non-profit society that publishes PhotoForum magazine (discontinued 1984), photography books, organises exhibitions, workshops, and lectures
- Photographic Society of New Zealand | for amateurs and professionals, hosting national conventions, workshops, and competitions
  - New Zealand Camera | the above organization's annual publication
- Auckland Photographic Society | similarly open to amateurs and professionals alike
- D-Photo | digital photography magazine

== See also ==
- List of New Zealand women photographers
- Photography in Australia
