= Wystan Curnow =

New Zealand art critic

Wystan Curnow CNZM
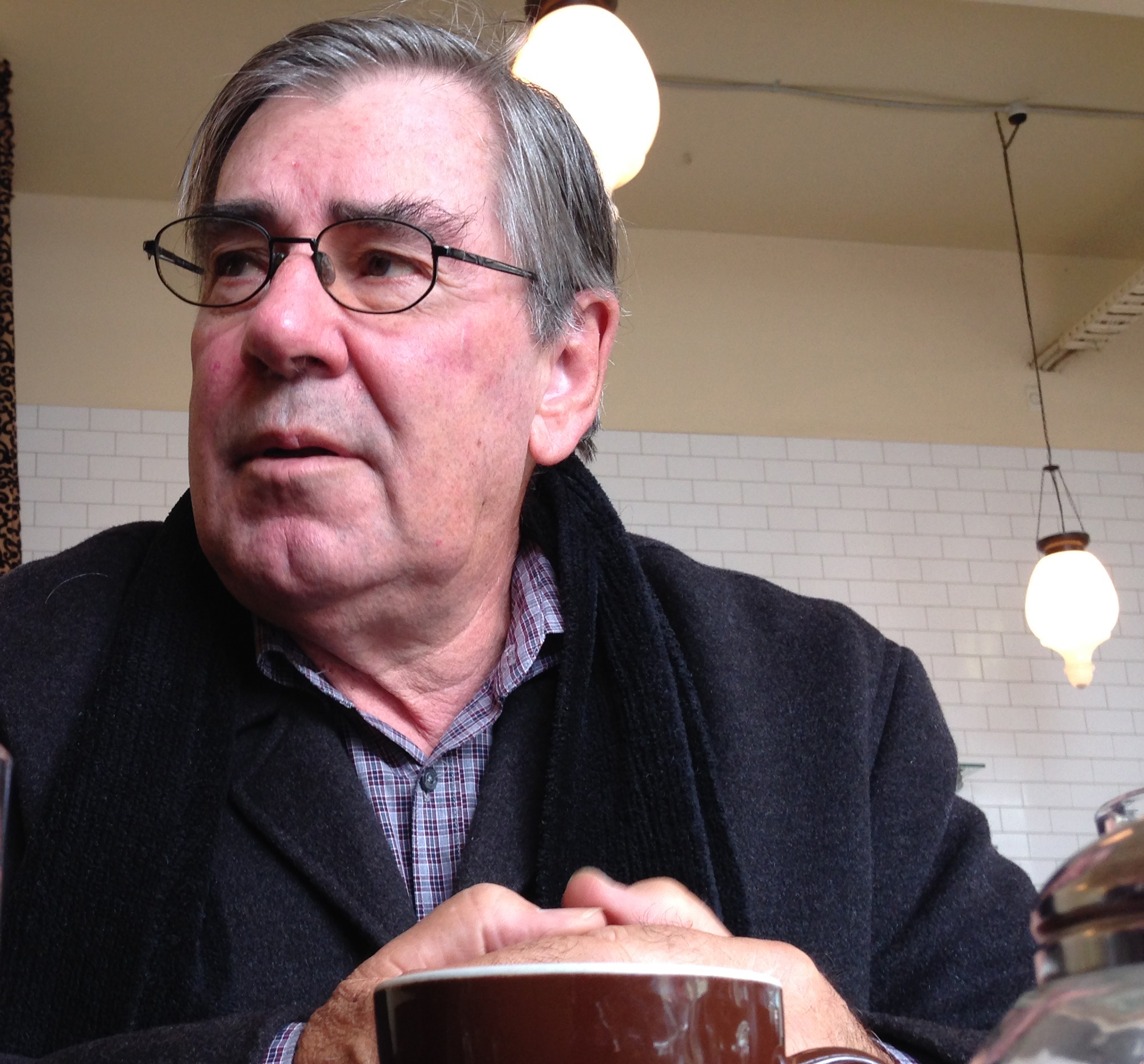
- Curnow in 2013
- Born: 1939 (age 86–87)
- Occupations: Art critic; poet; academic; independent curator
- Writing career
- Subjects: Contemporary New Zealand art; Billy Apple; Colin McCahon
- Notable awards: Prime Minister's Award for Literary Achievement in non-fiction (2018)

Wystan Tremayne Le Cren Curnow CNZM (born 1939) is a New Zealand art critic, poet, academic, arts administrator, and independent curator. He is the son of Elizabeth Curnow, a painter and printmaker, and poet Allen Curnow.

== Biography ==
Curnow was born in Christchurch in 1939 to Elizabeth and Allen Curnow. He was named after the modernist poet W.H. Auden (Wystan Hugh). His parents' home in the Christchurch suburb of Merivale was a hub for writers, artists, actors, and composers. Allen Curnow was closely associated with Denis Glover's flagship publishing business, Caxton Press, and the group of writers around this project, including Charles Brasch, Walter D'Arcy Cresswell, A. R. D. Fairburn, R.A.K. Mason and Ursula Bethell. Elizabeth Curnow was friends with artists such as Leo Bensemann, Evelyn Page, Douglas MacDiarmid, and Rita Angus.

The Curnow family moved to Auckland's North Shore in 1951, after Allen Curnow was offered a job lecturing in the English Department at Auckland University College. Wystan Curnow was educated at Takapuna Grammar School, and went on to complete a Masters of Arts in English with first-class honours at Auckland University College, graduating in 1961.

In 1961, Curnow married Susan Matthews, and they have four sons together.

In 1963, Curnow and his family moved to Philadelphia, where Curnow studied at the University of Pennsylvania under the supervision of Morse Peckham. Curnow studied 19th-century American literature and literary theory. His PhD thesis was entitled Melville's poetry up to 1876, and was completed in 1970. Curnow lectured in the English Department at the University of Rochester between 1967 and 1969, before returning to Auckland in 1970 to take up a lecturing position in the English Department at the University of Auckland, where for a number of years he worked alongside his father. Notable student's of Curnow's include Terry Locke.

Curnow has been based in Auckland since 1970, though has spent significant periods overseas, particularly in the United States and, most recently in 2010 undertook the Seresin Landfall Residency in Tuscany.

== Career ==
=== Art critic ===
Curnow is active in both literature and the visual arts. His writing and interests have been significantly influenced by his time in the United States in the 1960s (and lengthy return trips in the late 1970s and early 1980s) and his exposure to American modernist painting and conceptual art, and the writing of the language poets.

Curnow has written consistently on New Zealand post-object art and abstract painting from the 1970s onwards. Throughout his career, he has written most regularly on the work of artists Colin McCahon, Max Gimblett, Lawrence Weiner, Len Lye, Billy Apple, and Imants Tillers.

Curnow is also closely associated with many of the post-object and conceptual artists who were active in New Zealand from the 1970s onwards. Curnow had met artist Jim Allen in Auckland and when Curnow returned to Auckland in 1970, Allen was Head of the Sculpture Department at Elam School of Fine Arts at Auckland University. Allen and Curnow worked together often, and Curnow became an informal critic for the burgeoning post-object art scene centred on Allen and Elam. Artists whose work Curnow wrote about during this time were Peter Roche, Linda Buis, Andrew Drummond, David Mealing, Roger Peters, and Bruce Barber.

In 1973, Curnow edited the anthology Essays on New Zealand Literature (Auckland: Heinemann). This included his essay High Culture in a Small Province, which elucidates his position on art, literature, and cultural production more widely and its position within western society. This essay draws on the sociological writing of Curnow's PhD supervisor, Morse Peckham.

Jim Allen and Curnow also edited the most significant record of post-object art in the 1970s, New Art: Some Recent New Zealand Sculpture and Post-object Art (Auckland: Heinemann, 1976).

During the 1980s in particular, Curnow was also closely involved in small print run, so-called ‘little magazines’ where he published both poetry and art criticism. These publications are characterised by an interest in the developing theory of postmodernism, gaining academic traction at this time and included Parallax (he was a contributing editor), AND, and Splash (he was co-editor).

Throughout the 1980s, 1990s, and 2000s, Curnow contributed writing and criticism to a wide range of visual arts publications including international imprints Artforum, Studio International, Art Asia Pacific, Art and Text, Art and Australia, and New Zealand magazines and journals, including Art New Zealand, Midwest, New Zealand Listener, Art News New Zealand, Bulletin of New Zealand Art History, Log Illustrated, and Reading Room.

Published in 2014 was a significant anthology of Curnow's art writing, The Critic's Part: Wystan Curnow Art Writings 1971–2013, edited by Christina Barton and Robert Leonard and published by Victoria University Press.

=== Poet ===
Through his life, Curnow has also written poetry and published this in various publications. His poetry is most significantly influenced by the American L=A=N=G=U=A=G=E poets, a loosely defined movement of avant-garde poetry that emerged in the United States in the late 1960s and early 1970s.

In many of his writings, Curnow has sought to collapse the distinction between his art criticism and poetry, and sometimes these forms are indistinguishable from each other. An example of this is his essay in New Art: Some Recent New Zealand Sculpture and Post-object Art ‘Mt Eden Crater Performance’ (1976) which describes in stream-of-consciousness a performance piece by artist Bruce Barber.

=== Independent curator and arts administrator ===
Since the 1970s, Curnow has been consistently involved in the visual arts sector in New Zealand and internationally as a curator and arts administrator. Curnow has worked to raise the profile of New Zealand artists overseas and also to provide infrastructure and critical consideration to expatriate New Zealand artists Billy Apple and Len Lye.

In 1976, Curnow wrote an extended piece on Billy Apple's 1975 exhibition tour of New Zealand, 'Billy Apple in New Zealand' for Auckland Art Gallery Quarterly. After this time, Curnow kept in contact with Apple and has collaborated regularly with the artist ever since. Curnow acted as a self-described 'public relations officer', as well as curator, administrator and collaborator, for Apple on his 1979 exhibition tour of nine galleries in New Zealand.

Curnow has curated a number of exhibitions. He was the New Zealand Commissioner to Fourth Biennale of Sydney and curated I Will Need Words, a major exhibition of Colin McCahon's word and number paintings for the Fifth Biennale of Sydney in 1984. During the 1980s, he curated a series of exhibitions that employed postmodern theory to deconstruct meaning, language, and national identity. These included Sex & Sign (1987) and Putting the Land on the Map: Art and Cartography since 1840 (1989).

In 1998, he worked with Christina Barton, Robert Leonard, and John Hurrell to curate the critical overview and retrospective exhibition of post-objects art in New Zealand, Action Replay: Post-Object Art

In 2005, Curnow set up the art project space JAR, with Susan Davis, which has exhibited the work of artists Stephen Bambury, Peter Robinson, Leigh Davis, and Simon Ingram.

== Honours ==
In the 2005 New Year Honours, Curnow was appointed a Companion of the New Zealand Order of Merit, for services to art and literature. Curnow won the 2018 Non-fiction Award, New Zealand Prime Minister's Awards for Literary Achievement

== Selected output ==
=== Poetry books ===
- Cancer Daybook (Auckland: Van Guard Xpress, 1989)
- Back in the USA (Wellington: Black Light Press, 1989)
- Castor Bay, proses and pictures, 1996)
- Modern Colours (Auckland: Jack Books, 2005)

=== Exhibitions ===
- 1996 The World Over/Under Capricorn: Art in the Age of Globalisation Stedelijk Museum and City Gallery Wellington (with Dorine Mignot)
- 2017 Colin McCahon: On Going out with the Tide City Gallery, Wellington (With Robert Leonard)
