= Linda Buis =

New Zealand performance artist (1954–2015)

- Born: 1954; Auckland
- Died: 2015 (aged 60–61); Auckland
- Known for: Performance art works
- Notable work: 'Night piece' and 'Museum piece'

Linda Buis (1954–2015) was a performance artist working in New Zealand. With her partner Peter Roche, she created challenging long-durational live works that are now regarded as ‘some of the most important works' performed in New Zealand in the 70s.

== Early years ==
Linda Buis was born in 1954 to Simon and Christine Buis who had emigrated to New Zealand from Holland in the early 1950s. Her father was a photographer and an early member of PhotoForum, so although she did not go to art school, she was familiar with the Auckland art scene. Around 1978 Buis began a relationship with Peter Roche, an art student whose performance work included self-harm and mutilation. Her first presence in his work is shown in a photo taken early in 1979 in which Roche is lying on the floor with his arm bleeding and bandaged; pinned to the wall above him is a photo of Buis and Roche taken by Simon Buis. Basing themselves in Grafton with Buis's eight-year-old son, Buis and Roche worked part-time jobs and Initially had no plans to perform together on the long-term. As their own relationship developed though they both became committed to creating performances that investigated the psychological and social aspects of relationships.

== Buis / Roche ==
Roche and Buis worked together from 1979 to 1986 and presented 25 performances. Many of these works have close associations with performance pieces created in the USA and in particular with those of Marina Abramovic and Ulay. Buis and Roche had the opportunity to see Abramovic and Ulay performing in Christchurch when they were invited to participate in the first edition of ANZART organised by the artist Ian Hunter. In March 1980, in recognition of the continuing series of performances they had made together, the two formally announced their partnership. The announcement was made in conjunction with a series of performances at the photographic gallery Real Pictures.

Photography became increasingly important to the work both as a prop for performing and as a record of the performances themselves. Apart from images taken by Buis and Roche themselves during performances, most of the photographic record was created by artists Gergory Burke and Ron Brownson.

== Selected performance works by Buis and Roche ==
1979 (July) Get The Fuck Out, Got To Get Out, University of Auckland. One of their first joint performances, it was intended to challenge the audience and their expectations by insisting on their participation. The hour-long performance entailed the couple accepting and rejecting a number of different roles. They said of the piece, ‘In some ways our presence in performance can be seen as a prototype, and yet there is also the fact that our audience is never simply an observer... ‘

1979 (October) Oh Shit No, On The Contrary, Grafton Arts Centre, Auckland. The performance featured a film loop of Buis being repeatedly slapped by Roche while they both challenged each other and Buis's image on the screen. The work was planned to be a solo performance by Roche who commented at the time to Wystan Curnow, ‘When we began working together in 1979, there was no commitment made by either of us to continue a working relationship. Since that time, we have been working together constantly and have developed further and further an involvement in what might be termed the social and psychological conditions of relationship.

1980 (February) Street Piece, Queen Street, Auckland. This performance involved Buis and Roche performing in public during the day on Auckland's Queen Street. The two of them repeatedly crossed and recrossed the busy road while being recorded by Gregory Burke.

1980 (March) Liaison Assertive Cooperative, Real Pictures, Auckland. While the exhibition featured some of Roche's early solo work, it focussed on recent work made with Buis. It included an Abramovic / Ulay homage with Buis and Roche flanking a doorway forcing the audience to brush past them to enter the gallery. Unlike the Abramovic version both Buis and Roche were clothed. Wystan Curnow noted that since Buis had started working with Roche he had moved toward more gallery situated presentations. In Curnow's view the Real Pictures exhibition performances were some of the best work he had seen noting that, ‘Peter's liaison with Linda has given his (now their) work something it needed.’

1980 (August) Museum Piece, Auckland Domain. Buis and Roche performed this work around 3 A.M. in an Auckland park known for violent attacks after dark. Together they walked around the War Memorial Museum, a central feature of the park. They took photographs every 20 minutes knowing that the camera flash gave a good indication where they were to any potential aggressors. These photographs were later displayed as the record of the work. In 1995 Peter Roche and the Museum of New Zealand Te Papa Tongarewa revisited Museum Piece transforming it into a large photo installation.

1981 Eighth Sculpture Triennial, Mildura.

1981 ANZART, Robert McDougall Art Gallery and Art Centre Christchurch. This performance was held at 6AM possibly as a reference to the Abramovic Ulay performance that began at 6PM. As Roche walked up and down one ledge of the building repeatedly lighting and snuffing out candles, Buis crawled blindly, a blanket over her head, along the length of another ledge.

1981 Night Piece, Old Auckland Gas Works. Working at night, Roche distributed lighted candles around the floor of the old and abandoned Auckland Gas Works while 18 meters above him Buis crawled along the top of the Gas Work's walls for an hour and a half.

1982 Oh Shit No, On the Contrary. RKS Art Gallery, Auckland. A revisiting of their 1979 performance.

1983 ANZART Hobart (group). The two blindfolded performers dressed in white knelt opposite one another and repeatedly hunched over to touch foreheads. The hour-long performance put a considerable physical strain on both performers.

1983 Performance RKS Art Gallery, Auckland.

1985 ANZART Auckland ‘85: a trans-Tasman artists’ exchange.

1985 Conversations and interviews, RKS Art Gallery, Auckland. Roche and Buis described the works as ‘metaphors for emotion’

== Later years and recognition ==
By the end of 1984 Buis and Roche were both changing the way they thought about art and its practice at the same time as Roche's interest in building sculpture developed. Their new thinking was expressed in a letter from Europe in which they express their growing disillusionment with performance as an art form. ‘The term Performance Art has lost its magic for us. We are finding it too exclusive, and it would seem that too often in the past we have restricted our activities in order that they could be seen in a performance context.’ One of their final exhibitions was in December 1986 and featured a group of drawings they had made together along with mechanical sculptures by Roche.

Linda Buis died in 2015. It was not until 2023 that her contribution to performance art was formally recognised when it was the subject of the survey exhibition Peter Roche & Linda Buis, In Relation: Performance Works 1979–1985 at Te Pātaka Toi Adam Art Gallery, Wellington.

Night Piece: a documentary featuring Peter Roche and Linda Buis directed by Bridget Sutherland is a feature-length film that premiered at the New Zealand International Film Festival in 2024.

The Peter Roche and Linda Buis archive is held by the Eric McCormack Library at the Auckland Art Gallery. It includes a record of Buis and Roche's collaboration from 1979 – 1985.

== Collections ==
Te Papa Tongarewa
