= Peter Peryer =

New Zealand photographer (1941–2018)

Peter Peryer ONZM
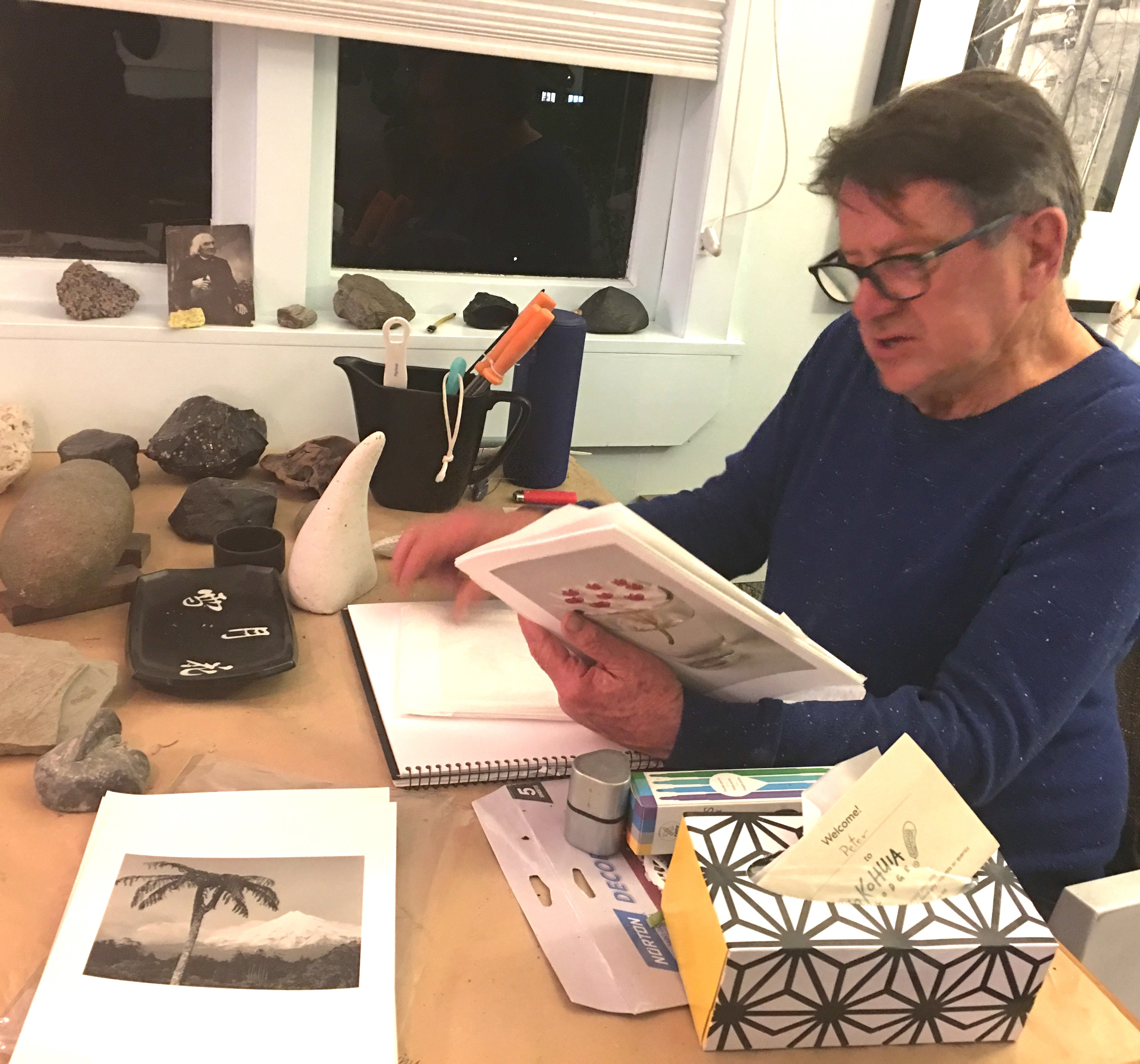
- Peryer in his New Plymouth studio, 2017
- Born: Peter Chanel Peryer; 2 November 1941; Ōtāhuhu, New Zealand
- Died: 18 November 2018 (aged 77); New Plymouth, New Zealand
- Education: MA in education (University of Auckland, 1972)
- Known for: Photography

Peter Chanel Peryer ONZM (2 November 1941 – 18 November 2018) was a New Zealand photographer. In 2000, he was one of the five inaugural laureates of the Arts Foundation of New Zealand.

== Career ==
Born in Ōtāhuhu, Auckland, on 2 November 1941, Peryer completed a Master of Arts in education at the University of Auckland in 1972, and lectured in English at Auckland Teachers' College. He began photographing in 1973, and was largely self-taught. His work was included in The Active Eye, the first survey of contemporary New Zealand photography, mounted by the Manawatu Art Gallery in 1975. Peryer held his first solo exhibition at the Dowse Art Museum in 1977; this was the first solo exhibition of a contemporary photographer at a New Zealand public art gallery. His work has been extensively exhibited in public and private art galleries throughout New Zealand and internationally, in solo exhibition and group shows.

In 1995 an exhibition of Peryer's work titled Second Nature: Peter Peryer Photographs toured New Zealand and Germany. One of the works used to advertise the exhibition in Europe was Dead Steer (1987), which depicts the bloated carcass of a cow on a rural roadside. New Zealand's then Minister of Agriculture John Falloon protested the inclusion and use of the work, on the basis that it was bad publicity for the New Zealand meat industry. He attempted unsuccessfully to have the exhibition closed and ordered the New Zealand High Commissioner to withdraw from attending an opening of the exhibition.

In the 1997 Queen's Birthday Honours, Peryer was appointed an Officer of the New Zealand Order of Merit, for services to photography. In 2000, he was among the five artists recognised by the Arts Foundation of New Zealand as their inaugural Laureates.

Peryer died in New Plymouth on 18 November 2018 at the age of 77.

== Work ==
Peyer began taking photographs with a cheap Diana camera. Early series and portfolios included Mars Hotel (1975), Gone Home (1975) and Souvenir (1976.) In a review of Peryer's early activity in late 1977 critic Neil Rowe wrote "Although he has been taking photographs seriously for only two years he has achieved a highly distinctive style and an intensely personal repertoire of imagery".

In 1979 Peryer was included in the Auckland Art Gallery exhibition Three New Zealand photographers: Fiona Clark, Laurence Aberhart, Peter Peryer, which toured to nine other galleries. Peryer showed 11 works, including a number of photographs of various zoo animals, including pelican, ibis, peacock, alligator, monitor lizard, kingfisher. Each animal was captured in such a way that its surrounding enclosure was not removed but suggested in the image, an ongoing theme of Peryer's work.

Peryer's best-known early works are a series of photographs taken of his then-wife, Erika Parkinson. The portraits were gathered into a 2000–01 touring exhibition Erika: A Portrait by Peter Peryer. The exhibition curator Justin Paton wrote at the time:

Nothing in New Zealand photography of the seventies has the same psychological charge or stark glamour. Two decades later they still feel urgent, as if the need to look ignited the need to be looked at, and the photos just flared into being.

In a 1989 article looking back over the first 15 years of Peryer's photography career, curator Ann Elias wrote:

The group of powerful human portraits that established Peryer's reputation in the second half of the nineteen-seventies were often melodramas in which he romanticised the subject (himself, Erika, Christine Mathieson and others) through devices many artists have used in the same deliberate way – a dark and grainy technique to intensify the mystery; the choice of a haunted, confrontational or tragic expression to intensify the seriousness; and the incorporation of objects, sometimes extraneous (a rooster, a fish), often clothing, to intensify the narrative. ... A comparison of his early photographs with the most recent shows how Peryer has altered his position on the making of images. Six Foot Lake, Campbell Island can only be described as understated compared with the orchestrated drama of the early portraits.

Writing in the mid-1990s, curator Robert Leonard observed "Peter Peryer made his name as an expressive photographer producing angst-ridden portraits. A change of heart in the early 1980s saw him adopt a more formalist approach, treating miscellaneous subjects in a more documentary but still quirky way." In a 1985 exhibition catalogue Peryer said:

I work in an additive way. I tend to start with a blank picture and add the elements one by one. That's one of the reasons why so few of my pictures have horizons because it is quite hard to control the background … a painter can subtract or alter – I just build up.

Photography critic Peter Ireland traced the "growing formalism" of Peryer's works to the Grid Series of 1981. He noted that "While Peryer draws on movements and artists as distinct as Constructivism, German avant-garde photography, and Moholy-Nagy, his intellect saves this from being merely an art-historical tour to mould it into a highly-personal visual ideology". Robert Leonard also noted Moholy-Nagy and the "New Photography" movement of Weimar Germany when citing Peryer's influences and sources, but also noted "various non-art vernaculars, like botanical and catalogue photography, National Geographic, and scenic postcards." Peryer himself identified Edward Weston as a photographer he looked to, "but I was influenced not by the images so much as by the fact that he quit everything to pursue a life as a photographer. And what's more he wrote most eloquently about it."

== Solo exhibitions ==
- 2014 Peter Peryer: A Careful Eye, The Dowse Art Museum and Sarjeant Art Gallery
- 2012 Other: photographic portraits 1975–2011, Gus Fisher Gallery, Auckland
- 2001–2002 Erika: A Portrait by Peter Peryer, Dunedin Public Art Gallery City Gallery Wellington and Auckland Art Gallery
- 2001 The left hand raised, Govett-Brewster Art Gallery
- 1997 At home and away: recent photographs, Sarjeant Art Gallery
- 1995–1996 Second Nature, touring New Zealand and Germany
- 1986 Peter Peryer: Photographs, Sarjeant Art Gallery and touring
- 1977 Peter Peryer: An Introduction, The Dowse Art Museum

== Publications ==
- Peter Peryer: A Careful Eye, Lower Hutt: The Dowse Art Museum, 2014. ISBN 9780987668547
- Peter Simpson, Peter Peryer : photographer, Auckland: Auckland University Press, 2008. ISBN 9781869404178
- Silver / Peter Peryer, photographs : Bill Manhire, poem, Whanganui: McNamara Gallery, 2006. ISBN 0958272417
- Greg Burke, The left hand raised : photographs, 1995–2001, New Plymouth: Govett-Brewster Art Gallery, 2001. ISBN 0908848390
- Justin Paton, Erika : a portrait / by Peter Peryer, Dunedin: Dunedin Public Art Gallery, 2001. ISBN 0908910231
- David Maskill, After Rembrandt by Peter Peryer, Wellington: Adam Art Gallery, 1999. ISBN 0958211248
- Charles Eldredge, At home and away : recent photographs, Whanganui: Sarjeant Art Gallery, 1997.
- Greg Burke, Second nature : Peter Peryer, Zurich: Edition Stemmle, 1995. ISBN 3905514567
- Peter Peryer: Photographs, Whanganui: The Sarjeant Art Gallery, 1985.

== Documentaries ==
A television documentary on Peryer, Peter Peryer: Portrait of a Photographer, was produced in 1994, directed by Greg Stitt.

Director Shirley Horrocks documentary Peter Peryer: the Art of Seeing was produced in 2019.

== Collections ==
Peryer's work is held in public collections throughout New Zealand and Australia.

- Art Gallery of New South Wales
- Auckland Art Gallery
- Christchurch Art Gallery
- Museum of New Zealand Te Papa Tongarewa
- National Gallery of Victoria
- Sarjeant Gallery
