= Tia Ranginui =

New Zealand photographer

- Born: Whanganui
- Known for: Photography

Tia Huia Ranginui is an artist from Whanganui, New Zealand and her main artform is photography. Her work is held in public collections including at the Sarjeant Gallery Te Whare o Rehua, Whanganui.

== History ==
Ranginui grew up along the Whanganui river at Koriniti. Ranginui is Māori affiliated to the hapū Ngāti Hine Oneone, of Whanganui iwi.

Ranginui is a self-trained artist and in addition to her art practice works as a gallery assistant in Whanganui. Themes in her work include Māori representation in art and stories from her local region of Whanganui. Her works are described by art critic Robert Leonard as ranging 'from the polemical and political to the enigmatic and poetic' and have also been described as magic realism. In a review of her work in the journal Art New Zealand, Milly Mitchell-Anyon says: "Her photographs are steeped in history whilst simultaneously balancing contemporary concerns."

In 2021 Ranginui collaborated with writer Arihia Latham. Latham wrote a poetic essay in response to Ranginui's work for Photo Forum Online. Arihia Latham (Kai Tahu) is writer and also Māori health practitioner of rongoā.

Public collections which include work of Ranginui include Waikato Museum Te Whare Taonga o Waikato, The Dowse Art Museum, City Gallery, Wellington and the Sarjeant Gallery Te Whare o Rehua, St Peter’s School Cambridge, Te Wānanga o Aotearoa and the Arts House Trust.

== Selected exhibitions ==
Ranginui's first solo exhibition was in 2015.

The exhibition Tāwauwau (Away) includes a sequence of 'patupaiarehe' photographs. These are creatures of Māori folklore with 'red hair and fair complexions' and Ranginui has them placed in contemporary suburbs of Whanganui.

=== Solo ===
- entitled film stills, Space Studio & Gallery, Whanganui (16 February - 1 March 2019)
- Tua o Tāwauwau, Contemporary Art Space, New Plymouth (31 October - 5 December 2020)
- Gonville Gothic, City Gallery Wellington, Wellington, (14 August - 31 October 2021)
- Tia Ranginui, Laree Payne Gallery, Hamilton (2021)
- Tua o Tāwauwau, The Sarjeant Gallery, Whanganui (28 May – 21 August 2022)
- Gonville Gothic, Te Uru, Auckland, (10 September - 26 February 2023)
- Ahi Teretere, Te Wahre o Rehua Sarjeant Gallery (2024-2025)

=== Group ===
- Te Hau Whakatonu: A Series of Never-Ending Beginnings, Govett-Brewster Art Gallery, New Plymouth (2024)
- Slow Burn: Women and Photography | Ahi Tāmau: Māreikura Whakaahua, 1 March 2026 - 31 January 2027, Museum of New Zealand Te Papa Tongarewa, Wellington.
