= The Active Eye =

1975 exhibition of work by New Zealand photographers

The Active Eye was a 1975 exhibition of work by contemporary New Zealand photographers, originated by the Manawatu Art Gallery in Palmerston North and touring to other galleries around New Zealand. The exhibition was one of the first to focus on contemporary photography in New Zealand, and attracted considerable controversy around the works included by artist Fiona Clark.

== The exhibition ==
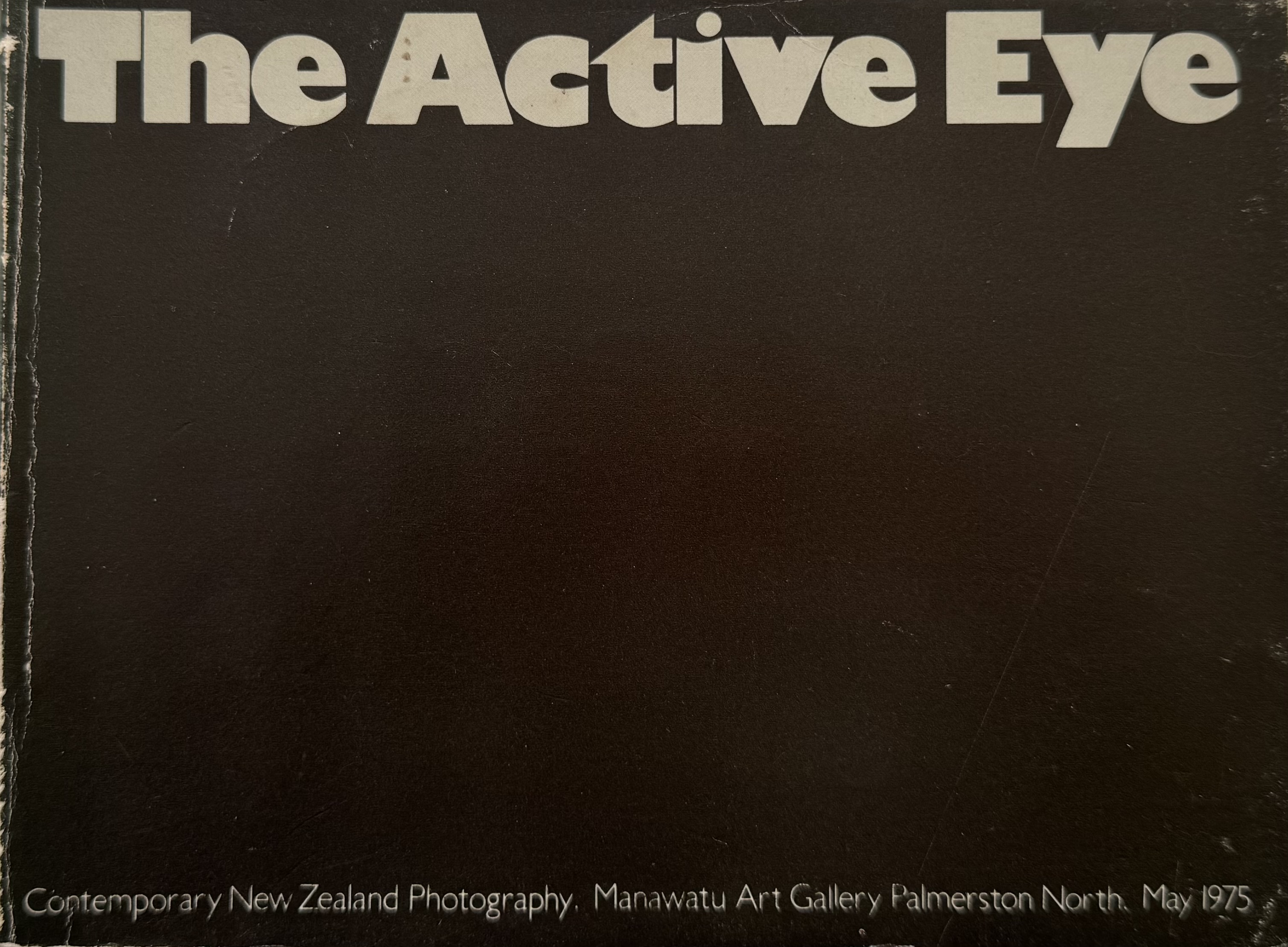
The Active Eye catalogue cover

The exhibition was a collaboration between photography organisation PhotoForum and the Manawatu Art Gallery under the director at the time, Luit Bieringa, and based on photos selected by Tom Hutchins, John B. Turner and Gordon H. Brown. It was sponsored by the Queens Elizabeth II Arts Council and Kodak New Zealand.

The exhibition consisted of 104 works. The exhibition was scheduled to show in 12 New Zealand art galleries.

== The photographers ==
Fifty two photographers are listed in the catalogue. They are: Laurence Aberhart, T V Austin, Gary Baigent, J G Blackman, Ben Boer, Justin Boroughs, Rhondda Bosworth, Joan Brown, Simon Buis, Glenn Busch, Murray Cammick, Dean Camp, Neil Carrie, Fiona Clark, Richard Collins, Bryony Dalefield, Jon S Daley, Gregg Devereaux, Brian Donovan, John Eastcott, John Fields, Michael Fitzgerald, Ken Foster, David A Fowler, Marti Friedlander, Murray Hedwig, Paul Hewson, Gary Ireland, Dave King, Graham Kirk, Steven La Plant, Graeme Leng-Ward, Darius McCallum, Allan McDonald, Jon Magill, Janet Mayo, John Miller, Mac Miller, Robin Morrison, Max Oettli, Peter Peryer, Mick Smith, Clive Stone, Do Van Toan, Roger Tolladay, Noel A Trustrum, Trevor Ulyatt, Kay Ungemeuth, Len Wesney, Ans Westra, David S Whyte, Stuart Young.

== Censorship controversy ==
Two works, both titled Dance by photographer Fiona Clark included in the exhibition raised objections from local authorities, members of the public and the police were removed from the exhibition during its tour. The two black and white images were from a series of ten images, taken by Clark at a dance party at the University of Auckland café for Pride Week in 1974. The photographs depict transgender women, and the white paper around the images were inscribed with short texts by a friend of Clark's, including phrases such as 'Aren’t you furious you hung up closet queens' and 'How many of you boys would like to suck these tits or have them for your own?'.

The exhibition ran into difficulty on the first stop of its nation-wide tour. At the Govett-Brewster Art Gallery in New Plymouth all was well for the two first weeks until the Mayor of New Plymouth Denis Sutherland told the gallery to remove the two Clark photographs. The Mayor claimed he had no problem with the photographs, only the captions. The police had already inspected the works and had taken no further action but a number of public complaints had been made. As the curator of the exhibition and Director of the Manawatu Art Gallery (now known as Te Manawa) Luit Bieringa made it clear the captions were not to be covered the two works were removed and placed in the Directors office where they could be seen on request. Some people took up the offer to view the works. Acting Director Don Driver said of them, ‘they just shrugged their shoulders’. The works were also removed at the next two venues the Waikato Art Museum and the Christchurch Art Gallery. This set the tone for other galleries on the tour until the exhibition was due to show at the Auckland City Art Gallery in March 1976 where the Director Ernest Smith rather than remove the works after a warning from Police that they would prosecute under the Indecent Publications Act, cancelled the entire exhibition The final venue of the tour, the Dowse Art Gallery in Lower Hutt, side-stepped the issue by having the work shown at the Settlement café and art gallery in nearby Wellington. However on arrival the two works by Fiona Clark were found to have gone missing.

== Impact and legacy ==
The Active Eye marked an important point in photography's acceptance as a contemporary art form in New Zealand. In the mid 1970s few New Zealand public art galleries collected or showed contemporary photography. The Active Eye, as the first national survey of contemporary photography, is viewed as a turning point in the art form's position in New Zealand art history and art discourse.

The works shown in The Active Eye were acquired by the Manawatu Art Gallery (now Te Manawa) as the basis of their contemporary photography collection. A selection were displayed in 2012 in the exhibition Now and Then.
