= Ranginui (disambiguation) =

Ranginui (or Rangi, Raki, or Rakinui) is, in Māori myth, the primal father involved in creating the world

Ranginui may also refer to:

- Ngāti Ranginui, a Bay of Plenty Māori iwi (tribe),
- Tia Huia Ranginui, an artist from Whanganui,
- Ranginui, the highest peak in the Rangitoto Range
