= Robert Leonard (curator) =

New Zealand art curator (born 1963)

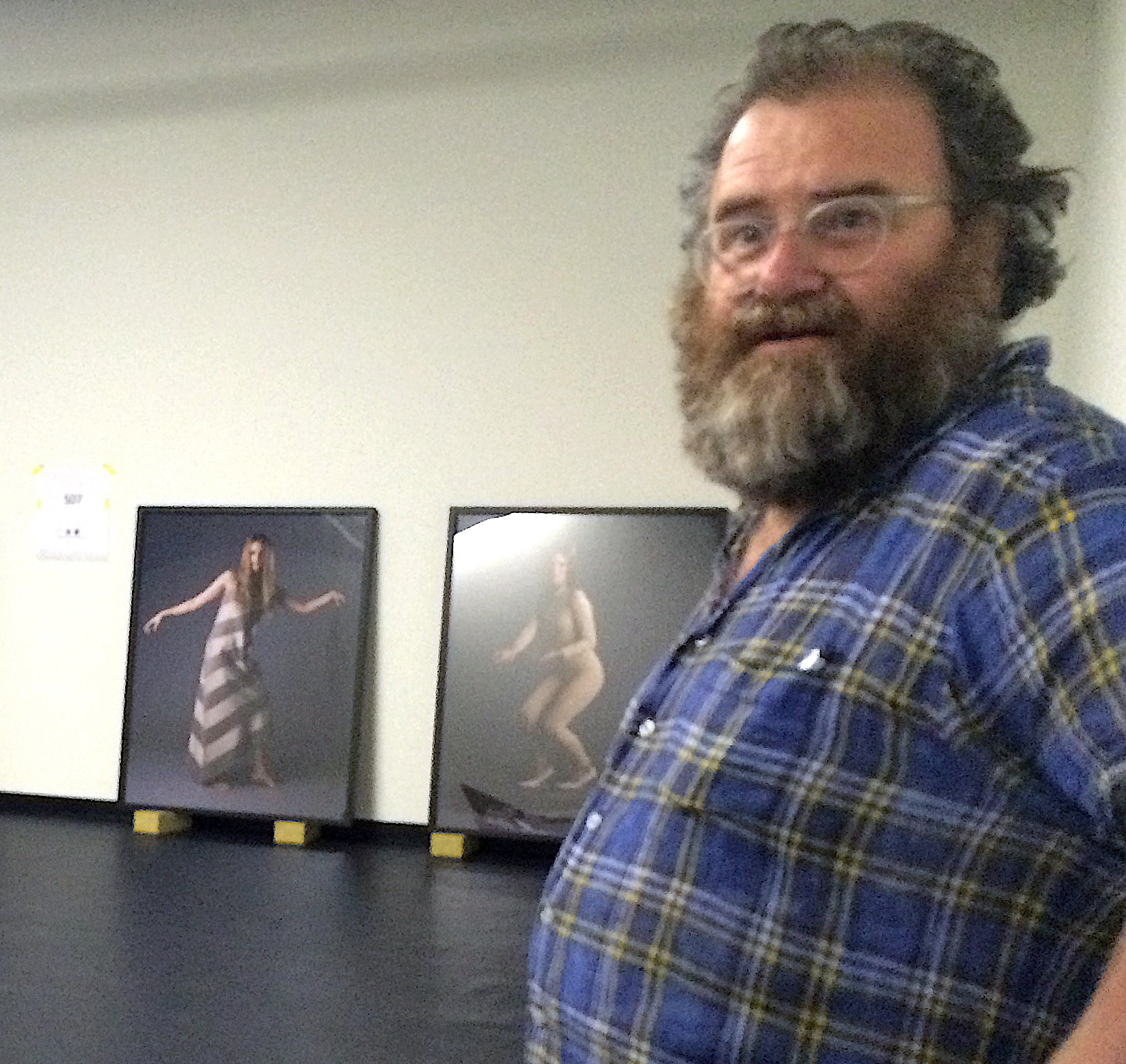
- Robert Leonard setting up the exhibition 'Yvonne Todd: Creamy Psychology', 2014
- Born: 1963 (age 62–63)
- Occupation: Art curator, writer and publisher
- Notable awards: 2002 J.D. Stout Research Fellow at the Victoria University of Wellington.

Website
- robertleonard.org

Robert Leonard (born 1963) is a New Zealand art curator, writer, and publisher. He has held prominent roles at galleries in Australia and New Zealand including Institute of Modern Art, Brisbane and the City Gallery in Wellington.

== History ==
Robert Leonard began his curatorial career at the National Art Gallery (now Te Papa Tongarewa) in Wellington. In 1985 he was the first Queen Elizabeth II Arts Council/National Art Gallery curatorial intern scheme trainee and the next year he was appointed as the National Art Gallery's first Curator of Contemporary Art. In 1991 he was appointed as the first curator at the Govett-Brewster Art Gallery in New Plymouth, and three years later moved to the Dunedin Public Art Gallery as a curator under director John McCormack. In 1997 he became the Director of Artspace in Auckland. At the end of his three-year term Leonard was awarded the year-long John David Stout Fellowship in New Zealand Studies, which he completed in Wellington before returning to Auckland in 2003 as a curator at the Auckland Art Gallery.

Leonard left New Zealand in 2005 to become Director of the Institute of Modern Art (IMA) in Brisbane, Australia, where he remained for the next eight years. In 2014 he returned to New Zealand as Chief Curator at City Gallery in Wellington. A controversial restructuring of City Gallery in 2021 disestablished this role and he spent the following year on projects including an advisory role with Webb's Auctions, and editing the magazine Art News New Zealand. He returned to Brisbane to take up the directorship of the IMA in Brisbane for a second term in 2023.

== Exhibitions ==
Early in his career Leonard curated one of the most influential exhibitions mounted by the National Art Gallery (now Te Papa Tongarewa), Headlands: Thinking Through New Zealand Art. Commissioned by the MCA in Sydney, Headlands sparked discussions around Internationalism around who or what should represent New Zealand art and cultural appropriation focusing on the koru series of paintings the artist Gordon Walters started with the work Te Whiti. As academic Conal McCarthy put it, “Headlands is an exhibition that everybody has an opinion about.”

Leonard curated other overseas exhibitions of New Zealand artists, including New Zealand's representation at the 2002 Venice Biennale, Michael Stevenson: This Is the Trekka, and Simon Denny: Secret Power in 2013. Leonard also curated Gavin Hipkins: The Colony for the 2002 São Paulo Biennial and the New Zealand presence at the Asia Pacific Triennial in 1999.

Other exhibitions curated by Leonard include:

- 1989 Nobodies: Adventures of the Generic Figure. Leonard's first major exhibition as curator at the National Art Gallery was shown in Shed 11 the Temporary/Contemporary.
- 1994: Kiss the Baby Goodbye. Michael Parekowhai’s first exhibition in a public institution was co-curated with Lara Strongman. It was exhibited at both the Govett-Brewster Art Gallery and Waikato Art Museum. In 1999, while Director at Artspace, Leonard curated another important Parekowhai exhibition, Ten Guitars, an installation of ten Patriot guitars modified with traditional Māori patterns and played in unison at the opening a gesture that academic critic Wystan Curnow described as ‘high-culture action’.
- 1998: Action Replay: Post-Object Art. This exhibition re-looked at the conceptual post-object art made in New Zealand in the 1970s. Co-curated with Wystan Curnow and Christina Barton, it was staged over three venues: Artspace, Auckland Art Gallery, and the Govett-Brewster Art Gallery.
- 2005: Mixed-up Childhood. Working with early childhood researcher Janita Craw, the work of both local and international artists was selected including Paul McCarthy, Sally Mann, Mike Kelly, Christian Boltanski and Grayson Perry to investigate ‘the state or time of being a child’.
- 2014: Yvonne Todd: Creamy Psychology. In his first year at City Gallery, Leonard devoted the entire space to an exhibition of 150 photographs by the Auckland photographer Yvonne Todd. She had won the first Walters Prize in 2008. The exhibition featured many of the outfits Todd had used to ‘costume’ her models.
- 2015: Jono Rotman: Mongrel Mob Portraits. Like a number of Leonard's exhibitions, Rotman's dramatic portraits of gang members created considerable discussion including charges of ‘glamourising gang culture’ and ‘cultural pornography’. The latter comment was triggered by an image of a convicted killer.
- 2021: Tia Ranginui: Gonville Gothic, City Gallery Wellington, Wellington, (14 August - 31 October 2021). An exhibition of photography Leonard describes the work as ranging 'from the polemical and political to the enigmatic and poetic.'

== Writing ==
Leonard is a writer and commentator on contemporary art. In 2002 he was J.D. Stout Research Fellow at the Victoria University of Wellington. His published work includes:

- Michael Parekowhai: Against Purity (1991)
- Mod Cons Headlands: Thinking Through New Zealand Art (1992)
- Peter Peryer: Second Nature (1996)
- Peter Robinson’s Strategic Plan (1997)
- Hello Darkness: New Zealand Gothic (2008)
- Nostalgia for Intimacy (2012)
- Wellness versus Art (2021)

== Publishing ==
Leonard has worked with a number of art publications including Midwest (co-edited from 1992 to 1996), the Reading Room Journal (co-edited in 2007), the Australian and New Zealand Journal of Art (managing editor from 2007 to 2013, and Art News (editor from 2021 to 2022). He was also a member of the editorial Board of Art and Text from 1994 to 1999, and has edited a number of books including The Critic's Part: Wystan Curnow Art Writings 1971-2013 (2014, with Christina Barton and Thomasin Sleigh). and Creamy Psychology / Yvonne Todd.

In 2020 Leonard established the publishing imprint Bouncy Castle. Its first publication was The Homely II, a photographic project by Gavin Hipkins co-published with City Gallery Wellington. It won a Best Award for 2021. In 2023 Bouncy Castle co-published Giovanni Intra Clinic of Phantasms: Writings 1994-2002 with the American publisher Semiotext(e).
