= Yvonne Todd =

New Zealand photographer (born 1973)

Yvonne Todd (born 1973) is a contemporary New Zealand photographer known for her manipulation of conventional photographic techniques and genres.

== Early life and education ==
Todd was born in Takapuna, Auckland. In the mid 1990s, she studied professional photography at Unitec Institute of Technology. She completed a Bachelor of Fine Arts at Elam School of Fine Arts in 2001.

== Career ==
Todd won the inaugural Walters Prize (New Zealand's largest contemporary art prize) in 2002 at age 28 for her collection of work Asthma & Eczema, which had been her final-year submission at art school.

In 2014 and 2015 City Gallery Wellington mounted a major survey of her works Yvonne Todd: Creamy Psychology, including over 150 pieces, curated by Robert Leonard.

== Exhibitions ==
=== Solo exhibitions ===
- Dead Starlets Assoc, IMA, Brisbane (2007)
- Wall of Seahorsel, Dunedin Public Art Gallery (2012–2013)
- Yvonne Todd: Creamy Psychology, City Gallery Wellington (2014–2015)
- Barnacles – Yvonne Todd, Tauranga Art Gallery (2016)

=== Group exhibitions ===
- Telecom Prospect 2004: New Art New Zealand, City Gallery Wellington (2004)
- Mixed-up Childhood, Auckland Art Gallery (2005)
- Busan Biennale, Republic of Korea (2006)
- Blood, in its Various Forms at the Institute of Modern Art, Brisbane (2007)
- Fotofestival, Mannheim, Germany (2009)
- 17th Biennale of Sydney (2010)
- Unnerved: The New Zealand Project, National Gallery of Victoria and Queensland Art Gallery (2010)
- Edinburgh Art Festival (2014)

== Publications ==
- Robert Leonard (ed.), Dead Starlets Assoc, Brisbane: Institute of Modern Art, 2007. ISBN 9781875792580.
- Robert Leonard (ed.), Creamy Psychology, Wellington: City Gallery Wellington and Victoria University Press, 2014. ISBN 9780864739773.
