= PhotoForum =

Non-profit New Zealand photography organisation

PhotoForum Inc. is a non-profit New Zealand photography organisation founded 12 December 1973 in Wellington "dedicated to the promotion of photography as a means of communication and expression," and PhotoForum is also the title of its magazine, first published in February 1974.

The magazine issues were discontinued after 1984, but the organisation continues to publish a series of books on New Zealand photography and photographers with the same ISSN. One of these, number 83, is a 273 page, large format history of PhotoForum Inc. published with Rim Books and edited by art historian Nina Seja.

== History ==
=== Background ===
Desmond Kelly and John B. Turner screened documentary films, and held discussions, on photography in Wellington over 1969/70. They and their audience noted the prevalent lack of attention to, or analysis of, photography in New Zealand other than as a commercial profession or an amateur activity. Photography publications existed but were mostly books presenting the country's landscape often with an eye to tourism, and hobby, trade, technical and photographic society journals; New Zealand Studio, the journal of the New Zealand Professional Photographers’ Association 1952–1975; New Zealand Camera, journal of the Photographic Society of New Zealand, launched in 1954; and Photographics New Zealand magazine 1961–1963.

=== Publication ===
Kelly and Turner met Bruce Weatherall who subsequently in 1970 published the newsletter Photographic Art & History, which was the precursor to Photo-Forum magazine. Its first issue covered conservation of photographs, appreciation of fine art photography, collecting photographic equipment, and the history of photography, and called for expressions of interest in contributing to further newsletters. Kelly and Turner became co-editors of the magazine with Weatherall from issue 2.

They turned attention to New Zealand photographers Tudor Collins, Mac Miller, John Daley, and the current Maori in Focus exhibition, and in issue 3 covered Ans Westra, Mac Miller, and Hill & Adamson in New Zealand. After issue 4, featuring reviews of the 19th Century New Zealand Photography exhibition; Photography, A Visual Dialect, Gernsheim’s History of Photography; Hardwicke Knight’s First Century of Photography exhibition; and an article on the photographer J.N. Crombie, the journal was renamed New Zealand Photography.

Under the new title New Zealand Photography and from 1971 the content was more internationally focused and included Keri McCleary's reviews of New Zealand exhibitions of Brassaï and Photography 1971 exhibitions, and articles on the American Bruce Davidson and the French photojournalist Cartier-Bresson, with others on New Zealanders James Chapman-Taylor and others.

Through 1972/73 more attention was given to New Zealand photographers and exhibitions, with articles on, and photographs by, Alan Leatherby; Richard Collins; Roger Leach; James McDonald; Lloyd Homer; Keri McCleary; Max Oettli; D.L. Mundy; Simon Buis; John Fields; Walter Logeman; Mike Hammersley; Allan McDonald; Don Roy; Clive Stone; John Milnes; Jim Payne; Harry Foster; Ans Westra; Barry Lett Galleries; Bryan James; Historical New Zealand photographs in Australia; Bryan James; Ken Foster; Corynne Bootten; Graham Mitchell; Grant Douglas; the Elam Workshop; John Daley; Victorian photographs of Wellington; Michael Hawkins; the Photographic Communication Symposium; Barry Myers; Barry Hesson; Paul Cooper; Gary Baigent; Paul Gilbert; Rev. John Kinder; Christchurch photographers at Victoria Market Gallery; Leith F. Jennings.

After Weatherall departed for a position as Lecturer in Journalism at the University of Canterbury in 1974, Turner took over New Zealand Photography magazine and re-launched it as Photo-Forum magazine in February 1974, the title inspired by the American Artforum. As well as its magazine, the organisation also produced posters, postcard sets, diaries, calendars, newsletters and books.

PhotoForum ceased publication as a magazine in 1984, replaced by the irregular issue of book-format titles which continued the magazine numbering and its ISSN. Subscribed members received MoMento, published from January 2008.

PhotoForum started an online presence in 1996 and then relaunched PhotoForum Online in 2018 to publish reviews, essays and news.

=== Organisation ===
On 12 December 1973, founders Ken Browning, Paul Fudakowski, Bob Jones, Peter Maughan, Max Oettli, Peter Robson, Larence N. Shustak, and John B. Turner contributed $1000 each to register PhotoForum as an Incorporated Society. Max Oettli became first President of the Society, Treasurer was Wendy Turner; Secretary, Janet Mayo; Photo-Forum (originally hyphenated thus) Editor was John Turner, and Associate Editors Laurence Shustak and Do Van Toan.

In 1989 a restructure, which replaced the position of President with a Director, Sally Symes was appointed to the role, which she retained until her resignation and replacement by John B. Turner in 1993. He resigned in July 2012, precipitated by his relocation to Beijing, though he retained his role as co-Managing Editor beside Haruhiko Sameshima. Geoffrey Short, who featured in the 2012 MoMento 10, and who had been employed as gallery Manager in 1987, replaced Turner as Director.

== The magazine contents 1974-1984 ==
1974

- Photo-Forum 18 (February/March): Nudes; Clive Stone portfolio.
- Photo-Forum 19 (April/May): Time-themed portfolio: F.W. Young, James Bragge, Charles Spencer, Gordon H. Burt, Paul Gilbert; John Fields and Glenn Busch portfolios.
- Photo-Forum 20 (June/July): Len Wesney landscapes; Workshop ’74; Wellington Polytechnic photography.
- Photo-Forum 21 (August/September): Bryony Dalefield, Murray Hedwig, Noel Trustrum; large format photography; August Sander book review.
- Photo-Forum 22 (October/November): The New Zealand landscape: John Johns, Alfred H. Burton, Ken Foster; Max Oettli; Andre Kertesz book review.
- Photo-Forum 23 (December 1974/January 1975): Five portfolios: Charles McKenzie; Peter Maughan; Neil Carrie; Sally Tagg; Bernard Schofield; Minor White; The Painter and the Photograph review

1975

- Photo-Forum 24 (February/March): Elam portfolio; Tom Hutchins guest editorial; John Szarkowski: Looking at Photographs; first of William Main’s Collector’s Piece columns.
- Photo-Forum 25 (April/May): Ben Boer and Glenn Busch portfolios; review of Bragge’s Wellington and the Wairarapa, by William Main.
- Photo-Forum 26 (June/July): Joseph D. Jachna Jr. Door County Landscapes; Six French Photographers review.
- Photo-Forum 27 (August/September): Greg McBean; Merylyn Tweedie; The Active Eye; Creative Camera Yearbook; Tiny Grey (Simon Buis) Offshoot column begins.
- Photo-Forum 28 (October/November): Portfolios: Richard Buckley, Murray Hedwig, Graham Kirk; Hill & Adamson.
- Photo-Forum 29 (December 1975/January 1976): Women’s Photography; Peter Peryer portfolio; School photographs review; Photo-Realism review.

1976

- Photo-Forum 30 (February/March): Allan McDonald; Edward Weston; News photography.
- Photo-Forum 31 (April/May): Robin Morrison; recent Australian photography.
- Photo-Forum 32 (June/July): John Maften Hope album (later identified as work by Northwood brothers); Anne Noble portfolio.
- Photo-Forum 33 (August/September): Peter Peryer portfolio; 36 Exposures review; Brian Brake: 40 Photographs review; New Photographers review.
- Photo-Forum 34 (October/November): Fragments of a World review; notes on Cole Weston’s visit; Mark Bentley Adams portfolio; Colin Parrish portfolio; Allan McDonald and Merylyn Tweedie exhibition review.
- Photo-Forum 35 (December 1976/January 1977): PhotoForum/Wellington; Photographic collections; Wisconsin Death Trip review; Exhibition reviews: Victoria Ginn, Ans Westra, Wellington Thomas Gordon Cody.

1977

- Photo-Forum 36 (February/March): Snaps Gallery interview part one; PhotoForum Museum exhibition review; Portraits by Anonymous Photographer; Photographer’s Gallery Erotic Photography review; Broadsheet Womanvision review.
- Photo-Forum 37 (April/May): Maori in Focus portfolio and review; Terence Pattie portfolio; Snaps Gallery interview, part two.
- Photo-Forum 38 (June/July): Christchurch portfolio; New Zealand Landscape exhibition review; Creative Camera Yearbook review.
- Photo-Forum 39 (August/September): Murray Cammick Flash Cars portfolio; Ex Camera exhibition review.
- Photo-Forum 40 (October/November): David Moore; Dennis Waugh.
- Photo-Forum 41 (December 1977/January 1978): Calendar Issue; Includes a detailed index covering all issues from February/March 1974 through to the Calendar Issue, compiled by Juliana Austen.

Photo-Forum 41 was the last A4 size Photo-Forum (designed by Karen Sarno-Woodroffe).

- PhotoForum Supplement 1 (Summer 1977/78): Brassaï; Peter Peryer portfolio; Tom Hutchins interview; Darius McCallum portfolio; Photo-montage; Peter H. Hughes’ Aspects of Photo Criticism.

1978

With issue 42 the magazine format is reduced and centres more on images. Photo-Forum Supplement, launched at the end of 1977, is in tabloid newsprint format to provide space for more discourse and news.

- Photo-Forum 42 (June): Auction report; Terry O’Connor and Clive Stone portfolios; 9 Carte-de-Visite Portraits.
- Photo-Forum Supplement 2 (Summer 78/79): reviews of Bill Brandt, Looking Back, de Meyer, Ernst Haas, Photomontage, Collection & care of historical photographs, Family of Children, Josef Sudek, Les Krims and William Eggleston books; Darius McCallum portfolio; Historical Show at Snaps and PhotoForum Galleries; Peter H. Hughes’ Aspects of Photo-Criticism part two; Peter Hannken: Debut.

1979

- Photo-Forum 43 (March): Max Oettli, In Transit; Edward Weston Nudes; Robin Morrison, Images of a House; Laurence Aberhart, Nineteen Photographs; PhotoArt ’78
- Photo-Forum 44 (August): Dr. A. C. Barker; Gillian Chaplin; Snaps and PhotoForum Gallery openings.
- PhotoForum Supplement 3 (Spring 1979): Les Cleveland: The Tyrees; Victoria Ginn portfolio; Art, Reality and Photography; Graham Kirk: In Search of the Taniwha comic.

1980

- Photo-Forum 45 (April): Portfolios by Lucien Rizos, Terry O’Connor, Terry Austin, Mark Bentley Adams; Mirrors and Windows: American Photography since 1960; J. W. Chapman-Taylor.
- Photo-Forum 46 (August): Paul Hewson; Bruce Attwell; Euan Cameron; Glenn Jowitt.
- Photo-Forum 47 (December): Bruce Connew; Peter Black; Janet Bayly; Dinah Bradley; Philip Ridge, Colour Photography: A Criticism (first colour portfolios).
- PhotoForum Supplement 4 (Winter): The Last Empire; Stuart MacKenzie; The Photographer and the Law; Kolorplaten; Paul Johns; Shirley Gruar: Debut.
- PhotoForum Supplement 5 (Spring): Megan Jenkinson; Women in New Zealand: An Exhibition; Ingeborg Tyssen; Gil Hanly; PhotoForum Gallery.
- PhotoForum Supplement 6 (Summer): Barney Brewster; The Suspect Image; Margaret Jane Dawson; A Little More Law; Politics and Photography; Tony Kellaway; Rod Wills; Dennis Ng; Shirley Gruar; Bruce Connew; Diane Quin; Celebration in History.

1981

From issue 48 the hyphen in the title was dropped.

- PhotoForum 48 (June): Jane Zusters; Clive Stone; On Collecting; Photograph as Icon; Don McCullin.
- PhotoForum 49 (October): Ken Browning; The Tour is Here; Robin Morrison; Political photography; Boyd Webb review.

1982

- PhotoForum 50 (January): John B. Turner, Fifty Issues–Thirteen Years; Miles Hargest; Peter Black: Fifty Photographs; Bruce Foster.
- Peter Black: Fifty Photographs catalogue for National Art Gallery exhibition.
- PhotoForum 51/52 (September): Anne Noble, The Wanganui. Published in collaboration with the Sarjeant Gallery, Wanganui, as a catalogue for the touring exhibition of the same name.
- PhotoForum 53 (December): The Way We Like It: A PhotoForum Diary of Contemporary New Zealand Photographers 1983: Mark Adams, Kapil Arn, Peter Black, Ken Browning, Peter Butler, Fiona Clark, Bruce Connew, Grant Douglas, Gil Hanly, Peter Hannken, Murray Hedwig, Gary Helm, Terry Hobin, Megan Jenkinson, John Johns, Mike Keeling, Tony Kellaway, Billy Lawry, Elizabeth Leyland, Gabrielle McKone, Mary Macpherson, John Miller, Juliet Nicholas, Terry O’Connor, Mike Perry, Peter Peryer, Jae Renaut, Geoffrey H. Short, Kees Sprengers, Sally Symes, John B. Turner, Anna Wilson, and Jennifer Urquhart.

1983

- PhotoForum 54 (February): Terry O’Connor and Katherine Findlay, All Good Children: Life in a New Zealand Children’s Health Camp.
- Quin, Diane (1983). The Way we like it: a PhotoForum diary of contemporary New Zealand photographers. Auckland: Photoforum. OCLC 17606304.

1984

- PhotoForum 55, (December): Sally Symes and Hana (Saana) Murray, The Te Hapua Project; Terence White; Views/Exposures and The New Color Photography reviews; Index to Photographic Art & History and New Zealand Photography magazines 1970–1973; Index to PhotoForum issues 42–55 and Photo-Forum Supplement 1–6. Compiled by Gail I. Hamblin.

From 1986 PhotoForum Newsletter was renamed PhotoForum ReView and changed to A5 format under new editors Janet Bayly and Athol McCredie.

=== 1987 ===
- Tweedie, Merylyn; Bosworth, Rhondda; Queen Elizabeth II Arts Council of New Zealand; PhotoForum Inc (1987). Six women photographers. Auckland, N.Z.: Published with assistance of the Queen Elizabeth II Arts Council of New Zealand and PhotoForum/Wellington. OCLC 154770341.
