= Luit Bieringa =

New Zealand art historian (1942–2022)

- Born: Luitjen Hendrik Bieringa; 10 September 1942; Groningen, Netherlands
- Died: 21 June 2022 (aged 79); Wellington, New Zealand
- Occupations: Art historian; art gallery director; museum director; film director
- Years active: 1971–2022

Luitjen Hendrik Bieringa (10 September 1942 – 21 June 2022) was a New Zealand art historian, art gallery director and documentary film maker. Bieringa was born in Groningen in the Netherlands and emigrated to New Zealand with his family in 1956.

== Museum career ==
He was Director of the Manawatū Art Gallery from 1971 until 1979. During this time he led the development of a new purpose-built art centre (the gallery had previously run out of a converted house). He later recalled:

"The main thing was to try and change the context in which the gallery operated to becoming a fully-fledged public institution that the community could relate to. We had people's support and if you think of the time, the early 70s, we'd only just moved out of the rugby, racing and beer environment."

In developing the new gallery, Bieringa focused on making the gallery "as accessible as possible to all the people of the Manawatu, whether their interest be in functional pottery or conceptual art." As one of only three staff at the museum Bieringa was hands-on with all aspects of opening and running the gallery. Influenced by a 1975-76 study trip to Europe funded by the New Zealand Arts Council, Bieringa adopted an approach that a reviewer at the time of opening said "set the way for an active, community based gallery that will meet the needs and offer more besides for the people of the Manawatu." During his time at the Manawatū Art Gallery (now part of the Te Manawa museum complex) Bieringa curated the landmark contemporary photography exhibition The Active Eye.

In 1979 Bieringa was appointed Director of the National Art Gallery of New Zealand. He held this position until 1989. He was a champion of photography in New Zealand, promoting it on a national level with major exhibitions at the National Art Gallery during his directorship, including New Zealand surveys and exhibitions of the work of Peter Black, Barbara Kruger, Cindy Sherman and Richard Misrach.

Bieringa also brought with him a focus on contemporary art backed up by a local and global exhibition program that included: America and Europe a Century of Modern Masters from the Thyssen-Bornemisza Collection (1980), Rita Angus (1982), Views/Exposures - Ten Contemporary New Zealand Photographers (1982), I will need words: Colin McCahon’s word and number paintings (1984), Content-context 1986, Para Matchitt: Huakina (1986), Wild Visionary Spectral: New German Art (1986), When Art Hits the Headlines (1987), Barbara Kruger (1988), Nobodies: Adventures of the Generic Figure (1989) and Neil Dawson: Site Works (1989). A number of these exhibitions were shown at the National Art Gallery's waterfront gallery Shed 11 the Temporary/Contemporary.

During Bieringa's time as Director a number of important purchases were added to the National Art Gallery collections including: Colin McCahon The Second Gate Series (1962) and Practical Religion (1968–70), Barbara Kruger Untitled (We are unsuitable for framing) (1985), Robert Mapplethorpe Y Portfolio (1977), Paratene Matchitt Te Wepu (1986) and Ralph Hotere Black Phoenix (1984–88).

From 2003 until 2012 Bieringa served on the board of The Physics Room.

== Film career ==
Bieringa's career as a film director began in 2006 with the release of Ans Westra – Private Journeys / Public Signposts, a documentary about the photographer Ans Westra produced by Bieringa's wife, Jan Bieringa. This director-producer partnership continued with the making of three more arts documentaries:

- The Man in the Hat (2009), about Wellington art dealer and gallery owner Peter McLeavey
- the heART of the matter (2016), documenting the establishment of a bicultural, arts-centred educational system in post-war New Zealand, led by Gordon Tovey
- Signed – Theo Schoon (2021), a portrait of New Zealand Dutch immigrant artist Theo Schoon
