= Martin Thompson (New Zealand artist) =

New Zealand artist (1956–2021)

Martin Thompson and one of his artworks, outside Brett McDowell Gallery in Dunedin in 2010.

Martin Thompson (January 1956 – 4 September 2021) was a New Zealand visual artist.

Thompson was born in Wellington in January 1956. (Note: Some sources give Thompson's date of birth as 1955.) A self-taught artist, he gained fame in the world of outsider art for his grid-like drawings, created from plane fractals. A mathematical savant, Thompson calculated the formula needed for each artwork, creating images in which repeated patterns overlay at decreasing sizes and scales, much in the way of a Sierpinski carpet.

Thompson described himself as "an old hippie", and with self-diagnosed Asperger syndrome, Thompson lived reclusively; his gifts in mathematics were balanced by difficulty to operate easily within social settings. He spent much of his time obsessively working on his art, in a seeming attempt to create order from the chaos of the universe. Rather than working in a studio, much of his work was created while sitting at the tables of local cafés, originally in his native Wellington, and later in Dunedin, where Thompson moved in 2007.

Thompson began his drawing career in 1980. Originally created using commercial A3 and A4 graph paper, hand-coloured in fine art pens, he expanded to include much larger works and – from about 2016 – coloured papers. Thompson was extremely particular about the pens which he used and the colours which they produce. Thompson's technique not only included the hand-marking of grids, but the deliberate physical cutting and pasting of areas of grid from one part of his works to another. Each finished work was created in two halves, a "positive" and a "negative" image of the mathematical formula which Thompson used, and as such all of his works have a two-by-one ratio in size.

In 2002, Thompson met with curator Brooke Anderson, who featured his work in a 2005 exhibition, "Obsessive Drawings", at the American Folk Art Museum in New York. This led to Thompson's work becoming known outside New Zealand for the first time, and he built up a small but significant international following. Within New Zealand, Thompson had numerous shows at City Gallery Wellington and regularly opened the exhibiting year at Brett McDowell Gallery in Dunedin every year since 2009. In 2015 he was the subject of a one-man show, "Sublime Worlds", at Dunedin Public Art Gallery. Outside New Zealand, Thompson's art has been shown at New York's Ricco Maresca Gallery and The Ian Potter Museum of Art, Melbourne.

Thompson died in Dunedin on 4 September 2021, aged 65.
