= Daisy Le Cren =

New Zealand artist (1881–1951)

Daisy Le Cren (née Roberts; 1881–1951) was a New Zealand painter.

== Biography ==
Le Cren was born in Timaru. She was a watercolour painter and gave lessons to a young Colin McCahon when he was growing up. After Le Cren's death, McCahon painted a series of artworks as a gift to her daughter, and McCahon's friend, Betty Curnow.

== Personal life ==
In 1903 she married Charles Le Cren in Ashburton. Their daughter Betty became a notable print-maker.
