= Shed 11 the Temporary/Contemporary =

Exhibition space in Wellington, New Zealand

Coordinates: 41.2836°S 174.7782°E

Shed 11 - the Temporary/Contemporary was an exhibition space on the Wellington waterfront programmed by the National Art Gallery of New Zealand between 1986 and 1992.

== History ==
In late 1985 Shed 11 on the Wellington waterfront was converted into an art gallery by the Ministry of Works and Development for the National Art Gallery. The building had been originally designed by William Ferguson as an industrial warehouse for the Wellington Harbour Board. When it was completed in 1905 it stood on the water's edge.

On 23 May 1986, the National Art Gallery's Director Luit Bieringa announced that Shed 11 was to be an off-site exhibition space where the Gallery could focus on contemporary art. The occupation of Shed 11 was Bieringa's response to the collapse of negotiations for a new National Art Gallery building in Wellington's Molesworth Street.

== Exhibitions ==
Shed 11's large uncluttered space created an opportunity to exhibit works that were too large for the National Art Gallery's own building in Buckle Street. It also offered a more fitting context for the contemporary work that was the focus of Bieringa's exhibition programme. Shed 11 opened with the exhibition Temporary/Contemporary featuring Chris Booth’s Ngā Rimu o Puketi, and a performance by the Auckland group From Scratch Pacific 3, 2, 1, Zero Part 2. For the next three years, Shed 11—the Temporary/Contemporary—mounted exhibitions curated by the National Art Gallery and presented touring shows.

== Exhibitions held at Shed 11 - the Temporary/Contemporary under Luit Bieringa's directorship ==
=== 1986 ===
- Wild Visionary Spectral: New German Art A touring show from Australia.
- Content/Context This review of contemporary New Zealand art was curated by Luit Bieringa. Art historian Michael Dunn described it at the time as the ‘...most ambitious survey of recent New Zealand art ever attempted in one space.’ The two part exhibition was shown from September 1986 to March 1987 and was accompanied by an extensive catalogue.

=== 1987 ===
- Matt Pine Selected Works 1965-85 An exhibition from the Sarjeant Gallery in Whanganui.
- Pauline Rhodes: Women View Women.
- Sighting References: Ciphers, Systems and Meaning in Recent Australian Visual Art, An exhibition from Artspace in Sydney curated by Gary Sangster.
- Ko Te Kimihanga. The first of a number of exhibitions featuring Maori art at Shed 11 that Louise Pether, the National Art Gallery’s Exhibitions Officer at the time, recalled Luit Bieringa and Paratene Matchitt had committed to. Pether described the exhibitions as, ‘an electric moment in New Zealand’s bi-cultural progress.’
- When Art Hits the Headlines: A Survey of Controversial Art In New Zealand. This exhibition traced instances of public contention over the presentation of art in New Zealand accompanied by a large format catalogue.

=== 1988 ===
- Barbara Kruger
- Taki Toru: Three Māori Artists. The featured artists were Selwyn Muru, Paratene Matchitt and Ralph Hotere. Large scale works included Matchitt's Te Wepu, a seven-by-two-metre assemblage in seven sections, and Hotere's Black Phoenix. This well-known sculpture was constructed from the prow and timbers of the fishing boat ‘Poitrel’ that Hotere had seen burning at its moorings near his studio. Art critic Mark Amery described Taki Toru as Shed 11's 'most significant exhibition..'.
- Advance Australia Painting. An exhibition toured by the Auckland Art Gallery

=== 1989 ===
- Cindy Sherman.
- Nobodies: Adventures of the Generic Figure. Robert Leonard’s first exhibition as curator at the National Art Gallery.

=== 1990 ===
- Kei te Anganui: At the Opposite. A Shed 11-filling site specific installation by the French artist Daniel Buren

== Controversy ==
Some critics found ‘the gallery’s strong interest in contemporary New Zealand work’, as reflected by exhibitions in Shed 11 such as Content/Context was not the core business of a national institution. ) The Chairman of the National Art Gallery, Hamish Keith, also believed that, ‘museums, national museums of art should be more about the past than about the immediate present and predictions of what might happen.’ Bieringa's commitment to the contemporary along with other disagreements over the form of what would become Te Papa Tongarewa resulted in his dismissal in 1989.

== Shed 11 post Bieringa ==
Managed as part of the restructured National Art Gallery, Shed 11 continued as a Museum of New Zealand exhibition space dedicated to contemporary art until 1992. Exhibitions during that period included: Nature Morte a collection of 105 works by the photographer Laurence Aberhart curated by Peter Ireland, Mexico: out of the Profane featuring six contemporary Mexican artists, the Crafts Council of New Zealand's exhibition Mau Mahara: Our Stories in Craft selected by Justine Olsen, John Parker and Cliff Whiting, Elements: Explorations: Oppositions - works from the Museum of New Zealand collection and an exhibition of the Australian artists Robin Stacey and Jackie Redgate.

In 2010 Shed 11 was leased long-term by the New Zealand Portrait Gallery and in 2024 it still functions as that Gallery's exhibition venue.
