= Spencer Digby =

New Zealand photographer (1901–1995)

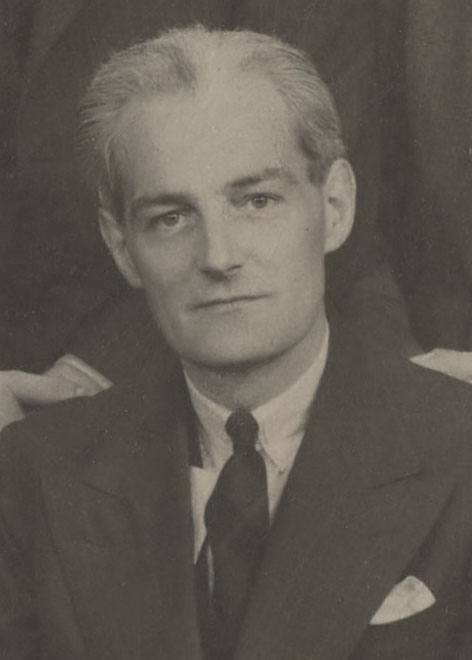
Digby in 1942

Spencer Harry Gilbee Digby (26 June 1901 – 22 June 1995) was a New Zealand photographer. He was born in Dagenham, Essex, England on 26 June 1901.

Digby trained under Richard Neville Speaight, a London-based society photographer.

Digby had a portrait studio on Lambton Quay in Wellington from the 1920s until 1960. Brian Brake worked as an assistant under Digby at his studio from 1945 until 1949.
