= Quasi (sculpture) =

Sculpture by Ronnie van Hout

Coordinates: 41°17′18.28″S 174°46′37.91″E

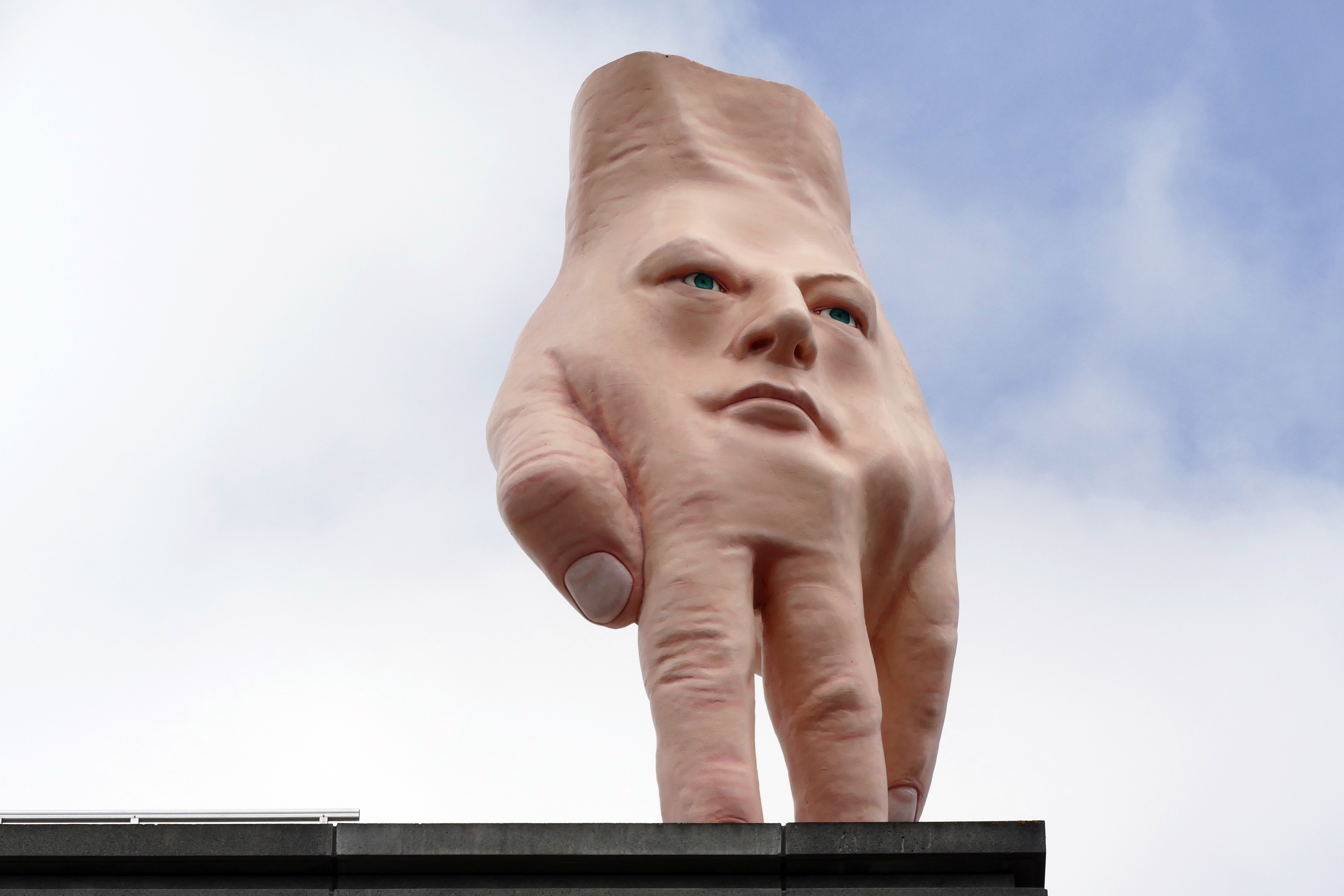
Quasi on top of Christchurch Art Gallery, 2017

Quasi is a sculpture by New Zealand artist Ronnie van Hout displayed on the roof of the Christchurch Art Gallery and then on the roof of City Gallery Wellington. It has drawn negative remarks, with responses to its installation on the roof of City Gallery Wellington ranging from "kinda creepy" and "really ugly" to "hideous" and "a Lovecraftian nightmare come to life".

== Description ==
The name Quasi is a play on the prefix quasi-, meaning 'almost', or 'not really', and also references Quasimodo, protagonist of the novel The Hunchback of Notre Dame, who was deformed and misshapen. Quasi is made from polystyrene, steel and resin and depicts van Hout's unsmiling face on the back of a disembodied, five-metre hand standing on its index and ring fingers. van Hout made the so-called "partial self-portrait" for his hometown of Christchurch after the 2011 Christchurch earthquake, and it was eventually installed on the roof of the Christchurch Art Gallery on 9 June 2016 where it stayed for almost three years until 26 February 2019. On 19 August 2019, it was moved to the roof of City Gallery Wellington where it remained until November 2024. Quasi was then relocated to Australia. On 3 June 2025, Quasi was installed on the roof of the Henry Jones Hotel in Hobart, Tasmania, as part of that city's Dark MoFo festival.

== Reception ==
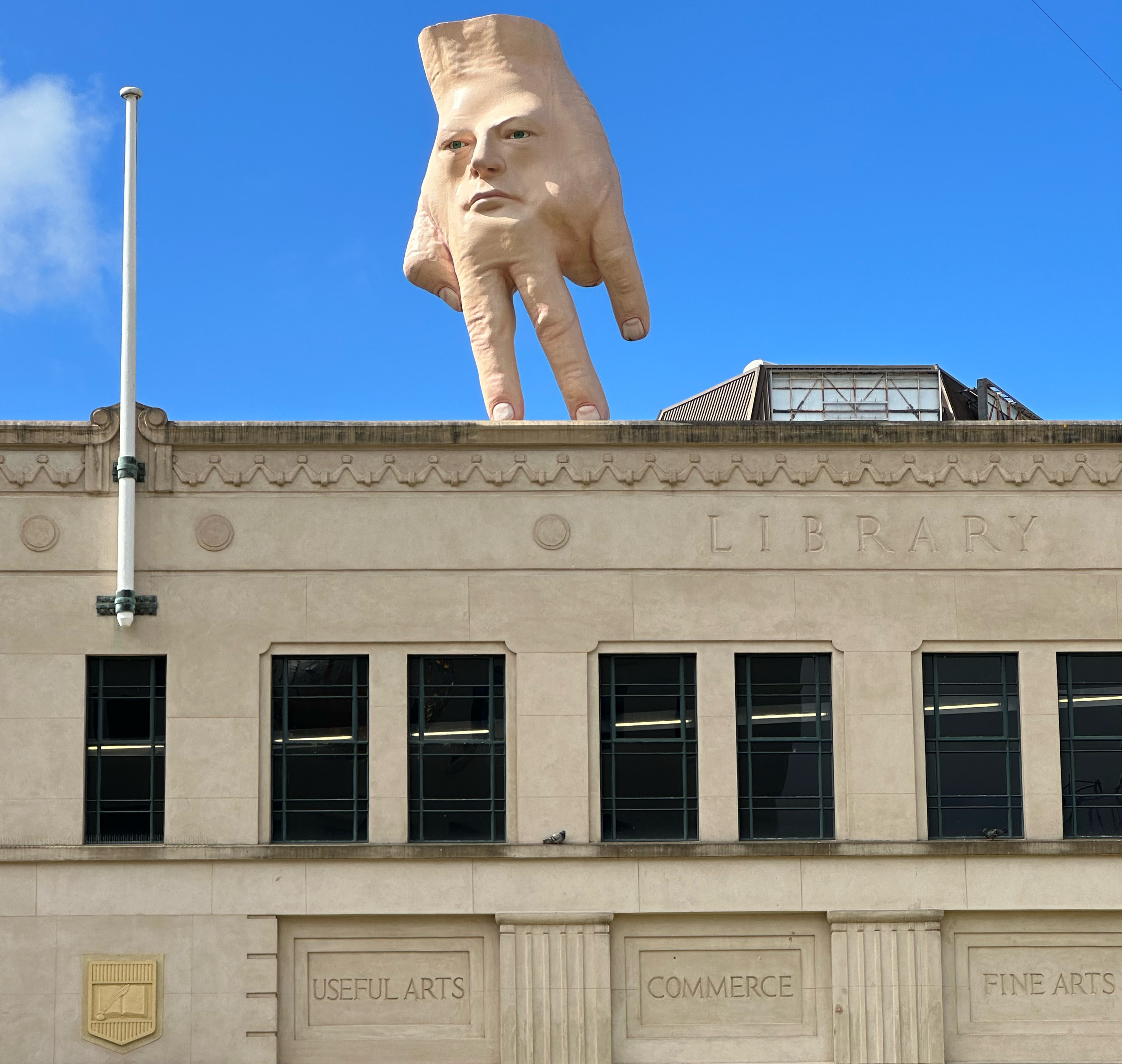
Quasi on top of the City Gallery Wellington.

The sculpture has drawn mixed reactions from the public, with many on social media describing Quasi as "hideous" and "monstrous" and others saying they had "warmed to it". On 25 October 2016, New Zealand art critic Warren Feeny penned a list entitled "Ten reasons why Christchurch Art Gallery's Quasi must go", listing the reasons why he felt Quasi should be removed from its then perch on top of the Christchurch Art Gallery, including "Quasi is a one-line joke", where he explained that the sculpture was a bit of "fun and mischief" but not much else, and "Quasi is in the wrong place", where he expresses his opinion that, had Quasi been at ground level at a more human scale, it would've "made Quasi a more informal and personal experience".
