= Betty Curnow =

New Zealand artist (1911–2005)

- Born: Betty Jamaux Le Cren; 31 October 1911; Timaru, New Zealand
- Died: 24 September 2005 (aged 93); Auckland, New Zealand
- Known for: Painting and print making
- Spouse: Allen Curnow (m. 1936; div. 1965)
- Relatives: Wystan Curnow (son)

Elizabeth Jamaux Curnow (née Le Cren; 31 October 1911 – 24 September 2005), commonly known as Betty Curnow, was a New Zealand artist and the subject of the iconic Portrait of Betty Curnow by Rita Angus.

== Background ==
Born in Timaru, New Zealand, Curnow was the daughter of Charles John Le Cren and Daisy Le Cren (née Roberts) who was a watercolour artist. Le Cren was also an early teacher of Colin McCahon who, when she died, gifted her daughter Betty Curnow a set of paintings in commemoration of her mother and her influence on him at a young age. Betty married Allen Curnow at St Mary's Church, Timaru, on 26 August 1936. The Curnows were social and intellectual magnets for the Christchurch art scene in the 1930s and 1940s. As the mother of three children Betty Curnow's time was limited but she was able to attend the Christchurch School of Art intermittently studying under A.J. Roe, the first person in New Zealand to use mezzotint, who gave Curnow, primarily a painter at the time, a life-long interest in graphic art. She was also closely involved with the Canterbury Society of Arts and became a close friend and advisor to many significant Christchurch artists including Rita Angus, Leo Bensemann, Douglas MacDiarmid and Evelyn Page. Artist and writer Vita Cochrane has described her as ‘wife, mother and intellectual’ The year after her marriage Betty Curnow became involved in sponsoring the left wing pacifist publication Woman Today. Other supporters included Margaret Anderson (later Margaret Frankel) and Rita Angus. The magazine had reached a circulation of around 2,500 although it folded at the start of the Second World War. Christchurch in the late thirties was known as the country's creative centre and the centre of that centre was Leo Bensemann's home at 97 Cambridge Terrace. It served as a meeting place for art activists like Rita Angus who shared the house with Bensemann for some time, along with regular visitors like Betty and Allen Curnow, Olivia Spencer Bower, Louise Henderson and poet Denis Glover. As art historian Peter Simpson has noted, with Angus and Bensemann working in such close proximity their interests began to merge and they repeatedly began to draw and paint not only each other but Lawrence Baigent and the numerous visitors to the studios as well.

== The Portrait of Betty Curnow ==
In 1942 Betty Curnow became the subject of one of Rita Angus's most well-known paintings, Portrait of Betty Curnow. Angus, who at that time was Rita Cook, and Curnow had become close friends and in 1939 Angus stayed with the Curnows for a time. During the visit Angus began a number of pencil studies of Betty Curnow that developed into the oil painting. Curnow and Angus collaborated on the painting, selecting clothing and objects that best symbolised the threads of Curnow's life as a daughter, wife and mother. They also discussed the portrait as a sign of the strength women were gaining as they took up new jobs and responsibilities as a result of the war. Betty Curnow is seen holding a pair of blue pants that belonged to her son Wystan. Himself a prominent poet, art critic, writer and curator, Wystan Curnow remembers Angus living with them and has related how the Mexican-themed jacket worn by his mother in the portrait was fashioned from two aprons purchased at Woolworths and later again converted by Curnow into a bathing suit. Curnow sits in her grandmother's chair with a photo of her father on the wall behind her. The two pictures behind Curnow are the print Autumn by Bruegel and a watercolour by Angus which were intended to stand in for the Old World and the New. Curnow recalled later that they had seen the Bruegel in an exhibition from the collection of a German refugee who had fled to New Zealand. In the catalogue of Angus's first retrospective art writer and curator Ron Brownson noted of the portrait, ‘Nothing represented is extraneous detail. Betty Curnow is a representative of her generation because she ties the connections between her own past, present and future family by being at its centre. The art historian and gallery director Peter Tomory quite accurately described the painting as, ‘the portrait of a century’. On completing the painting Angus gifted it to the Curnows in thanks for their hospitality and kindness while she had stayed with them. Angus first exhibited her portrait of Curnow in the 1943 Group Show: Rita Cook catalogue number five, Portrait.

In 1954 another friend painted Curnow's portrait in a very different style. Louise Henderson presented Curnow's ‘French side’ a glamorous alternative to Angus's more austere presentation. As art writer Serina Bently commented, ‘Henderson’s portrait is stripped back, presenting an exotic and confident cosmopolitan woman with minimal attributes of flower, cigarette and shawl. She is strong, independent, and seductive.

== Art career and life ==
In 1950 Curnow and her husband Allen left Christchurch for Auckland’s Takapuna, overlooking Shoal Bay. Encouraged by recently emigrated Dutch printmaker Kees Hos, Curnow herself was drawn to the medium noting, ‘I like the transparency of it and the clearness of the edge and surfaces. It’s a very disciplined art.’ By 1955 Curnow had begun attending night classes in printing and began her first experiments of applying the printing ink directly onto the paper and two years later had her first of many exhibitions using this technique. Curnow used a laundry wringer set up in her dining room to act as a press, the dining room table becoming covered in recently printed images. Curnow said "we eat off our laps now". With her interests in the arts Curnow was able to make a number of connections that proved valuable. She mentioned to her friend the director and producer John O’Shea how much she had enjoyed the play Lest We Resemble by Auckland writer John Graham and observed what a good film it would make. O’Shea picked up on the idea for his second feature Runaway (1962). In 1965 Betty and Allen Curnow's marriage was dissolved. Curnow now focussed on new printing techniques and in 1968 spent time in Wellington working in engraving and aquatint with John Drawbridge. She also spent time in Australia looking at prints and other art forms. although by 1979 she had returned to painting. Betty Curnow died on 24 September 2005 in Auckland.

== Selected exhibitions ==
1958

- Betty Curnow Hereford street coffee lounge. The critic J.N.K. said of the work, (June) ‘Betty Curnow…shows herself as a colourist of some talent and individuality in her paintings.’

1960

- Hays Limited Art Competition (group). Curnow's son Wystan also exhibited.

1964

- The Group 64.

1965–1969

- New Zealand Academy of Fine Arts Annual Exhibitions (group).

1966

- Hays Limited Art Competition (Hay's Prize) (group).

1968

- Canterbury Society of Arts Gallery, Christchurch.
- 50 Prints Central Gallery (group) Wellington.

1974

- Print Council of New Zealand: Fifth Touring Exhibition. (group) Wairarapa Arts Centre, Masterton (toured).

1983

- Betty Curnow: Paintings Devonport Library, Auckland.

1984

- My Country’ South Island Hills: Paintings by Betty Curnow New Vision Gallery, Auckland.

1987

- Betty Curnow C.S.A. Gallery, Christchurch. Paintings.

1993

- Betty Curnow: Sixty Years Mairangi Arts Centre, Auckland.

== Collections ==
Works by Curnow are held in:

Aratoi Wairarapa Museum of Art and History,

Auckland Art Gallery

Christchurch Art Gallery

National Gallery of Australia

Sarjeant Gallery, Whanganui
