= Anne Noble =

New Zealand photographer

Anne Noble ONZM
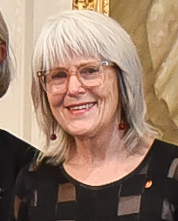
- Noble in 2020
- Born: Anne Lysbeth Noble; 1954 (age 71–72); Whanganui, New Zealand
- Known for: Photography
- Spouse: John Gray

Academic background
- Education: Elam School of Fine Arts
- Thesis: Some different cultural attitudes to photographs and their use in New Zealand (1984)

Anne Lysbeth Noble ONZM (born 1954) is a New Zealand photographer and Distinguished Professor of Fine Art (Photography) at Massey University's College of Creative Arts. Her work includes series of photographs examining Antarctica, her own daughter's mouth, and our relationship with nature.

== Early life and education ==
Born in Whanganui in 1954, Noble's father and grandfather were both amateur photographers, and she was gifted her first camera, an Agfa Clack, by her father when she was around 10 years old. Noble attended high school at the Roman Catholic girls' college, Erskine College, in Island Bay, Wellington, and Wanganui Girls' College. She completed a MFA Honours (1st class) at the Elam School of Fine Arts in 1983. Her master's thesis was titled Some different cultural attitudes to photographs and their use in New Zealand.

== Work ==
Noble's approach to her work involves "prolonged observation and attentive watching". She is known for working in photographic series. Her first major exhibition, The Wanganui, opened at the Sarjeant Gallery in 1982 and toured to the Museum of New Zealand Te Papa Tongarewa, Auckland, Hamilton and Te Manawa in Palmerston North. Writer Sheridan Keith described these works as "a series of images of immense spirituality, serenity and intensity of feeling".

In The Presence Of Angels – Photographs Of The Contemplative Life (1988–1990) is a series of photographs documenting life inside a London convent. Noble lived with the Benedictine nuns in the silent order for an extended period.

In My Father’s Garden is a series of photographs that follow the artist's father's death, while the Hidden Lives series capture the lives of elderly intellectually disabled people and their carers.

The series Ruby’s Room (1998–2007) features close-up images of the photographer's daughter's mouth. The artist says that many of the best childhood moments go unrecorded, and that many of these "relate to pleasures and play around the mouth, moments of defiance and triumph, like managing to blow a really good bubble with bubble gum ... I wanted to magnify the colour, the spontaneity, the life, the fun and play, and all the things that I enjoyed as a mother." In 2010 the Museum of New Zealand Te Papa Tongarewa acquired 30 of the works from the series as a boxed portfolio, describing them as "standing alongside her Antarctic work [as] Anne Noble's major body of photography from the 2000s".

In 2001 the Dunedin Public Art Gallery staged a major retrospective of Noble's work, Anne Noble: States of Grace, which toured to City Gallery Wellington and the Auckland Art Gallery.

Since 2001, Noble has been researching and visiting the Antarctic, and has produced several series of works on this subject, including Antarctica Iceblink and Antarctica Whiteout. These works are often concerned with how Antarctica has been portrayed in popular perceptions, exploring how we have come to see Antarctica as "a glistening white world where penguins frolic and snowflakes fall".

Noble's work has investigated the honeybee and its place in our world, research instigated by her time on a Fulbright fellowship based at Columbia College in Chicago as their international artist in residence. Her first exhibition on this subject, Nature Study, was held at Bartley+Company in Wellington in 2015. Writing about these new works, art historian Priscilla Pitts noted:

For several years Noble has focused her camera on Antarctica, 'the last great wilderness on earth', intractable despite our efforts to document and understand it, yet fragile and susceptible to our actions elsewhere on the planet. Noble's attention to the plight of bees arises from the same concern for the natural environment and what we are doing to it. In these new works there is a shift from the ostensibly documentary mode of the Antarctic images towards a more overtly poetic exploration of her subject, something that is familiar from much of her earlier work.

Noble's work on bees Conversātiō: in the company of bees was published in 2021.

== Awards and recognitions ==
Noble has held several artist residencies, including the Tylee Cottage Residency in 1990, Artist in Residence at the University of Canterbury in 1993, and the Antarctic Arts Fellowship in 2001 and 2009.

She was awarded the US National Science Foundation Artists and Writers Award in 2008 and a Massey University Research Medal in 2009. In 2015 Noble won the 31st Higashikawa Overseas Photographer Award.

In 2000 she was appointed an Arts Foundation Laureate. Then in the 2003 Queen's Birthday Honours, Noble was appointed an Officer of the New Zealand Order of Merit, for services to photography. In 2009 she received an Arts Foundation of New Zealand Laureate award. In 2013 Massey University awarded Noble the title of Distinguished Professor.

== Personal life ==
Noble is married to architect and academic John Gray, one of the designers of the City to Sea Bridge alongside Rewi Thompson and Paratene Matchitt.

== Publications ==
- Noble, Anne (1982). The Wanganui: photographs of a river. Auckland [N.Z.]: Photoforum
- Noble, Anne (1989). In the presence of angels photographs of the contemplative life. Wanganui [N.Z]: Sarjeant Gallery
- Noble, Anne; Paton, Justin; Kennedy, Anne; Wevers, Lydia (2001). Anne Noble: states of grace. Paton, Justin., Kennedy, Anne, Wevers, Lydia. Dunedin, New Zealand: Dunedin Public Art Gallery. ISBN 0-86473-425-5. OCLC 50659639.
- Noble, Anne; Porter, Gwynneth; Wedde, Ian (2011). Anne Noble: ice blink. Auckland, N.Z.: Clouds. ISBN 978-0-9864628-5-6. OCLC 776689471.
- Noble, Anne (2011). Spoolhenge Antarctica. Plymouth, Devon: University of Plymouth Press. ISBN 9781841022826.
- Manhire, Bill; Noble, Anne; Meehan, Norman; Griffin, Hannah (2012). These Rough Notes. Wellington [N.Z.]: Victoria University Press. ISBN 978-0-86473-831-8.
- Noble, Anne; Porter, Gwynneth; Jones, Lloyd; Panek, Richard (2014). The last road. Auckland, NZ: Clouds. ISBN 978-0-9876593-0-9. OCLC 879151609.
- Noble, Anne (2017). No vertical song. [Fitzroy, Melbourne]: Centre for Contemporary Photography. ISBN 978-0-9946229-2-1. OCLC 999611632.
- Noble, Anne; Stanhope, Zara; Brown, Anna (2021). Conversātiō: in the company of bees. Auckland: Massey University Press. ISBN 9780995140752
