= Fiona Clark (photographer) =

New Zealand photographer (born 1954)

- Born: Fiona Mary Clark; 1954 (age 71–72); Inglewood, New Zealand
- Education: Elam School of Fine Arts
- Known for: Photography

Fiona Mary Clark (born 1954) is a New Zealand social documentary photographer, one of the first photographers to document New Zealand's LGBT scene.

== Early life and education ==
Fiona Clark was born in Inglewood in 1954 and attended Inglewood High School, which she noted to have not felt that she fit in, from an early age. Clark also said that her time at Inglewood High School taught her about survival as a young woman, citing the violence and the two murders that occurred there.

Clark's family were farmers, but she has said they were not "typical farmers". Her brothers were arrested for protesting against the Vietnam War and encouraged her and her siblings to attend university. She notes having a fascination with New Zealand woman Amy Bock, after her Grandfather shared her story.

At the age of 16, Clark moved to Auckland to attend the Elam School of Fine Arts. She was initially enrolled in performing arts, but moved into the photography department in her third year in 1974. In 1975, Clark moved to Tikorangi, where she lives in a decommissioned dairy factory.

== Career ==
=== Queer culture ===
Clark's work is predominantly social documentary photography, and she was one of the first photographers to cover New Zealand's LGBTQ+ scene. She was notable in documenting parts of the queer community in the 1970s and 1980s, on Auckland's Karangahape Road. This included photographing drag culture and queer nightlife in clubs such as the KG Club, Mojo's and Las Vegas. Clark also documented the emerging punk subculture in New Zealand. Some of her most notable series of works related to queer culture are, Go Girl and Living with HIV.

In 2002, in reflection of the exhibition The Active Eye, Clark published the book Go Girl and exhibited a collection of photographs at the Govett-Brewster Art Gallery.

=== Censorship ===
In 1975, Clark's work faced censorship and considerable public outcry, with two of her photographs being removed from the survey exhibition, The Active Eye. The images were taken during a Pride week Dance Party in 1974 at the Auckland University Café and depicted two, as described by New Zealand newspapers at the time, 'transvestites' The images were paired with provocative hand written captions well known drag performer of the time, Tracy Karl.

As part of the backlash to the images, the Auckland City Gallery had to close briefly due the criticisms, 200 people complained to the Auckland Council over the photographs, and a private complaint was made to the police alleging public indecency. Some of the photographs went missing in 1976 from the Auckland City Gallery before the police could review them - in 2017 Clark said that still does not know what happened to them.

The fall out of this controversy had an impact on her wider work, with some art dealers saying that they would refuse to handle her photography and Kodak acknowledging that they would not develop her photographs that were considered obscene.

=== Environmental photography ===
From 1979 to 1982, when Clark was living in Waitara, she created a series of 104 photographs titled Te Iwi o Te Wāhi Kore. The phrase translates to 'the people with nothing' and addresses the historical confiscation of iwi land across the Mount Taranaki coastline.

The photographs became an important political tool and were presented numerous times in the early 1980s, most significantly for Motunui – Waitara Treaty of Waitangi Claim (Wai-6) to assert iwi as kaitiaki of their ancestral land. Clark's images were used to show the magnificence of the area and present kai moana as a taonga that brings pride and prestige to the community as one of their last remaining culturally significant environmental assets. Te Iwi o Te Wāhi Kore was exhibited again in 2017 at the Dowse Art Museum in Lower Hutt.

In 2021 a documentary about Clark was made by Lula Cucchiara about Clark's work.

== Personal life ==
Clark is a lesbian. In an interview she said:

I used to have a saying on my wall: ‘Once I was a tomboy and now I’m a full-grown lesbian.’ One day I crossed out the last half and wrote ‘but now I’m queer’. Even that label will probably change.

Clark was friends with, and used to photograph often, Carmen Rupe who called her "my photographer Fiona." Rupe used some of these photos for her Christmas and business cards.

In 1977 Clark, aged 23, was involved in a motorcycle crash which broke her jaw and shattered many bones in her face, leaving her with an inverted eye.

== Exhibitions ==
- 1975, The Active Eye, Manawatu Art Gallery, Palmerston North
- 1982, Body Building, Robert McDougall Art Gallery
- 2002, Go Girl, Govett-Brewster Gallery
- 2009, Amy Bock, South Otago Museum, Otago
- 2016, Niccole Duval, Michael Lett
- 2016, For Fantastic Carmen, Artspace NZ, Auckland
- 2016, For Pink Pussycat Club, Artspace NZ, Auckland
- 2016, SIART Biennale, Museo National de Arte La Paz, Bolivia
- 2016–7, All Lines Converge, Govett-Brewster Art Gallery (with L. Budd, and et al.)
- 2017, Te iwi o te wahi kore, Dowse Art Museum, Lower Hutt

== Awards ==
- 1980: Queen Elizabeth II Arts Council grant to photograph the "Mr Olympia" body building contest in Sydney
- 2023: Arts Foundation of New Zealand Laureate Award

== Films ==
- Fiona Clark: Unafraid (2021) – documentary, directed by Lula Cucchiara
