= Brian Brake =

New Zealand photographer (1927–1988)

Brian Brake OBE
- Born: 27 June 1927; Wellington, New Zealand
- Died: 4 August 1988 (aged 61); Titirangi, Auckland, New Zealand.
- Occupation: Photographer

John Brian Brake OBE (27 June 1927 – 4 August 1988) was a photographer from New Zealand. He is best known for his 1955 photographs of Pablo Picasso at a bullfight, his 1957 and 1959 series of China, and his 1960 Monsoon series of India.

== Early life (1927–1945) ==
Born in Wellington, New Zealand, Brake was the adopted son of John (Jack) Samuel Brake and his wife Jennie Brake (née Chiplin). He was raised initially at Doyleston, before his father moved the family to Arthur's Pass, where his father owned the general store, and Christchurch, where he attended Christchurch Boys' High School. His early interest in photography was inspired by his aunt Isabel Brake, who exhibited with the Christchurch Photographic Society, and several of his older cousins.

== Early career in New Zealand (1945–1954) ==
Brake trained with a portrait photographer from Wellington, Spencer Digby, in 1945. Three years later, he joined Government filmmaking body the National Film Unit as an assistant cameraman. Brake worked on 17 films at the Unit, mostly as a cameraman, occasionally as a director. Though Brake's skills with studio lighting were utilised, the majority of his work involved the NFU's heavy diet of scenic shorts, including a series of 'snow' films Brake filmed in the Southern Alps. Snows of Aorangi, one of three NFU films Brake directed, was the first New Zealand film nominated for an Academy Award, in the Best Short Subject (Live Action) category in 1958. It was beaten to the Oscar by James Algar's nature film Grand Canyon.

== Move to London (1954–1959) ==
Brake left New Zealand for London in 1954. In 1955, he met Ernst Haas and Henri Cartier-Bresson, members of the photo agency Magnum Photos. This led to his acceptance as a nominee member in the same year, and full membership in 1957. He remained a Magnum photographer until 1967. Working as a freelance photographer affiliated with Magnum, he traveled extensively throughout Europe, Africa, and Asia taking photographs that were published in Life, Paris Match, and National Geographic. In the mid-1960s, when he began working more exclusively for Life magazine.

Brake is known for his 1957 and 1959 coverage of China. He was allowed an unusual level of access, and images of China in the 1950s are rare. Brake was the only Western photo journalist to document the 10th anniversary of the People's Republic of China.

Brake is also known for his 1955 photographs of Pablo Picasso at a bullfight.

== Monsoon (1960) ==
His Monsoon series of photographs taken in India during 1960 were published internationally in magazines including Life, Queen and Paris Match. Brake used Aparna Das Gupta (now Aparna Sen) as the model for what was to become one of his best known photographs from the Monsoon series — a shot of a girl holding her face to the first drops of monsoon rain. The shoot was set up on a Kolkata rooftop with a ladder and a watering can. Sen describes the shoot:

He took me up to the terrace, had me wear a red sari in the way a village girl does, and asked me to wear a green stud in my nose.

To be helpful, I said let me wear a red one to match, and he said no — he was so decisive, rather brusque — I think a green one. It was stuck to my nose with glue, because my nose wasn't pierced.

Someone had a large watering can, and they poured water over me. It was really a very simple affair. It took maybe half an hour.

The Monsoon series significantly increased Brake's fame.

== Later work (1960–1988) ==
In 1960, Brake also photographed in New Zealand. The images were published in the best-selling book New Zealand, Gift of the Sea (1963). The book remained in print for over a decade and was republished in an entirely new format and with different images, but the same title, in 1990.

Brake made his home base in Hong Kong starting in 1962.

In 1965, Nigel Cameron and Brake published Peking: A Tale of Three Cities, which was dedicated to Brake's father, John Brake. In 1967, Brake and William Warren were commissioned by James Thompson to produce The House on the Klong, which was first published after the mysterious disappearance of silk merchant and former CIA agent James Thompson, in January 1968. This book was the first of many on craft and art objects. In the late 1960s, Brake primarily produced museum-style books on Asian artworks. Later titles on craft and art objects include The Sculpture of Thailand (1972), Legend and Reality: Early Ceramics from South-East Asia (1977), Art of the Pacific (1979), and, in collaboration with Doreen Blumhardt, Craft New Zealand: The Art of the Craftsman (1981).

In 1970, Brake founded Zodiac Films in Hong Kong and made documentary films in Indonesia until 1976.

In 1976, he moved from Hong Kong back to New Zealand and began to photograph New Zealand in addition to his prior work Asia. He was commissioned by Time-Life in the 1970s to photograph Sydney and Hong Kong for a book series on major cities.

He commissioned an East Asian influenced architectural award-winning house designed by Ron Sang on Titirangi's Scenic Drive, in the Waitākere Ranges to the west of Auckland; the house has a Category 1 Heritage New Zealand rating. He lived there with his life partner, Wai-man Lau, for the remainder of his life, although he continued to accept freelance assignments abroad. In 1985 he helped establish the New Zealand Centre for Photography.

In the 1981 Queen's Birthday Honours, Brake was appointed an Officer of the Order of the British Empire, for services to photography.

Brake died at Titirangi of a heart attack in 1988.

== Legacy ==
Brake was careful to retain his negatives and transparencies, as well as copyright, wherever possible. His entire collection of photographs is now housed at the Museum of New Zealand Te Papa Tongarewa. The Museum showed his China work in a 1995 exhibition, Brian Brake: China, the 1950s (with an accompanying book of the same title), and in 1998, Monsoon: Brian Brake's Images of India. Images from this series were published independently in 2007 as Monsoon. In 2010, the Museum mounted a major retrospective exhibition of his work, Brian Brake: Lens on the World, again with a fully illustrated catalogue.
