= Salla Tykkä =

Finnish artist

Salla Tykkä (born 1973) is a Finnish artist. She was born in Helsinki, Finland, where she lives and works today. Tykkä graduated from the Academy of Fine Arts 2003. She has been working with photography, video and film since 1996, and she had her first solo show in 1997.
