= James Bragge =

New Zealand and English photographer

- Born: 1833; South Shields, County Durham, England
- Died: 1908 (aged 74–75); Wellington
- Occupation: Photographer
- Known for: Capturing a record of New Zealand during a period of the countries development

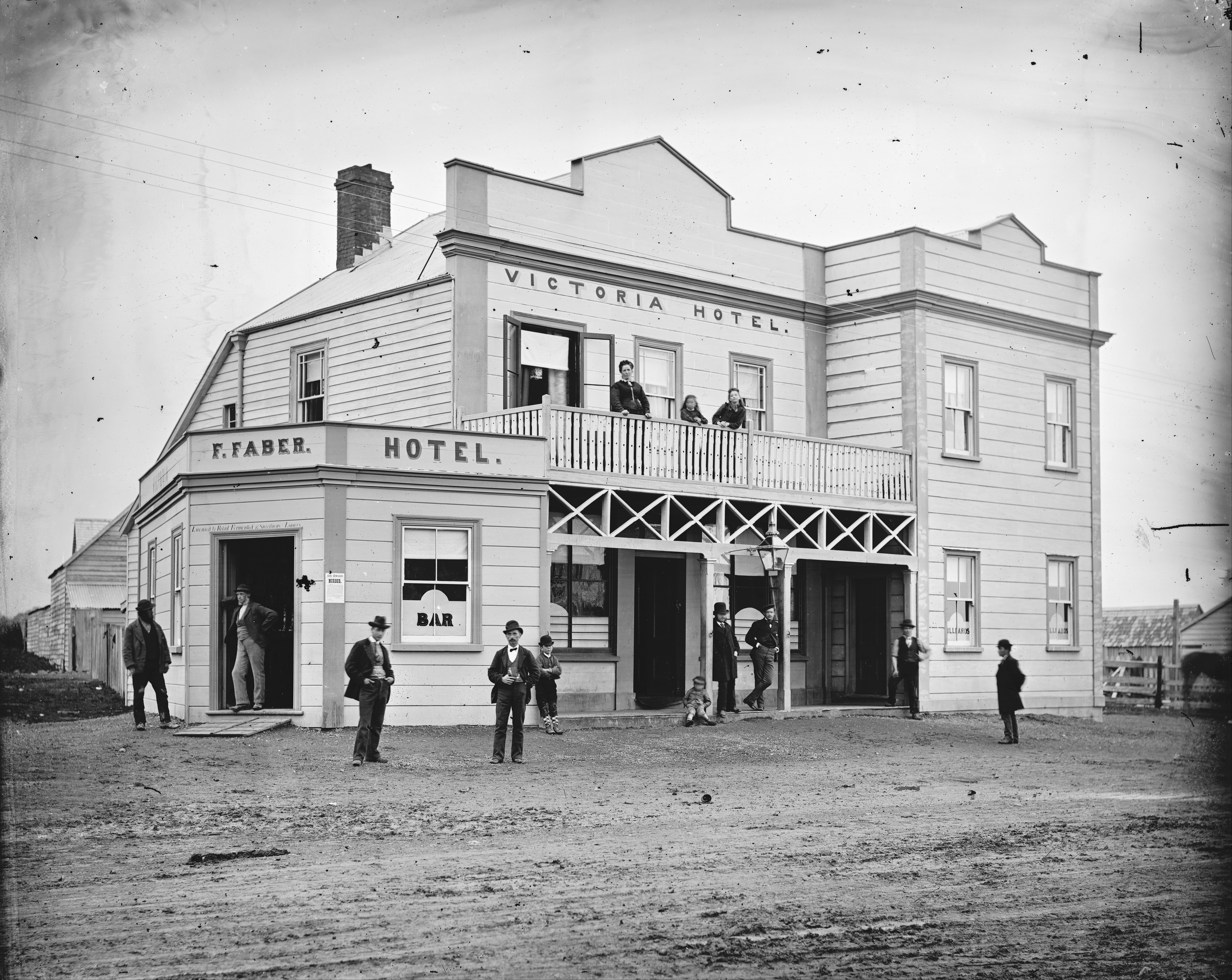
James Bragge - Victoria Hotel - Google Art Project

James Bragge (1833–1908) was a photographer in New Zealand during the mid-to-late 19th century. Born in England, he moved to New Zealand when he was in his thirties. He opened a photography studio and also took photographs on travels around the country. The product of these serve as a record of the development of the country at this time.

== Early life ==
According to Bragge's death certificate, he was born in 1833, in South Shields, County Durham, England. His father, also called James, worked as an architect. His mother’s name was Harriett (née Wigglesworth). In 1854, at the age of 21, James Bragge Jr. married Elizabeth Ann Fish. They had two daughters. He remarried in 1900, at the age of 67, to Lydia Segus Banfield, who bore him a further daughter.

== Move to New Zealand ==
Little more is known of Bragge, but we do know that he came to New Zealand in 1865. Within a short while he had opened a photographic studio in Manners Street, Wellington. This studio was advertised as "The New Zealand Academy of Photographic Art". During his time in New Zealand, Bragge made at least two trips over the Rimutaka Range to the Wairarapa, and the Manawatū District. In 1871, he travelled with his family to Auckland. By 1879, he had returned to Wellington, and opened a studio in Lambton Quay which operated until the 1890s. The Wellington City Council commissioned Bragge to take various photographs of Wellington, for show at the Sydney International Exhibition and Melbourne International Exhibition in 1880. He died in Wellington on 17 July 1908.

== Career as a photographer ==
In his early life Bragge's profession was that of a cabinetmaker. It was only with the advancement in technology that during the early sixties he was able to engage in photography. It is difficult to ascertain how he developed his skills in photography. Similar to many photographers, he began as a studio portrait photographer. He later travelled around the lower North Island, with his darkroom contained in a horse-drawn carriage. He travelled to small towns and took photos of the locations, some including the local people. It appears that he made postcards from the photos, and sold them to the townsfolk. They in turn would send these postcards to their relative in England, as a kind-of curio of what New Zealand was like. His photographic skill is very evident in the many photos he took during the Wairarapa expeditions. William Main states in his book, Bragge's Wellington and the Wairarapa, "Street scenes of 1869 are not rare, but those filled with people are." This may explain the interest in Bragge's photographs. A wide variety of his photos included people, some even believed to be of Bragge himself.

"It was 1876 when Bragge first hitched a mobile darkroom to a horse, and rode northwards toward the Wairarapa, taking photos along the way. These show places like Danniverke, Norsewood and Eketahuna, where huge tracts of land were being cleared, and roads bridges and settlements were being built. Bragge's photos were immediately popular with Wellington audiences, who saw them as representing progress. And today, they’re valuable records of settlement process."
