= City Gallery Wellington =

Art gallery in Wellington, New Zealand

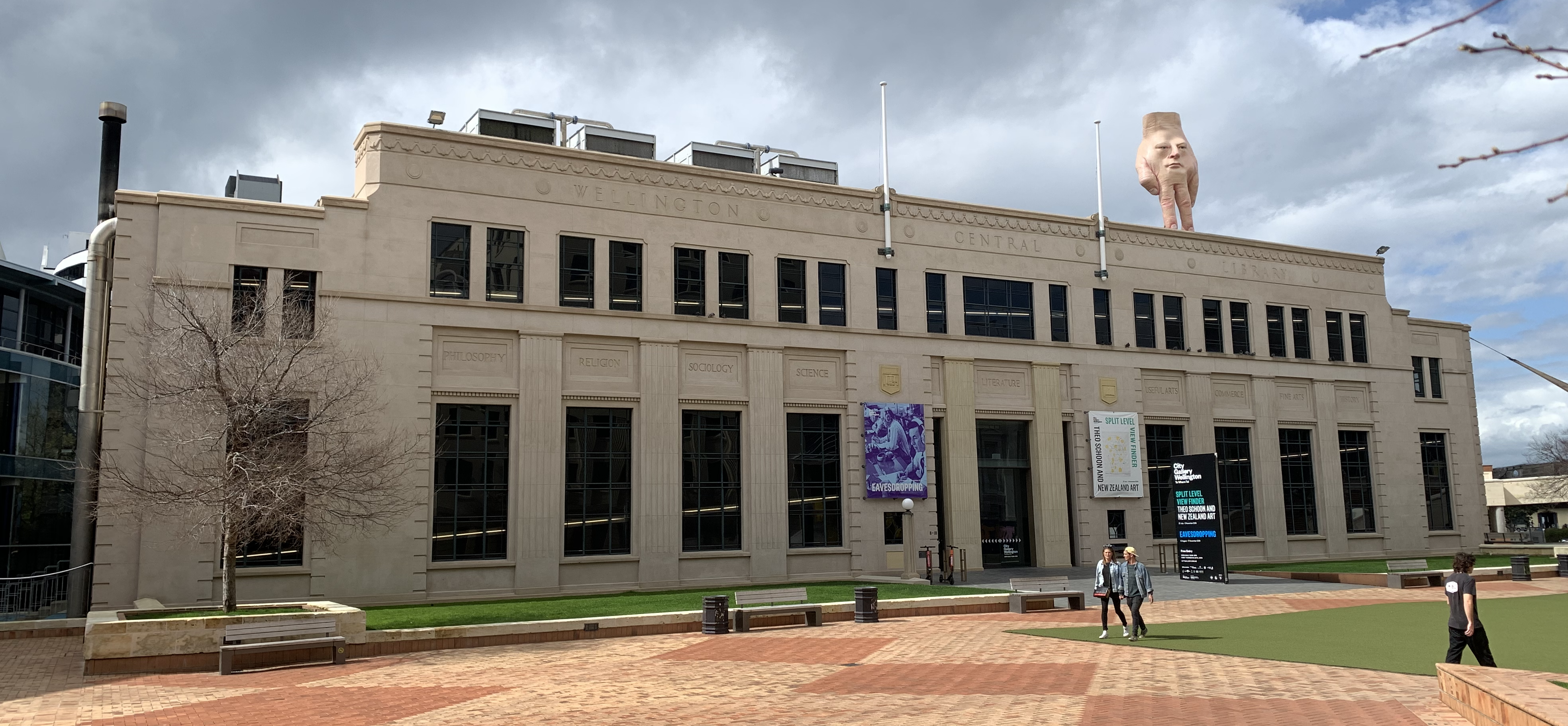
- Established: 1980 (46 years ago)
- Types: art gallery
- Location: Wellington Central Library (Former)
- Country: New Zealand
- Coordinates: 41°17′18″S 174°46′38″E

Wellington Central Library (Former) Building
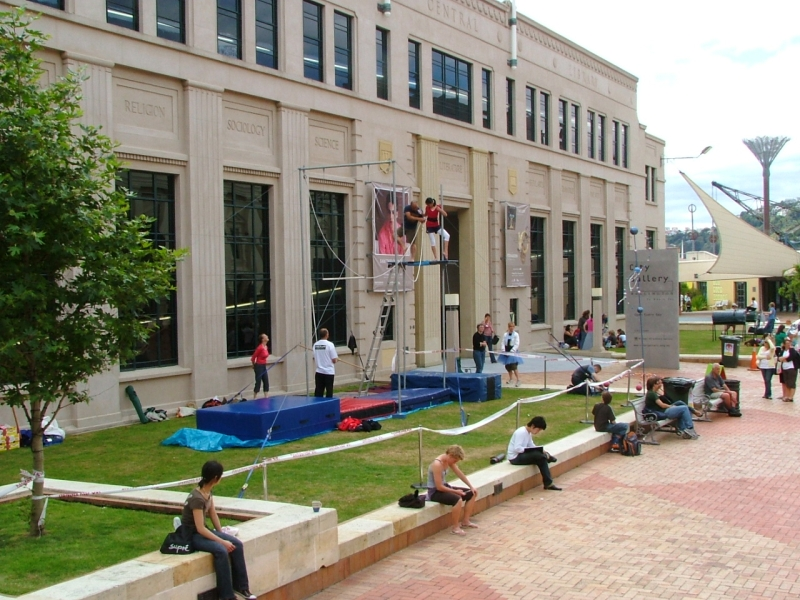
- A trapeze outside the City Gallery
- Interactive map of the Wellington Central Library (Former) Building area
- Former names: Wellington Public Library

General information
- Type: Art Gallery
- Architectural style: Art Deco
- Location: 8 Mercer Street, Wellington, New Zealand
- Coordinates: 41.288518°S 174.777270°E
- Current tenants: City Gallery
- Construction started: 1935
- Completed: 1940

Technical details
- Structural system: reinforced concrete frame
- Floor count: 2
- Floor area: 3,900 square metres

Design and construction
- Architect: Gummer and Ford
- Other designers: Stuart Gardyne (refurbishment architect)
- Awards: NZIA National Award 1994

City Gallery Wellington Te Whare Toi is a public art gallery in Wellington, New Zealand.

== History ==
City Gallery Wellington Te Whare Toi began its life as the Wellington City Art Gallery on 23 September 1980 in a former office block located at 65 Victoria Street, now the site of Wellington Central Library. The first exhibition was a group show of Wellington artists. In 1989, as work began on the new Wellington Library and Civic Centre, the gallery relocated to the other side of Victoria Street to occupy the old Chews Lane Post Office for four years until 1993 when it was rebranded as City Gallery Wellington and moved to its present location on the north-eastern side of Civic Square. Since 1995, City Gallery Wellington has been managed on behalf of the Wellington City Council by the Wellington Museums Trust which now trades as Experience Wellington.

Towards the end of 2023, around three years after initiating the restructuring of the City Gallery Wellington, Sarah Rusholme resigned as Chief Executive of Experience Wellington and was replaced by Diana Marsh. Other senior members of the Experience Wellington leadership team left at the same time as Rusholme, including Elizabeth Caldwell, Director Art & Heritage. In 2024 after months of significantly reduced hours to accommodate construction work on Wellington’s Central Library, Marsh announced the closure of the City Gallery Wellington to at least mid-2026 because of closure of the main accessway to Te Ngākau Civic Square due to demolition work on a former civic administration building and overdue maintenance and alterations to the Gallery building, which are being carried out in 2025. Two upcoming City Gallery Wellington exhibitions were scheduled to be exhibited at other venues: Generation X: 50 Artworks from the Chartwell Collection would be hosted by Te Papa from 27 July to 20 October 2024. Derek Jarman: Delphinium Days, by United Kingdom artist and gay rights activist Derek Jarman, would be held at The Dowse from 28 September to 26 January 2025.

City Gallery Wellington also announced a partnership with National Library Te Puna Mātauranga o Aotearoa who would provide gallery space to continue to bring exhibitions to Wellington while the City Gallery Wellington is temporarily away from home.

== The current building ==
City Gallery Wellington currently occupies the former Wellington Central Library building. Built in 1940 in an Art Deco style, this building replaced the original red brick City Library of 1893. The building was registered in 1981 by Heritage New Zealand as a Category 2 Historic Place.

When the Wellington Central Library relocated to its new Ian Athfield-designed building in 1991, the building underwent a major refurbishment so it could meet the needs of a contemporary art gallery. The Gallery's window installation was installed in 1994. Fault is by Bill Culbert and Ralph Hotere and consists of two strips of neon light cutting diagonally across the building. A significant addition built in 2008-2009 added two new galleries for emerging Wellington, Maori and Pacific art along with a 135-seat auditorium.

Since 2019, the roof of the gallery has hosted a 16 ft (5 m) sculpture of a hand with a face called Quasi that was created by Ronnie van Hout. In October 2024, officials announced that Quasi was to be removed and transferred to Australia.

== Directors ==
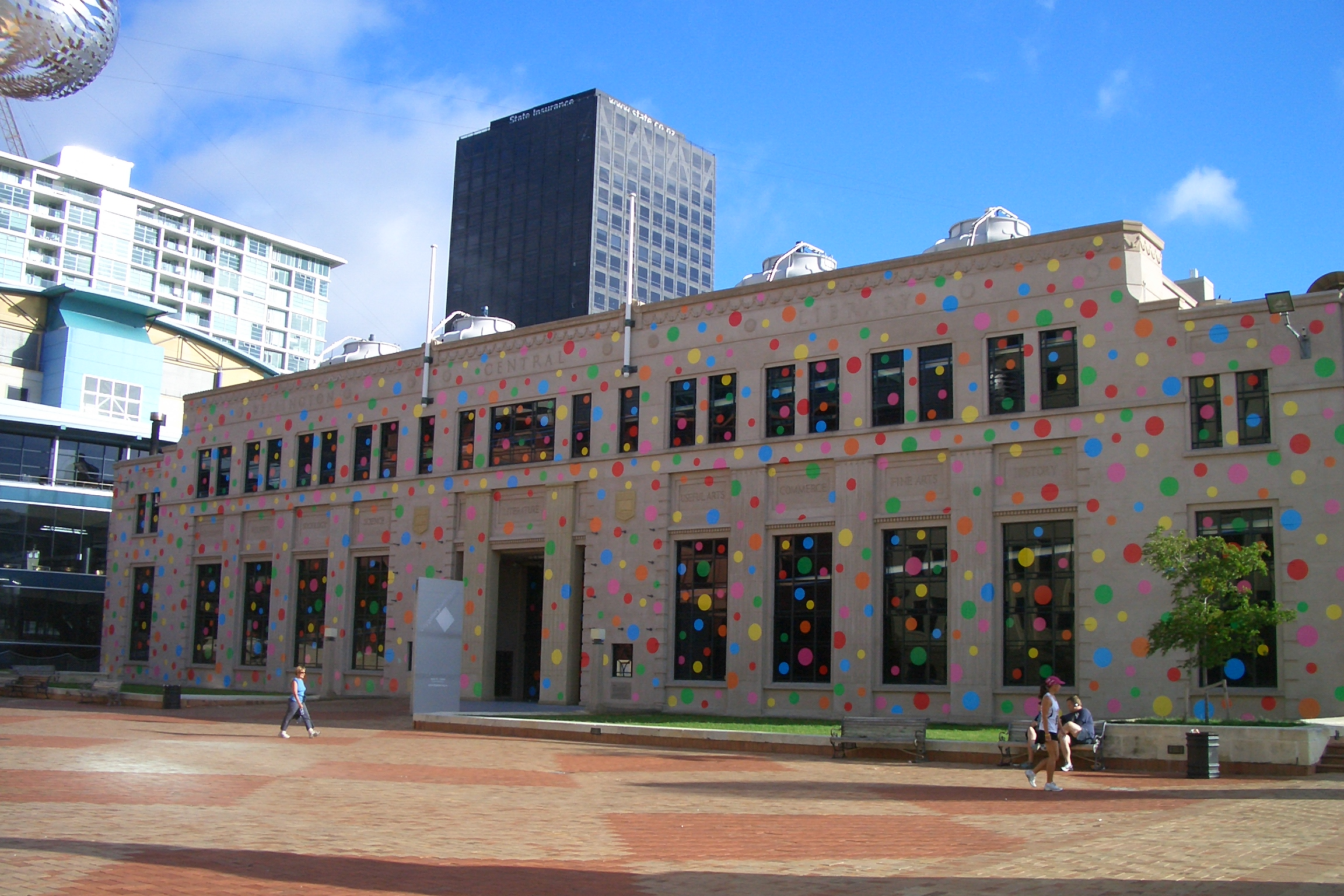
City Gallery covered in polka dots during the Yayoi Kusama exhibition

The first Director was Seddon Bennington, who went on to be the second Chief Executive of Te Papa. He was followed in 1982 by Ann Philbin who described the challenge of the Gallery's cramped quarters on Victoria Street, "When you work from a gallery that is not beautiful or grand—that does not even have a fridge or public toilets for functions—you have to sell your ideas." Philbin was followed by John Leuthart in1985 who appointed the Gallery's first curator Gregory Burke two years later. Paula Savage became Director in 1990 and oversaw the Gallery's move to the current location and its rebranding as City Gallery. The rebranding cemented a long-term relationship with the advertising agency Saatchi & Saatchi resulting in a number of award-winning ads. In 2009 Savage was responsible for one of the Gallery's most popular exhibitions: Yayoi Kusama: Mirrored Years with an attendance of 88,155. The same year she appointed City Gallery Wellington's first Curator of Māori and Pacific Art Reuben Friend. Elizabeth Caldwell followed Savage who left the Gallery in 2011 after twenty-two years as its director.

== Exhibitions ==
1982 Greer Twiss: a Survey 1959 – 1981 curated by the Director Seddon Bennington was the first major touring exhibition instituted by the Gallery.

1986 David Hockney: Hockney's Photographs was the first of many popular international exhibitions and City Gallery's first fee-paying show. To accommodate it, the Gallery was required to install air conditioning to meet international conservation standards.

1986 Karanga Karanga was the first public art museum exhibition in New Zealand of collaborative works by wāhine artists. Listener reviewer Georgina Kamiria Kirby described it as, "An exhibition done by Māori women, about Māori women, for Māori women"

1990 Now See Hear! Art, Language and Translation was the most ambitious exhibition attempted by City Gallery up to that time. Curated by Gregory Burke and Ian Wedde to mark 150 years since the signing of the Treaty of Waitangi, it featured 236 New Zealand and international artists.

1993 Rosemarie Trockel was the first exhibition City Gallery toured outside New Zealand when it travelled to the MCA in Sydney. It was curated by Gregory Burke and opened City Gallery's new building in Civic Square. Alongside the Rosemarie Trockel exhibition were four shows of women artists: Alter/Image, Te Whare Puanga, and Jacqueline Fraser's project He Tohu: The New Zealand Room. Alter/Image surveyed twenty years of work by New Zealand women artists.

In 1998 City Gallery worked with the acclaimed Dutch curator Rudi Fuchs to present The Exhibition of the Century: Modern Masters from the Stedelijk Museum, Amsterdam which included artists ranging from Vincent van Gogh to Jeff Koons. In 2006 a major exhibition by Australian artist Patricia Piccinini attracted a record audience for the time of 120,000.

Since opening at its current location in 1993, City Gallery has also hosted monographic exhibitions of many other major international artists including Tracey Emin, Keith Haring, Rosalie Gascoigne, Frida Kahlo and Diego Rivera, Tracey Moffatt, Sidney Nolan, Bridget Riley, Sam Taylor Wood, Salla Tykkä, Hilma af Klint, Stanley Spencer, Wim Wenders as well as New Zealand's own Laurence Aberhart, Rita Angus, Shane Cotton, Tony Fomison, Bill Hammond, Ralph Hotere, Ronnie van Hout, Melvin Day, Martin Thompson, and Boyd Webb.

A full list of exhibitions, catalogues and relevant commentary is hosted on City Gallery's Past Exhibitions page.

== Controversies ==
In 1995 a petition by the Christian Heritage Party collected 2829 signatures and an advertisement was placed in an unsuccessful but controversial attempt to close the Robert Mapplethorpe Retrospective exhibition at City Gallery Wellington. In March 1999, the same group tried to have the Keith Haring exhibition closed. They suggested that the police should photograph everybody visiting the exhibition, and complained that although the catalogue accompanying the exhibition was classed as unrestricted by the Office of Film and Literature Classification, the exhibition itself featured works of sodomy and bestiality that were not suitable for families. The party then submitted 18 works to the Office of Film and Literature Classification, but the case was not heard until after the exhibition closed. The censor classified five of the submitted works from the exhibition as "objectionable unless restricted to people over 13 or children accompanied by a parent or guardian".

Early in 2021, Experience Wellington announced a restructuring process which included changes to the staffing of City Gallery Wellington, the disestablishment of the role of a dedicated director, the removal of the senior curator Robert Leonard and the appointment of a curator Toi Māori. The restructure proved controversial, and although questioned by the Mayor and opposed by senior members of the wider arts community, it was fully implemented and the role of Director, held by Elizabeth Caldwell, was disestablished. A new role of Director Art & Heritage was established and Elizabeth Caldwell was appointed to this position.

In 2024 Diana Marsh undertook a realignment and the role of Director Art and Heritage was split into two positions – Director Art and City Gallery and Director History and Science. Charlotte Davy was appointed as Director Art and City Gallery.
