= Mountain Fountain =

Public sculpture in New Zealand

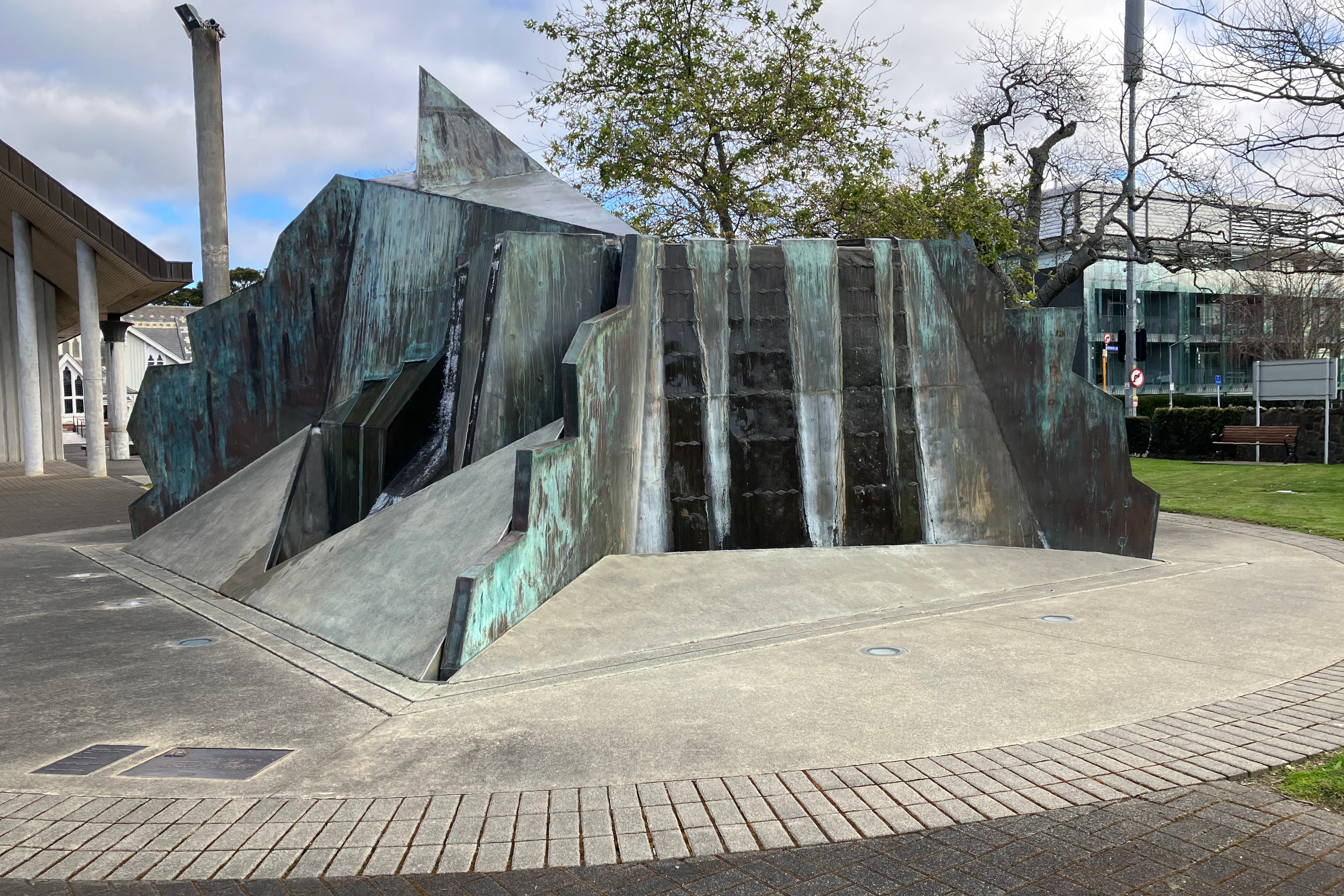
- Mountain Fountain in the Holy Trinity Cathedral's forecourt
- Artist: Terry Stringer
- Completion date: April 1981, re-sited 12 September 2010
- Medium: Bronze, plywood, steel, concrete
- Dimensions: 5 m × 6.3 m × 7.7 m (16 ft × 21 ft × 25 ft)
- Location: Auckland, New Zealand
- 36°51′32.8″S 174°47′00″E
- Owner: Auckland Council Art Collection
- Website: Auckland Public Art page

Mountain Fountain is a public sculpture located in the Parnell suburb of Auckland, New Zealand. It was designed by Terry Stringer and depicts a bronze Cubist volcano thrusting up from a concrete base, with streams of water falling from three of the sculpture's four faces. It was erected in its original location in Aotea Square in 1981. In 2008, it was decommissioned and placed in storage during redevelopment of the square. It was relocated to its current site in the forecourt of Holy Trinity Cathedral in 2010.

== Commission ==
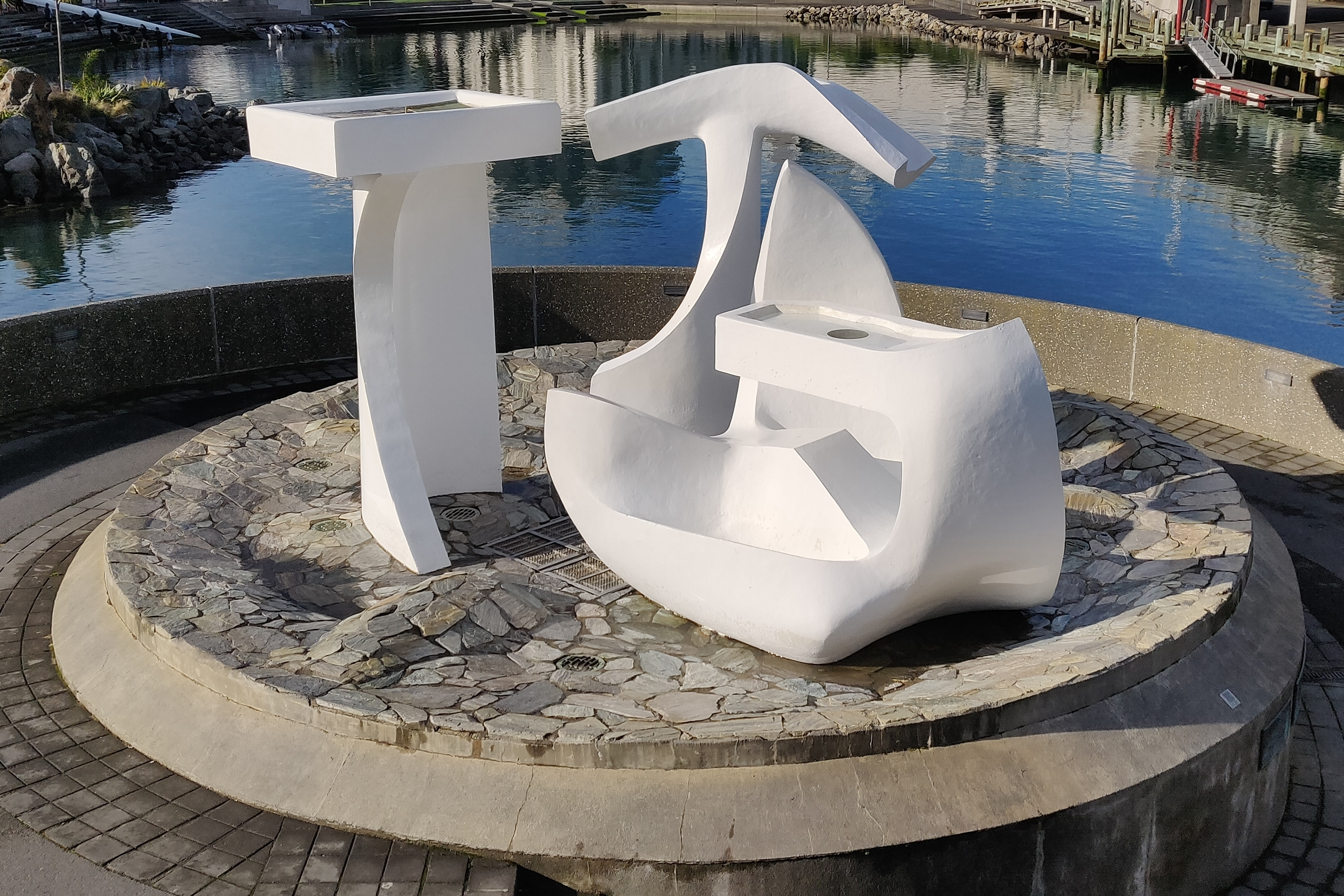
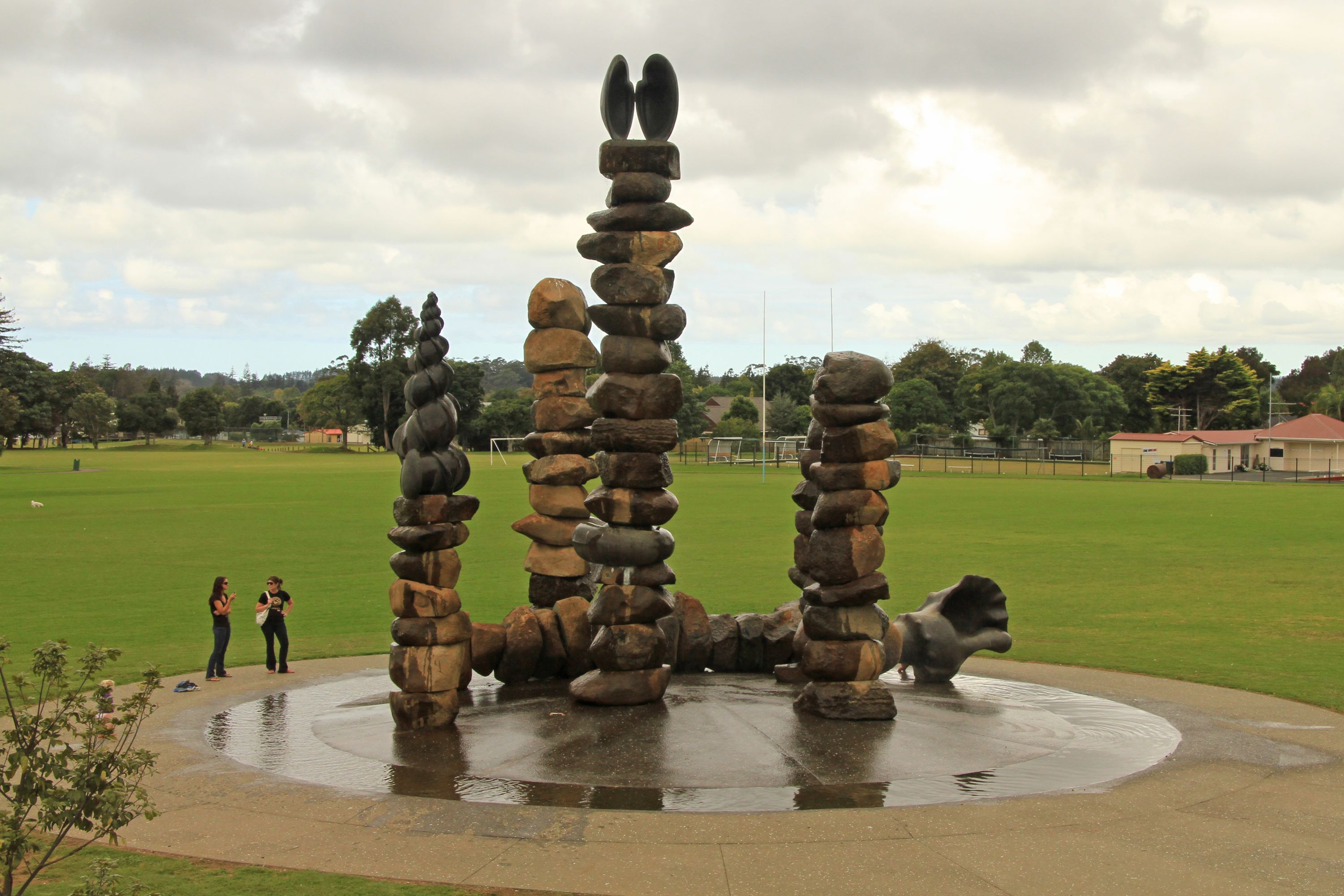
Two other finalists from the Aotea Square Water Sculpture competition were subsequently constructed: Tanya Ashken's Albatross (top) and Chris Booth's Te Whiringa o Manoko (bottom).

In 1978, the Auckland Savings Bank donated $75,000 to sponsor the construction of a sculpture featuring moving water in Aotea Square. The Auckland City Council voted to hold the Aotea Square Water Sculpture competition to select a work for the site. In December 1979, a panel consisting of Sir Dove-Myer Robinson, Dame Catherine Tizard, Colin Brenton-Rule, Peter Bartlett and Greer Twiss selected Terry Stringer's design as the winner from 42 entries and a shortlist of six finalists. The jury praised Stringer's entry for dealing "potently with a recognizable element of New Zealand—the land's vigorous geological formation." Stringer, who was 34 years old and working as a lecturer at the Auckland Society of Arts and part-time office cleaner at the time, was awarded $6000 in prize money.

Two other finalists were subsequently made into public sculptures, Tanya Ashken's Albatross (1986) in Whairepo Lagoon, Wellington, and Chris Booth's Te Whiringa o Manoko (1978–2009) in Kerikeri.

== Design and construction ==
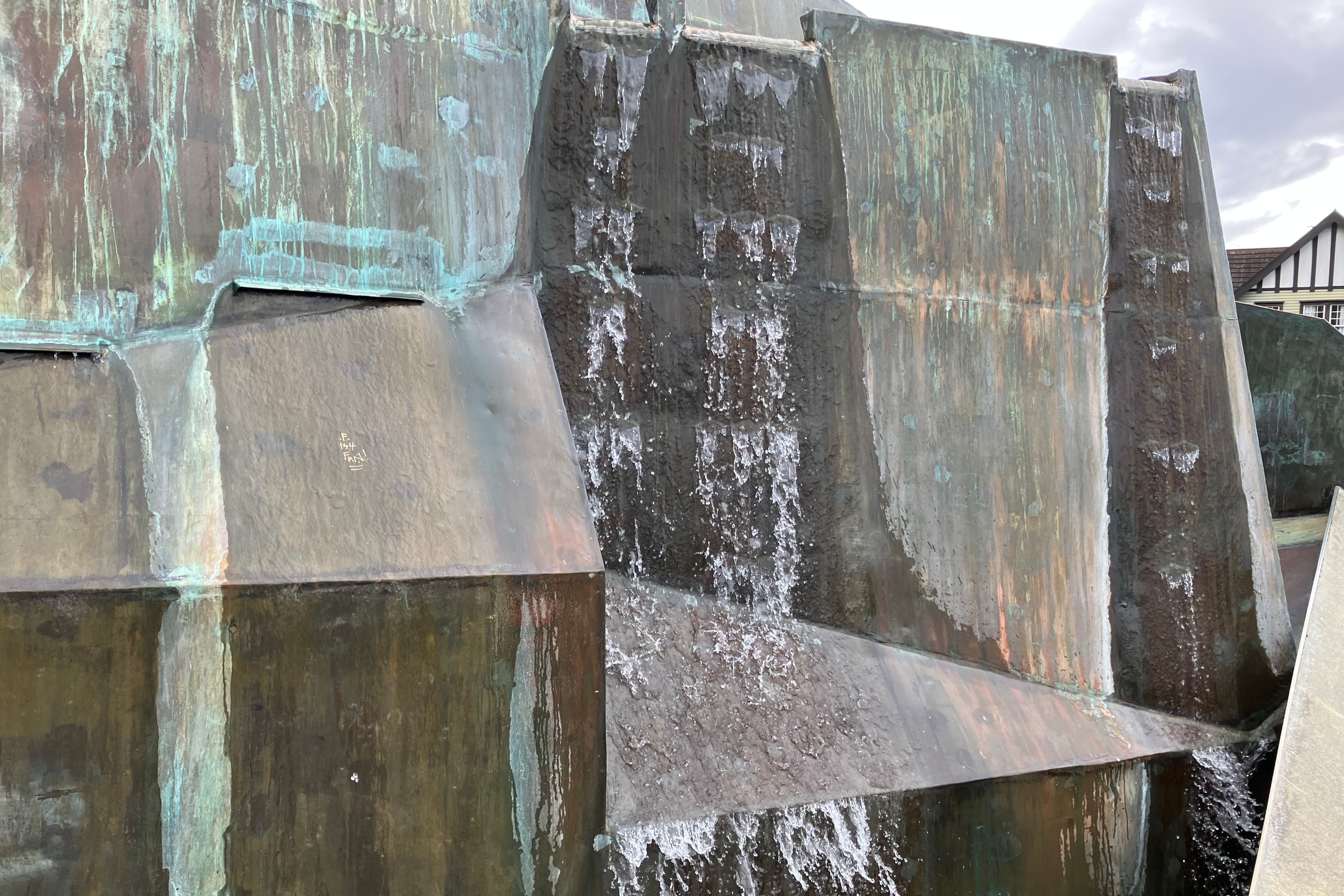
Surface detail of Mountain Fountain

Mountain Fountain took a year to build and was unveiled by Mayor Colin Kay in April 1981 with the title The Aotea Square Water Feature. Stringer called the work "Mountain Fountain" and by the time of its re-siting in 2010 this had become its official name. The sculpture is a Cubist landscape made of 1.5 tonnes of bronze sheets fastened to a concrete and plywood framework. It measures 5 metres (16 ft) tall, 7.7 metres (25 ft) long and 6.3 metres (21 ft) wide. It depicts a volcano erupting through the earth, alluding to the volcanic field upon which Auckland is built. Stringer envisioned the sculpture as bringing a piece of the wild nature of New Zealand's landscape into the city. Streams of water added to the sense of movement.

Stringer wanted the sculpture to suggest "another of Auckland's volcanoes pushing up through Aotea Square" to offer "all the delights of hills and mountains" including "waterfalls, pools and streams and the pleasant sound of falling water". The triangular geometric rockiness of the sculpture's shape was intended to relate to the "canyon of buildings" encircling the square, in the tradition of the Trevi Fountain growing out of its building backdrop, while also differentiating it from Auckland's existing sculptural fountains. Stringer's original design included a bronze figure of a girl in modern clothes lying in a pool, representing "the spectator falling into a river and the spirit of falling water itself." The feature was removed because it was deemed too frivolous and Stringer realised after the sculpture was set out on the square that there was insufficient space to accommodate it.

== Reception ==
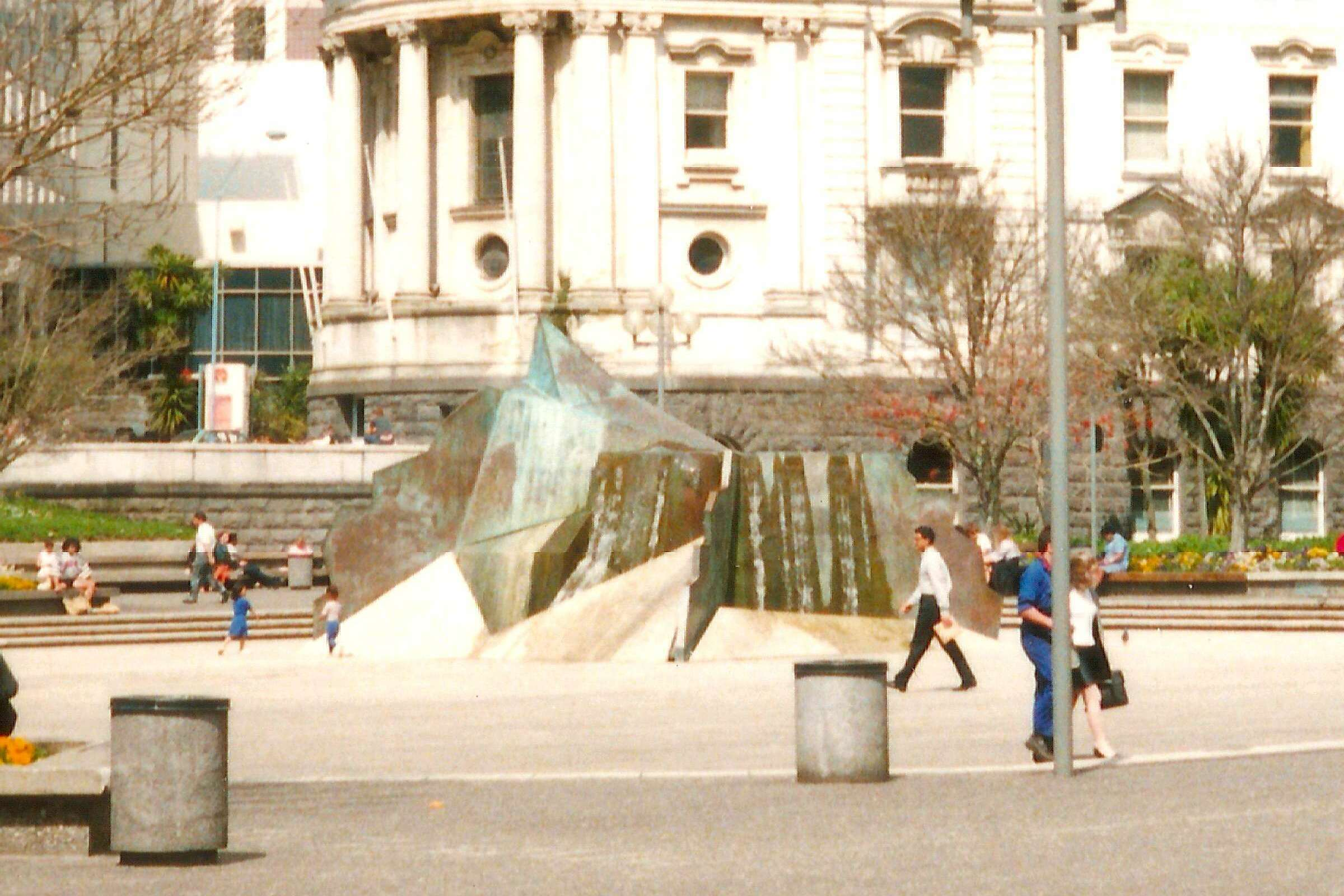
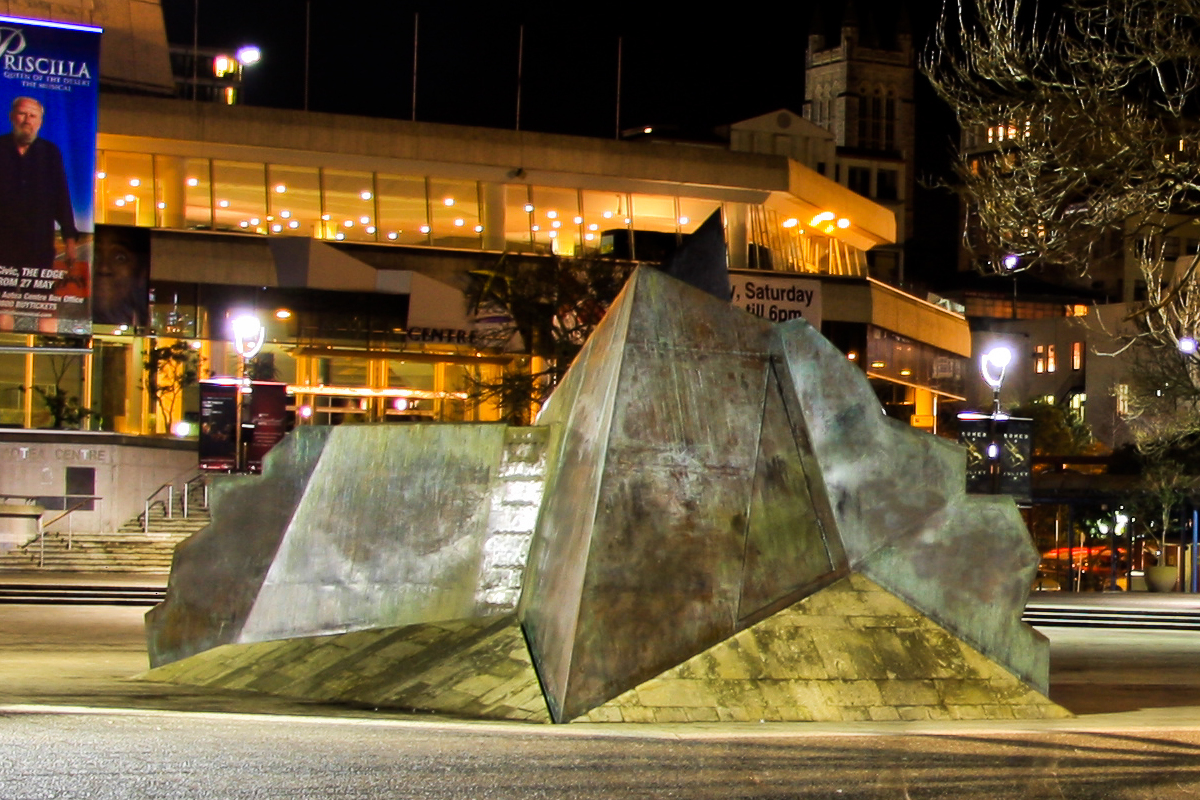
Two views of Mountain Fountain in Aotea Square: 1990 (top) and 2008 (bottom).

The Auckland Star called Mountain Fountain a "diverting, and different ... craggy contribution." Tizard said the rock bursting up through the square and creating a water source "renders a deeply meaningful idea with great power." Allen Curnow expressed optimism about the proposed design, hoping that the city might see "a sculpture which truly reflects the public taste." The New Zealand Herald art critic T.J. McNamara praised it as "a grand piece of sculpture", calling it "an addition to the splendid hills of Auckland" and likening the sculpture's large forms to "big lava flows". Art historian Robin Woodward identified Mountain Fountain as what he saw as one of the top sculptures that "[integrated] the urban and the sculptural" in New Zealand, alongside Paratene Matchitt's City to Sea Bridge (1993) and Greer Twiss' Karangahape Rocks (1969).

Art historian Michael Dunn felt that the piece was uncharacteristic of Stringer, notably the "plain, bland surface" of the piece, and how Stringer typically focused on creating artworks for domestic settings, instead of public. Dunn felt that the surfaces of Mountain Fountain have a "robust quality that is necessary in a public situation".

=== Skateboarding culture ===
Mountain Fountain was designed to accommodate the possibility that people might climb on it. Over time, its angled planes and banks made it a favourite location for skateboarders, and by the late 1980s Aotea Square had become a central hub for skateboarding culture in Auckland. With the decline in popularity of skateboarding after the 1970s, most of Auckland's best skateboard bowls disappeared, making Aotea Square a popular destination for skateboarders. New Zealand skateboarders Levi Hawken and Chey Ataria have commented on the sculpture's iconic status and formative influence within Auckland's skateboarding community. Alex Dyer in New Zealand Skateboarder Annual called Aotea Square "the most iconic New Zealand skate spot."

Stringer did not envision this role for the sculpture but later expressed happiness at the development, saying, "I'm very happy they have adapted it to their own use, that it's found that sense of life." In 1988, the sculpture had to be reinforced with steel due to the unforeseen wear and tear from skateboarders; stress from skateboarding had broken off chunks of stone from the sculpture. Stringer opposed alternate solutions proposed at the time to install a bar or move the sculpture to prevent skateboarding, favoring reinforcement because he was happy to see his sculpture used as a skateboarding ramp.

== Decommission and relocation ==
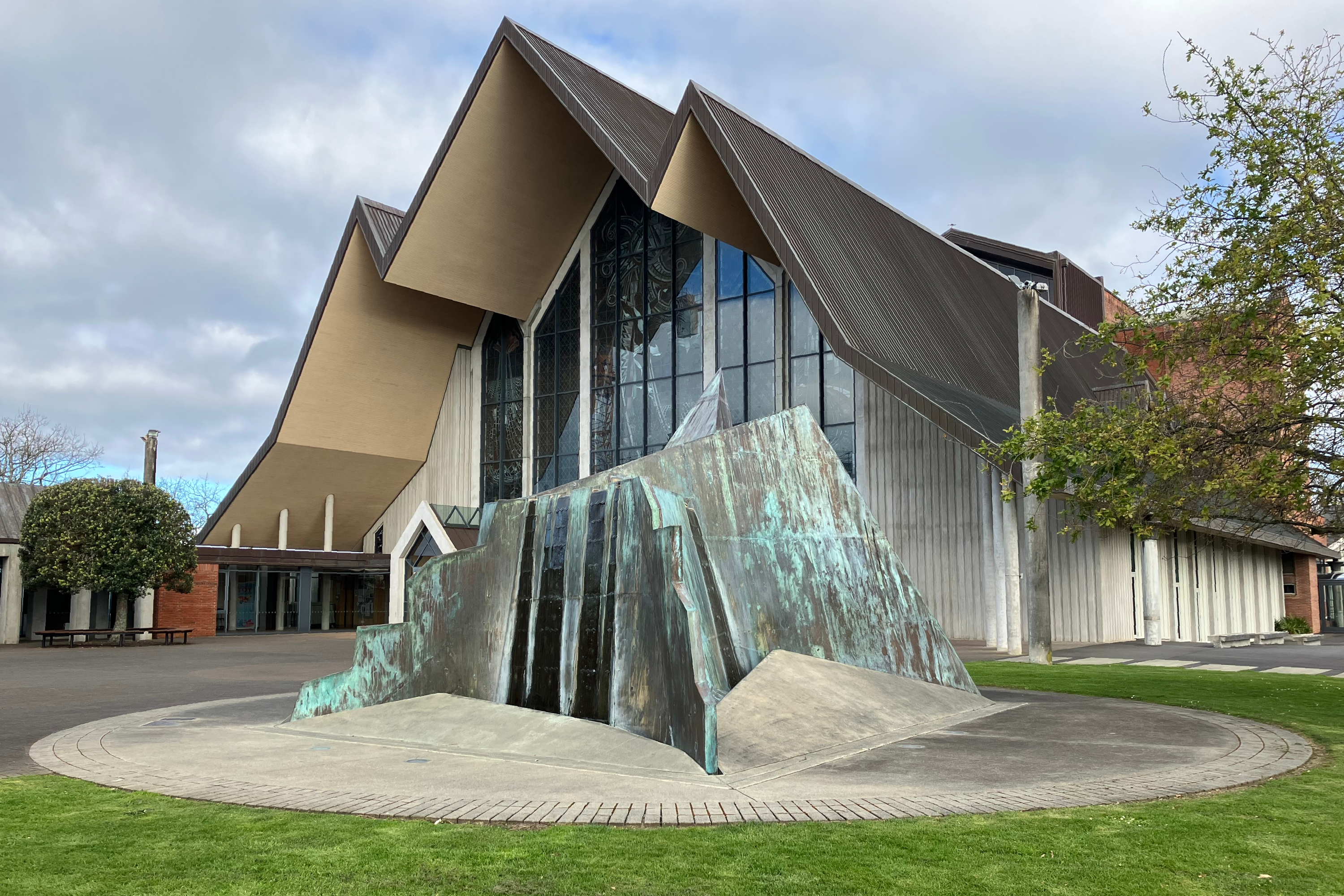
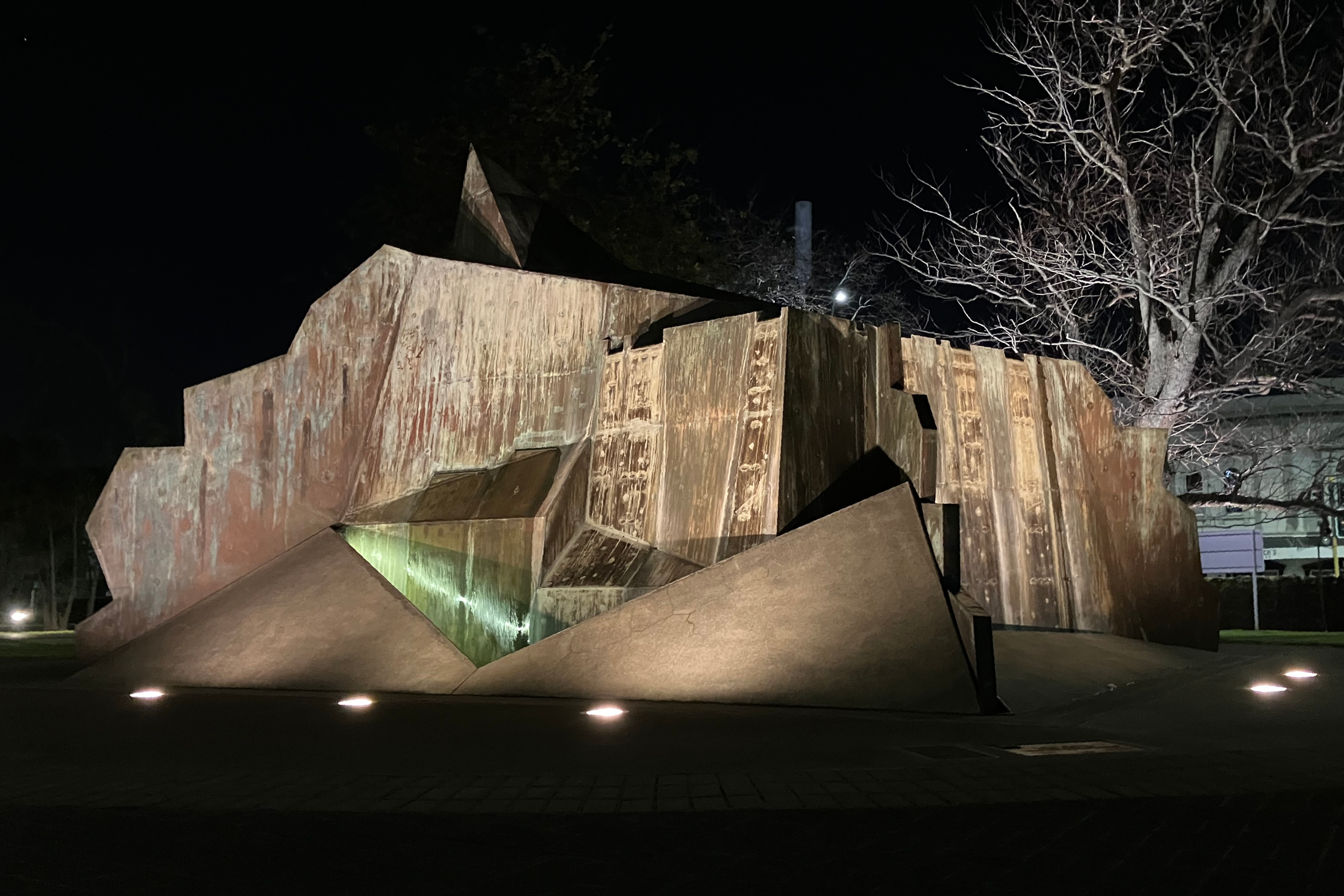
Mountain Fountain in its current location in the forecourt of Holy Trinity Cathedral

In 2005, the Auckland City Council planned to tear down the Mountain Fountain sculpture as part of a redesign of Aotea Square, but backed down after outcry from the public and members of New Zealand's arts community. The sculpture was causing structural problems to the roof of the Civic Theatre underground car park located beneath the square, and did not fit with the square's planned upgrade and renovation as a wide open space for performances, concerts, and public meetings. The Auckland City Council removed the sculpture and placed it in storage in 2008 after assessing structural issues and public space considerations as part of an $80 million restoration project to Aotea Square and the underground car park.

In June 2009, an Auckland City Council advisory panel for public art voted unanimously to move Mountain Fountain to a new location, citing "the impact of the structure on the event space" and the need to ensure the car park roof's waterproofing. From an art perspective, the panel felt Mountain Fountain was out of scale and dwarfed by the large, open square, and "would do more work in a smaller site." From an engineering perspective, the sculpture could not be returned to the square because its water system could not be embedded in the new car park roof. Stringer was open to the move but objected to the council's process, calling their reasons "spurious" and noting that they had not discussed their issues with his engineer.

The advisory panel suggested three new locations for Mountain Fountain, at Parliament Reserve, Victoria Park, and Mission Bay's Selwyn Reserve, and recommended public consultation to decide the new location. When Holy Trinity Cathedral council member John Wilson discovered the sculpture was being relocated he approached Stringer, who then approached the Auckland City Council. After consultation with Stringer, the public, and council art advisors, Mountain Fountain was relocated to the forecourt of Holy Trinity Cathedral. It was dedicated in its new location on 12 September 2010.

Stringer and Wilson noted the complementary synergy between the sculpture's zigzag shapes and the three peaks of the cathedral's roofline. The cathedral's architect Richard Toy intended to have an artwork situated next to the cathedral and the fountain's relocation fulfilled his original vision. The New Zealand Herald arts writer Janet McAllister thought the sculpture looked good at its new site, but had misgivings that some non-Christian ratepayers might "feel uncomfortable visiting it on diocese land." Stringer commented on the appropriateness of the sculpture's "resurrection" at the cathedral, and related it to a personal resurrection; while building the sculpture in 1980 he would visit his terminally ill father at Auckland City Hospital, and seeing Mountain Fountain rebuilt renewed his memories of his father.

== Gallery ==
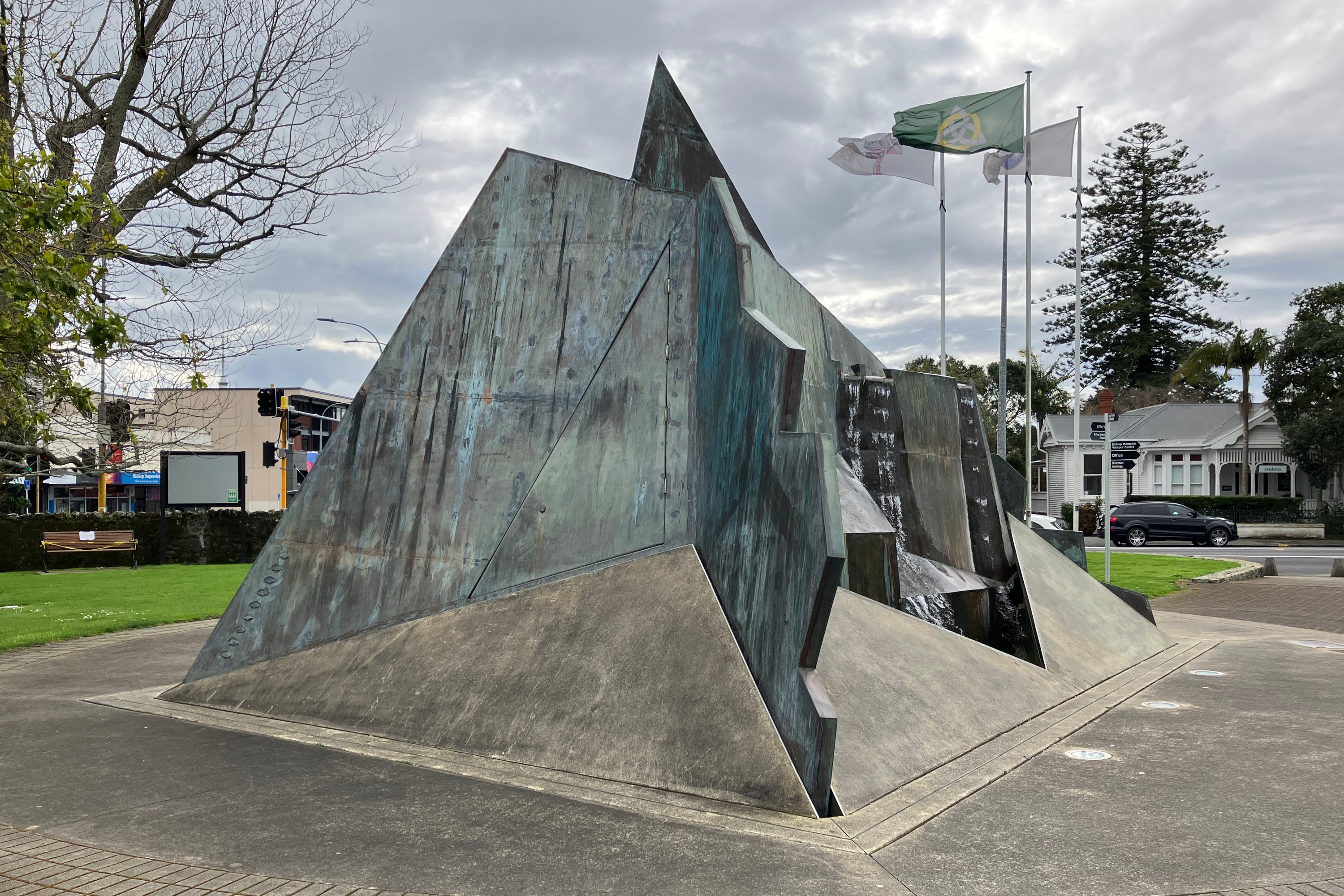
Southeast corner of Mountain Fountain

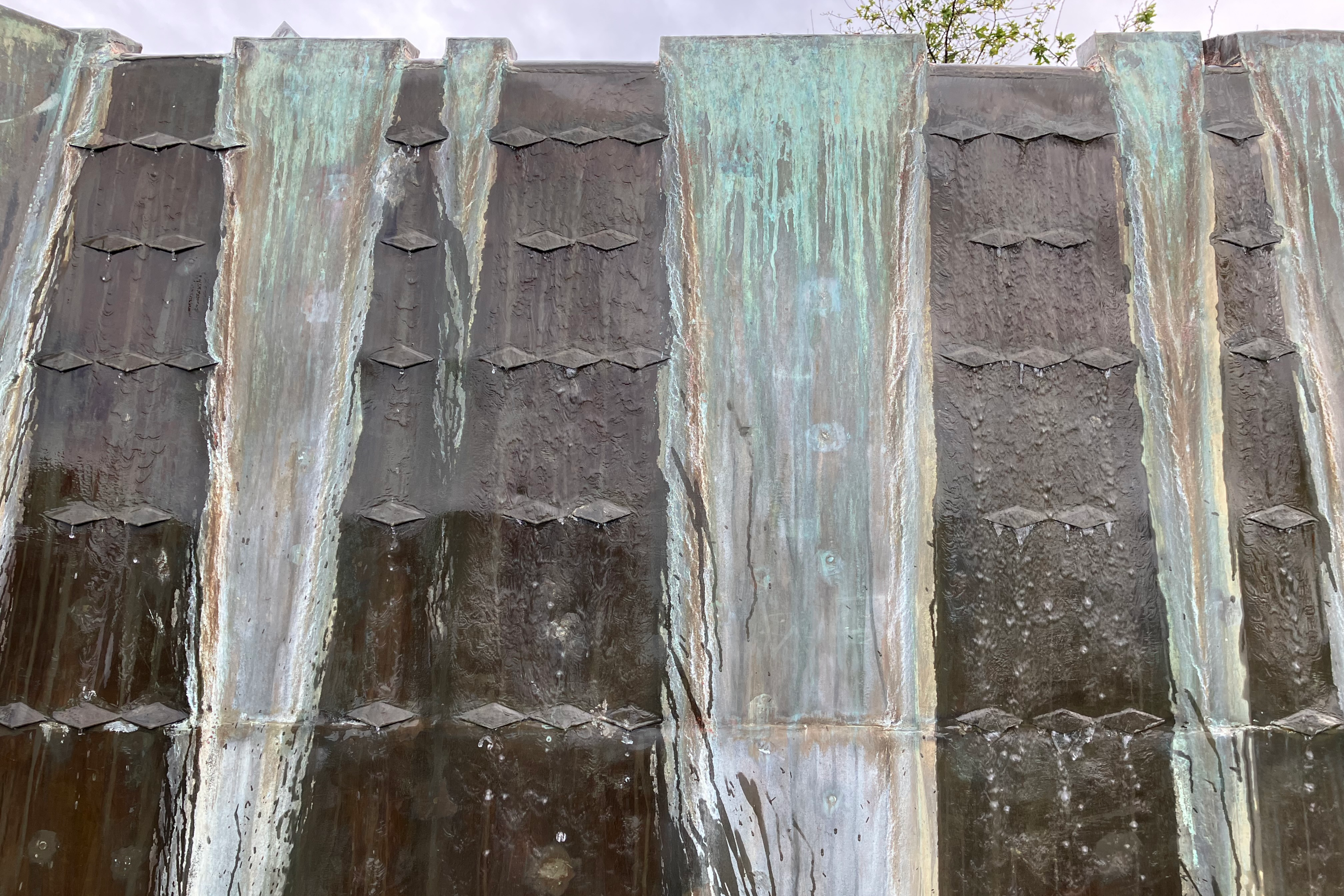
Close-by detail of Mountain Fountain's north face

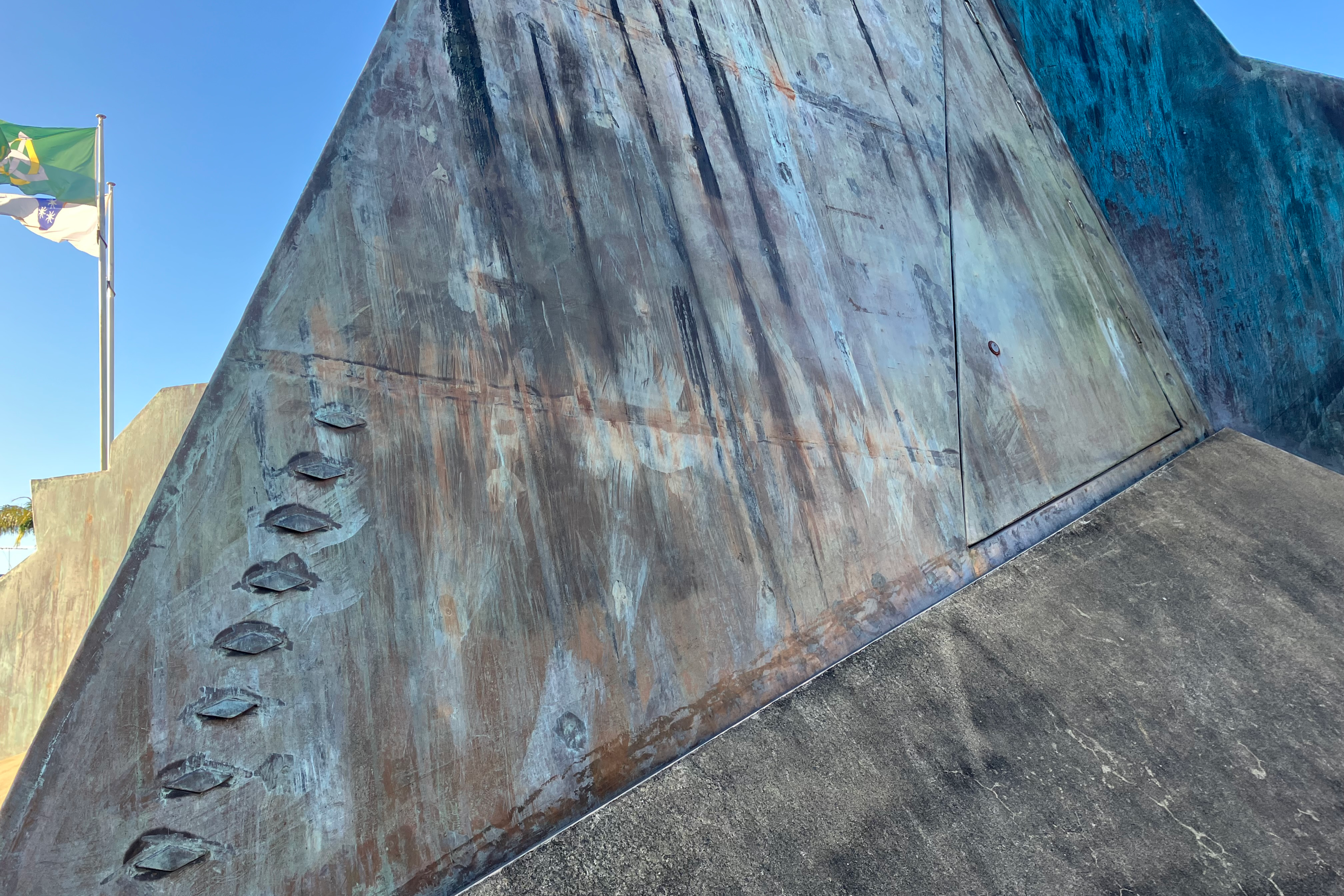
Surface detail of south face

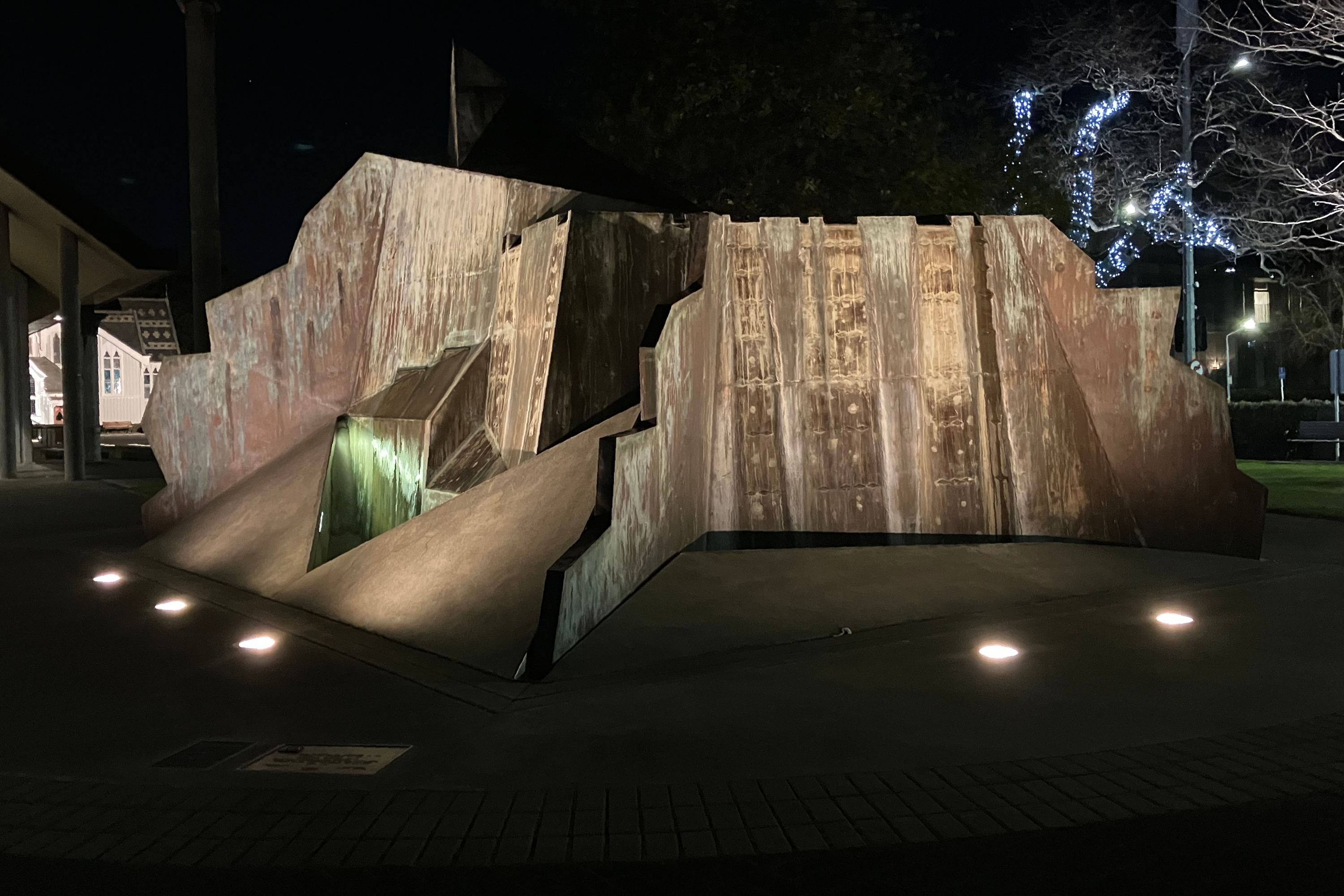
Northeast corner at night

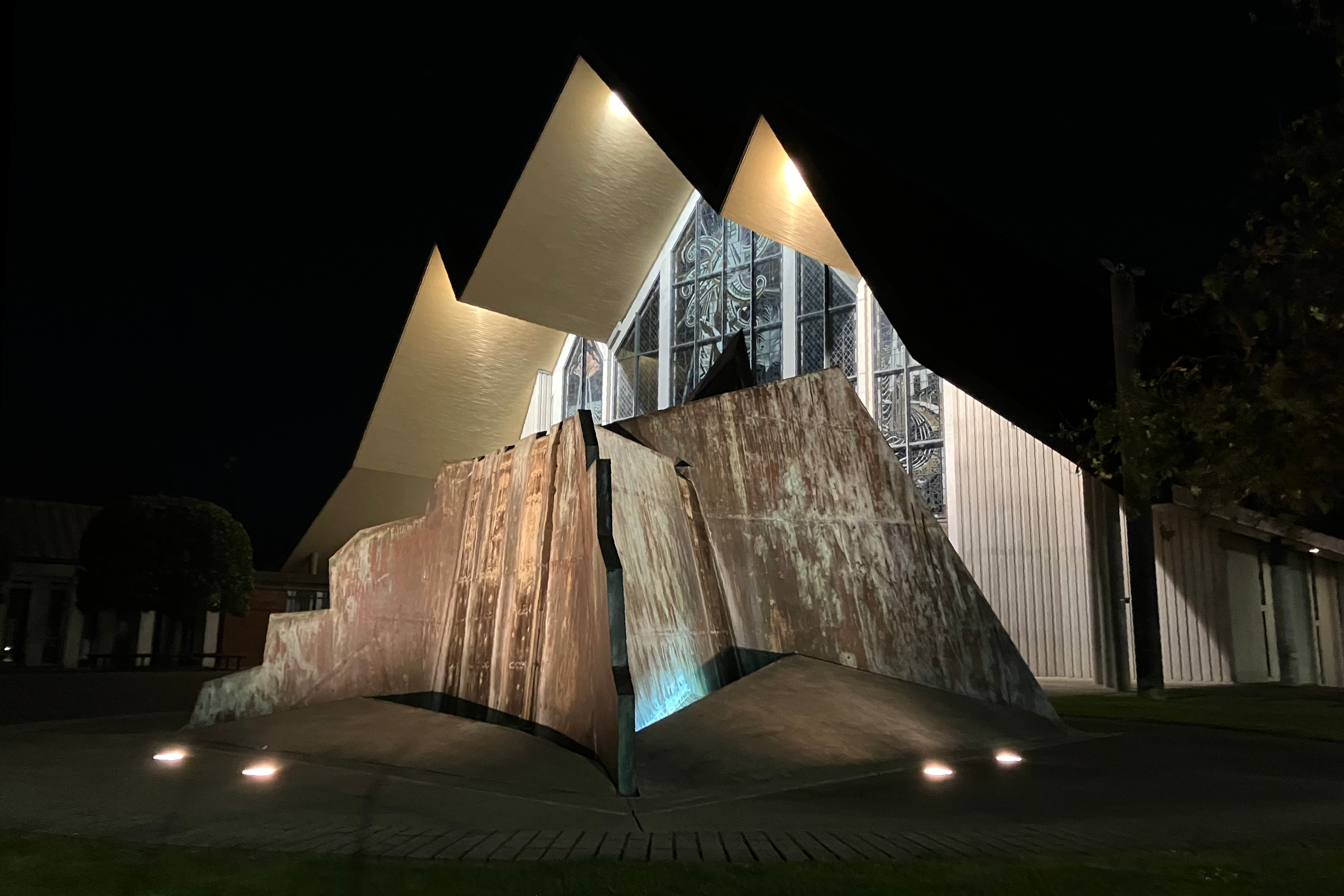
Northwest corner at night
