= Terry Stringer =

New Zealand sculptor

Terry Stringer ONZM
- Born: 3 September 1946 (age 80); Redruth, Cornwall, England
- Education: Elam School of Fine Arts
- Known for: Sculpture
- Notable work: The Risen Christ; Mountain Fountain

Terry Robin George Stringer ONZM (born 3 September 1946) is a sculptor from New Zealand.

== Early life and education ==
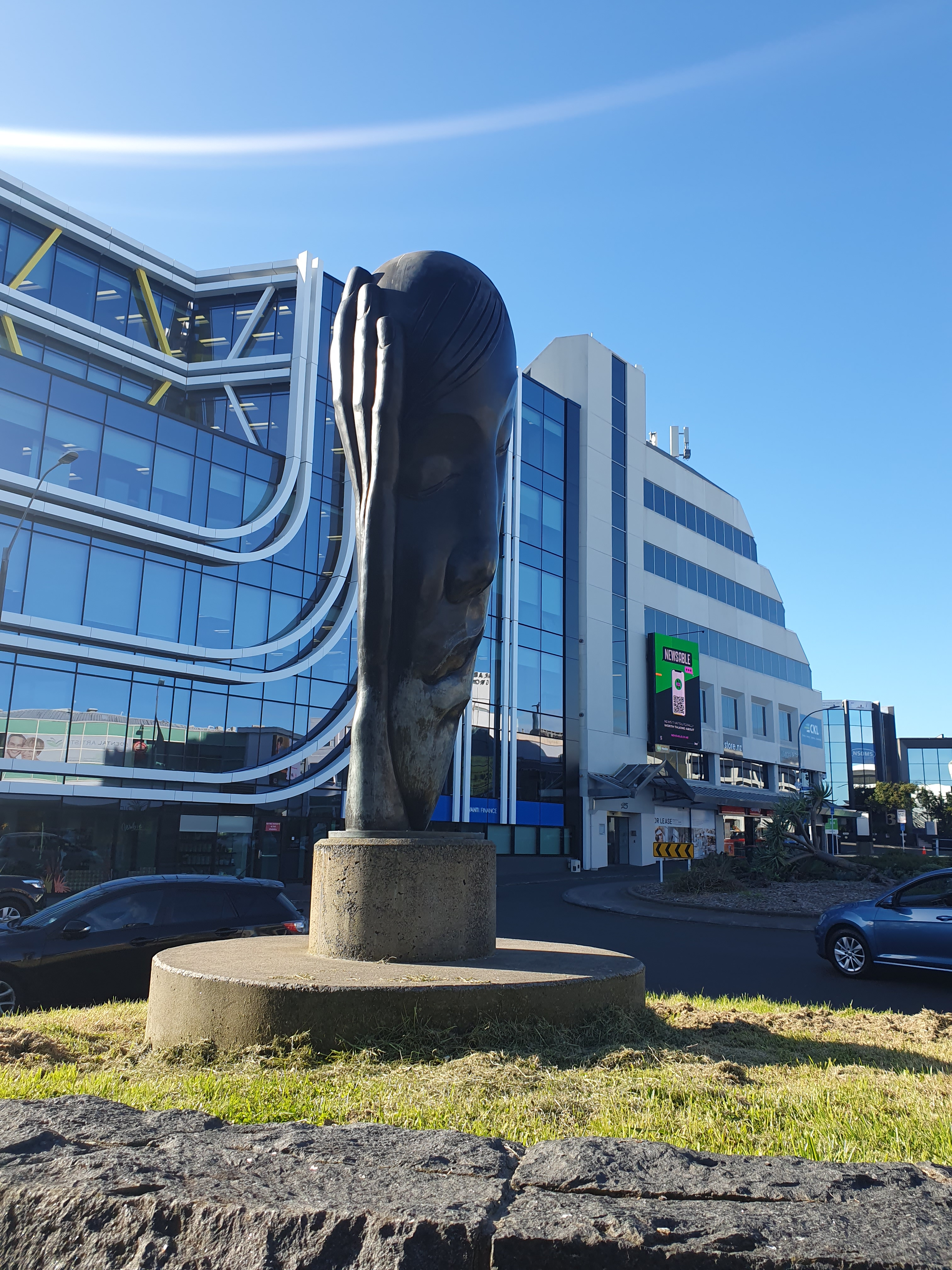
The World Grasped in Newmarket

Terry Stringer was born in Redruth, Cornwall, England in 1946. His family moved to New Zealand in 1951 and Stringer became a naturalised New Zealander in 1979. He attended Auckland Grammar School and received a Diploma of Fine Arts from the Elam School of Fine Arts in 1967. During his time at Elam he formed a friendship with the artist Lois White. He created sculptures of White, Katherine Mansfield and Rita Angus. On leaving art school Stringer then worked as a postie for seven years as he developed his art practice. He had his first dealer exhibition at the Barry Lett Galleries in 1974. Two years later he shared the first prize in the 1976 Hansell’s Sculpture Awards with Warren Viscoe having entered five times previously. Making a living off his art proved difficult and he took on a number of part-time jobs that included teaching adult classes at the Auckland and Pakuranga art societies. By 1982 he was finally able to work as a full-time sculptor. Stringer is in a long-term relationship with organist Tim McWhannell. In 2006, Stringer estimated that the couple had been together for around 30 years.

== Art career ==
Stringer’s early work was largely constructed from painted boards and timber. As art writer Stephen Ellis described it, ‘Stringer works in two dimensions: painting and arranging the elements of his sculptures into three - always conscious of the conflict (or the conversation) between the two vocabularies. From the beginning Stringer’s work was affected by a visual anomaly that tends to flatten his visual field making it difficult to judge depth. As Stringer has noted it has required him to, ‘deduce depth from visual clues.’

One consistent subject of his work of the late 1970s was the table. An early version is Torso/Flowers on the Table which was exhibited in the 1978 Mildura Sculpture Triennial in Australia. Initially these optically confusing painted tables acted as plinths for other sculpture as their titles such as Table Time (1982) and Cards on the Tabletop (1984) indicate. Art historian Laurence Simmons described a 1982 work Table with Fruit as ‘polychromed bronze’ but noted that ‘the objects displayed on the table surface [that] have been delicately coloured. The bowl of oranges, tilted at an unsettling angle, has been placed in one corner diametrically opposed by an orange peel and knife projecting out from the table edge at the other.’ Stringer once described the process as ‘applying a three dimensional visual concept onto an idea about two dimensional painting’. The result was the presentation of objects inhabiting a space between two and three dimensions that challenged the visual assumptions of viewers to decipher what they thought they saw against what was in fact present. By the late 1980s Stringer increasingly worked with bronze figurative sculptures ‘cropped or sliced’ to reveal unexpected features as viewers walked around them. Stringer’s subjects also began to reveal his deep response to religious stories and characters. In The Shoes of the Father feet bearing the stigmata of the crucified Christ merge with the shoes of the Father in a complex visual puzzle that also reveals the profile of a face emerging from one of the feet. As writer Robin Woodward noted, ‘In the Christian reading as well as in terms of expectations of gender and role modelling on the more earthly, human level, the task is not presented as easy-it is a tall order-it is a big shoe to fill.’ Along with figurative standalone sculptures Stringer has also made sets for theatre and dance performances and in 1994 collaborated with Witi Ihimaera on an artist's book titled Mask and Mirror. Stringer also has a history of medallion and trophy making including designs for New Zealand sports trophies.

== Zealandia Sculpture Garden ==
In 2001 Stringer established Zealandia Sculpture Garden at his home in Mahurangi. The garden was open to the public and displayed many sculptures by Stringer as well as works by fellow sculptors including Greer Twiss, Molly McAllister, Chris Booth, Richard McWhannell and Mary-Louise Brown. Stringer commented that he made the garden public because ‘As an artist I think if you store your works, you don't really progress, you just do the same thing. Having them on display pushes you more.’ Central to the garden was Stringer’s house designed with architect Pip Cheshire. The garden closed in 2021 when Stringer moved into Central Auckland.

== Selected public commissions ==
Stringer is probably best known for his public sculptures which are located throughout New Zealand.

Terry Stringer 'Grand Head' 1987

- 1981 With Mountain Fountain Stringer won the Auckland Savings Bank/Auckland City Council Aotea Square water sculpture competition. Initially Stringer had included a woman sitting by the pool but the idea was rejected by Council. In 2005 the Council decided to remove it but were forced to backtrack after a ‘public out-cry’. Three years later The Aotea Square Water Feature [I don’t get the title change – is this two works??] was removed from the square for renovation and eventually reinstalled outside the Holy Trinity Cathedral in Parnell.
- 1986 Grand Head Wellington was commissioned by Renouf Properties as part of the Wellington Arts Bonus Scheme that offered developers extra floor space in exchange for commissioning art works for the city.
- 1987 White Lightning was gifted to the people of Rotorua by the Rotorua Area Electricity Authority and is located in the Tutanekai Mall.
- 1988 Tree Set is located in the lobby of Auckland’s Mainzeal House.
- 1990 Dame Kiri was commissioned for the Aotea Centre, Auckland to celebrate the opera singer Dame Kiri Te Kanawa.
- 1991 The Blacksmith was commissioned in Havelock North and includes the original anvil used by one of the town’s early blacksmiths.
- 1999 The Risen Christ is located in Cathedral Square, Christchurch. It was undamaged by the 2010-11 earthquakes and is currently (2026) in storage awaiting decisions about the damaged Cathedral.
- 2002 Faith Hope & Love was commissioned for the school by St Cuthbert’s Old Girls Association in Auckland
- 2005 The World Grasped was first installed on Broadway, near the intersection with Remuera Road in Auckland. It was moved in 2010 close to the Broadway and Parnell Road roundabout. As you circle the sculpture it transforms from a boy leaning on his hand in thought to the same hand reaching for an apple which then becomes a globe of the world resting on the shoulders of Atlas.
- 2006 Queen Victoria Thinks of Te Kawau, Te Kawau Thinks of Queen Victoria, Selwyn College in Auckland.
- 2010 Body Language Spirit of Place is sited close to the Palmerston North City Council Administration Building.
- 2011 Dance to the Music of Time is inspired by a lightening bolt. It is situated near the corner of Queen Elizabeth II Drive and Trafalgar Street in Nelson.

== Exhibition history ==
Stringer has shown with a number of dealer galleries in New Zealand including Barry Lett Galleries, Denis Cohn Gallery, Brooke-Gifford Gallery, Milford Galleries, Janne Land Gallery and Artis Gallery. In Australia: Robin Gibson Gallery and Hogarth Galleries. In the United States: the Beppu Wiarda Gallery, Ankrum Galleries and Mark Woolley Gallery; In London: Simmons Gallery.

=== Selected solo exhibitions ===
- 1978 Bronzes & Painted Wood Sculpture Waikato Art Museum, Hamilton
- 1981 'Living Room' Manawatu Art Gallery, Palmerston North, Sarjeant Gallery, Wanganui, Dowse Art Gallery, Lower Hutt
- 1982 'Wrap Around Sculpture' National Art Gallery, Wellington
- 1998 Personal Museum Bishop Suter Gallery, Nelson; Hawke's Bay Exhibition Centre
- 2000 The Shrine Whangarei Art Museum
- 2000 MM: Millenium Medallions Auckland War Memorial Museum
- 2001 Living in My Head Te Tuhi, Auckland
- 2014 Landscape of the Head Tauranga Art Gallery

=== Selected group exhibitions ===
- 1971 New Zealand Young Contemporaries Auckland City Art Gallery
- 1973 Drawings Invitational Manawatu Art Gallery Palmerston North
- 1978 New Zealand Sculptors at Mildura Australia
- 1985 ANZART Artists' Book Show Auckland City Art Gallery
- 1986 Aspects of Recent NZ Art: Sculpture 1 Auckland City Art Gallery
- 1990 New Zealand Self Portraits CSA Gallery, Christchurch
- 1991 Home Made Home Wellington City Art Gallery
- 1999 Face to Face Auckland City Art Gallery.
- 2003 Image and Object: Still Life in New Zealand Pataka Art + Museum, Porirua
- 2005 A Comparison of Scale New Zealand Contemporary Medallion Group, Te Tuhi, Auckland
- 2005 The 237th Royal Academy of Arts Summer Exhibition Burlington House, London, United Kingdom

== Collections ==
You can find examples of Stringers work are in the following public collections:

Auckland Art Gallery

Chartwell Collection, Auckland

Christchurch Art Gallery

Dowse Art Museum Lower Hutt

Sarjeant Gallery, Whanganui

Te Papa Tongarewa, Wellington

== Honours and awards ==
- 1977 Awarded a Queen Elizabeth II Arts Council Travel Grant and in 1979, 1981, 1982 and 1986 Queen Elizabeth II Arts Council Scholarships and grants
- 1982 Awarded an ICI artist Bursary.
- 1986 TV1 Kaleidoscope documentary.
- 2003 New Year Honours. Appointed an Officer of the New Zealand Order of Merit, for services to sculpture.
- 2008 Member of the judging panel for the World of Wearable Art, Nelson
