= John Endean =

New Zealand hotelier (1844–1925)

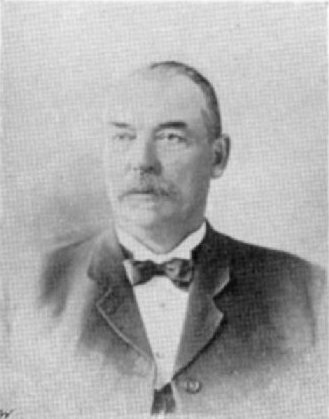
Portrait of John Endean published in The Cyclopedia of New Zealand

John Endean (1 December 1844 – 3 January 1925) made his money in gold mining in three countries. He settled in Auckland, New Zealand, where he was a hotel proprietor. The Endeans Building built for him on Auckland's Queen Street is a landmark that is registered with Heritage New Zealand; his private residence in Symonds Street is also a registered heritage building.

== Early life ==
Endean was born in Tywardreath, Cornwall, England in 1844. He went into mining in his home country, but emigrated to Australia in 1863, where he got into gold mining. The following year, he went to California and from there silver mining on Treasure Hill in Nevada. He left San Francisco in 1870 for the gold rush in Thames on Coromandel Peninsula, New Zealand.

In the following year, he married Ellen Phillips, the daughter of Harry Phillips, an early settler of Thames. He became a hotel proprietor in Grahamstown (Thames).

== Life in Auckland ==
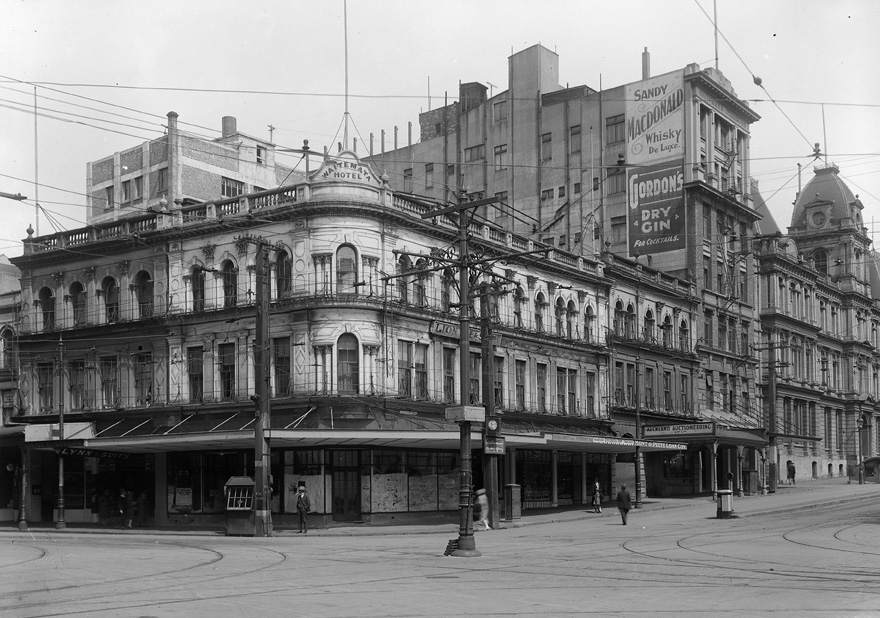
The Waitemata Hotel in 1927

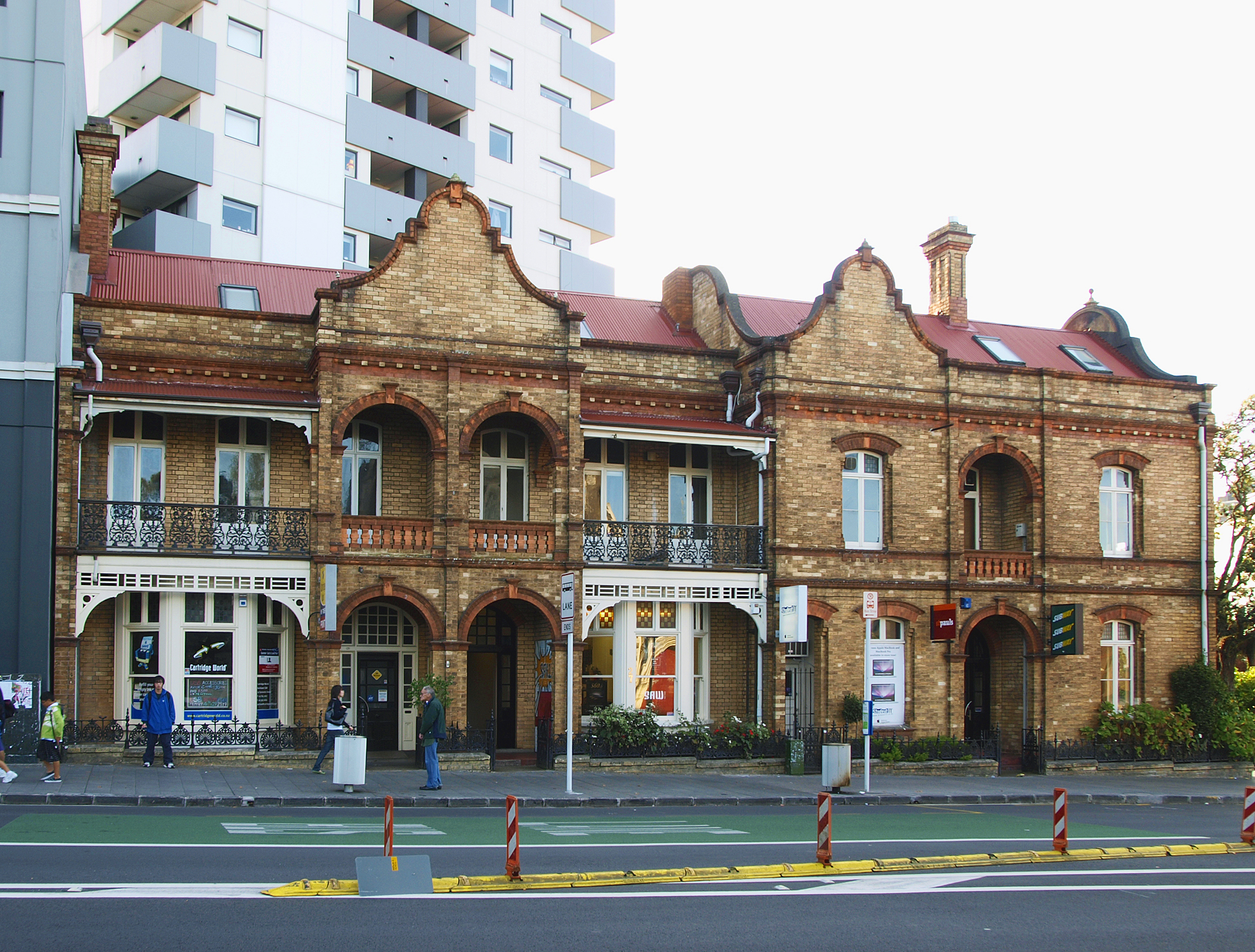
The private house of the Endean family in Symonds Street, Auckland, built in circa 1897

They moved to Auckland, where he continued as a hotel proprietor; first of the Railway Terminus Hotel from December 1877, and from February 1887 of the Waitemata Hotel. The Waitemata was located on the south-west corner of the intersection of Customs and Queen Street. One of his sons, John Albert "Jack" Endean (born 11 February 1874), took over the licence from him. Today, the site is occupied by the Tower Centre (45 Queen Street).

In 1894, his wife was one of two women who stood for election to Auckland City Council, only one year after women received the vote in New Zealand. The other woman was elected in the Parnell Ward, but Ellen Endean came fourth and last in the Grafton Ward.

Endean built the Endeans Building on the corner of Queen and Quay Streets in Auckland in 1905, which was replaced after a fire in 1914–15; it is listed as a Category II heritage building. The family lived in a large house in Symonds Street, which is listed as a Category I heritage building.

== Family and death ==
His wife died on 2 January 1910 at their home in Jermyn Street (now Anzac Avenue). One of his sons, Arthur Stanley Endean, was killed in the First World War in June 1915.

Endean died on 3 January 1925. His son John Albert Endean died in August 1927, less than three years after him. He had had a heavy involvement in Auckland Rugby League from its beginnings in 1909 until his death in 1927. His son William Phillips "Bill" Endean became a member of parliament in 1930.
