= Symonds Street =

Street in Auckland, New Zealand

Coordinates: 36.856°S 174.766°E

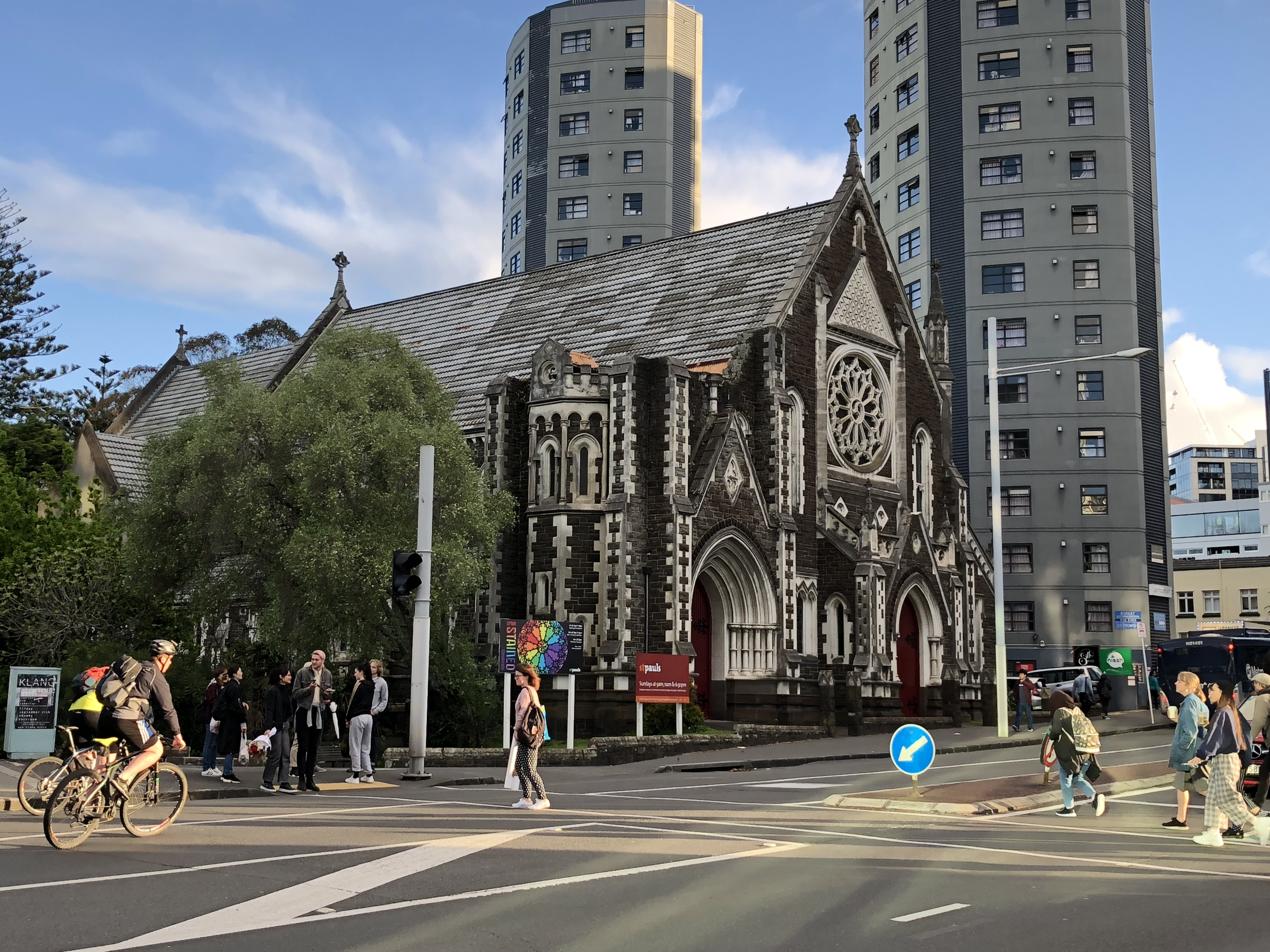
- St Paul's Church and residential apartments on Symonds Street
- Length: 2.2 km (1.4 mi)
- Location: Auckland CBD, New Zealand
- Postal code: 1010
- North end: Anzac Avenue, Waterloo Quadrant
- South end: Mount Eden Road, New North Road

Symonds Street is a street in Auckland, New Zealand's most populous city. The road runs southwest and uphill from the top of Anzac Avenue (originally Jermyn Street), through the City Campus of University of Auckland, over the Northwestern Motorway and Auckland Southern Motorway and to the start of New North Road and Mount Eden Road.

== History ==
The route of Symonds Street originated as a Tāmaki Māori overland walking track, linking the Horotiu valley (modern-day Auckland CBD) and the Waitematā Harbour with other populated areas of the Tāmaki isthmus to the south.

During the early colonial era of Auckland, it was the main south-bound road. It was named after William Cornwallis Symonds in 1842, soon after his death.

== Demographics ==
The statistical areas of Auckland-University, Symonds Street North West, Symonds Street West and Symonds Street East encompass the area east of Queen Street and west of Grafton Gully, including the city campuses of the University of Auckland and Auckland University of Technology. They do not include the part of Symonds Street south of SH 1. They cover 0.71 km^{2} (0.27 sq mi) and had an estimated population of 9,760 as of June 2025, with a population density of 13,746 people per km^{2}.

Historical population
Year	Pop.	±% p.a.
2006	4,797	—
2013	7,260	+6.10%
2018	7,863	+1.61%
2023	8,409	+1.35%

Auckland-University had a population of 8,409 in the 2023 New Zealand census, an increase of 546 people (6.9%) since the 2018 census, and an increase of 1,149 people (15.8%) since the 2013 census. There were 4,032 males, 4,260 females and 117 people of other genders in 3,942 dwellings. 12.1% of people identified as LGBTIQ+. There were 318 people (3.8%) aged under 15 years, 5,121 (60.9%) aged 15 to 29, 2,775 (33.0%) aged 30 to 64, and 195 (2.3%) aged 65 or older.

People could identify as more than one ethnicity. The results were 30.8% European (Pākehā); 8.1% Māori; 5.0% Pasifika; 58.4% Asian; 6.3% Middle Eastern, Latin American and African New Zealanders (MELAA); and 1.3% other, which includes people giving their ethnicity as "New Zealander". English was spoken by 94.1%, Māori language by 2.2%, Samoan by 0.9%, and other languages by 50.0%. No language could be spoken by 1.0% (e.g. too young to talk). New Zealand Sign Language was known by 0.3%. The percentage of people born overseas was 67.5, compared with 28.8% nationally.

Religious affiliations were 21.4% Christian, 5.7% Hindu, 4.5% Islam, 0.6% Māori religious beliefs, 4.6% Buddhist, 0.4% New Age, 0.2% Jewish, and 1.8% other religions. People who answered that they had no religion were 56.0%, and 4.7% of people did not answer the census question.

Of those at least 15 years old, 3,063 (37.9%) people had a bachelor's or higher degree, 3,303 (40.8%) had a post-high school certificate or diploma, and 1,734 (21.4%) people exclusively held high school qualifications. 405 people (5.0%) earned over $100,000 compared to 12.1% nationally. The employment status of those at least 15 was that 3,003 (37.1%) people were employed full-time, 1,401 (17.3%) were part-time, and 561 (6.9%) were unemployed.

Individual statistical areas
Name	Area (km^{2})	Population	Density (per km^{2})	Dwellings	Median age	Median income
Auckland-University	0.37	132	357	99	32.5 years	$40,100
Symonds Street North West	0.09	2,907	32,300	1,515	24.6 years	$18,800
Symonds Street West	0.15	3,162	21,080	1,623	28.1 years	$26,300
Symonds Street East	0.10	2,208	22,080	705	22.7 years	$13,000
New Zealand					38.1 years	$41,500

== Notable locations ==
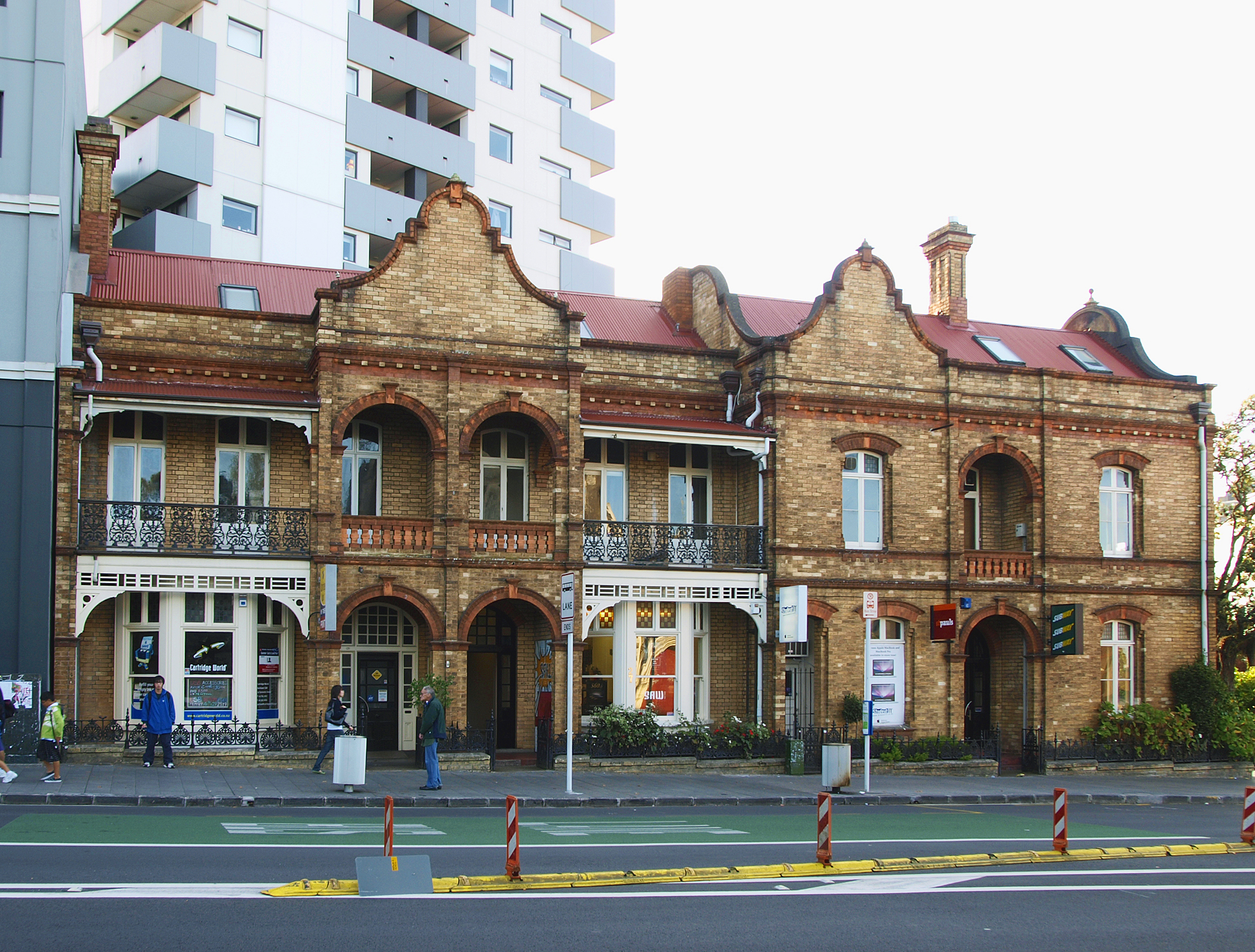
Terrace Houses

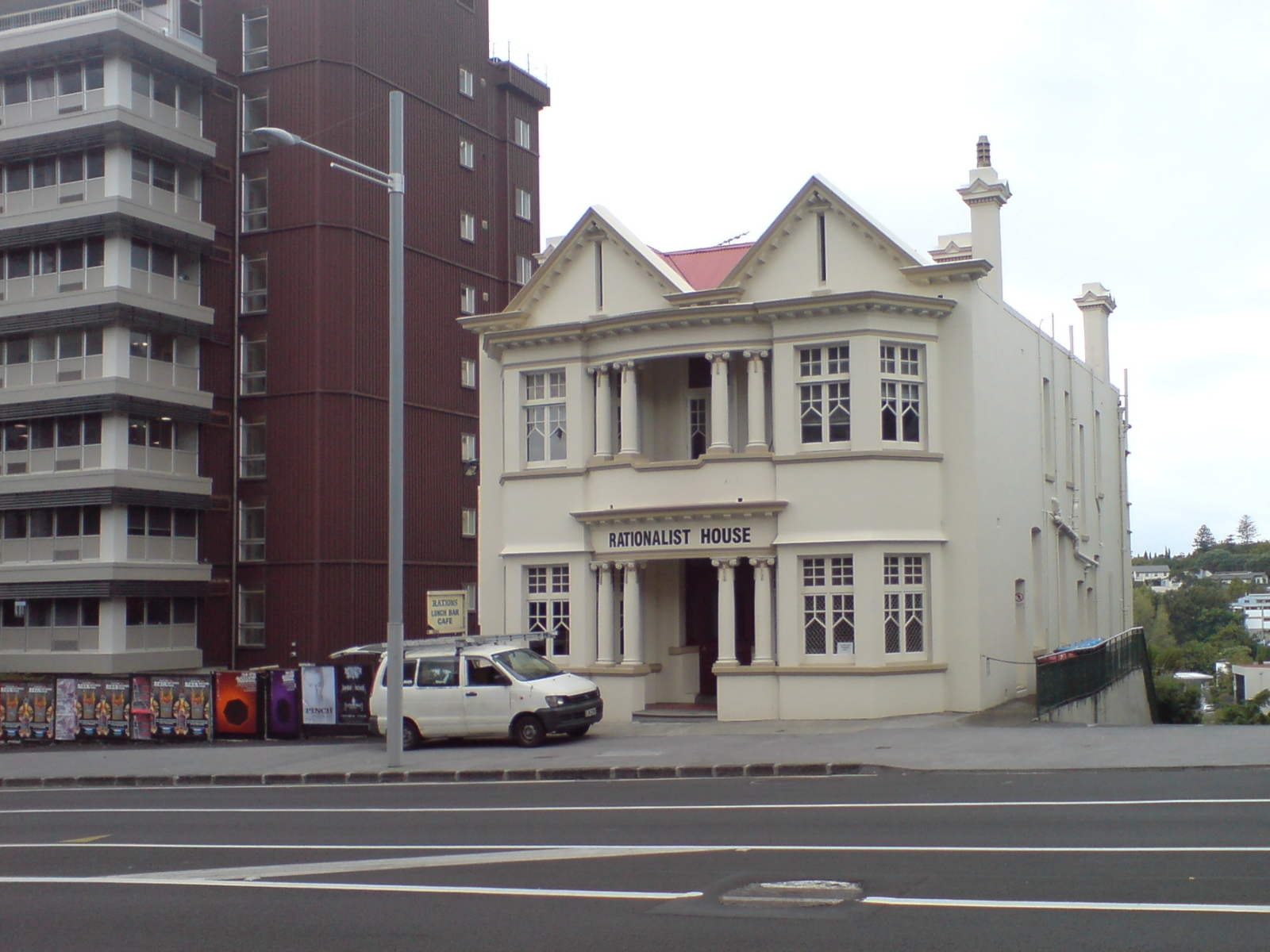
Rationalist House

- St Andrew's First Presbyterian Church, 2 Symonds St, 1850, oldest surviving church in Auckland.
- Belgrave, 12 Symonds St, 1885, Two-storey Italianate house, now part of the University of Auckland.
- House, 14 Symonds St, 1884, Two-storey Italianate house, now part of the University of Auckland.
- House, 16 Symonds St, 1884, Two-storey Italianate house, now part of the University of Auckland.
- Old Choral Hall, 5–7 Symonds St, 1872, A concert chamber and public hall, now part of the University of Auckland.
- St Paul's Church, 28 Symonds St, 1895, Anglican church built on the site of the first church in Auckland.
- Terrace Houses, 25–29 Symonds St, c.1897, private dwelling built by John Endean.
- Aickin House, 39 Symonds St, 1920s neo-Georgian house.
- New Zealand Wars memorial, corner Symonds St and Wakefield St, 1920, memorial to those who fought on the British side in the 19th century wars.
- Cintra Flats, 9–13 Whitaker Place, 1936, apartment complex.
- Rationalist House, 64 Symonds St, purchased in 1960 by the Rationalist Association as a base and library.
- Doctors Residences, 84–86 Symonds St, 1935–1937, residences of two doctors designed by the same architect.
- Plummer House, 5 City Road, 1909, residence of hat manufacturer and musician Charles Plummer.
- Bus Shelter and Toilets, corner Symonds St and Grafton Bridge, 1910, bus shelter and public toilets.
- Symonds Street Cemetery, 120 Symonds St, 1841, one of Auckland's oldest cemeteries.
- Grafton Bridge, 1910, largest single-span of reinforced concrete in the world at the time of construction.
- Karangahape Rocks, a 1969 sculpture by Greer Twiss at Pigeon Park, on the corner of Symonds Street and Karangahape Road
- St Benedict's Church, 1 St Benedicts St, 1888, Gothic church building, possibly the largest in New Zealand at the time of construction.
- Stables, 32 St Benedicts St, 1883, originally part of a larger complex hosting at least 30 Clydesdale horses.
- Upper Symonds Street Historic Area, an area covering Symonds Street south of the Southern Motorway, and adjacent parts of Kyhber Pass Road, Newton Road, Mt Eden Road and New North Road.
