= Old Choral Hall =

19th century building in Auckland, New Zealand

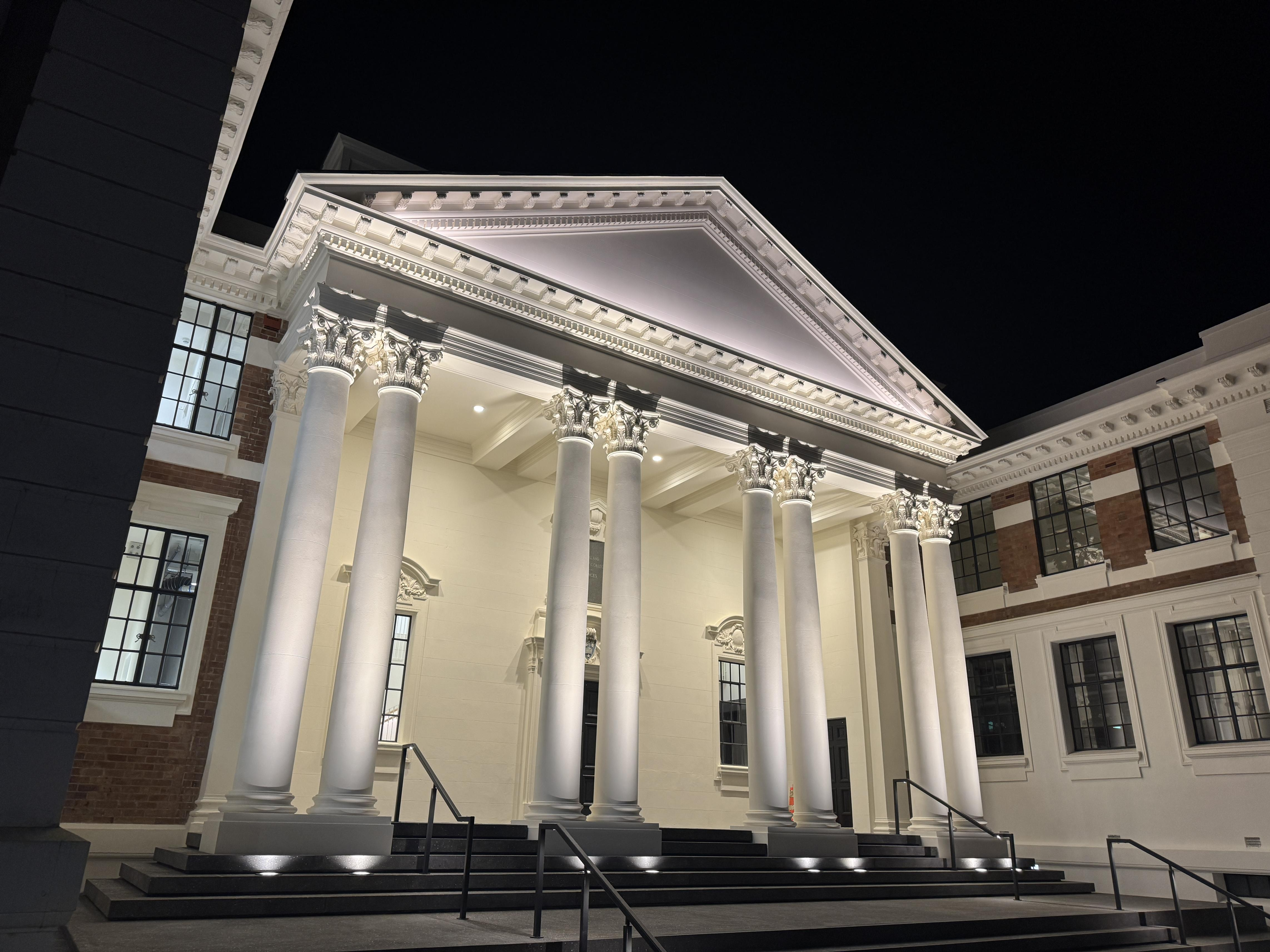
- The Old Choral Hall with re-created portico, 2025

General information
- Architectural style: Neoclassical
- Location: Symonds Street, 5-7 Symonds Street and Alfred Street, Auckland, Auckland, New Zealand
- Coordinates: 36°51′05″S 174°46′13″E
- Year built: 1872
- Owner: University of Auckland

Design and construction
- Architect: Edward Mahoney

Heritage New Zealand – Category 1
- Designated: 6 June 1990
- Reference no.: 4474

The Old Choral Hall is a historic choral hall located on Symonds Street, Auckland, New Zealand. It is registered as a category 1 building by Heritage New Zealand.

Constructed in 1872 to a neoclassical design by Edward Mahoney to serve the Auckland Choral Society. The building functioned as a public hall and concert venue until the opening of the Auckland Town Hall in 1911. Shortly before the First World War the Auckland University College purchased the building and expanded it via construction of two wings. The University of Auckland continue to own and use the building.

Following the Napier earthquake in 1931, the portico was removed over concerns it could collapse. The building had its portico restored in 2025 as part of a restoration and seismic strengthening.

== Description ==
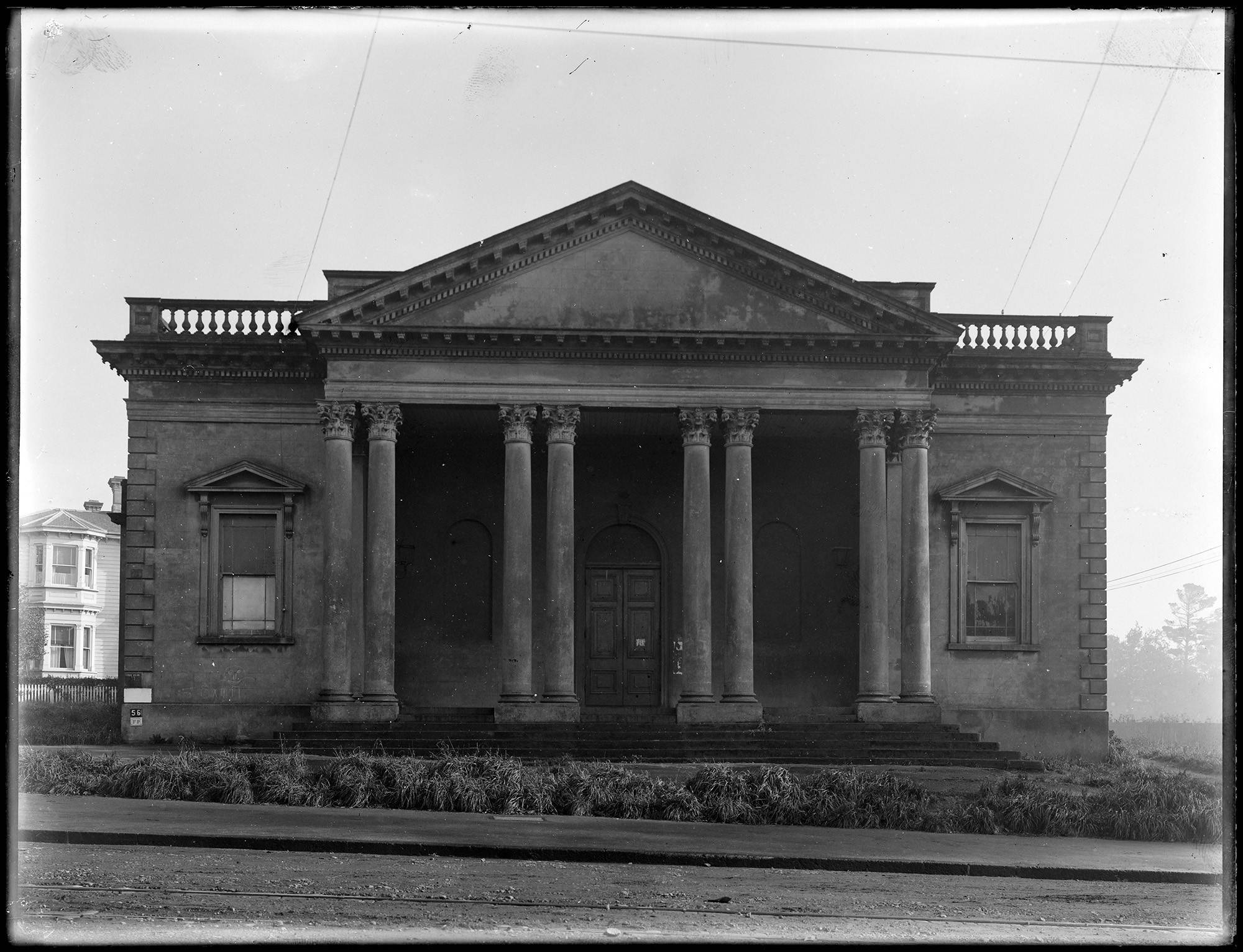
The Old Choral Hall in 1917

The Old Choral Hall is a neoclassical building flanked by two Edwardian Baroque wings. it has timber framed side walls and brick end walls. with a timber framed roof and longrun steel cladding. The flooring is timber and the entrance steps are made from bluestone.

The extension wings are made from reinforced concrete and brick with concrete slabs flooring. The walls are double bricked. The 1919 wing's end windows are located in aediculae. The aediculae have rusticated pilasters and Doric columns supporting an entablature and pediment.

The grand hall was designed to seat up to 1,100 people, although some events saw attendance of up to 2,000. The building has four storeys.

== History ==
The second hall in 1871

The Auckland Choral Society built their first hall on the same site in 1868. The hall burnt down and was replaced with another hall in 1871, which also burnt down. The 1871 hall was built in a similar neoclassical design.

In 1872 the Auckland Choral Society constructed a new brick hall to replace the earlier structures. The hall was designed by Edward Mahoney in a neoclassical style. In 1877 a portico was added, this served as a focal point for the building.

The Auckland University College's music department was using a side hall of the building for lessons in 1888.

Prior to World War One the Old Choral Hall was purchased by the Auckland University College. The college received £4,000 from the government to purchase the hall in 1907.

In 1919 a wing was added on for the science department of the college. Another wing was added in 1925. The 1919 wing was designed by William Arthur Cumming and the 1925 wing was designed by Roy Lippincott. Both wings were in an Edwardian Baroque style.

Following the 1931 Napier earthquake porticoes were considered an earthquake hazard and subsequently the portico of the hall was demolished in the same year. In 2024 work started to restore the portico as part of a wider restoration and seismic retrofit of the entire building. This work was completed in December 2025.

== Significance ==
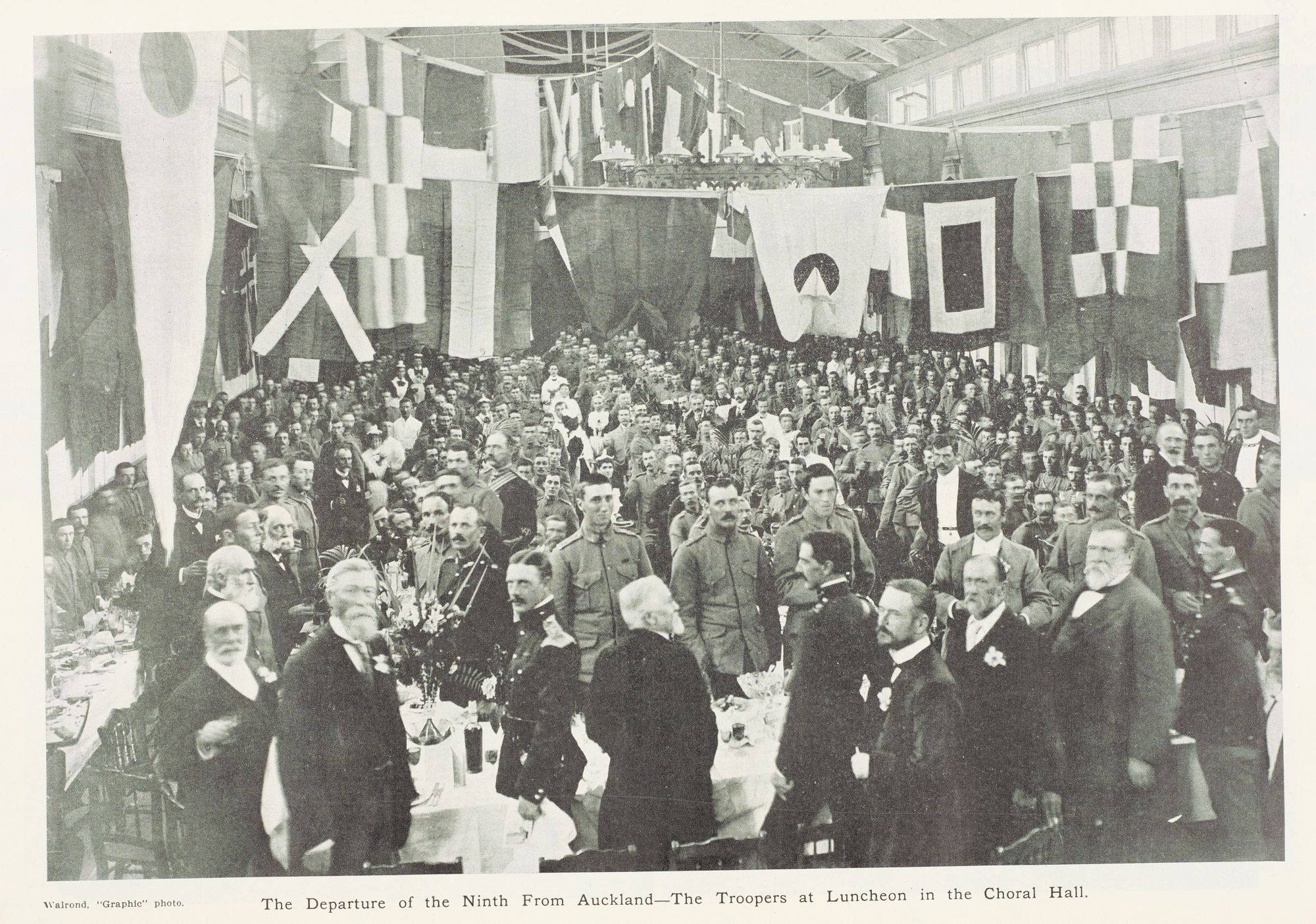
Soldiers at a luncheon in the Old Choral Hall before departing to South Africa to take part in the Second Boer War

The Old Choral Hall is considered a landmark. It has connections to both civic and educational life in Auckland through its many uses over the years. Prior to the opening of the Auckland Town Hall in 1911, the Old Choral Hall served most of its functions, such as concerts, public gatherings, and hosting eminent guests such as the Māori king, Tāwhiao in 1882.

Kate Edger—the first woman to receive a Bachelor of Arts in the British Empire—had her graduation ceremony at the Old Choral Hall.
