= Karangahape Rocks =

Public sculpture in New Zealand

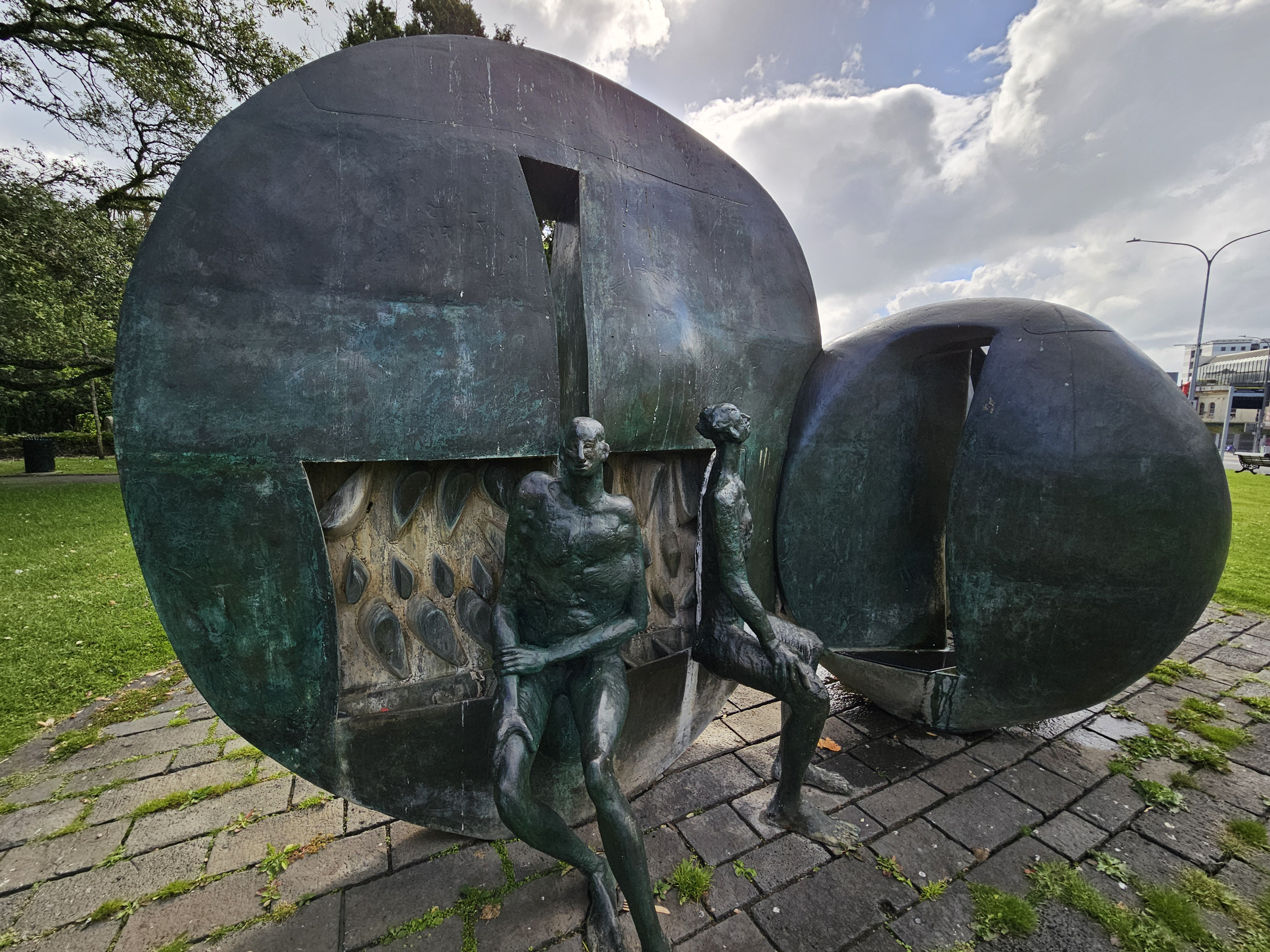
- Karangahape Rocks in 2023
- Artist: Greer Twiss
- Completion date: 1969
- Medium: bronze, steel, concrete foundation
- Dimensions: 2.5 m × 7.8 m × 1.55 m (98 in × 310 in × 61 in)
- Location: Pigeon Park, corner of Karangahape Road and Symonds Street, Auckland, New Zealand; 36°51′31″S 174°45′47″E
- Owner: Auckland Council Art Collection
- Website: Auckland Public Art page

Karangahape Rocks, also known as the Karangahape Road Fountain, is a public sculpture located in Pigeon Park on Karangahape Road in Auckland, New Zealand, created by New Zealand sculptor Greer Twiss as his first large-scale public commission. The sculpture, formerly a working fountain, depicts three bronze spherical shapes and two seated figures. Unveiled in 1969, the piece is one of the earliest contemporary public sculptures in Auckland.

== Commission ==
After sculptor Greer Twiss returned from England to New Zealand in 1966, the Auckland City Council commissioned Twiss to create an artwork for Pigeon Park that incorporated water. The cost associated with the council commissioning the artwork drew controversy among Aucklanders at the time. The piece was Twiss' first large-scale public artwork.

== Design and construction ==
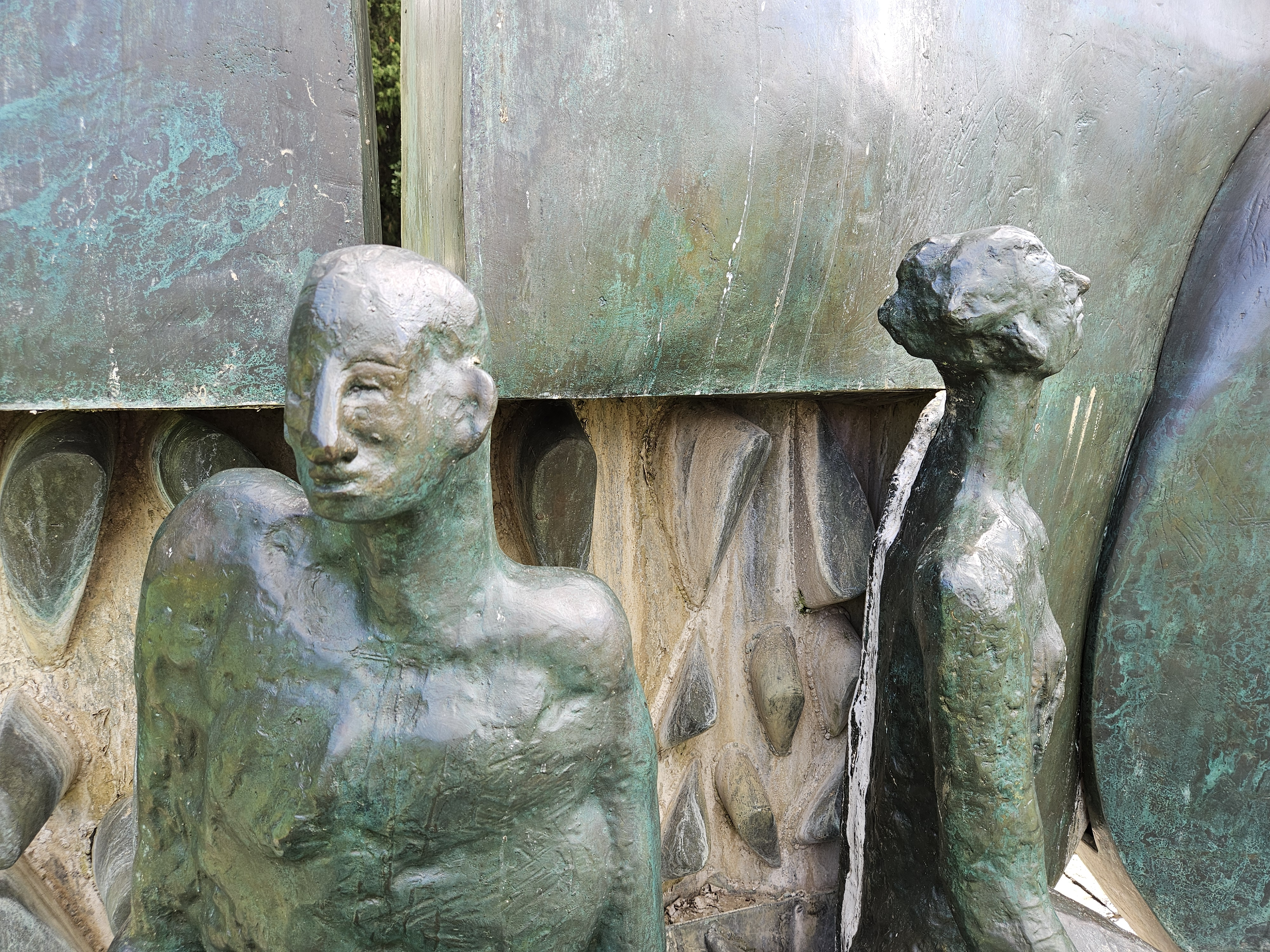
Close-up of the seated figures and internal space where water flows

The artwork features one large and two smaller bronze "rocks", or spherical discs. Two figures are seated on the larger disc, gazing out at their surrounding environment. The sculpture incorporates water elements; but compared to typical fountains, Twiss wanted to create a work where water was fully enclosed in the piece, that would not spray into the surrounding area on windy days. The sculpture incorporates small grooves, which are intended as a space where water flows. Twiss was inspired by the form of water-smoothed stones of a river or foreshore when creating the spherical shapes.

Twiss described the construction process for the work as "traumatic". Creating the casts for the piece took Twiss from 1966 until the middle of 1967 to complete, made harder as there were no available bronze casting facilities available in New Zealand. Twiss injured himself twice during the construction process, first breaking ribs and later damaging his foot when a piece of the sculpture fell on him. Twiss felt unable to visit the sculpture due to the difficult creation process, first visiting the sculpture in 1970, a year after it was unveiled.

When asked about the piece, Twiss described the work as "a rocky seaside of water and rocks, with people sitting beside them", and "a memory of sitting by a rocky bank, a soft gurgle of flowing water." For the sculpture's water element, Twiss wanted to "get away from the conventional idea of a fountain as a piece of sculpture set in a pool".

== History ==
The sculpture was unveiled in Pigeon Park in April 1969, in a ceremony where mayor Dove-Myer Robinson switched on the fountain. It was one of the first contemporary public sculptures unveiled in New Zealand, and was pivotal in establishing Twiss' career as a sculptor in New Zealand. Karangahape Rocks marked a turning point in Twiss' career, moving away from figurative works towards literal works.

Over time, the bronze piece has weathered, creating a green patina on the surface of the sculpture. The piece's water feature broke in the late 1980s. Plans for the water elements of the piece to be restored began in 2005, and the sculpture was repaired in 2012. Local historian Edward Bennett notes that when the piece was broken, few people realised that Karangahape Rocks was a fountain, as its water elements were so hidden.

== Reception ==
Karangahape Rocks was described by art historian Robin Woodward as "one of the most successfully integrated sculptures in any urban environment in the country." Both art historian Michael Dunn and local historian Edward Bennett identified influences of English sculptors Henry Moore and Barbara Hepworth; Dunn likening the work to Moore's Seated Figure Against Curved Wall (1957). Dunn believed that by perforating the discs, Twiss was more able to integrate Karangahape Rocks with the surrounding environment. Art advocate Roy Dunningham and writer Andrew Paul Wood both interpret the figures as people waiting for a bus, with Wood likening the scene to the play Waiting for Godot.

Artist Lisa Reihana cited Karangahape Rocks as one of her favourite Auckland sculptures.
