= Anzac Avenue, Auckland =

Urban road of Auckland, New Zealand

Coordinates: 36.8489°S 174.7735°E

Anzac Avenue
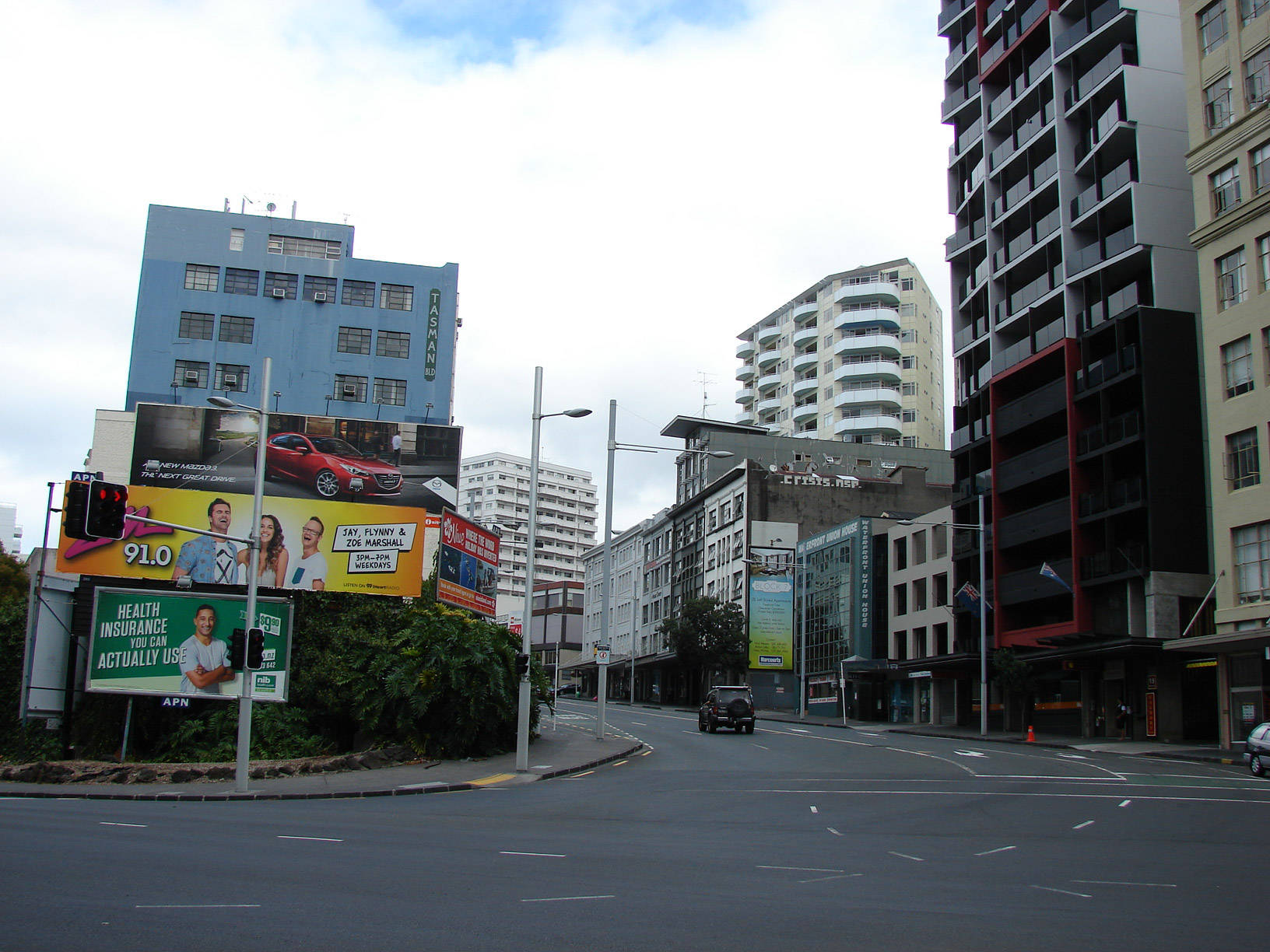
- Length: 0.6 km (0.37 mi)
- Location: Auckland CBD, New Zealand
- Postal code: 1010
- North end: Beach Road
- South end: Symonds Street

Anzac Avenue is a street in Auckland, New Zealand's most populous city. It was constructed between 1914 and 1919 to link Beach Road to Symonds Street, and was named as a memorial to the troops who died in the Gallipoli campaign.

== History ==
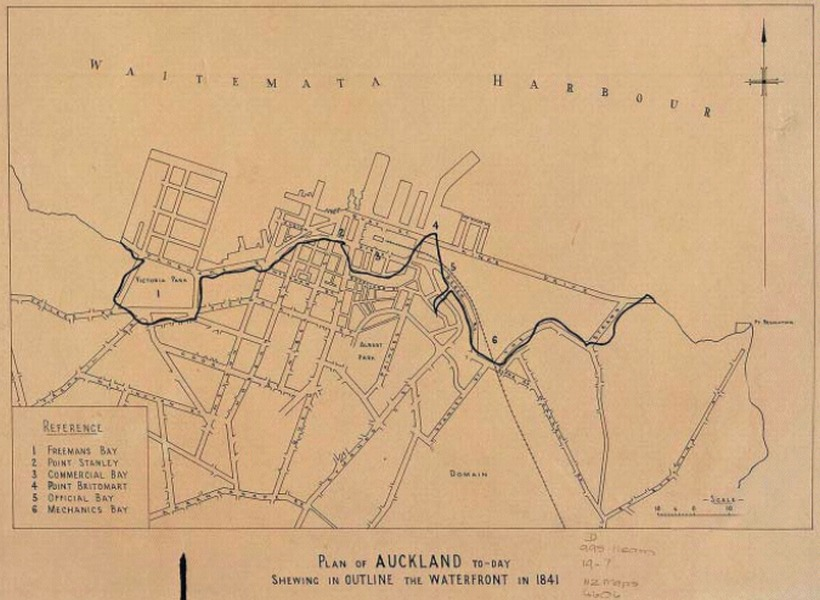
The Auckland waterfront circa 1930, with the older coastline of 1841 also shown as a darker line, showing Anzac Avenue.

Anzac Avenue and neighbouring Beach Road follow the shape of the original shoreline of the Auckland waterfront, leading from Symonds Street towards the Point Britomart headland, passing alongside Official Bay and Mechanics Bay. Land reclamations of the harbour began in the 1860s, changing the landscape. Anzac Avenue was originally the location of Te Hororoa Pā, a name which name refers to an incident where part of the pā site slipped into the ocean. In the 1740s, the Waiōhua settlement at Te Hororoa was one of the final to fall during Waiohua's defeat to Ngāti Whātua.

Anzac Avenue, which started construction in 1914, followed the route of Jermyn Street, but was renamed in 1916 to form a memorial to those who had died at Gallipoli, overriding a recommendation to call it Jellicoe Street. There was an objection to the renaming, because the previous name honoured Captain John Jermyn Symonds, an early resident of the street and figure in the early history of Auckland. A commemoration of the construction of the road was held in 1918, where the Governor-General, Arthur Foljambe, planted two pūriri trees at the corner of Anzac Avenue and Waterloo Quadrant, and a score of trees were planted by others. The road was described as busy in 1919 even before it was fully completed. A tramline along Anzac Avenue was opened in February 1921.

== Demographics ==
The statistical area of Anzac Avenue, which is bounded by Beach Road, Parliament Street, Waterloo Quadrant, Princes Street and Emily Place, covers 0.10 km^{2} (0.039 sq mi) and had an estimated population of 3,370 as of June 2025, with a population density of 33,700 people per km^{2}.

Historical population
Year	Pop.	±% p.a.
2006	2,124	—
2013	2,568	+2.75%
2018	2,748	+1.36%
2023	2,976	+1.61%

Anzac Avenue had a population of 2,976 in the 2023 New Zealand census, an increase of 228 people (8.3%) since the 2018 census, and an increase of 408 people (15.9%) since the 2013 census. There were 1,494 males, 1,455 females and 24 people of other genders in 1,668 dwellings. 12.1% of people identified as LGBTIQ+. The median age was 31.9 years (compared with 38.1 years nationally). There were 72 people (2.4%) aged under 15 years, 1,215 (40.8%) aged 15 to 29, 1,494 (50.2%) aged 30 to 64, and 195 (6.6%) aged 65 or older.

People could identify as more than one ethnicity. The results were 44.7% European (Pākehā); 7.0% Māori; 3.7% Pasifika; 45.8% Asian; 6.8% Middle Eastern, Latin American and African New Zealanders (MELAA); and 1.9% other, which includes people giving their ethnicity as "New Zealander". English was spoken by 95.2%, Māori language by 1.4%, Samoan by 0.5%, and other languages by 44.5%. No language could be spoken by 0.7% (e.g. too young to talk). New Zealand Sign Language was known by 0.3%. The percentage of people born overseas was 62.5, compared with 28.8% nationally.

Religious affiliations were 20.5% Christian, 5.3% Hindu, 3.2% Islam, 0.3% Māori religious beliefs, 3.2% Buddhist, 0.3% New Age, 0.1% Jewish, and 1.7% other religions. People who answered that they had no religion were 60.0%, and 5.4% of people did not answer the census question.

Of those at least 15 years old, 1,524 (52.5%) people had a bachelor's or higher degree, 864 (29.8%) had a post-high school certificate or diploma, and 513 (17.7%) people exclusively held high school qualifications. The median income was $48,300, compared with $41,500 nationally. 462 people (15.9%) earned over $100,000 compared to 12.1% nationally. The employment status of those at least 15 was that 1,725 (59.4%) people were employed full-time, 381 (13.1%) were part-time, and 126 (4.3%) were unemployed.

== Notable locations ==
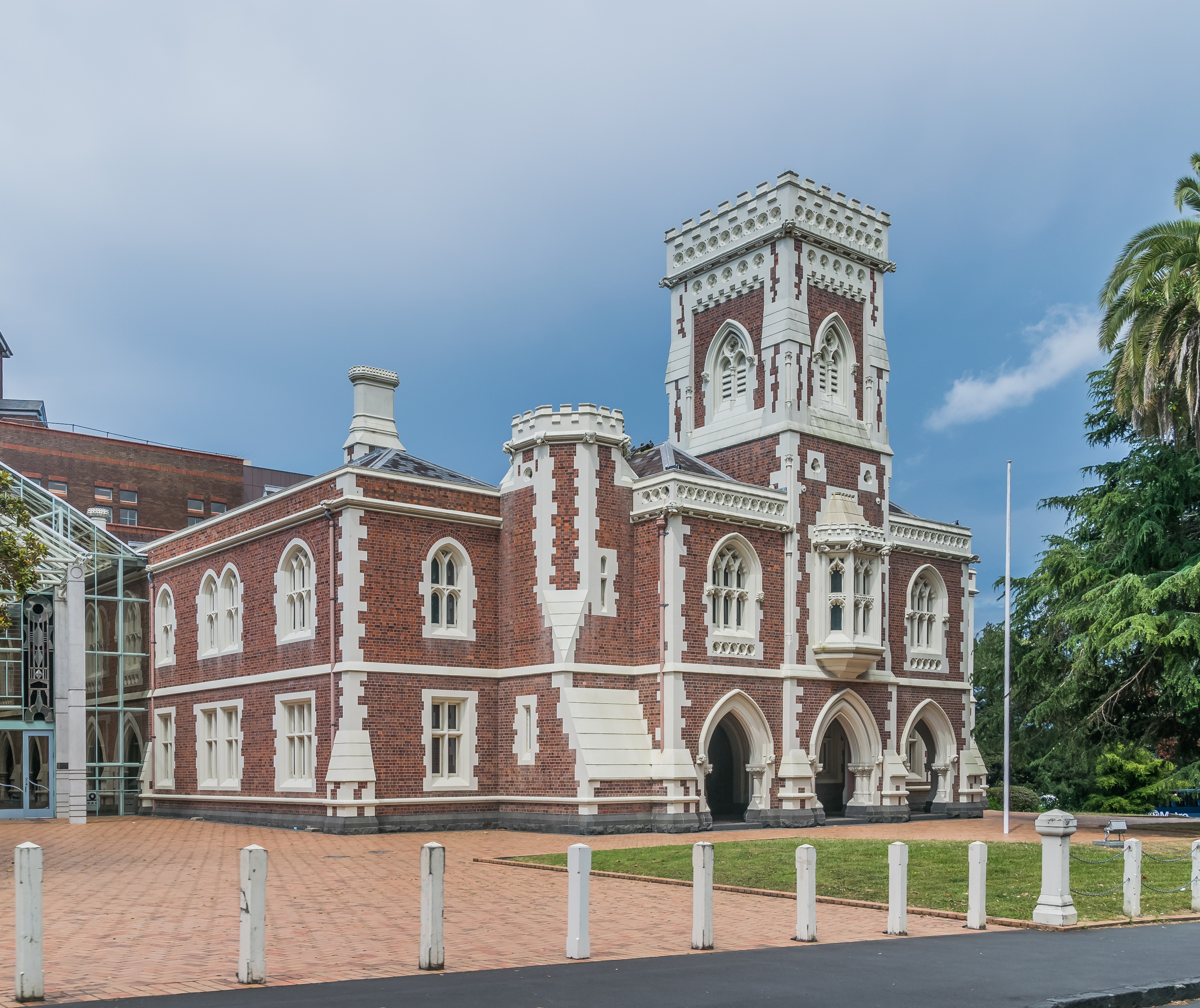
High Court Building (formerly Supreme Court Building)

- Brooklyn Flats, 66–70 Emily Place, 1936, apartment block.
- Eden Hall, 3 Eden Crescent, 1936, apartment block.
- Logan Bank, 114 Anzac Avenue, 1917, remnants of a house built 1871 and occupied by John Logan Campbell, used as support for the construction of Anzac Avenue.
- Station Hotel, 122 Anzac Avenue, 1931, hotel fronting on both Beach Road and Anzac Avenue.
- Berrisville Flats, 152 Anzac Avenue, 1937, apartment block.
- High Court Building, corner Anzac Avenue and Waterloo Crescent, 1868, originally the Supreme Court building, built in Gothic Revival style.
- Braemar, 7 Parliament Street, 1901, apartment complex.
- Middle Courtville, 9 Parliament Street, 1914, apartment complex.
- Corner Courtville, 11 Parliament Street, 1919, apartment complex.
