= Greer Twiss =

New Zealand artist and sculptor (1937–2025)

Greer Twiss ONZM
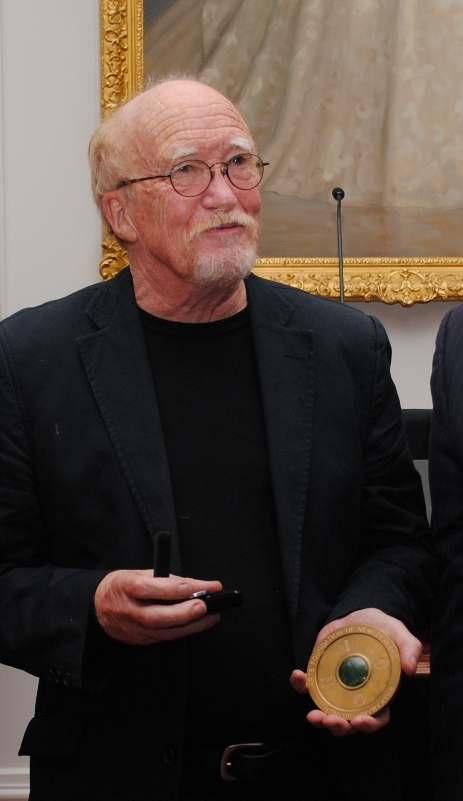
- Twiss receiving an Arts Foundation Icon Award in 2011
- Born: Greer Lascelles Twiss; 23 June 1937; Auckland, New Zealand
- Died: 17 July 2025 (aged 88); Auckland, New Zealand
- Education: Elam School of Fine Arts
- Known for: Sculpture

Greer Lascelles Twiss ONZM (23 June 1937 – 17 July 2025) was a New Zealand sculptor, and in 2011 was the recipient of an Icon Award from the Arts Foundation of New Zealand, limited to 20 living art-makers.

== Life and career ==
Twiss was born in Auckland on 23 June 1937, taking up sculpture in the 1950s. He graduated from Elam School of Fine Arts in 1960 with a Diploma of Fine Arts with honours. In 1965, he received a QEII Arts Council Travel Grant, which he used to study lost-wax casting in Europe. He is best known for his works in bronze. In 1966, he was appointed a lecturer at Elam, and he eventually became the head of sculpture there in 1974. He retired in 1998.

Twiss primarily focused on life-sized sculptures in the 1960s, including the fibreglass series Frozen Frames, and the 1969 bronze sculpture and fountain Karangahape Rocks. By the 1970s, Twiss began focusing on creating works that sound freestand within gallery spaces. Works such as Barriers Site/Sight Works and Tripods are pieces which date from the mid-1970s, which explore spatial definition.

In 1989, Twiss spent two months living in Europe, inspired to utilise the ideas he had developed there in his later works, such as Scene One Act One, a work where Twiss explored the differences between expectations of travel and reality.

Twiss died in Auckland on 17 July 2025, at the age of 88.

== Works ==
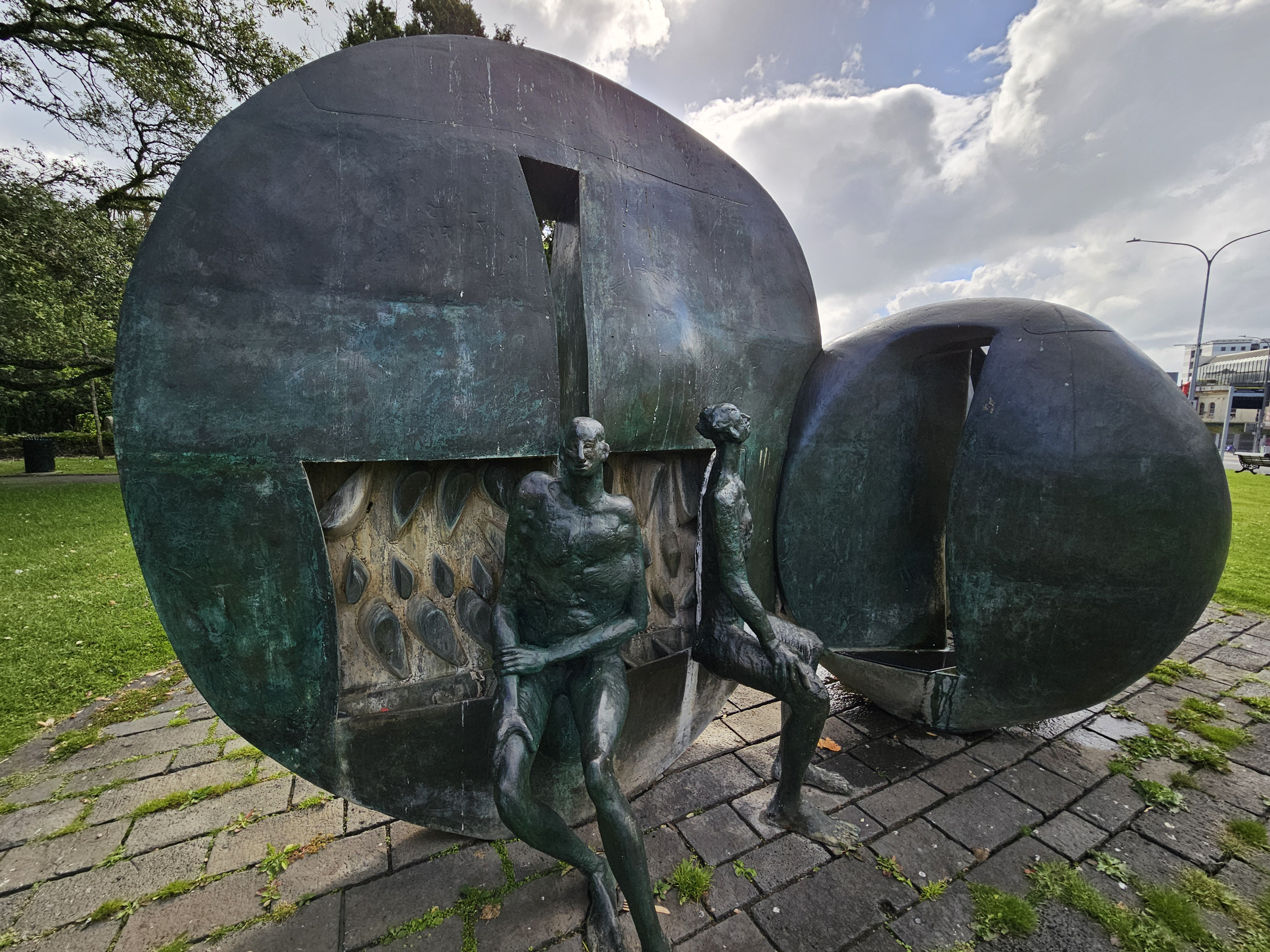
Karangahape Rocks (also known as the Karangahape Road Fountain), a 1969 bronze sculpture by Twiss on Karangahape Road

His works are in the Auckland Art Gallery Toi o Tāmaki. He participated in many exhibitions including Volume and Form, Singapore; Content/Context at Shed 11 - Museum of New Zealand Te Papa Tongarewa; and Aspects of Recent New Zealand Art, Auckland City Art Gallery. He was the subject of two retrospective presentations by the City Gallery Wellington and by the Auckland Art Gallery. His work, Flight Trainer for Albatross, stands at the entrance of the Auckland viaduct on Princes Wharf. and his large-scale bronze Karangahape Road Fountain has been a fixture of Pigeon Park at the intersection of Karangahape Road and Symonds Street since 1969. A steel and bronze cast work Link is mounted in the Auckland University medical school building.

== Honours and recognition ==
Twiss was a guest contributor to the sculpture park at the Seoul Olympics. In the 2002 Queen's Birthday and Golden Jubilee Honours, Twiss was appointed an Officer of the New Zealand Order of Merit, for services to sculpture. In 2011, he received an Arts Foundation Icon Award.
