= Wikipedian in residence =

Professional role in Wikipedia development

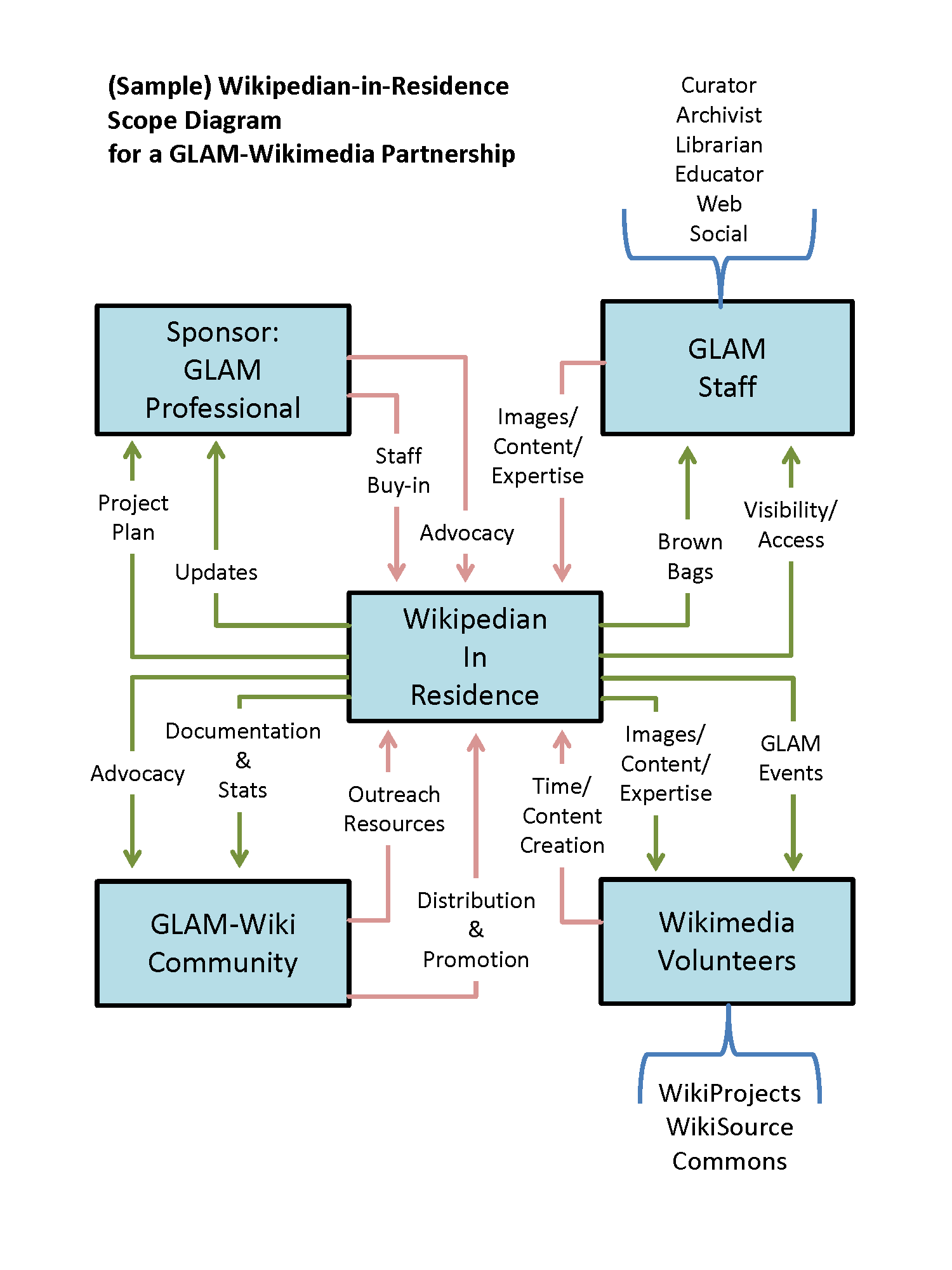
The relationship between a Wikipedian in residence and the community. The diagram represents the stakeholders and what each stakeholder provides and receives in a typical Wikipedian in residence project.

A Wikipedian in residence or Wikimedian in residence (WiR) is a Wikipedia editor, a Wikipedian (or Wikimedian), who accepts a placement with an institution, typically an art gallery, library, archive, museum, cultural institution, learned society, or institute of higher education (such as a university) to facilitate Wikipedia entries related to that institution's mission, encourage and assist it to release material under open licenses, and to develop the relationship between the host institution and the Wikimedia community. A Wikipedian in residence generally helps to coordinate Wikipedia-related outreach events between the GLAM ("galleries, libraries, archives, and museums") and the general public such as edit-a-thons.

Institutions that have hosted a Wikipedian in residence include large institutions like the National Library of Wales, the University of Edinburgh, the British Museum, the National Institute for Occupational Safety and Health, the British Library, the Smithsonian Institution, the Royal Society of Chemistry, UC Berkeley, Columbia University, City University of New York, the Metropolitan New York Library Council, the University of Toronto, the National Library of Norway, and the Federal Archives of Switzerland and smaller venues like the Derby Museum and Art Gallery and The New Art Gallery Walsall in the UK; the Palace of Versailles in France; the Museu Picasso and the Museu Nacional d'Art de Catalunya in Catalonia; the National Book Council and the Times of Malta in Malta; and the Children's Museum of Indianapolis, Consumer Reports, the Gerald R. Ford Presidential Library, and the National Archives and Records Administration in the United States.

== Role and duties ==
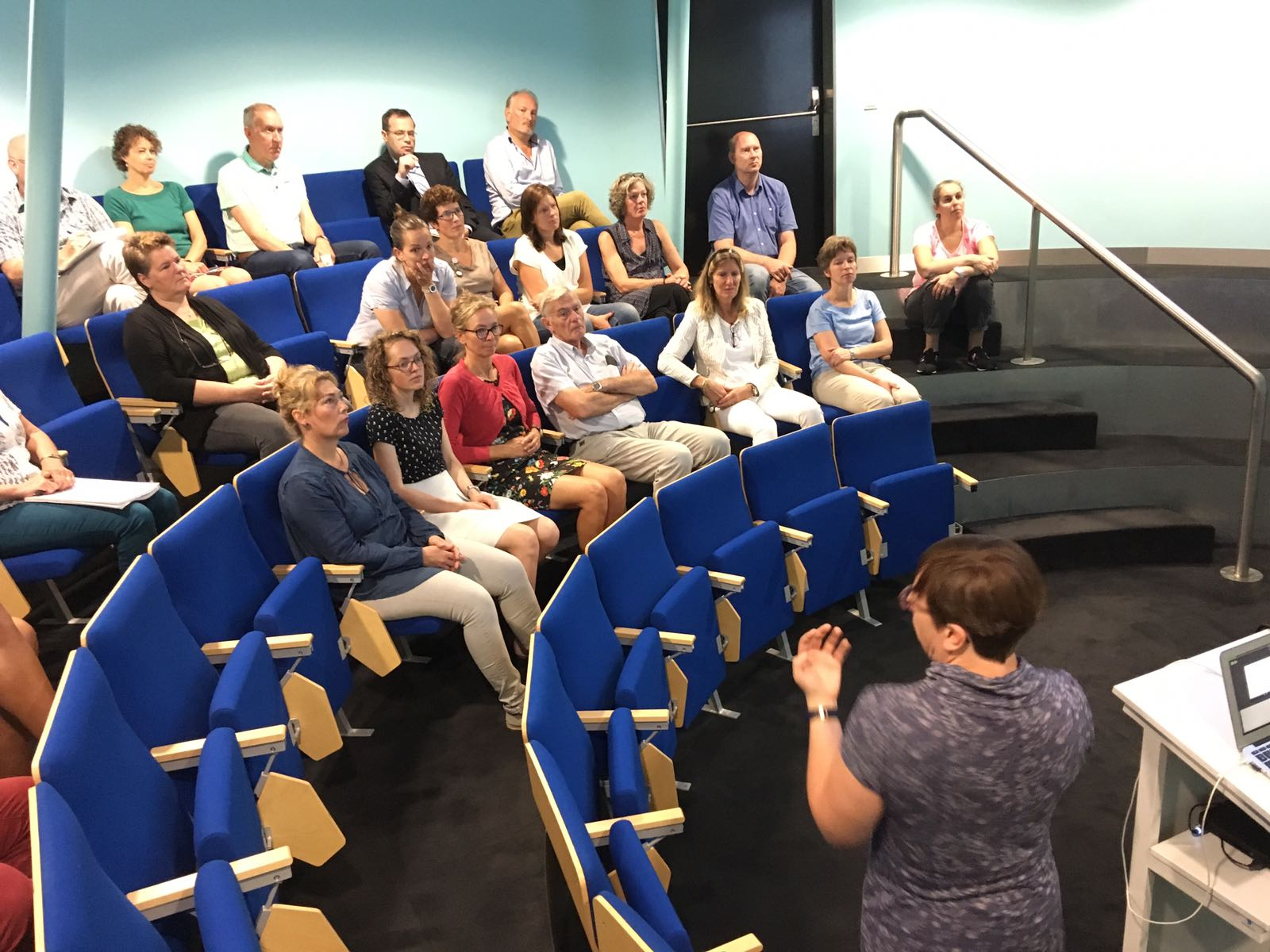
UNESCO Memory of the World WiR talking at the Zeeuws Archief

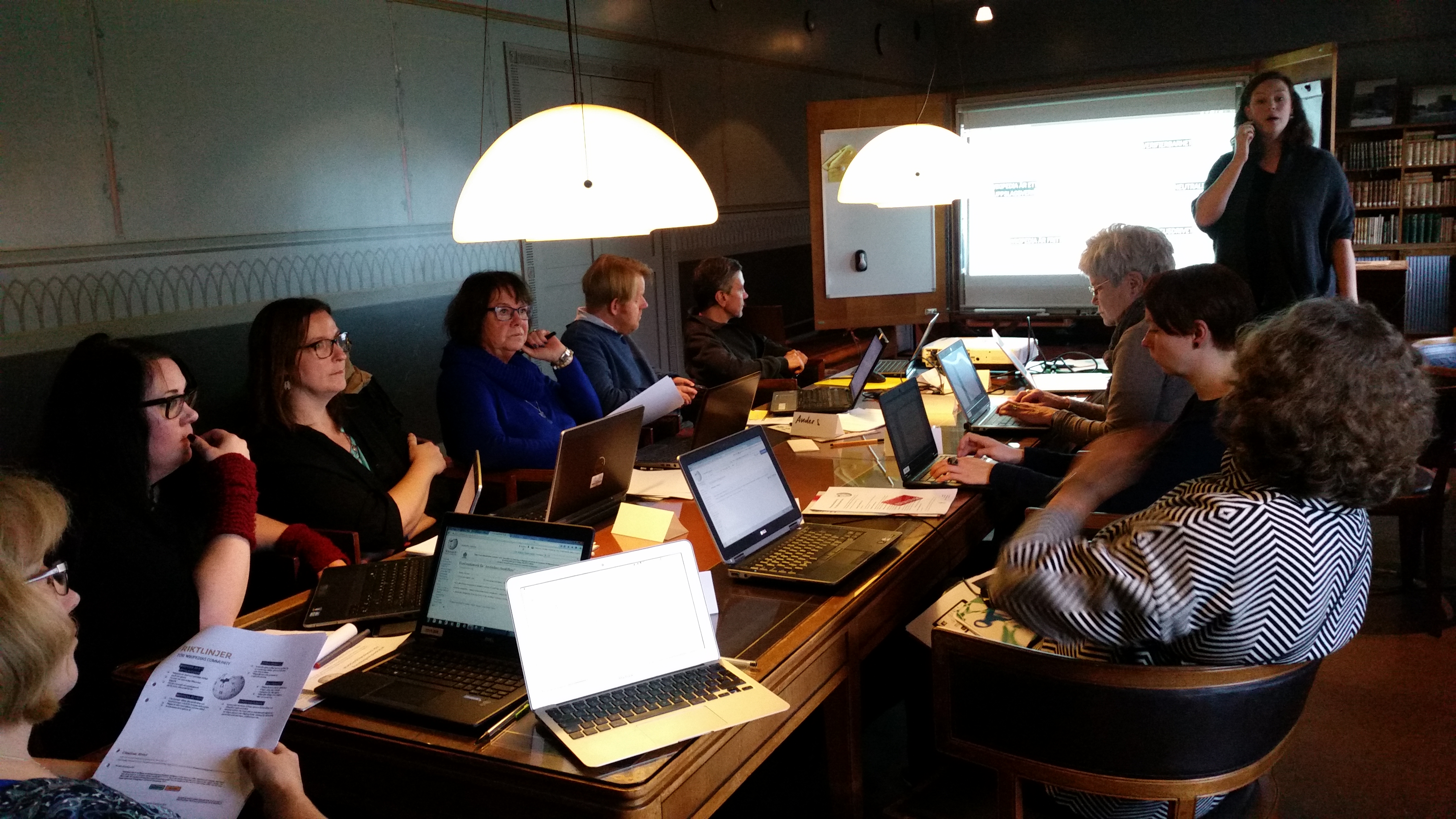
WiR running a training course for librarians in Stockholm

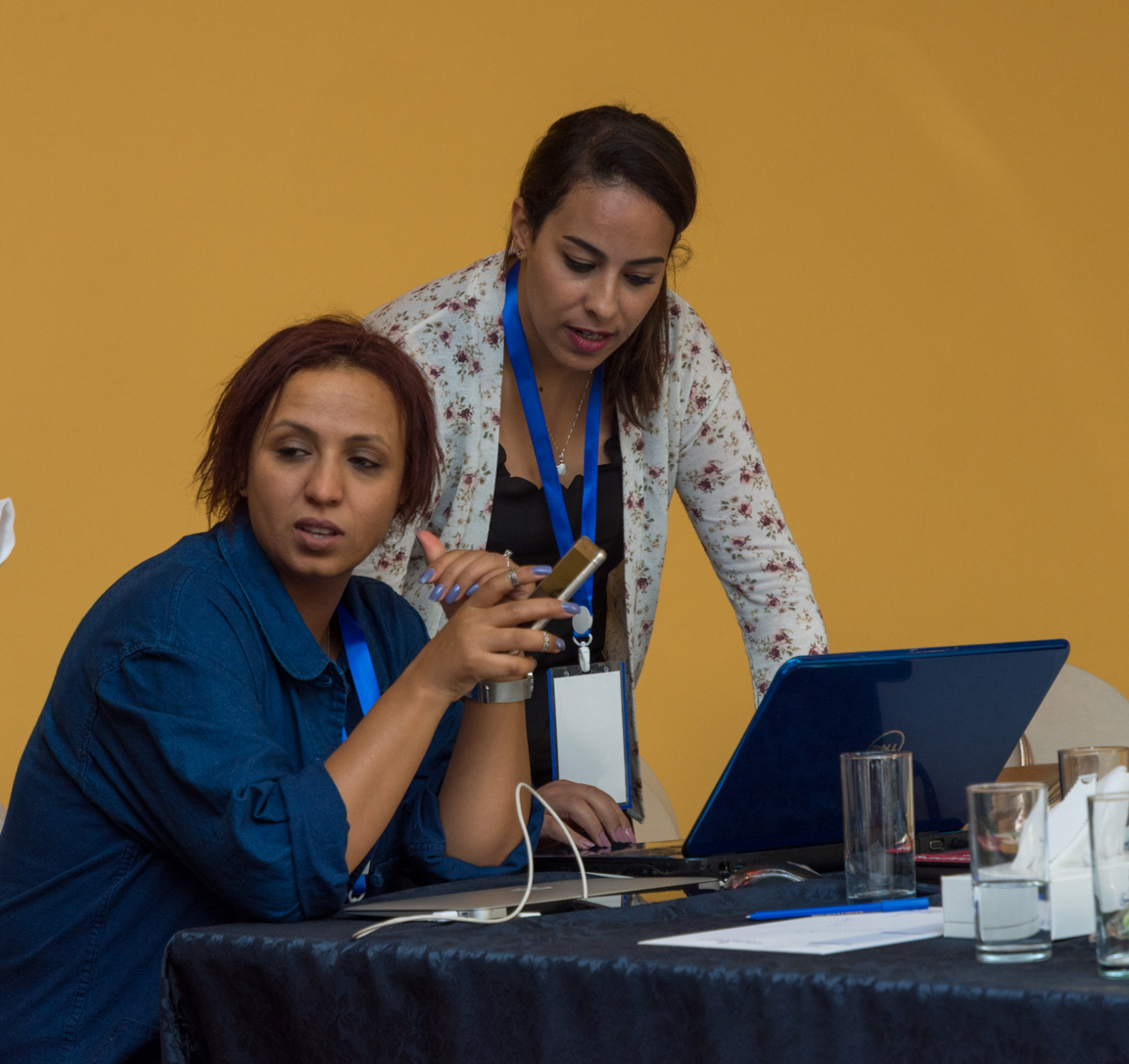
WiRs who are librarians in Tunis

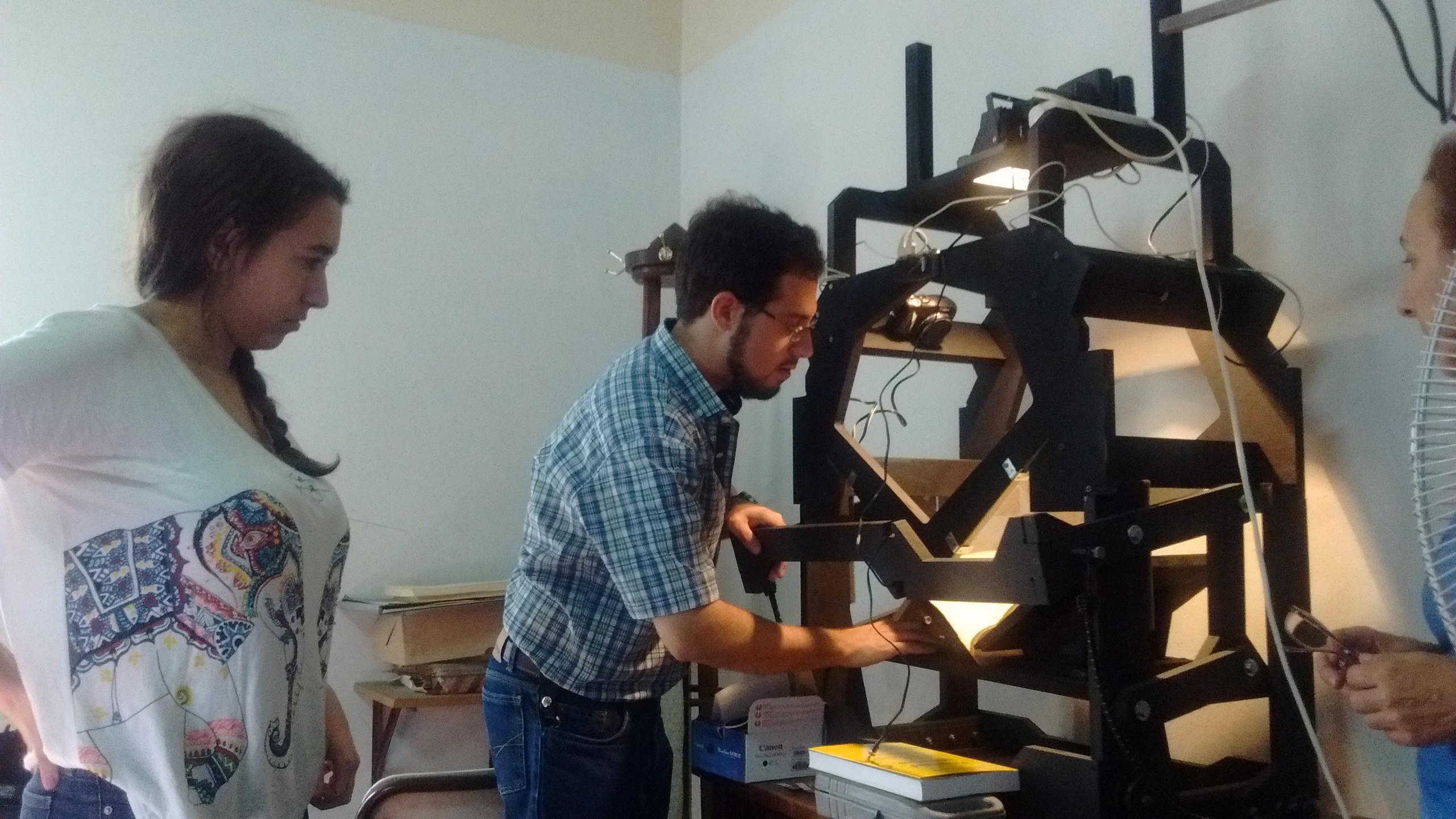
WiR teaching digitization skills at the Archivo Histórico de la Provincia de Buenos Aires

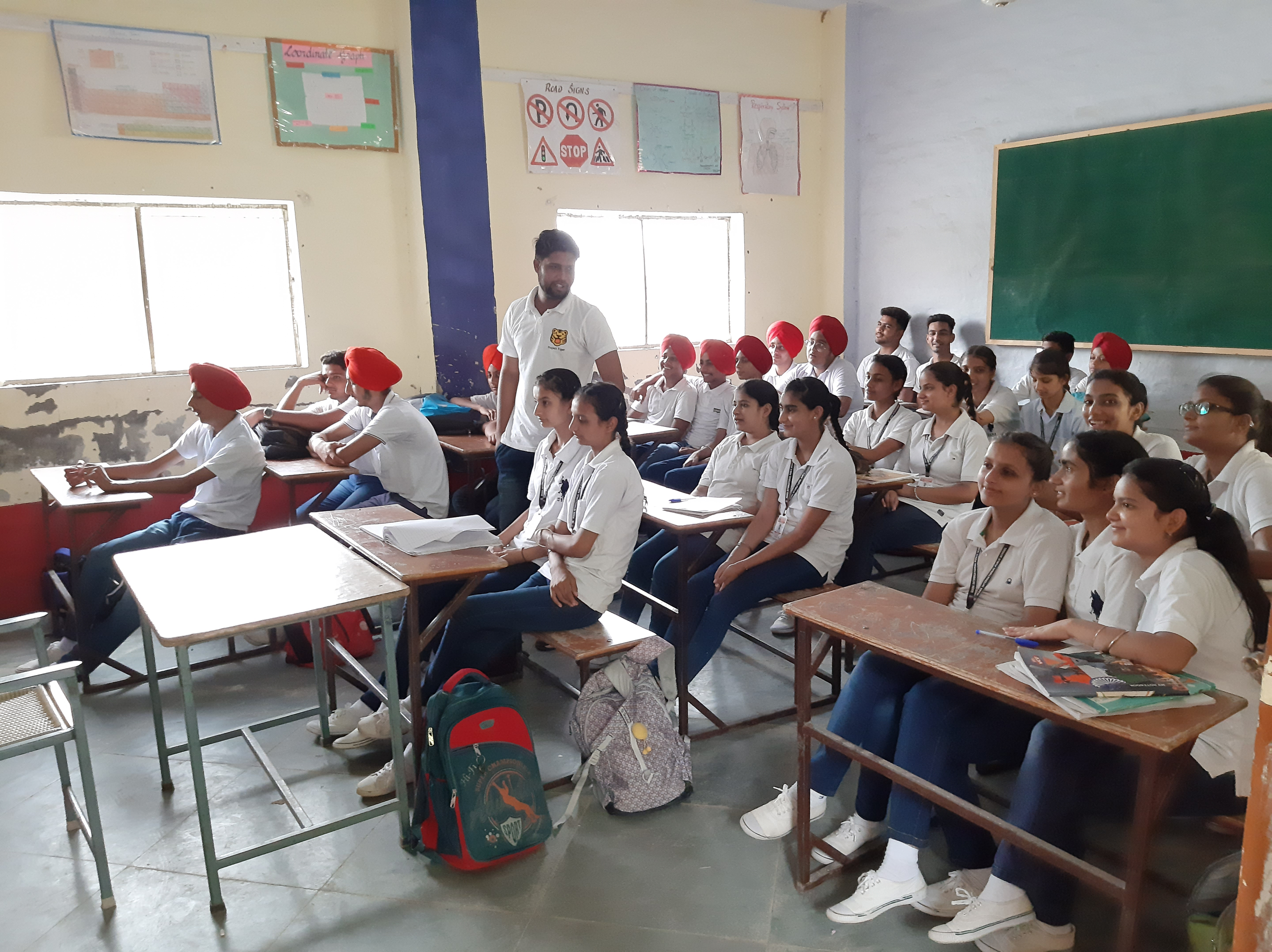
WiR teaching about various WikiProjects to school students

The primary role of the Wikipedian in Residence (WiR) is often to serve as a liaison between the host institution and the Wikimedia community by assisting with events and training that support the missions of both organisations. Typical training duties include arranging and/or leading training events and edit-a-thons and providing explanations to other staff and members of the public about policies and practices, such as policies about conflict of interest. Editing activities may include making contributions to articles relevant to the institution's materials and mission, such as articles about significant cultural objects in an organization's collection, or articles in a specific field of knowledge.

Another common form of collaboration involves digital collections. A WiR can provide training on digitization and help upload media (with any existing metadata) to Wikimedia Commons. Wikimedia volunteers can then translate, extend, and reverify metadata, categorizing media and manually transcribing and structuring scanned documents on Wikisource. The description and categorization functions on Wikimedia Commons are sometimes preferred to those of commercial websites and the institution's catalogue software. Media added to Commons are used in Wikipedia, both by the WiRs and by volunteer editors.

A third form of collaboration involves datasets and APIs in their own right; for instance, the Wikimedia Foundation funded a Wikipedian in Residence at OCLC to integrate the OCLC's WorldCat Search API into Wikipedia's citation autocompletion tools, making adding references faster for Wikipedia editors. WiRs have also helped integrate ORCID metadata and rights statement data. Some WiRs work for only a short period, as little as a few weeks, while others have permanent positions. In the case of short-term positions, it is important that the work to be done be well-planned in advance.

== Compensation ==
While Wikipedia discourages direct paid compensation for article editing and prohibits undisclosed advocacy, Wikipedians in residence are permitted to be compensated for work on-wiki – either by offering credit, stipend, or salary – through their sponsoring institutions provided that they adhere to strict guidelines against engaging in public relations or marketing for their institution.

== Developing interest ==
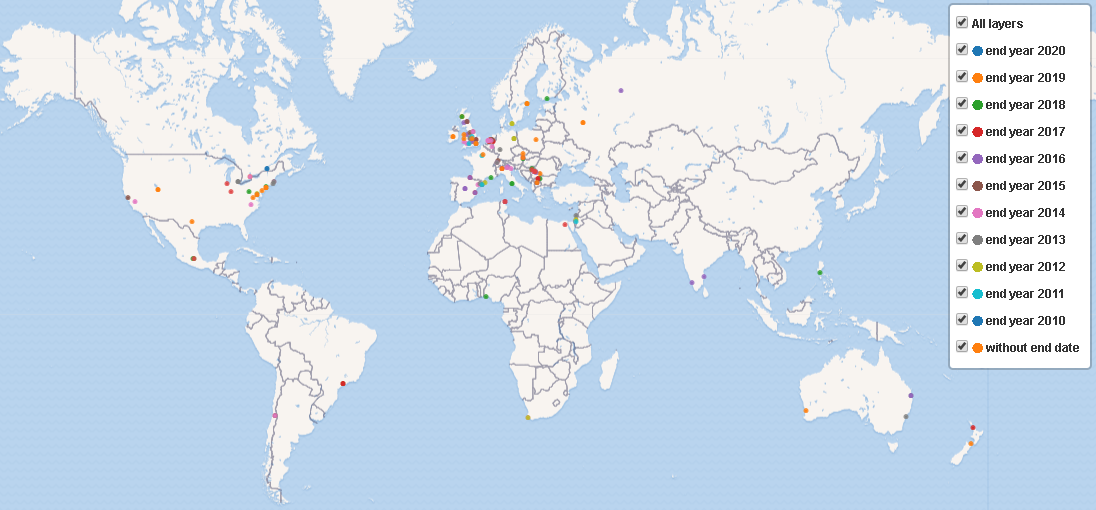
Interactive map of Wikimedians in residence listed, sorted by year

In 2010, Australian Liam Wyatt became the first Wikipedian in Residence when he volunteered at the British Museum for a period of five weeks. He noted the need for Wikipedia to strengthen partnerships with museums to create the most up-to-date and accurate information, saying "we are doing the same thing for the same reason, for the same people, in the same medium. Let's do it together." The Children's Museum of Indianapolis became involved with the program after Wikipedian Lori Phillips volunteered for a GLAM event in 2010, becoming the second Wikipedian in residence. The third, Benoît Evellin, spent six months at the Palace of Versailles in Versailles, France. The Museu Picasso in Barcelona, Spain and the Derby Museum and Art Gallery in Derby, England were also early adopters of the idea.

In 2010, the Smithsonian Institution expressed interest in the idea, which led to the hiring of Sarah Stierch in July as Wikipedian in residence. The following year, the National Archives and Records Administration followed suit and hired Dominic McDevitt-Parks, a student from Simmons College, who was pursuing a master's degree in history and archives management, to work at its Archives II location in College Park, Maryland. McDevitt-Parks had been editing Wikipedia since 2004 and was hired for this position by David Ferriero.

In July 2011 Wikimedia UK engaged Andy Mabbett, an editor since 2003, as an "outreach ambassador" in residence at the Bristol-based wildlife charity Wildscreen, working on the ARKive project. Since then Mabbett has been a Wikipedian in residence at other organisations such as the New Art Gallery Walsall and the Royal Society of Chemistry.

In January 2013, the Gerald R. Ford Presidential Library became the first presidential library to hire a Wikipedian in residence, when they hired Michael Barera, a master's student at the University of Michigan. In September 2013, the National Archives and Records Administration became the first organisation to employ a permanent full-time Wikipedian in residence when it hired Dominic McDevitt-Parks to join its Office of Innovation in that capacity.

In March 2014, Harvard University posted a job listing seeking applicants to be their Wikipedian in residence at the Houghton Library. In October 2014, the University of Victoria Libraries announced that in collaboration with the Electronic Textual Cultures Lab (ETCL) and the Federation for the Humanities and Social Sciences that Christian Vandendorpe had been named honorary resident Wikipedian in residence for the 2014/2015 academic year. Constance Crompton took on the role from 2014 to 2016, followed by Erin Glass from 2019 to 2020 and Silvia Gutiérrez De la Torre from 2020 to 2021.

By 2016, more than 100 Wikipedians had taken part in the role, most of whom were paid by either the institution where they work or a Wikimedia-related organization, and others as volunteers. From July 2018 to June 2019 Mike Dickison was the first "Wikipedian at large", undertaking many short residencies at various institutions throughout New Zealand, such as Wellington City Archives, the University of Canterbury, and Auckland Museum.

== Reception ==
One such advertised post has been reported positively by others as being a "unique opportunity to help enrich Wikipedia and its sister projects and share with the world ... resources and knowledge." Conversely, British journalist Andrew Orlowski criticized another advertised post as a waste of government funds. In 2013, a part-time temporary position was advertised by the National Library of Scotland and was noted as being "the first large-scale partnership" between a Scottish institution and Wikimedia UK. This initiative was followed by the University of Edinburgh, where a Wikimedian in residence was appointed in December 2015.

== See also ==
- List of Wikipedia people

== Selected bibliography ==
- Winter, Caroline (2024). "Wikipedian in Residence Programs". Open Scholarship Policy Observatory. doi:10.25547/MH4A-YR18.
- Gutiérrez De la Torre, S. E. (2021). Beyond the Wikipedian-in-Residence, or how to keep the flame burning. In L. M. Bridges, R. Pun, & R. A. Arteaga (Eds.), Wikipedia and Academic Libraries: A Global Project. Michigan Publishing. https://doi.org/10.3998/mpub.11778416.ch12.en
- Leva, F., & Chemello, M. (2018). The effectiveness of a Wikimedian in permanent residence: The BEIC case study. JLIS.It, 9(3), 141–147. https://doi.org/10.4403/jlis.it-12481
- Stinson, A., & Evans, J. (2018). Bringing Wiki (p/m) edians into the Conversation at Libraries. In M. Proffitt (Ed.), Leveraging Wikipedia: Connecting Communities of Knowledge (pp. 31–54). ALA Editions.
