= Cathy Henderson =

Cathy Henderson may refer to:

- Cathy Henderson, lead guitarist of Antigone Rising
- Cathy Henderson (artist), Irish artist (1963-2014)
