= Wellington Central Library =

Library building in New Zealand

- Te Matapihi ki te Ao Nui
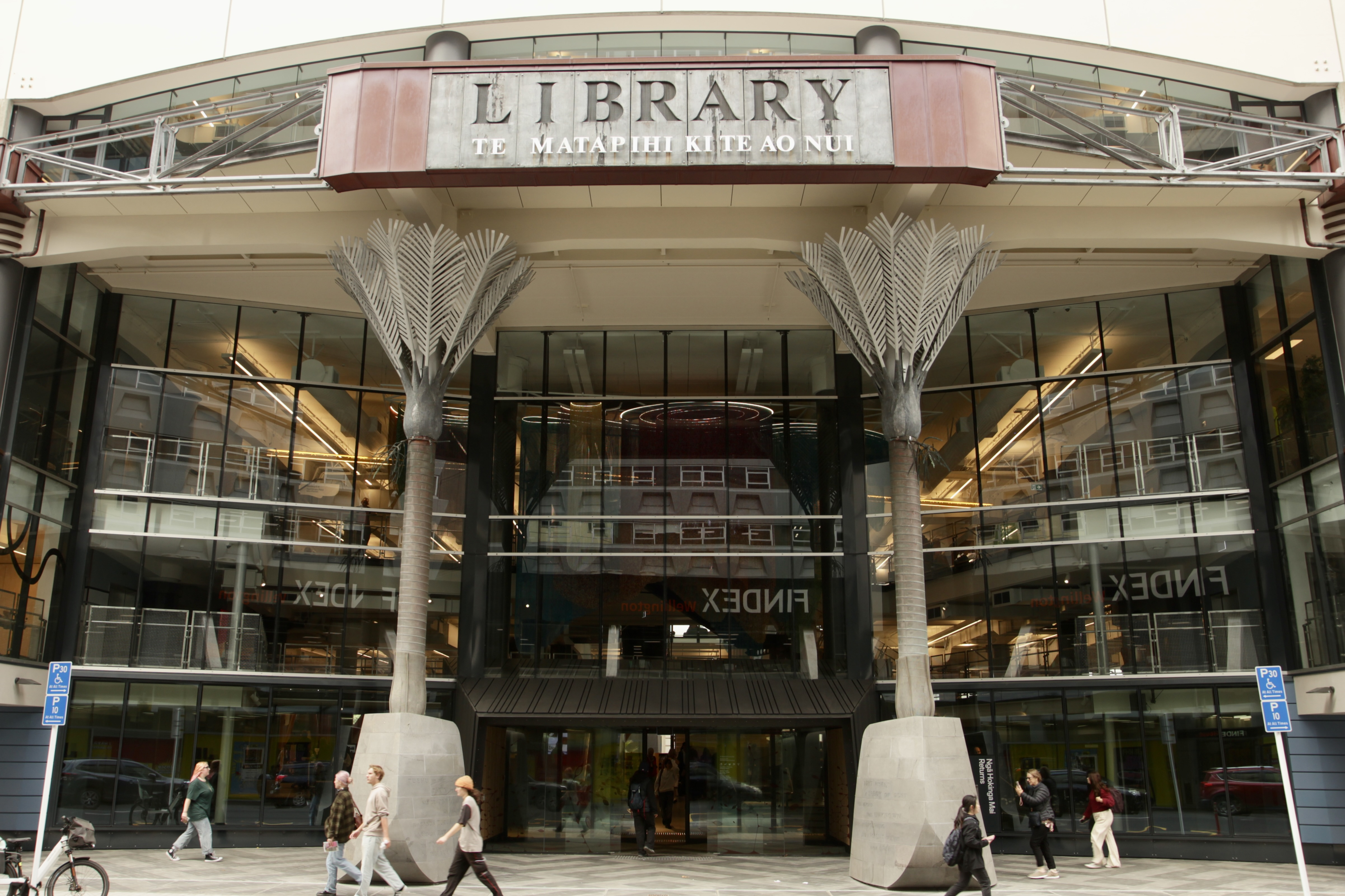
- Main entrance, 2026
- Interactive map of the Wellington Central Library area

General information
- Status: Open
- Type: Public library
- Location: 65 Victoria Street, Wellington, New Zealand
- Coordinates: 41.2882°S 174.7768°E
- Opened: 9 December 1991
- Owner: Wellington City Council

Technical details
- Floor area: 14,200 square metres (153,000 sq ft)

Design and construction
- Architect: Athfield Architects
- Main contractor: Fletcher Building and Construction

Renovating team
- Main contractor: LT McGuinness

Heritage New Zealand – Category 1
- Designated: 10 March 2021
- Reference no.: 9761

Wellington Central Library (Māori: Te Matapihi ki te Ao Nui) is a public library building in the central business district of Wellington, in New Zealand. It is owned by Wellington City Council and is listed as a Category 1 historic place by Heritage New Zealand. The building was opened in 1991 and was a key element of Wellington's municipal centre, Te Ngākau Civic Square. It serves as the main hub for the municipal library service, Wellington City Libraries.

The building was closed to the public at short notice on 19 March 2019, after Wellington City Council was advised by engineers that the building had structural vulnerabilities which meant it might not perform well in the event of a significant earthquake. Redesign and restructuring works were completed by September 2025 and the building was re-opened to the public in March 2026.

== Former library buildings ==
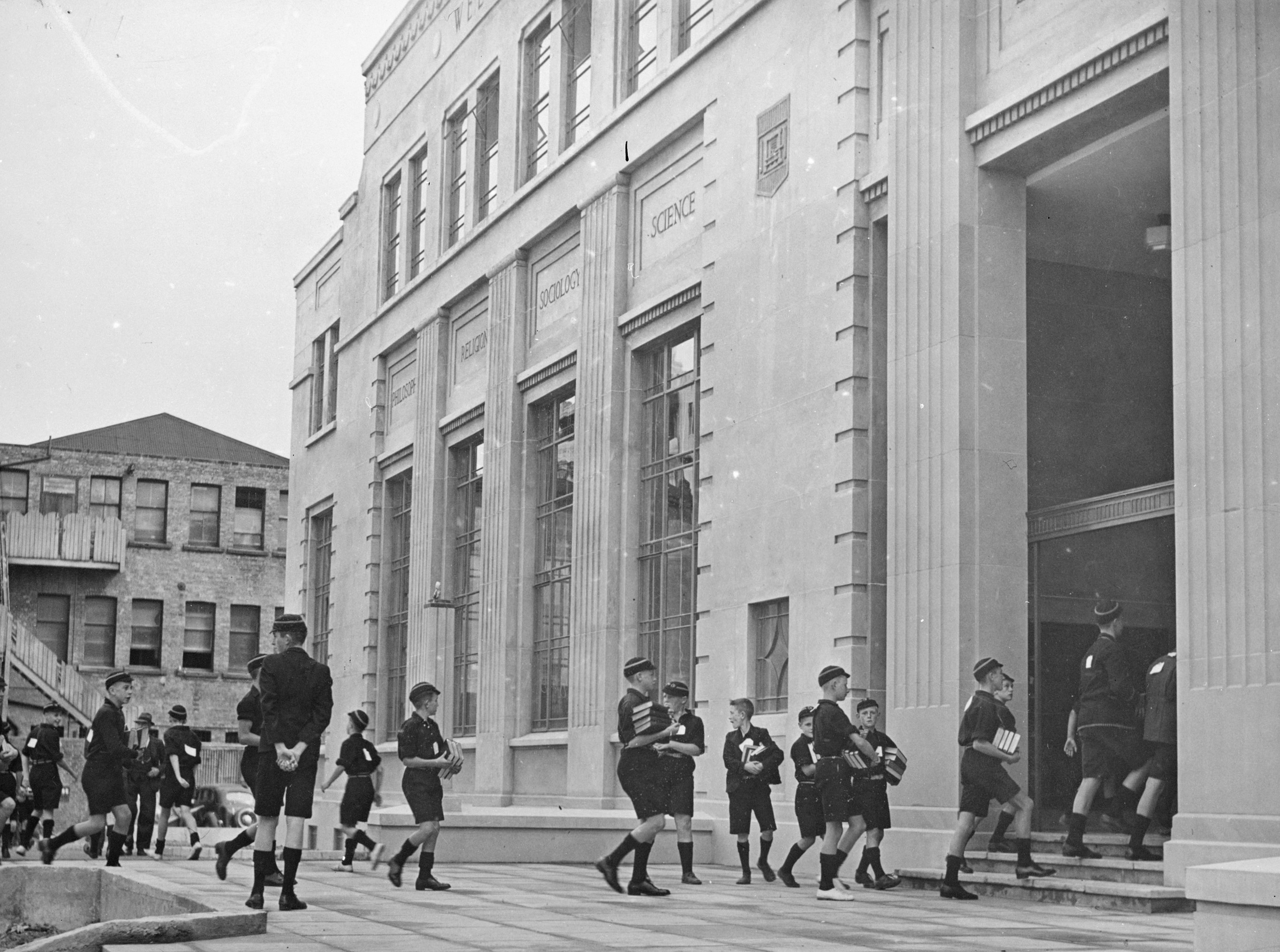
1940: Rongotai College boys carrying books from the old library into the new building.

=== 1893–1940 ===
Wellington's first Council-operated public library opened in April 1893 on the corner of Mercer and Wakefield Streets in a building designed by William Crichton, a prominent architect of the time. An earthquake in February 1893, after the building was completed but before it opened, caused cracking that was repaired. The top of the building's tower was removed after being damaged in another earthquake in 1897. By the mid-1930s the building was deemed too small, and there were concerns about safety in an earthquake such as the then-recent Napier earthquake in 1931, so planning for a new library began. The library closed in 1940 and the building was demolished in 1943.

=== 1940–1991 ===
In 1940 a new reinforced concrete art deco-style library opened on a block between Mercer and Harris street, with its entrance on Mercer Street. (Mercer Street later disappeared when it was redeveloped as part of Civic Square in the late 1980s.) The building's design was the result of an architectural competition. Two designs, by Messenger, Taylor & Wolf from New Plymouth and Gummer & Ford from Auckland, were judged equally good so the two companies worked together on the final design. The building was a T shape, and was designed so that it could be enlarged into a H and possibly have an extra storey added, though this never eventuated. Five hundred Rongotai College students carried the library's books from the old building to the new one.

By the early 1960s the library had become too small: some books were stored offsite because of lack of space, the newspaper reading room and some staff sections were housed elsewhere, and there was a lack of space for casual seating and study.

== The new Wellington Central Library ==
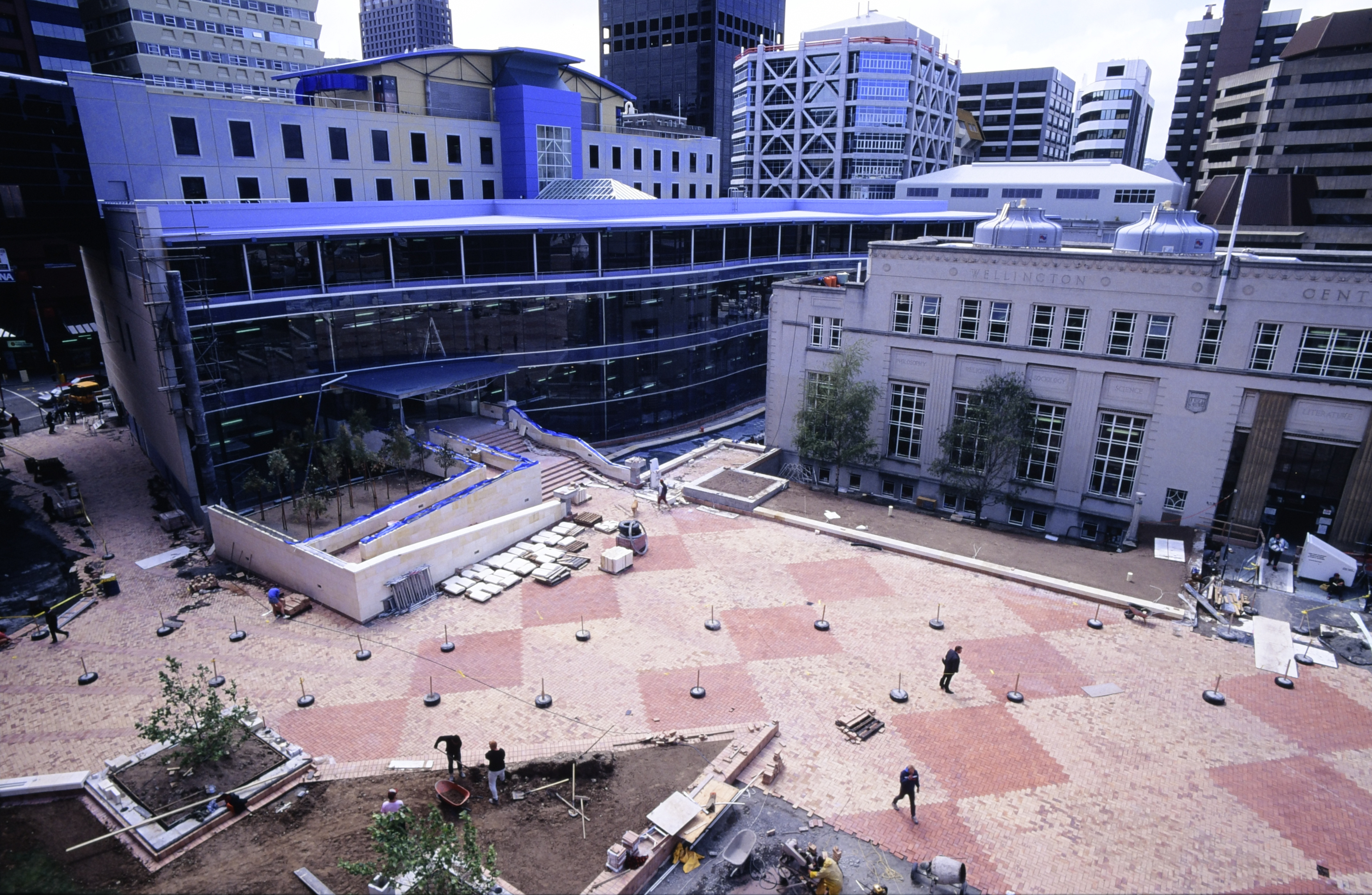
Wellington Central Library under construction c. 1991, showing the curved glass wall facing Civic Square. The former library is to the right.

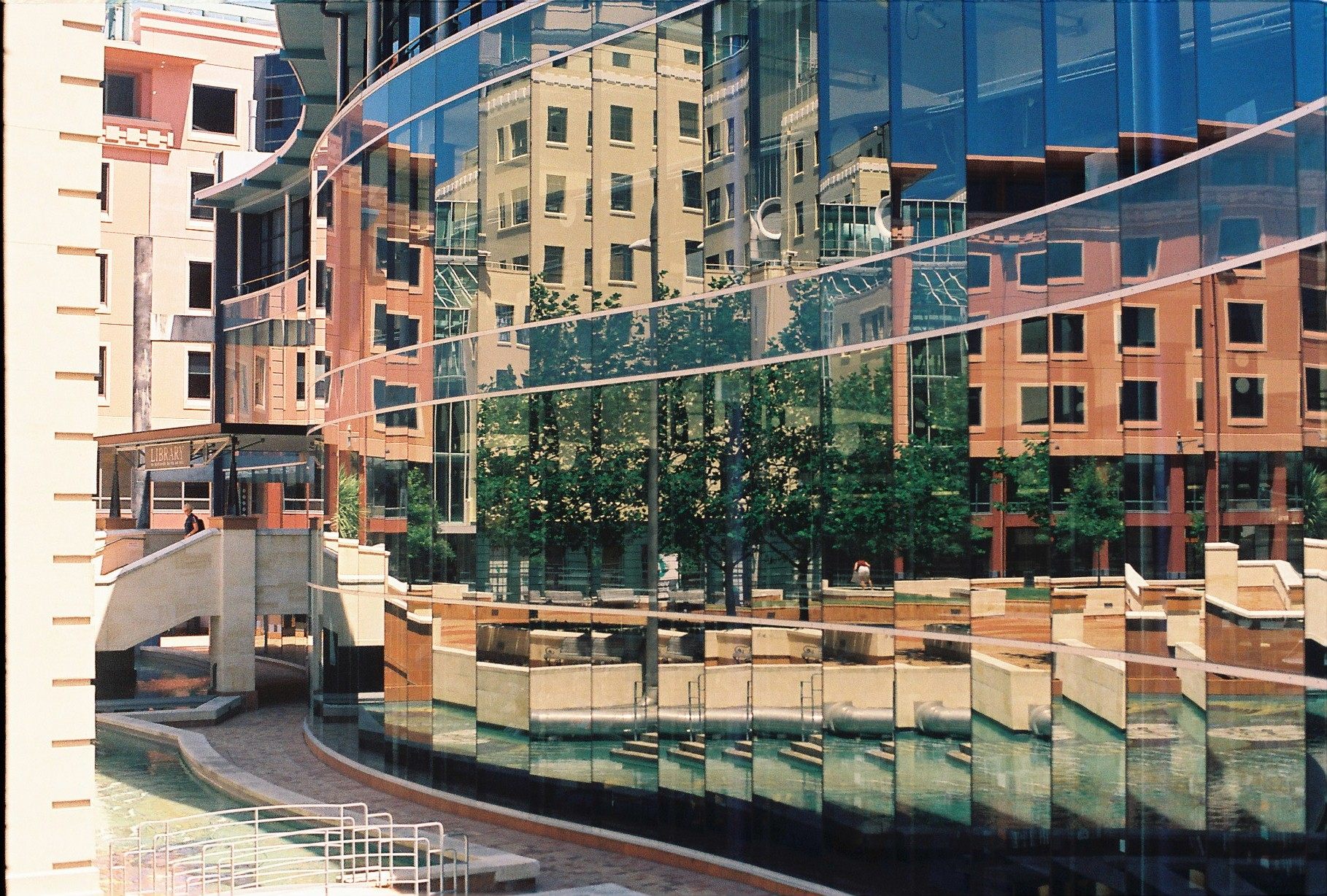
The curved wall of the library facing Civic Square, with the mezzanine entrance to the library at left.

In 1989, Athfield Architects were commissioned to design a new Wellington Central Library. The brief given to the architects was for "a distinctive and attractive building that proclaims its function. The interior to be spacious, flexible, accessible and stimulating". Ian Athfield visited libraries in the United States and became interested in the vision of a library as an "information supermarket", providing as much information as possible to as many people as possible.

The Athfield Architects design won the Environmental Award in the 1992 Carter Holt Harvey Awards and the New Zealand Institute of Architects National Award (1993). The library was built by Fletcher Building and Construction.

The new Wellington Central Library was opened by the Governor-General on 9 December 1991, and the previous library building then became the City Gallery. Both buildings are located in Civic Square, with the new library having its main entrance on Victoria Street and another entrance from Civic Square to the mezzanine level of the building. A year after the opening, the library's manager Jane Hill reported that in its first year of operation the library had seen 70% more visitors, and a corresponding increase in items borrowed. The library had become a tourist attraction, and was popular with city workers at lunchtimes. She attributed the rise in numbers partly to the attractive design of the building. Clarks Café on the mezzanine floor also reported that the café had been very successful in its first year.

The new building offered 4,000 square metres (43,000 sq ft) of extra public space and meant all services could be together in one building. There was also a public parking area in the basement with lift access to all floors, which improved access for those with mobility issues or young children. Aspects of the design were provocative and attracted controversy.

The new library cost $32 million and had 14,200 square metres (153,000 sq ft) of space. The building was five storeys high, with the library taking up three floors, each covering over 3,000 square metres (32,000 sq ft), and the top two floors being leased as office space. The curved wall of the three storeys of the library facing Civic Square was made of glass with window seats and desks looking into the square. There was also a mezzanine floor between the ground and first floors, containing a café, public toilets, meeting rooms and a small retail space. The library was said to be the first public library in Australasia to have a café inside it, though the café had separate entrances for security reasons. The library featured various artworks including Para Matchitt's sculpture Waharoa, based on the gateway to Te Kooti's pā, which highlighted the library's Māori collection. A colonnade ran along the outside of the building from Victoria Street up a ramp to Civic Square, with its columns designed as metal nikau palms. Two more palms framed the main entrance in Victoria Street. At the third floor level a two-storey cantilevered portico connected the library to the neighbouring Council administration building. This structure contained offices, meeting rooms and a staff cafeteria.

== 2013 earthquake damage ==
The two-storey structure linking the library to the council administration building was damaged in the July 2013 Seddon earthquake, and there were fears it might collapse. It was removed between November 2014 and February 2015 at a cost of $800,000.

== Seismic assessment and temporary closure ==
In 2016 the Kaikōura earthquake damaged many buildings in Wellington, and some had to be demolished. The library building was not damaged, but Wellington City Council decided to close the building at short notice on 19 March 2019 after receiving reports from engineers that the building had structural issues which meant it might not perform well in the event of a large earthquake. Engineers said that "the building [has] a complex design with a flexible frame, large voids and irregular shape – all of these elements contribute to the building's structural vulnerability in a significant earthquake". The engineers had specific concerns about the fixings on the precast concrete floors which were of similar design to those in Statistics House, a building which had partially collapsed in the Kaikōura earthquake.

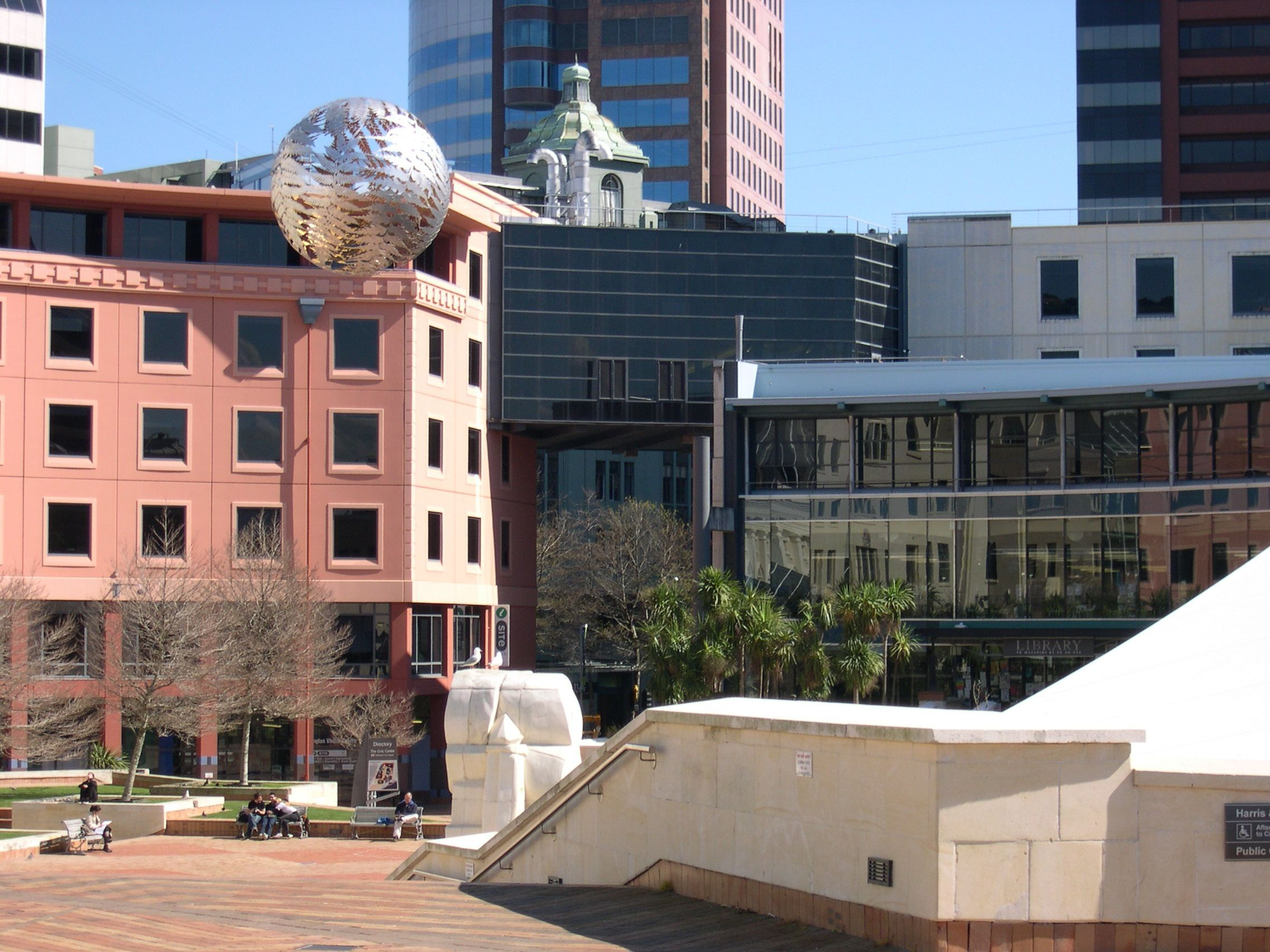
View of library (at right) from Civic Square, showing the portico (centre) that was removed in 2015. The council's administration building is to the left (now demolished).

The failure of Statistics House and other Wellington buildings damaged in the Kaikōura earthquake had led to revision of seismic assessment guidelines. The Ministry of Business, Innovation and Employment (MBIE) released The Seismic Assessment of Existing Buildings, commonly known as the Red Book, in July 2017. These guidelines provide "a technical basis for engineers to carry out seismic assessments of existing buildings". Section C5 deals with assessment of multi-storey concrete buildings. In 2018, section C5 was revised because understanding of building performance in the Kaikōura earthquake had changed. The revised section is known as the Yellow Book or Yellow Chapter. Assessment using the Yellow Book can lead to different results from assessment using the Red Book, but only the Red Book has legal standing. Wellington City Council's chief executive at the time, Kevin Lavery, requested an engineering assessment of the Central Library against the Yellow Book guidelines as soon as engineers understood how the new guidelines should be applied. It was determined that the building had an acceptable New Building Standard rating of 60 per cent according to Red Book guidelines, but only a 15 per cent rating under Yellow Book revised guidelines. Then-Mayor Justin Lester stated that "technically [the building's] earthquake rating under current code is 63 per cent but when you apply the lessons that we've learned from the Statistics Building it is almost 15 to 20 per cent which means it needs significant work".

At the time of its closure in March 2019, the Central Library was the second-most visited public building in Wellington, after Te Papa museum.

== Pop-up replacement libraries ==
Following the closure of Wellington Central Library, three pop-up replacement libraries were opened in central Wellington: Arapaki Manners Library (opened in May 2019 in Manners Street and closed in September 2024), He Matapihi Molesworth Library (opened in October 2019 inside the National Library in Molesworth Street and closed at the end of June 2023 when its lease ran out), and Te Awe Library in Brandon Street (opened in July 2020 and closed on 1 March 2026). However, none of these had the reading rooms or the opening hours of the Central Library. Wellington Central Library's collection of 400,000 items was relocated to a new collection and distribution centre named Te Pātaka, in Johnsonville, which is not open to the public, during rebuilding of the central library. Wellington City Council has stated that it prefers to have a large central library with floor loading designed to support the weight of many books and future-proofed for population growth, and that a large central library is a drawcard to bring people into the city centre, as well as providing a safe space for vulnerable people.

== Controversy: repair or replace? ==
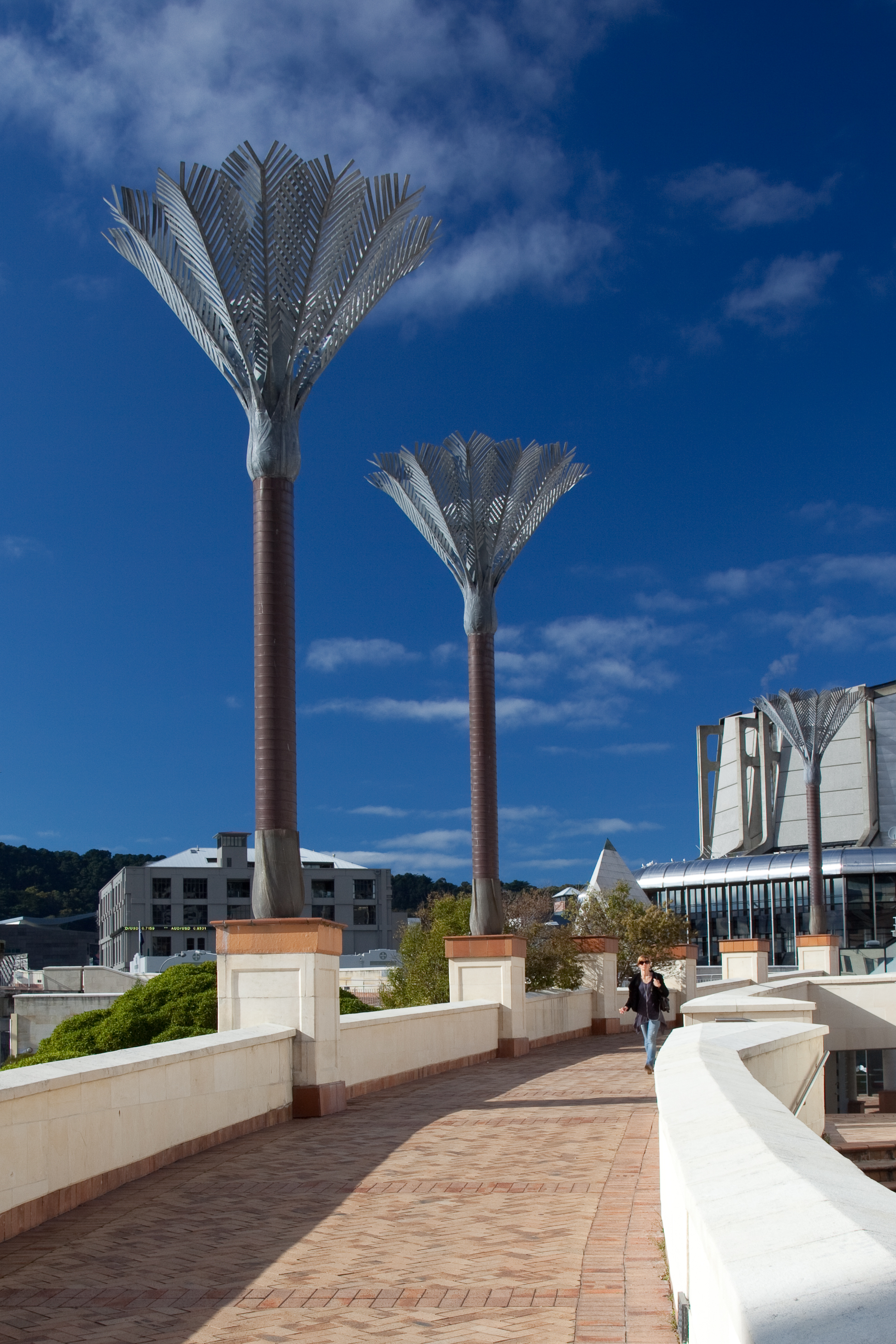
Nikau palms near the end of the colonnade, looking towards Civic Square and the Michael Fowler Centre

In July 2019 the New Zealand Institute of Architects mounted a campaign to save the library, in response to the mayor's suggestion that it be demolished. In June 2020 Wellington City Councillors voted 14–1 to repair rather than demolish the building, and announced three possible strengthening options costing between $90 million and $200 million. Criticism of any decision to repair the building came from the Taxpayers' Union, which stated that since the council was in a poor financial position and in the middle of a pandemic, any spending on the building should be delayed. They believed the three city pop-up libraries provided adequate service for residents.

Public consultation took place in September 2020, when the council put forward five options for public consideration, including construction of a new building. Also in September 2020, acknowledging fears that the building might be demolished, Heritage New Zealand proposed that it should be listed as a Category 1 historic place. This would not stop demolition, but would help inform Wellington City Council's decision-making. Public opinion was divided, with some residents saying the services provided were more important than the design of the building, the cost of refurbishment was too high or that the refurbishment would take longer than starting again with a new building.

After public consultation closed in October 2020, the council announced that it would spend $179 million to repair and upgrade the library rather than demolish it. However, in May 2021 the council announced that it was still considering other options. In September 2021 Wellington City Council announced that it was disposing of the fittings in the Central Library, either putting fixtures into storage for four years or selling or recycling furniture that could not be used elsewhere by the council. Artist impressions of the proposed redesign of the building, budgeted at $188 million, were released in April 2022.

== Heritage status ==
The Central Library's Category 1 historic place listing from Heritage New Zealand took effect from 10 March 2021. Heritage New Zealand states that Wellington Central Library has significance as an excellent example of late twentieth century library design and postmodern architecture in New Zealand. The building mixes a variety of materials and styles to create a welcoming space, with the large glass wall permitting people outside to see the library in action. Heritage New Zealand notes that the metal nikau palms forming a colonnade are a playful postmodern aspect of the building and have become one of its best-known and loved features. The palms are made from lead, copper and steel and finely detailed. There are nine palms supporting the building along the colonnade and another six at the top of the ramp leading from the colonnade across towards Civic Square. Two more palms flank the front entrance. The palms are up to 10 metres tall and cost $14,000 each.

== Redesign and re-opening ==
The council decided on design principles for the new library in April 2021. These include designing a building that includes the whole population and supports social infrastructure: it should be a creative hub that will serve existing library users and welcome new users. The building would be future-proofed to respond to changes in population and how we access information, and facilitate access to information by integrating Wellington City Council services, Wellington City Archives and Capital E (a children's play and learning experience) into the same space. The building should be a visitor attraction with a strong Wellington identity. The library would engage fully with Māori, which includes reaffirming the name the library was gifted for its 1991 opening Te Matapihi ki te Ao Nui. This name can be translated as 'The window to the wider world'. The building would feature sustainability initiatives that would earn it a 5 Green Star rating from the New Zealand Green Building Council.

Athfield Architects have redesigned their 1991 building in partnership with Rangi Kipa of Tihei Design. The new design for the building has three additional entrances, including one on Harris Street. Concrete walls have been replaced with glass, creating a brighter, more airy feeling and better connection to Civic Square. Extensions have been added to the top two floors and base isolators have been installed under the building. Contractors for the construction project were LT McGuinness. To make space for the Council Service Centre, Wellington City Archives heritage area and Capital E play and makerspace zone in the building, only 250,000 of the library's collection of 420,000 books will be publicly accessible in the library. This decision has met with opposition from authors and researchers, and is contrary to Athfield's original vision of the library as an "information supermarket". In December 2022 Wellington City Council announced that the cost of the new building had risen to $200 million, which included $6.5 million for 'cultural identity'.

Construction was completed by September 2025 at an estimated cost of $217.6 million. On 13 September 2025 a rededication ceremony was held and the redeveloped library was revealed. Designer Rangi Kipa stated that he wished to create a space where people would "feel the presence of mana whenua", and wanted to add elements of nature. Internal design features by Darcy Nicholas, Ngahina Hohaia and Wiremu Barriball reference fungi and mycelium as “connectors of the natural world”.

On the outside of the building is the 1947 poem "Brown Optimism" by Jacquie Sturm. Sturm was one of New Zealand's first Māori librarians and from 1972 was the principal New Zealand Room librarian for Wellington. The political poem was written when Sturm was a university student, and includes the lines:

For brown must learn from white, the rules to make him equal partner in the game they play; And white must cease to trample underfoot these dark leaves of the Polynesian tree.

In 1940, Rongotai College students had carried books from the original library to the new one. This event was recreated in November 2025, when 50 Rongotai students helped move hundreds of books into the redeveloped central library.

With completion of construction, the library was re-opened to the public on 14 March 2026.

=== Website controversy ===
In June 2026 an Official Information Act request brought to light the information that Wellington City Council had paid almost $600,000 for a website to promote the new library, plus $72,000 per year for hosting and maintaining it. The brief for the website was that was an "invitation" and an "introduction to the building". The contract went to Journey Digital, an Auckland company, who worked with Māpuna Consultants on the design. The website won a silver award in the 'User Interface (UI) - Ethical & Inclusive UI Design' category at the 2026 New York Product Design Awards. Wellington's deputy mayor Ben McNulty labelled the cost of the website "an atrocious amount of money", and Mayor Andrew Little stated that an independent investigation would be launched to enquire into decision-making and costs related to the website.
