= Cathy Henderson (artist) =

Irish artist

- Born: 4 February 1963; London, United Kingdom
- Died: 27 September 2014 (aged 51); Dublin, Ireland

Cathy Henderson (4 February 1963 – 27 September 2014) was an Irish artist known for her portraiture and printing.

== Early life and family ==
Cathy Henderson was born on 4 February 1963 in London. Her parents were Peter, a lecturer in occupational psychology and Mary Henderson (née Topham), an artist. She had 3 brothers. The family lived in Barton-Under-Needwood, Staffordshire until they moved to Belfast in 1971. They initially lived on the Malone Road before moving to Drumbeg, County Down. Henderson was schooled at the Charley Memorial in Drumbeg and the Methodist College Belfast. In the late 1970s, the Henderson family moved to Bangor. As a teen, Henderson developed personal artistic style with her painting, drawing and printing. Her early influences included Andrew Wyeth, Lucien Freud, and David Hockney. After secondary school, she lived in Paris for a year working as an au pair, and was then offered a place at École des Beaux-Arts. Instead, she returned to Ireland and studied graphic design at the National College of Art and Design (NCAD), Dublin, from 1983. During this time, she worked in the studio of Milton Glaser in New York over a summer.

She married David Gregg, a sound recordist and video editor, in Bangor on 8 September 1984. She undertook a postgraduate degree in NCAD in the late 1980s, graduating with an MA in fine art in 1993. From the early 1990s, they lived in Kilmacanogue, County Wicklow.

== Career ==
Her first major exhibition was held in the summer of 1992 at the Dublin City Arts Centre, in collaboration with South African poet Caesarina Makhoere with a show titled Manphwe (Voices). She held her first major solo project in 1994 with a residency at the Lyric Theatre, Belfast, with sketches and paintings exhibited in the theatre in June 1994. In 1997, she held an exhibition of Belfast Orange Order marches called Parade. Henderson also undertook commercial projects, such as illustrating popular reference books, cookery and children's books. She also published cartoons for the Sunday Business Post and the Irish Times. With her husband, she created an audio documentary for the BBC in 1998 on the Lisdoonvarna matchmaking festival, which was nominated for a Sony award. She co-founded a print-making studio, the Workroom, with fellow artists in 2001 in Hendron's building, Dominick Street, Dublin. The group also exhibited work, and Henderson gave life drawing classes.

In October 2001, Henderson suffered a serious leg injury in a road accident which ultimately resulted in her leg being amputated at the knee in 2008. She consequently had to learn to walk, and cycle again, with a prosthesis. During this time, she continued her artistic practice but did not exhibit a lot. In 2009, she created a series of portraits of porters, caterers, and cleaners during her residency at St James's Hospital which was exhibited as the show Life blood. She created a similar series of the staff of the cleansing department for the exhibition Below the surface in 2017 while artist-in-residence at Dublin City Council. In 1998 and 2013, she travelled to the Great Northern Arts Festival in Inuvik, Canada, and exhibited a series of print reliefs in Whitehorse in 2011. She joined the Black Church Print Studio in 2010, and having been influenced by Ang Chao, she undertook woodblock printing using fruit woods such as cherry, which she exhibited with the Print Studio.

In 2004, 2008, and 2012, she was awarded project grants from the Arts and Disability Forum. In 2009 and 2010, she received 'artist in the community' awards from the Arts Council to fund large projects with a group of long-term prisoners. She was commissioned to produce 3 portraits of prominent Freemasons, which were exhibited at the Grand Lodge on Molesworth Street. Her 2012 exhibition, Shore, was a series of studies of the Irish coastline, with more sky and seascapes exhibited as the show Ebb and flow at the ADF Gallery in Belfast in early 2014. Three of her seascapes were gifted to Irish President, Michael D. Higgins, in 2018. Alongside Robert Ballagh, Henderson was selected by NCAD and the Services Industrial Professional Technical Union to create a work to tell the story of the 1913 lockout in early 2012. In late 2012, she was given a terminal stage four cancer diagnosis. She continued on the project, a tapestry series, that was completed in October 2013 and opened by President Higgins at Liberty Hall, Dublin in November 2013.

== Death and legacy ==
Henderson died at Blackrock Hospice, Dublin on 27 September 2014, and was cremated at Mount Jerome cemetery on 3 October. Her final work was a commissioned portrait of oncologist Donal Hollywood for St James's Hospital. Examples of work are held in public and private collections such as National Bank of Canada, Queen's University Belfast, Bank of Ireland, BBC and the Electricity Supply Board. The Royal Ulster Academy of Arts, Belfast commissioned a portrait of Henderson by Paul Mac Cormaic in October 2018.
