= Constance Crompton =

Canadian associate professor

Constance Crompton is an associate professor in the Department of Communications at the University of Ottawa, where they are also the director of the Humanities Data Lab. Crompton holds the position of Canada Research Chair in Digital Humanities, is vice-president (English) of the Canadian Society for Digital Humanities, and is an associate director of the Digital Humanities Summer Institute (University of Victoria). In 2023, Crompton was elected to the Royal Society of Canada’s College of New Scholars, Artists, and Scientists.

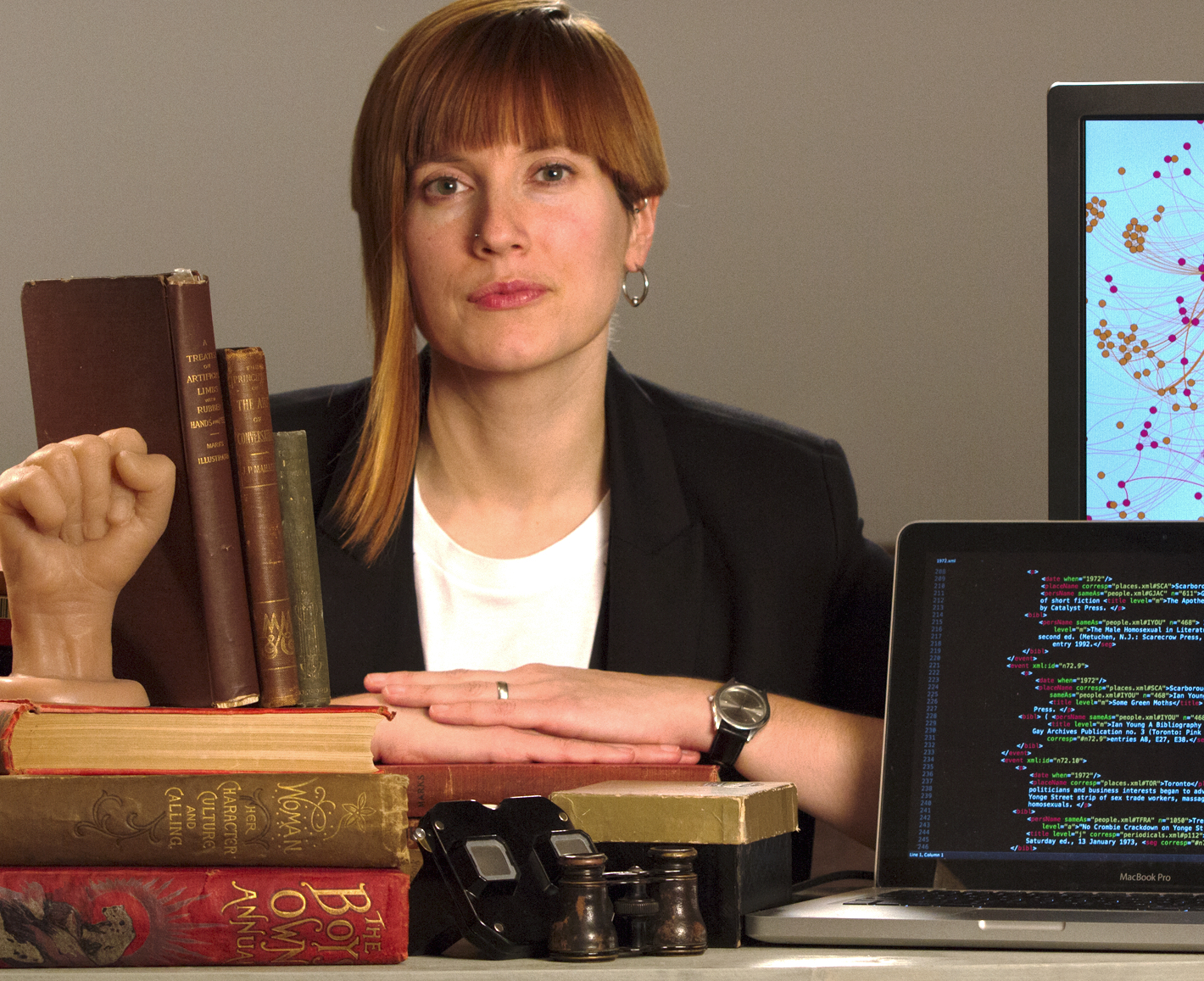
Portrait of professor Constance Crompton

== Teaching and education ==
Crompton holds a Bachelor of Arts and Masters from Toronto Metropolitan University, as well as a PhD from York University. After completing their postdoc at the University of Victoria in 2012, Crompton became an assistant professor of Digital Humanities (DH) at the University of British Columbia Okanagan (UBCO) campus where they taught DH, English, and Cultural Studies. There they founded the Humanities Data Lab in the Faculty of Creative and Critical Studies, which is now called the AMP Lab. Crompton eventually left UBC to teach at the University of Ottawa. They have worked on numerous projects, and is a key member on the Linked Infrastructure for Networked Cultural Scholarship, Implementing New Knowledge Environments Partnership, and Transgender Media Portal projects.

== Achievements ==
In 2023, Crompton was elected to the Royal Society of Canada College of New Scholars, Artists, and Scientists for “innovation and advancing knowledge in the humanities”. Crompton was named one of the University of Ottawa's early career researchers of 2019 which recognized excellence in research and teaching. In 2015, while teaching at UBCO, Crompton received an Insight Grant of almost $300,000 for the Lesbian and Gay Liberation in Canada project. Crompton has contributed to several books, including Doing Digital Humanities: Practice, Training, Research and Cultural Mapping and Digital Sphere: Place and Space. They have also published numerous journal articles and book chapters.

== Research ==
Crompton's research involves turning history into linked data format, and other interests include queer history, data modelling, and Victorian popular culture. They are the co-director of the Lesbian and Gay Liberation in Canada project alongside Michelle Schwartz (Ryerson University), an interactive database that tracks lesbian, gay, bisexual, and transgender (LGBT) history in Canada from 1964 to 1985.
