= Wellington City Archives =

Archives of the Wellington (New Zealand) City Council

- Te Kano Kohinga Kupu o Pōneke
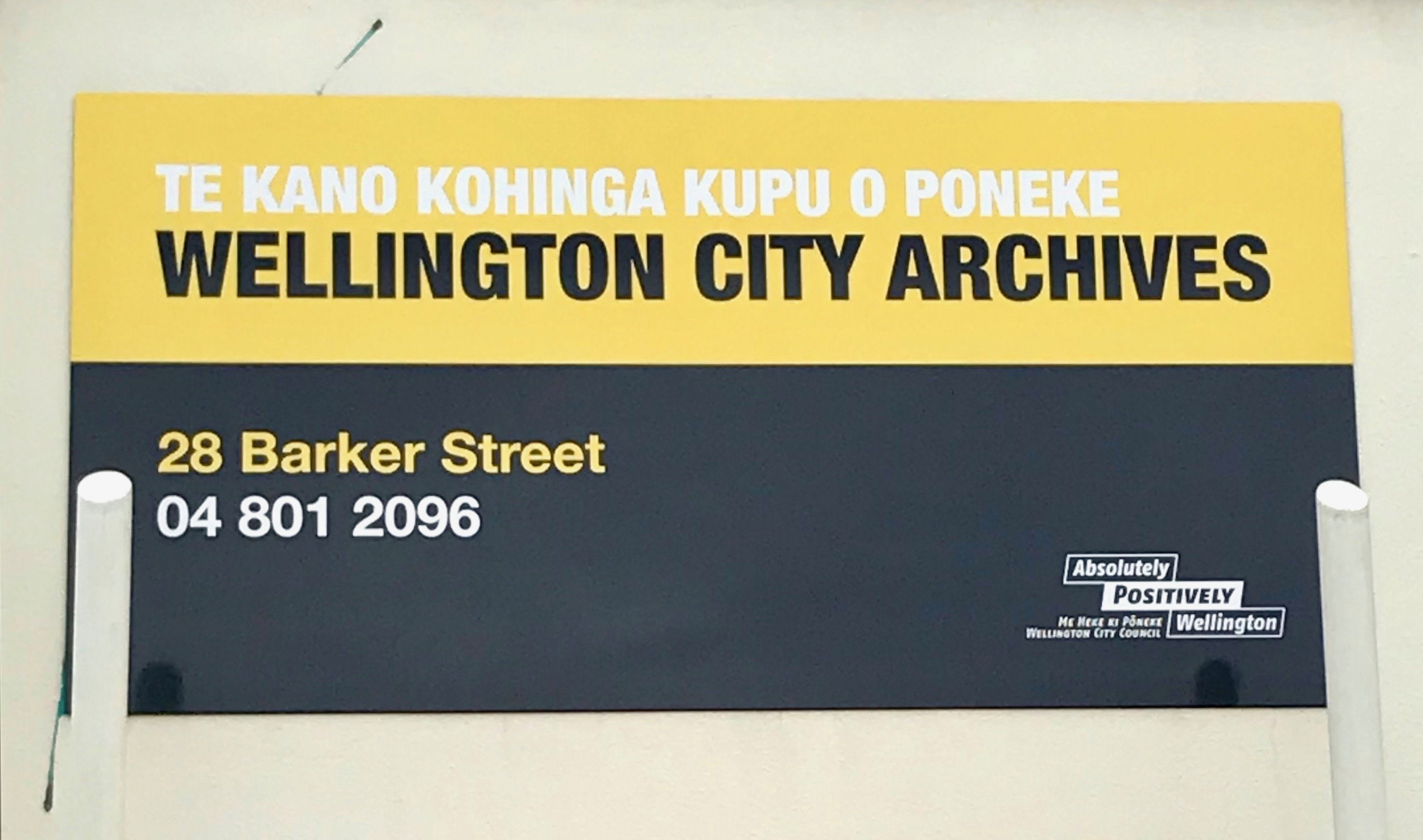
- Established: 1994
- Location: 28 Barker Street, Wellington, New Zealand
- Coordinates: 41.297993°S 174.77986°E
- Type: archive
- Website: wellington.govt.nz/your-council/archives

The Wellington City Archives preserves records of the Wellington City Council and other organisations relating to the history of Wellington, New Zealand. Established in 1994, the Council archives were housed in a single purpose-built facility in 1995, opened to the public in 1996, and made available online since 2007.

The archives are open to the public and receive up to 1000 information requests a month, from Wellington City Council staff and the general public. About half of the requests are building consent searches, and up to 300 are assisting council staff preparing Land Information Memorandums (LIM). The remainder range from historical and genealogical research requests to enquiries about land history or property information.

== History ==
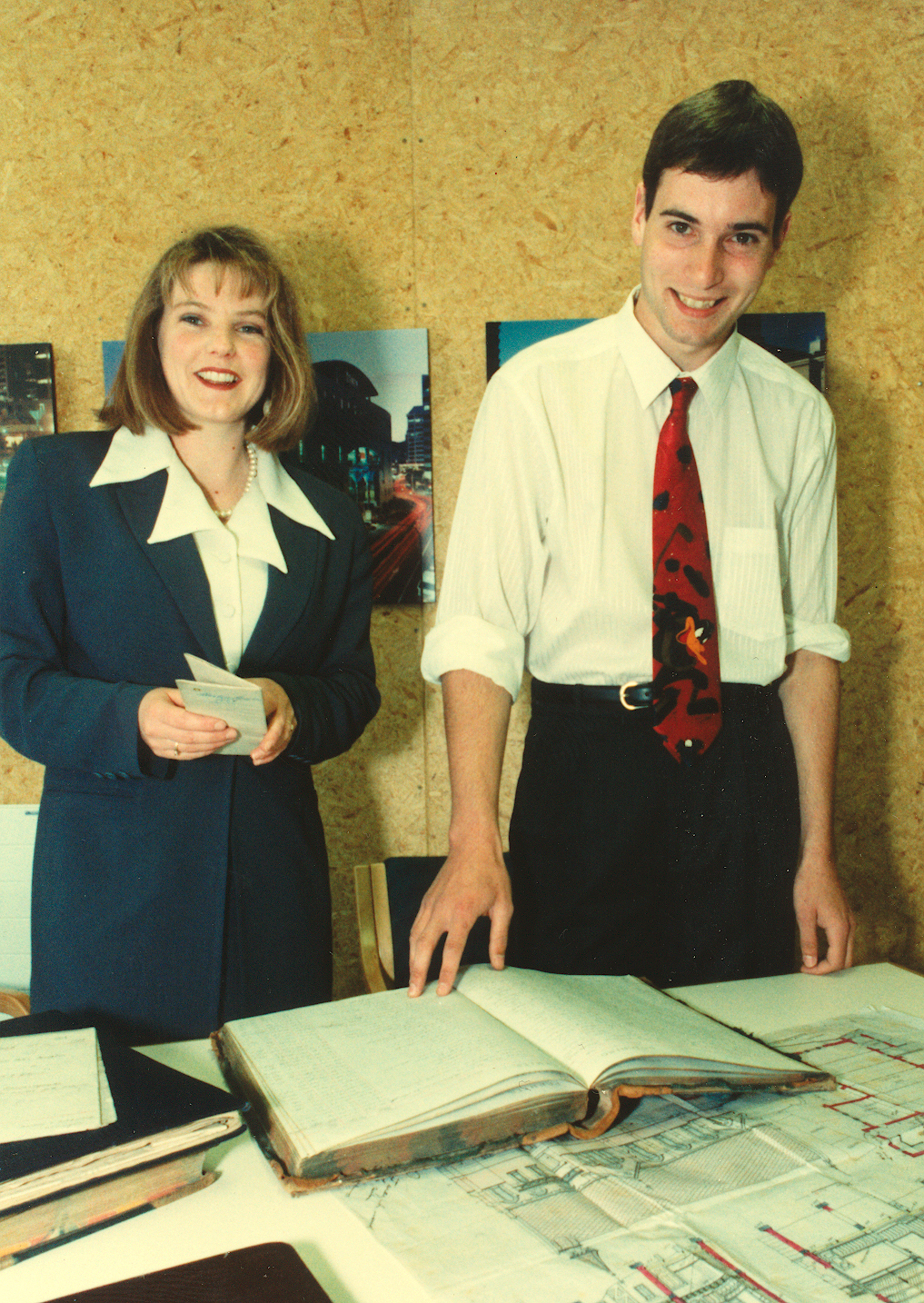
Wellington City Archivist Michelle Redward and Archives Assistant Adrian Humphris in 1995, shortly after the Archives opened – initially there were just two staff.

Wellington was the first site of local government in New Zealand, and the city's archives date back to 1842 when the Wellington Borough Council was established. As recently as 1994, council records were stored at more than 10 places around Wellington, loosely classified using a system devised in 1926. Many were housed in sub-standard conditions, at risk from temperature extremes and leaks, in breach of the Local Government Act requirements for the preservation of government archives. Some were stored below sea level in the Town Hall basement, and periodically soaked in seawater. The "rotting" documents were at risk of being lost forever, so the City Council approved relocating them to a central facility at a cost of $300,000.

The Wellington City Archives were formally established in 1994, and Michelle Redward was appointed in March as Council archivist to supervise the move. The new Wellington City Archives was opened by Mayor Mark Blumsky on 26 June 1996, in an environmentally-controlled and earthquake-proof facility on Barker Street off Tory Street, with 5 km of shelving over 730 square metres of storage area. The Archives were expanded in 2005 to 1000 square metres, creating a work room and meeting room. In 2007, more than 370,000 collection items and 9,000 scanned images were made available online, including large numbers of digitised building permit and consent records.

In 2016 the Archives partnered with information management company Techtonics to develop a new information repository, a project that won the 2017 ALGIM Information and Records Management Project of the Year award. in 2018 Wellington City Archives partnered with startup Excio to make more photographs from the collection available directly to people's mobile devices. By 2026 75 per cent of the physical collection had been digitised, with 820,000 items searchable online.

In September 2026 the Archives moved from Barker Street to two central-city locations: some of more public-interest collection into the new central library, Te Matapihi ki te Ao Nui, and most to a climate-controlled space with a reading room in the new Wellington City Council building in Harris Street. More than a shelf-kilometre of unneeded items were disposed of.

=== List of Wellington City Archives managers ===
- Michelle Redward (1994–1998)
- Joanna Newman (1998–2008)
- Adrian Humphris (2012–)

== Holdings ==
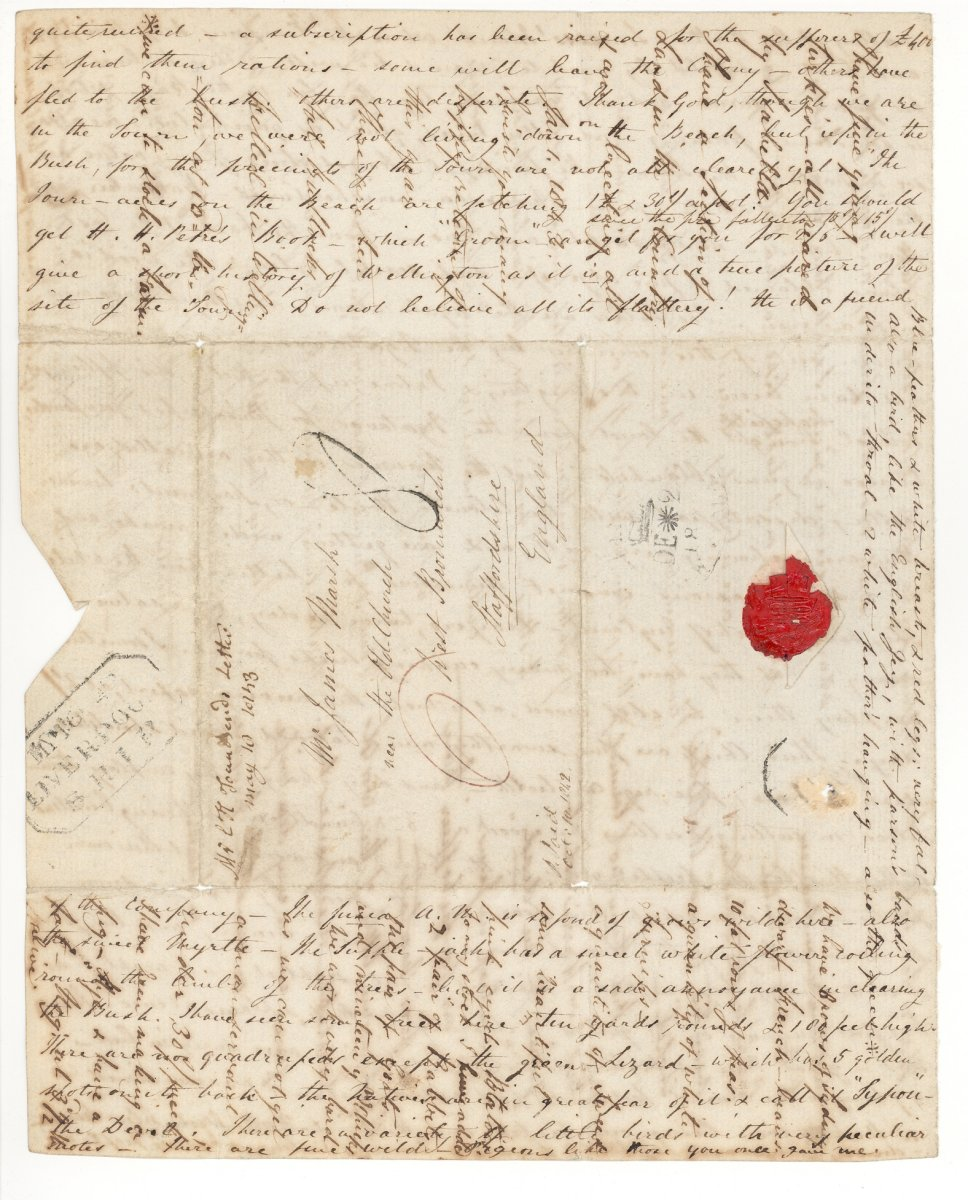
The 1842 letter from Chauncey Townsend to James Marsh, Wellington City Archives' oldest correspondence. It is written in two directions to make the best use of scarce paper.

Wellington City Archives, one of the largest territorial archives in New Zealand, contains 1.4 million documents, including over 20,000 photographs, which would stretch 10 km if laid back-to-back. The archive's collections include:

- A parchment electoral roll dating for the first council in 1842, listing all men eligible to vote
- An 1842 letter from settler Chauncey Henry Townsend, the Archives' earliest correspondence
- A number of early sketches by Charles Decimus Barraud
- Drainage and storm water plans recording the former location of streams
- Minutes of the town board and City Council starting in 1863
- Transcribed rate books containing land ownership records beginning in 1863
- Correspondence from Richard Seddon and Julius Vogel
- The Wellington Harbour Board archives, from its founding in 1880
- The hand-drawn maps of Thomas Ward, who spent three years in the 1880s walking around Wellington sketching street plans
- Building permits from 1892 and all completed contemporary resource and building consents (only live consents are held at the City Council offices)
- The records of the Union Steam Ship Company from 1900
- Panoramic photos of 1920s Wellington by photographer Robert Percy Moore
- Photos from the official Council Photographer from the 1950s onward

== Gallery ==
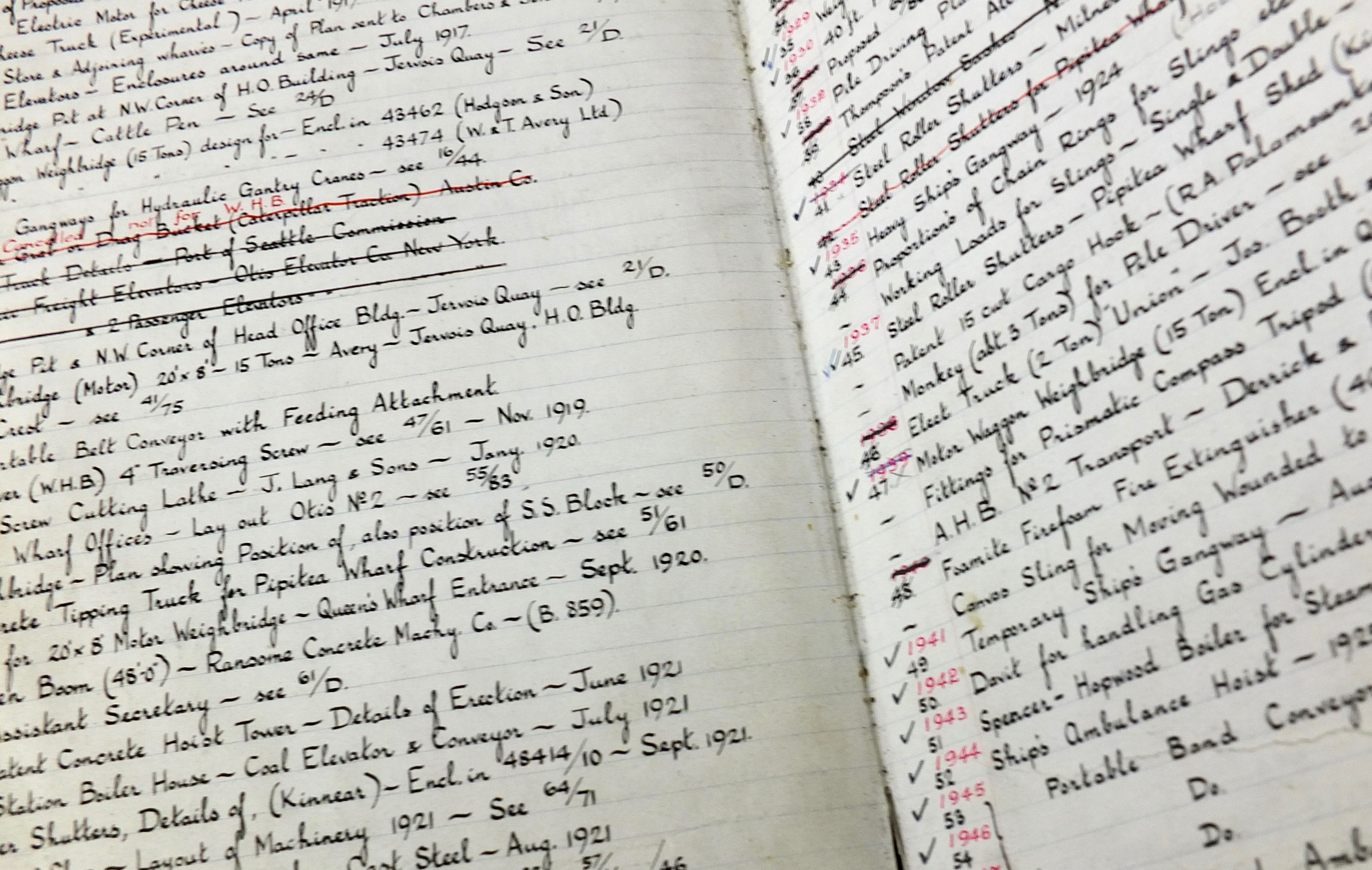
A register of drawings from the Wellington Harbour Board, 1920s

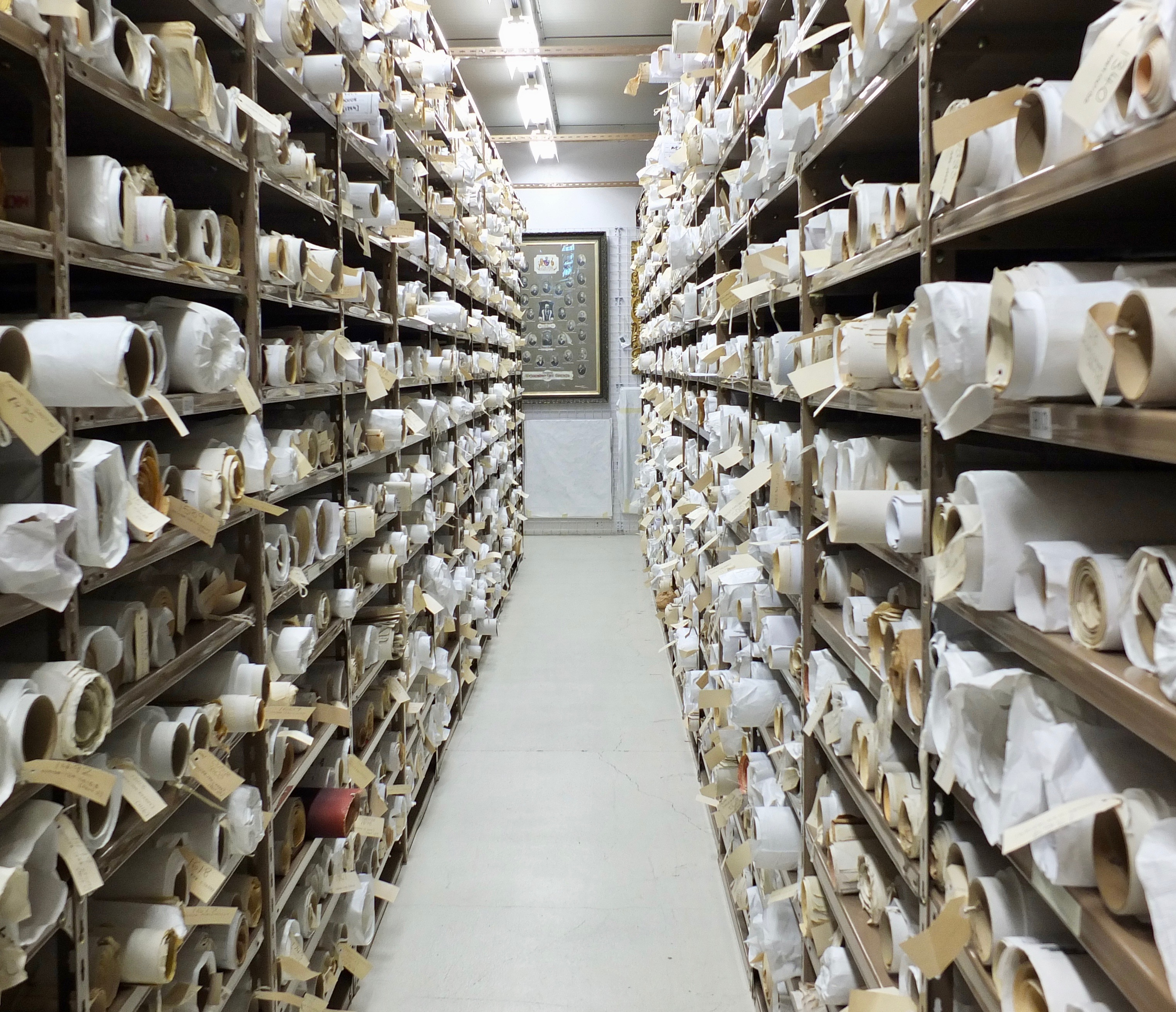
Rolls in storage, mostly building plans

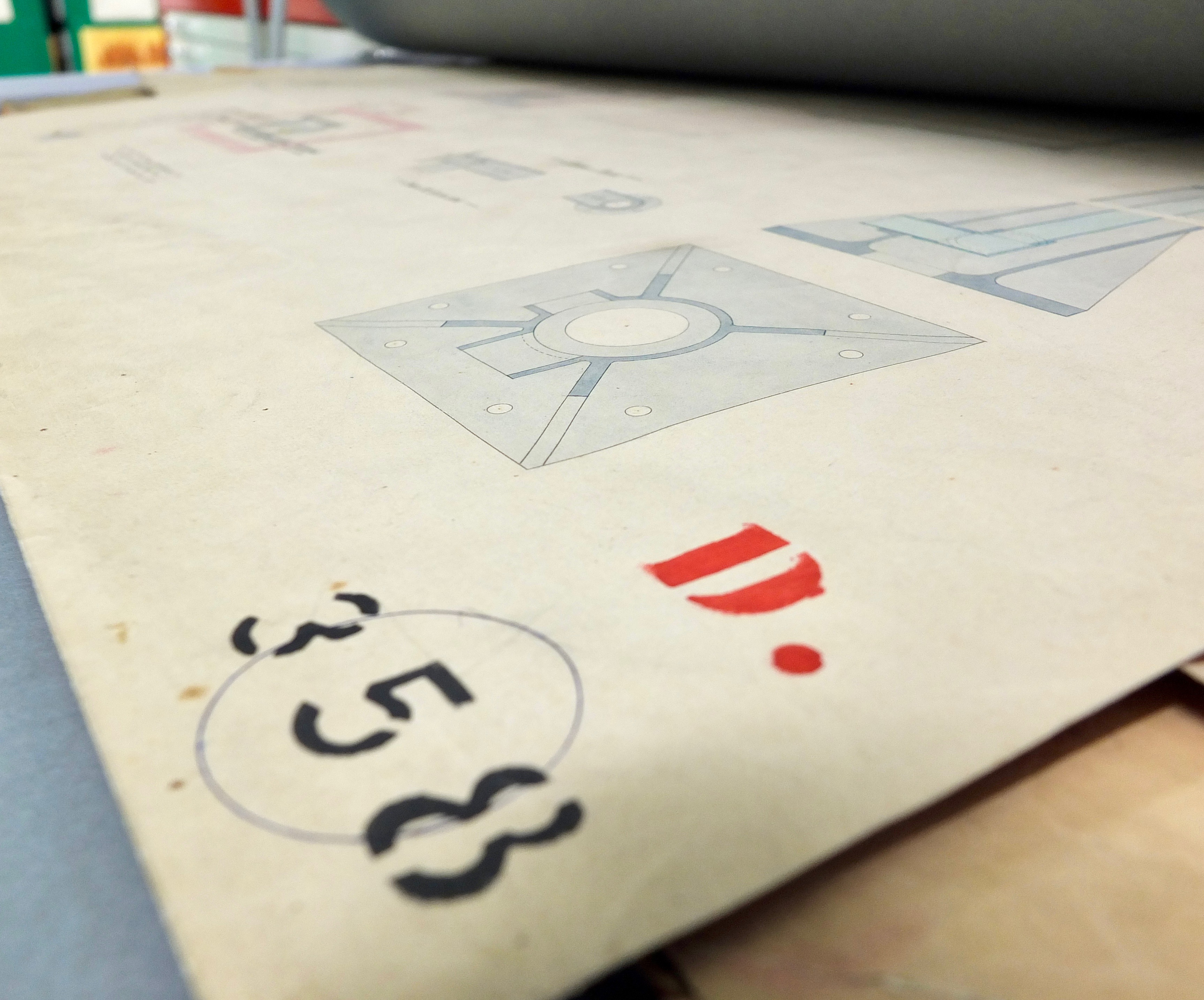
Ejector station diagram, Drainage Plan D 358

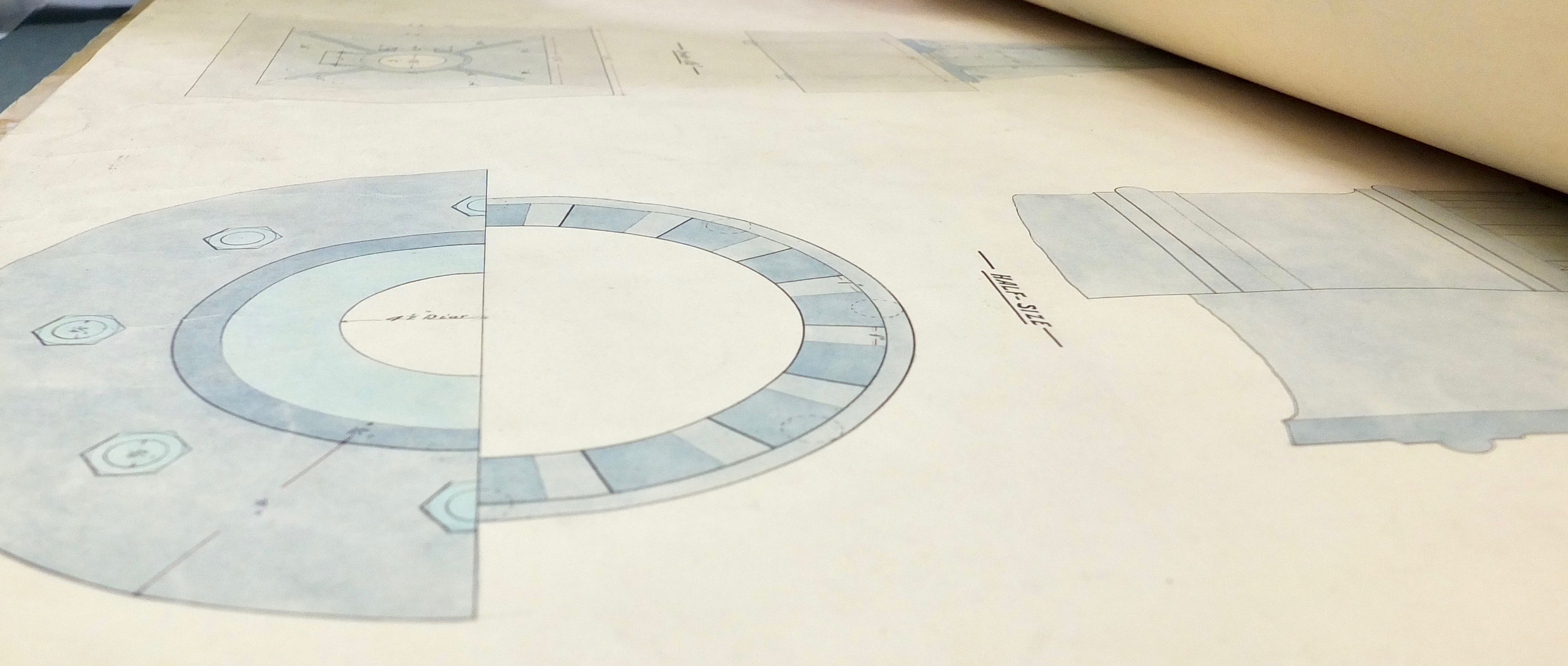
Drainage plan

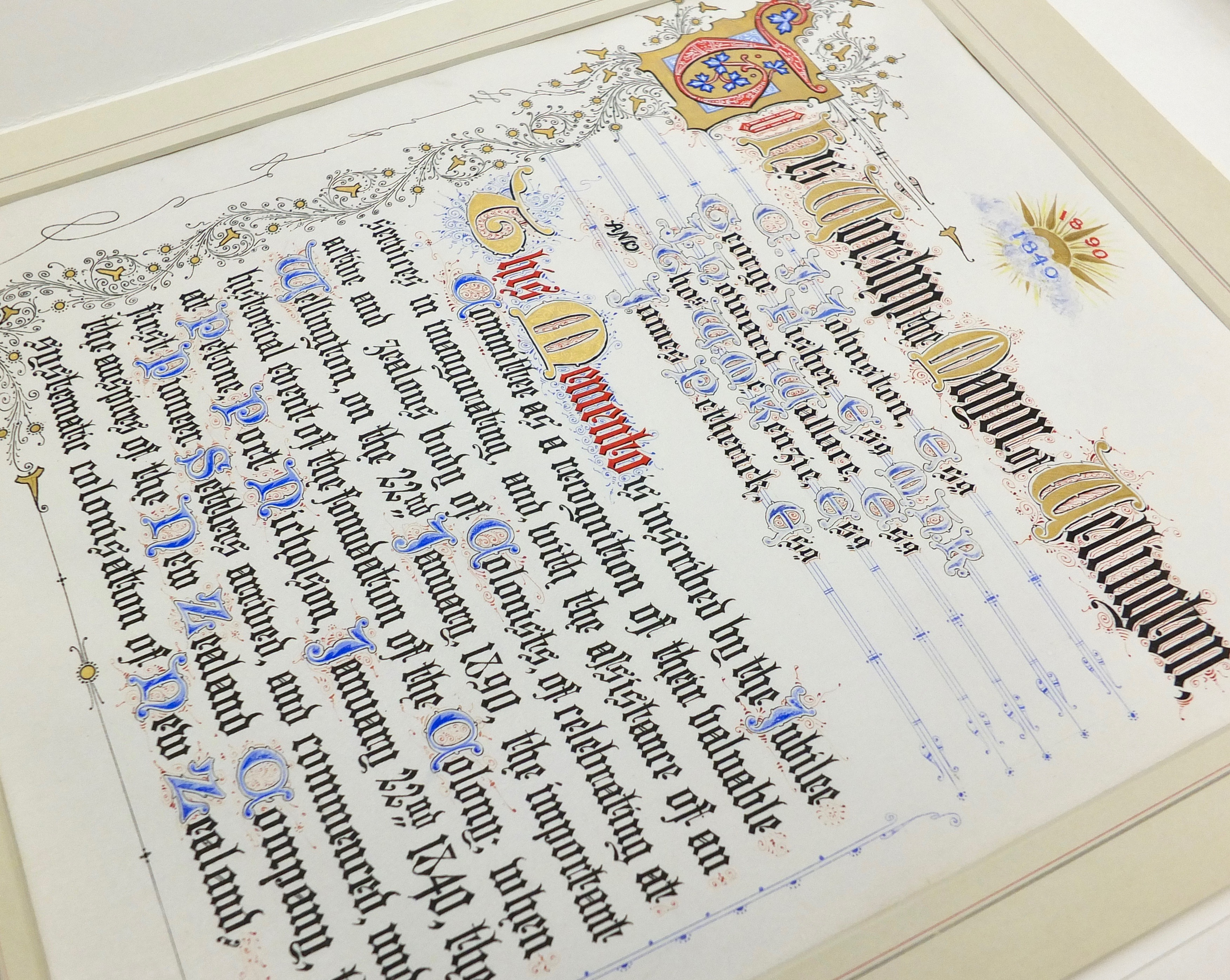
Illuminated memento of the 150th anniversary of the arrival of settlers at Port Nicholson

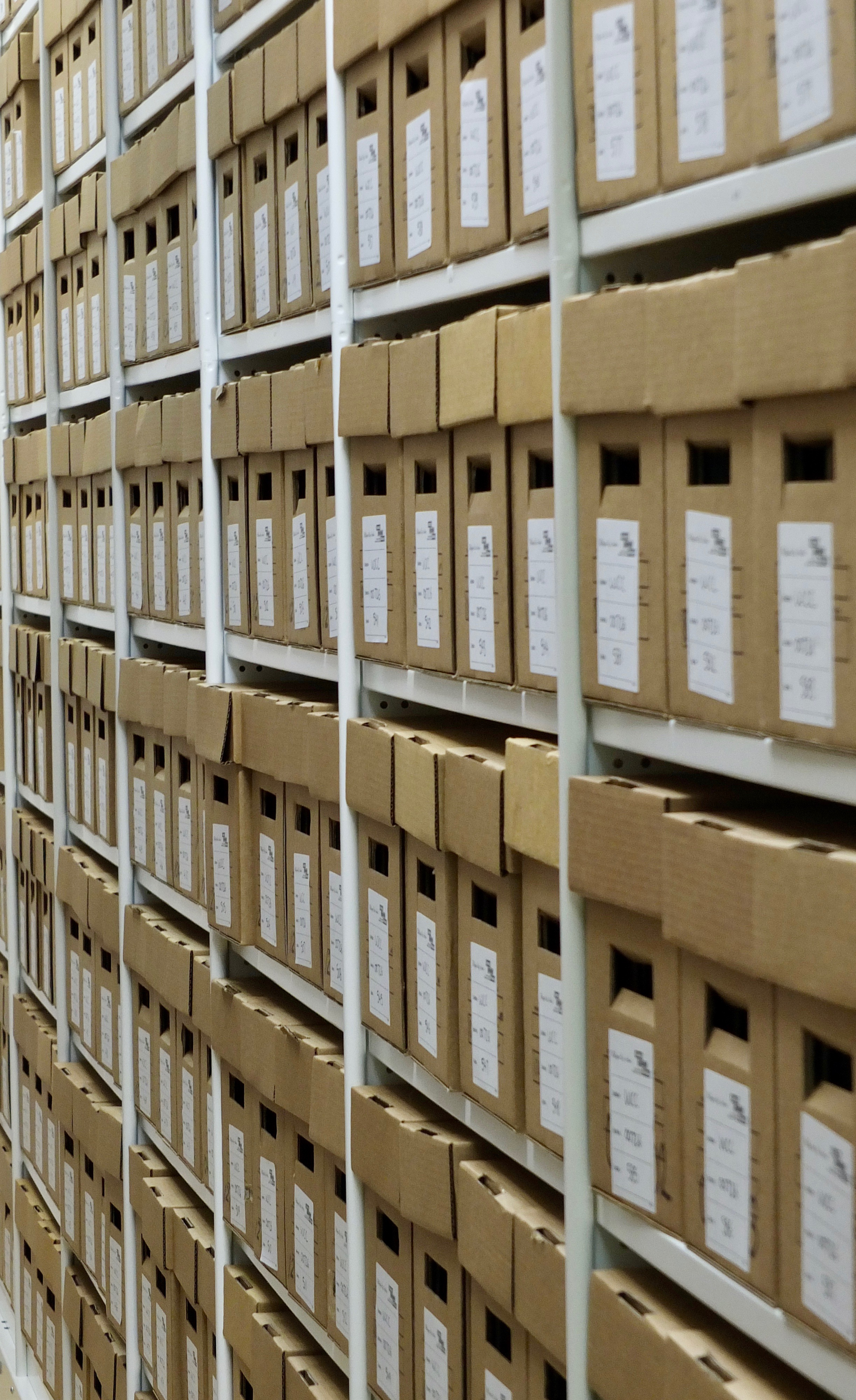
"London" archive boxes
