= Molesworth Street =

There are at least two notable streets called Molesworth Street:

- Molesworth Street, Dublin, Ireland
- Molesworth Street, Wellington, New Zealand

There are also Molesworth Streets in the following places:

- North Adelaide, Australia
- Wellesley, Ontario, Canada
- Lewisham, England
- Rochdale, England
- Wadebridge, England
- New Plymouth, New Zealand
- Cookstown, Northern Ireland
