= Mervyn Williams (artist) =

New Zealand artist

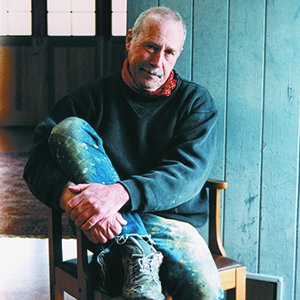
- Born: Mervyn John Williams; 22 April 1940 (age 85); Whakatāne, New Zealand
- Education: Avondale College
- Alma mater: Elam School of Fine Arts
- Known for: Painting and other media
- Movement: Optical art, modernism and colour field
- Spouse: Helen Jermyn (m. 1962; div. 1985)
- Children: 3

Mervyn John Williams (born 22 April 1940) is a New Zealand artist. He was an early exponent of Op art in New Zealand in the 1960s–70s. In 1990 he originated a style of illusionary abstract painting based on chiaroscuro, creating the impression of three-dimensional forms and textures on a flat canvas. Since 2009 he has used digital techniques in returning to an Op art style. Williams is almost unique amongst his contemporaries in New Zealand art for having embraced abstraction at the start of his career and exclusively throughout. His work is held in all major New Zealand public collections. A monograph by Edward Hanfling was published by Ron Sang in 2014 coinciding with a survey exhibition.

== Early life ==
Williams was born in Whakatāne on 22 April 1940. He moved between the Bay of Plenty Region and Auckland between 1940 and 1951 when he settled permanently in Auckland. He began secondary school at Avondale College in 1954, where his art teacher was Robert Nettleton Field. In 1956, Williams was obliged to leave school prematurely to help support his family following the death of his father, though Field continued to mentor his former student.

In 1955, Williams began work at ceramics firm Crown Lynn, where he received guidance and encouragement from Frank Carpay. He subsequently pursued a more intensive design opportunity at Ted Dutch's art and design studio, receiving training in painting, design and graphic techniques until 1961 when he established his own studio. In 1957 and 1958, Williams attended Elam School of Fine Arts part-time, where he met Don Binney and Graham Percy.

Williams married Helen Jermyn in 1962. They had three sons, and from 1965 to 1972 lived near Te Henga / Bethells Beach in West Auckland. The couple divorced in 1985. In the mid-1960s, photographer Marti Friedlander made a series of portraits of Williams.

== Career ==
=== Early work ===
Williams made oil paintings as well as works in gouache on paper during the years 1956 to 1961. They feature adjacent and layered patches of mainly muted colour along with linear elements. There are similarities to the paintings of Ted Dutch and to mid-twentieth-century School of Paris abstract painters, such as Vieira da Silva and Georges Mathieu. Beginning in the early 1960s, Williams began to make work with strong geometric shapes influenced by Josef Albers and Mark Rothko.

=== Op art ===
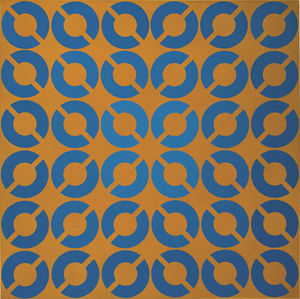
Mervyn Williams Daedal Series 6 (Epicentre) 1979 Acrylic on Canvas 1220 x 1220mm

In the early to mid 1960s, Williams began working in the Op art style that developed over the same period in Europe and the United States. His compositions of closely spaced lines, geometric shapes and high-keyed, contrasting colours were carefully rendered to create optical illusions and vibrations. He aimed to create the impression of movement and three-dimensionality on a static, two-dimensional painted surface, and to bring the experience of visual art closer to that of music, unfolding over time. The Chromatic Invention series (1969–70) reflects the artist's admiration of Johann Sebastian Bach, and his belief that invention is the most important quality in art.

Williams' work of the 1960s and 1970s relates to that of European artists such as Bridget Riley and Victor Vasarely. Op art came to prominence in the United States with the Museum of Modern Art’s exhibition The Responsive Eye in 1965, and had a large public following. In New Zealand, a small number of artists worked in an Op style, notably Gordon Walters and . Ray Thorburn Williams and Walters travelled to Melbourne, Australia, together in 1975, breaking their return journey to visit Sydney to see an exhibition of recent paintings by Bridget Riley at the Coventry Gallery.

Williams’ Op art was partly a reaction against the emphasis on expressive mark-making and individual style in 1950s Abstract Expressionism. He believed in the universal appeal of optical illusion, declaring that it “appeals to a more innocent side of ourselves”. He experimented with photo-mechanical techniques to produce optical patterns as efficiently as possible and in multiples, thereby making it available to more people. The exactitude and impersonal finish of Williams’ paintings directs the viewer’s attention to the images themselves and their own perception, rather than the artist’s touch or sensibility.

Important series from Williams’ Op art phase of the 1970s include the Daedal series, the Quotient (1973) and Delta (1978–80) series. These series were shown during the 1970s at Barry Lett Galleries in Auckland and the Elva Bett Gallery in Wellington. A selection from all three series was shown in a two-person exhibition with Gordon Walters at the Canterbury Society of Arts Gallery in 1984.

=== Crusties ===
In 1980 Williams visited New York and London, and saw the exhibition A New Spirit in Painting at the Royal Academy, London, and other important exhibitions in New York, Washington, D.C. and Los Angeles. Upon his return he began to make paintings with thickly encrusted paint and simpler compositions. However, the interest in perception continued, as the raised paint surfaces and layering of colours generated a play of light and shadow.

Williams was part of the Seven Painters/The Eighties exhibition that toured New Zealand during 1982–83, starting at the Sarjeant Gallery in Whanganui. The exhibition also featured Gretchen Albrecht, Stephen Bambury, Max Gimblett, Richard Killeen, James Ross, and Ian Scott. In 1983, Williams was included in the exhibition The Grid: Lattice and Network at the Auckland City Art Gallery.

In the second half of the 1980s, Williams continued his quest to “articulate light”, using gels and pastes to produce a concrete or tactile support that he then sprayed with thin films of paint. Paintings such as Chart (1989) and Desert Sand (1986) generate changing effects of light and colour that depend on the conditions under which they are seen and the position of the viewer.

Williams’ paintings of this period have similarities with the 1970s “thick field” abstract paintings of American artists Jules Olitski and Larry Poons. However, art historian Michael Dunn contrasts Williams’ interest in light and illusion with the emphasis on flatness and objecthood in American abstraction.

=== Wooden constructions ===
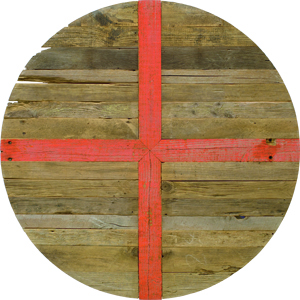
Mervyn Williams Odyssey 1989 Wooden Construction 1600 mm dia

In 1989, Williams was awarded the Tylee Cottage Residency in Whanganui, a position administered by the Sarjeant Gallery Te Whare o Rehua, and he continued to live in Whanganui until 1991. He collected wooden detritus washed down the Whanganui River from beaches around the river mouth, and with the aid of a local joiner created subtle geometric compositions. Williams was attracted to the natural textures, tones and patterns of the weathered wood, and he has said that their “surfaces had an eloquence about them that had evolved spontaneously, rather than been laboured over with modelling paste.” Notable examples are Odyssey (1989, Auckland Art Gallery Toi o Tāmaki) and Organon 1 (1989, Sarjeant Gallery Te Whare o Rehua).

The wooden constructions were exhibited at Gow Langsford Gallery, Auckland, in July–August 1989, and later that year under the title Points of Departure at the Sarjeant Gallery, where Williams also made a large sculptural installation in the central domed space.

=== Illusionary paintings ===
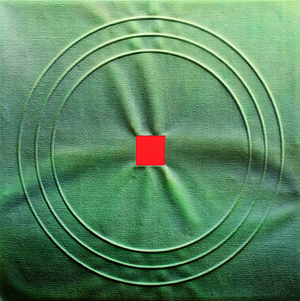
Mervyn Williams Pale Jade 2012 Acrylic on Canvas 912 x 912mm

During 1990–91, while living in Whanganui, Williams worked on techniques for creating the illusion of physical texture on a flat, painted surface. Eventually, using a thin film of paint and creating fine shifts in tone and colour, he achieved an almost photographic rendering of effects of light and shadow. The series evolved as a number of distinct formats or groups, each based on a simple, geometric structure. The paintings are primarily studies in perception and light. Williams has been likened to a “magician” because his paintings generate responses of surprise and wonder, and a degree of mystery surrounds his technique. The illusionary paintings are considered an original achievement, without obvious precedent in the history of art internationally. They were first exhibited at Gow Langsford Gallery in March 1992, following Williams’ return to Auckland the previous year.

The illusionary paintings are representational in the manner of the Old Masters, and can thus be described accurately as trompe-l'œil works, but they represent abstract forms and ambiguous phenomena. Williams has described them as “at once both totally abstract and as representational as you can get.” According to curator Anna-Marie White, Williams is significant because “he created a new direction within abstract painting while simultaneously challenging the very nature of abstraction as a non-representational art form.” Important examples of the illusionary paintings are Where Corals Lie (1994, Rutherford Collection) and Precept (Gold) (2005, private collection).

The illusionary paintings draw attention to perception itself, and encourage critical reflection on the relationship between what we see and what we believe we see.

=== Digital mixed media paintings ===
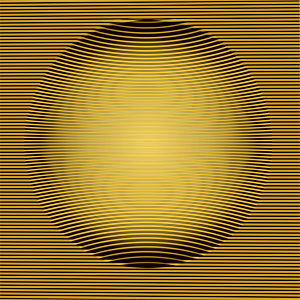
Solar Flare 2011 Mixed Media on Canvas 1220 x 1220mm

Williams began to experiment with digital techniques in 2009, leading him to revisit his Op style of the 1960s and 1970s. He developed a new body of work combining digital processes with traditional painting techniques. Works such as Solar Flare (2011), Centrifuge (2013) and Paragon (2013) create optical vibrations that would have been difficult to achieve before the advent of digital technology. Parallels have been drawn between Williams' attitude to digital technology and the spirit of excitement, hope and innovation that informed his original Op works in the 1960s.

=== Sculpture ===
Williams has produced sculpture throughout his career, though it was only during his time in Whanganui that it came to the fore. In 2007 he began to devote more time to sculpture, and produced a series of works using tubular modules in bronze, stainless steel, aluminium and concrete, realising them on an increasingly large scale.

== Major exhibitions ==
- 2015 Façade, ARTIS Gallery, Auckland
- 2014 Lost for Words: Mervyn Williams: From Modernism to the Digital Age, Gus Fisher Gallery, Auckland
- 2008 Sleight of Hand, Suter Art Gallery, Nelson
- 2000 Opposites Attract, with Paul Dibble, Michael Carr Art Dealer, Sydney
- 1997 Ross Bleckner, Mark Francis, Mervyn Williams, Gow Langsford Gallery, Auckland
- 1996 Visa Gold Award, Auckland Art Gallery Toi o Tāmaki
- 1994 Parallel Lines: Gordon Walters in Context, Auckland Art Gallery Toi o Tāmaki
- 1992 Surface Tension, Auckland Art Gallery Toi o Tāmaki
- 1990 Out of the Woods, Sarjeant Gallery Te Whare o Rehua Whanganui
- 1989 Points of Departure, Sarjeant Gallery Te Whare o Rehua Whanganui
- 1984 Gordon Walters and Mervyn Williams, Canterbury Society of Arts Gallery, Christchurch
- 1983 Aspects of Recent New Zealand Art: The Grid: Lattice and Network, Auckland Art Gallery Toi o Tāmaki
- 1982 Seven Painters/The Eighties, Sarjeant Gallery Te Whare o Rehua Whanganui, touring exhibition
- 1980 Benson and Hedges Art Award Exhibition
- 1978 Auckland Painters Exhibition, Auckland Art Gallery Toi o Tāmaki
- 1972 Biennale of Graphic Art, Paris
- 1970 NZ Pavilion, Expo 70, Japan
- 1967 Two-person exhibition with Pat Hanly, Wellington
- 1966 International Biennale of Graphic Art, Tokyo

== Collections ==
- Auckland Art Gallery Toi o Tāmaki
- Chartwell Collection, Auckland Art Gallery Toi o Tāmaki
- Christchurch Art Gallery Te Puna o Waiwhetu
- Dunedin Public Art Gallery
- Museum of New Zealand Te Papa Tongarewa
- Sarjeant Gallery Te Whare o Rehua, Whanganui
- Suter Art Gallery, Nelson
- Te Manawa Art Gallery, Palmerston North
- University of Auckland
