= Sue Crockford Gallery =

Former art gallery in New Zealand

The Sue Crockford Gallery was a contemporary art dealer gallery in Auckland, New Zealand.

== History ==
Sue Crockford's career in the visual arts began with her role as an Arts Advisory Officer in the Department of Education. When she and her husband, art historian Francis Pound, travelled to New York in 1982 they visited a number of dealer art galleries. On their return, Crockford resolved to open a dealer gallery in Auckland and early in 1985 she opened the Sue Crockford Gallery on Albert Street. The following the gallery moved to Achilles House in Commerce Street and in 1995 to the second floor of the Endeans Building, where it remained until the gallery closed in 2012. Sue Crockford died in 2023.

== Artists ==
The Sue Crockford Gallery opened with a group of eight foundation artists: Gretchen Albrecht, Jacqueline Fraser, Robert Jesson, Richard Killeen, Maria Olsen, John Reynolds, James Ross and Denys Watkins. The gallery expanded this group over the years with artists including Billy Apple, Daniel Burren, Julian Dashper, Milan Mrkusich, Marie Shannon, Yuk King Tan, Kathy Temin, Gordon Walters, Ralph Hotere, Bill Culbert, Caroline Rothwell, Mladen Bizumic, Boyd Webb, Laurence Aberhart, Denise Kum, Ani O'Neill and Richard Maloy.

== Selected exhibitions ==
=== 1992 Daniel Buren Coloured Transparency ===
Buren (France) was one of the international artists who showed with the gallery along with Sol Lewitt (USA) and Pae White (USA). The gallery also worked with Buren to produce an artist's book for his exhibition. Buren's exposure in New Zealand through this exhibition led to him being commissioned to build one of the largest sculptures on the Gibbs Farm sculpture park north of Auckland.

=== 1992 Post Black ===
Ralph Hotere and Bill Culbert met at the Sue Crockford Gallery and in this exhibition laid the ground work for their joint installation on the façade of the City Gallery, known as Fault.

=== 1993 Richard Killeen ===
This solo exhibition by Richard Killeen ‘engaged with some of the dialogue’ and used images related to the exhibition Headlands: Thinking Through New Zealand Art that had caused considerable controversy. The key issue in contention concerned Gordon Walters, a Crockford Gallery artist, who Killeen and others felt to have been demeaned both by his positioning in the exhibition and in an essay by art historian Rangihiroa Panoho.

=== 2006 Julian Dashper It is What It Isn't ===
Art critic Wystan Curnow wrote of the exhibition that it was, "one of those moments in an artist's career when the work suddenly makes a new and deeper sense to [the artist] and to their most engaged viewers".

=== 2012 John Reynolds Diptych of Triptychs ===
This was the final solo exhibition to be held at the Sue Crockford Gallery.

== Style ==
When the Sue Crockford Gallery opened in the mid-1980s, it was considered to be extremely progressive with its large exhibition space, its decision not to take part in the secondary re-sale market and a dedication to a carefully selected group of younger artists. Sue Crockford's sophisticated style was expressed in the New York look of the gallery with its high ceilings and wooden floors. The artist John Reynolds described the first exhibition space as ‘a clean white cube idea of a gallery – lots of light, lots of space for the art and minimal distraction.’
