= Headlands: Thinking Through New Zealand Art =

Exhibition of New Zealand art

Headlands: Thinking Through New Zealand Art was an exhibition of New Zealand art organised in partnership by the Museum of Contemporary Art (MCA), Sydney and the National Art Gallery, Wellington, in 1992

== History ==
Headlands: Thinking Through New Zealand Art was a partnership between the Museum of Contemporary Art (MCA) in Sydney, Australia and the National Art Gallery, New Zealand. (Note: during the development of the exhibition the National Art Gallery was restructured into a new National Museum Te Papa Tongarewa). The exhibition was shown at the MCA in Sydney from 1 April – 28 June 1992 and at Te Papa Tongarewa, Wellington from 5 September – 1 November 1992. In Sydney the exhibition included a comprehensive film programme curated by Jonathan Dennis and Merata Mita.

== The exhibition ==
The MCA presented Headlands alongside ‘Tyerabarrbowaryaou: I Shall Never Become a White Man', an exhibition of contemporary Aboriginal art. Headlands was curated by Robert Leonard and Bernice Murphy with John McCormack, Cheryll Sotheran and Cliff Whiting. Bernice Murphy, Chief Curator of the MCA, explained that the intention of Headlands was to include multiple voices and experiences and ‘to probe how the cultural traditions of Maori and Pakeha have interacted and evolved new forms’.

== Artists ==
Headlands presented 128 works by 35 artists. They were Laurence Aberhart, Sandy Adsett, Rita Angus, Lillian Budd (Merylyn Tweedie), Derrick Cherrie, Julian Dashper, Shona Rapira Davies, Neil Dawson, Don Driver, Andrew Drummond, Lyonel Grant, Bill Hammond, Terrence Handscomb, Jeffrey Harris, Christine Hellyar, Rangimarie Hetet, John Hurrell, Michael Illingworth, Megan Jenkinson, Richard Killeen, Alison Maclean, Colin McCahon, Julia Morison, Milan Mrkusich, Michael Parekowhai, Peter Peryer, John Reynolds, Theo Schoon, Marie Shannon, Michael Smither, Dennis Knight Turner, Gordon Walters, Ruth Watson, Christine Webster, Cliff Whiting.

== The publication ==
Unlike many national exhibitions Headlands was organised into seven themes: Designs for living, Headlands, Turangawaewae/A Place to Stand, Model Behavior/Self Defence, With Spirit, Inside/Out and Mod Cons. These were curated by Robert Leonard and designed to suggest new perspectives for looking at New Zealand art. This ambition was also reflected in the essays for the publication written by Bernice Murphy, Priscilla Pitts, Alexa M Johnston, Cliff Whiting, Rangihiroa Panaho, Roger Horrocks, Tony Green, Robert Leonard, Christina Barton and Francis Pound.

== Reception of Headlands in Australia ==
The critical response to Headlands in Australia was positive and thoughtful ranging from ‘a revelation’ to ‘difficult but rewarding’. Most critics saw Headlands as either an opportunity to see how ‘New Zealand responded to the same kinds of influences found in this place…’ or as an opportunity to view artists, ‘thoughtfully combating an oppressive, conformist Anglophile past while coming to terms with their Māori present. Writing in Art and Australia Daniel Thomas, art historian and the National Gallery of Australia’s inaugural Senior Curator of Australian Art, said of the exhibition ‘In Headlands, New Zealand art looked extremely interesting and very good’ and of one of the key works, ‘Whew! What irreverent bounce, what style!’.

== Reception of Headlands in New Zealand ==
It was planned to show Headlands at three venues in New Zealand: The National Art Gallery, the Auckland Art Gallery and the Dunedin Public Art Gallery. Before its return, however, both Auckland and Dunedin declined to show the exhibition. In addition, the 180-strong film programme was not included when the exhibition was shown at Te Papa Tongarewa.

This negative response was echoed in the critical reaction to the exhibition in New Zealand. Although the exhibition was large, much of the criticism focused on the absence of specific artists from the 35 selected. Some critics presented their own lists of artists they felt had been unfairly left out. Hamish Keith, a past Chair of The Queen Elizabeth II Arts Council, for instance, lamented the absence of Jenny Dolezel, Dick Frizzell, Alan Maddox, Denys Watkins and Tosswill Woollaston.

== Appropriation controversy ==
Although there was some controversy over the cost of Headlands and the loss of two venues in New Zealand, the harshest criticism was directed at one of the essays in the publication written by art historian Rangihiroa Panaho. Panaho had highlighted a published statement by artist Gordon Walters’ commenting on his koru series of work initiated by the painting Te Whiti in 1966, ‘The forms I have used have no descriptive value in themselves…’ Panaho argued that Walters had appropriated the form of the koru and stripped its cultural significance. The reaction to this critique of a senior artist was heated. Art historian Michael Dunn described it as a ‘mean-spirited attack’. Art historian Francis Pound (a key Walters supporter during the Headlands’ controversy) wrote two years later in his book The Spaces Between that Walters had in fact improved on the Māori version of the koru ‘giving power back’ to the originators. He also suggested that Walters’ forms presented the koru at ‘its maximum power’. Over time views shifted and Panaho's commentary was seen in a broader context. In a substantial retrospective review of Headlands in 2013, art historian Christina Barton, after noting that Headlands had had ‘a profound impact on New Zealand art and discourse…’, found that the appropriation debate initiated by the exhibition was ‘not so easy to quell’ and that it continues ‘to surface in the work of artists like Shane Cotton, Peter Robinson, Marie Shannon, Wayne Youle and even jeweler Warwick Freeman…’ In 2018 critic Anthony Byrt wrote that in his view Panaho had little intention of diminishing Walters’ contribution and ‘had every right to raise his concerns about Walters’ use of Maori motif’. For Byrt, Panaho had made Walters’ work seem ‘more complex; thornier examples of a peculiarly local modernism.’

== Additional reading ==
Louise Garrett, Reading Headlands, unpublished master's thesis, Wellington: Victoria University of Wellington, 1997
