= Peter Webb (art dealer) =

New Zealand art dealer, gallery director

- Born: Selwyn Peter Webb; 24 November 1933; Devonport, Auckland, New Zealand
- Died: 8 May 2019 (aged 85); Epsom, Auckland, New Zealand
- Occupations: Art dealer; gallery director; auctioneer

Selwyn Peter Webb (24 November 1933 – 8 May 2019) was a New Zealand art dealer and gallery director. He was a supporter and promoter of art, and particularly contemporary New Zealand art, for over sixty years. Webb's work spanned public art museums, publishing and the founding of the Peter Webb Galleries and Webb's auction house.

== Early years ==
Webb was born on 21 November 1933 in Devonport, Auckland, the son of Clarence Christopher Webb. He was educated at Sacred Heart College, Auckland, and Auckland University College, and joined the staff of the Auckland City Art Gallery as a 22-year-old student assistant in 1954 under the directorship of Eric Westbrook. At the Gallery, Webb met the artist Colin McCahon who was a curator and then, soon after Webb's arrival, keeper of the collections. Webb said of McCahon, "Once I fell under McCahon's spell I couldn't let him out of my sight. He was my guru." There is an early portrait by McCahon of Webb painted in July 1955. In 1957, Webb left the Auckland City Art Gallery to open the first standalone contemporary dealer gallery in the city. Peter Webb Gallery occupied a small room on the top floor of Argus House, 24 High Street. The first exhibition was a group show including McCahon, Rita Angus, Toss Woollaston, Michael Nicholson and Cora Wilding held in July, and later that year in December Colin McCahon's first solo exhibition in Auckland was opened. Titled Recent Oils, it was a small group of McCahon's Titirangi paintings.

At that time, Webb was also active in publishing, offering for sale a set of four prints by Colin McCahon, the lithographic series Puketutu, and two by Gabrielle Hope. Toss Woollaston was offered the same opportunity by Webb and, while initially agreeing, he was unable to travel to Auckland to work on the plates.

Webb closed the Argus House-based gallery in 1958. For a time he worked for a general auctioneer, and then in 1964 he started his own auction house. Using the middle name of his friend Hamish Keith, Cordy's was the first auction house in New Zealand to specialise in art as a separate category.

== Exhibitions officer: Auckland City Art Gallery ==
In 1970, Webb returned to the Auckland City Art Gallery, this time as exhibitions officer. During the next four years he was responsible for the execution, promotion and often selection of works shown in the gallery's exhibition programme. During Webb's tenure as exhibitions officer, notable exhibitions included:

- Ten Big Paintings
- Recent British Painting: A Peter Stuyvesant Foundation Collection
- Colin McCahon: A Survey Exhibition
- Surrealism
- Three New Zealand Photographers 1973

In 1973, Webb was responsible for organising a large exhibition of the British artist John Constable. Webb visited museums around the world to negotiate the 62 loans and oversee their delivery to the gallery. He then organised publicity for what turned out to be the blockbuster exhibition John Constable: the Natural Painter. The Auckland Art Gallery director at the time, Richard Teller Hirsch, wrote of Webb in the catalogue acknowledgements that his "creative and effective intensity" and "persuasive eloquence" were key to the project's success.

== Publishing ==
In 1975, Webb left the Auckland City Art Gallery and worked with Ross Fraser, who had also left the gallery, to set up Art New Zealand. The first issue was published in August 1976, the editorial noting that there had been "no regular New Zealand journal devoted entirely to the visual arts since the end of the 'forties" and that there was "no adequate consideration given to the growing number of exhibitions of contemporary painting and sculpture". This situation had been underlined by news that art critic Hamish Keith's regular reviews in the Auckland Star were to be discontinued.

With Fraser as editor, Art New Zealand was initially published six times a year, but settled into quarterly publication after its first year. It reached its one hundredth issue in Spring 2001, and is currently edited by William Dart, who took over in 1983.

In the mid to late 1970s, Webb continued his activities in publishing with series of artist prints, including Gordon Walters' signature print Tama in 1977, and in 1979 worked with Alister Taylor and John Davies to publish The New Zealander magazine.

== Peter Webb Galleries ==
In March 1975 Webb, along with former Govett-Brewster Art Gallery director Bob Ballard, helped establish and direct Barrington Pacific, a dealer gallery specialising in contemporary art as an investment. Webb selected the opening exhibition Figurative Art Now and also travelled twice to New York to secure exhibitions for the gallery. The following year, Webb opened his own dealer gallery, Peter Webb Galleries, in Lorne Street. The gallery's programme included Colin McCahon's Angels in Bed series, Gordon Walters' Koru paintings, Richard Killeen's second 'cut-outs' exhibition, and solo exhibitions by Gretchen Albrecht, Jeffrey Harris and Milan Mrkusich among many others. The exhibition and sale of Philip Clairmont's signature work Scarred Couch to Te Papa was a further highlight.

In 1981, Webb was issued a direct challenge by the artist Billy Apple. Each of Apple's canvases for his proposed exhibition Art For Sale: The Given as an Art Political Statement included the word 'Sold' with the details of the sale to be filled in when each work was purchased. The exhibition could not be opened until all sales were confirmed. Webb accepted the artist's challenge and opened the show on time. In her book Billy Apple® Life/Work, Christina Barton describes the exhibition as "a watershed not just for the artist but for New Zealand art in general".

By 1978, Peter Webb Galleries had begun to add bi-annual art auctions to its regular exhibition programme, and in November 1979 moved to a new space to give more room for exhibitions and the burgeoning auction business.

Although the auction side of the business continued, Peter Webb Galleries closed in 1993 with the exhibition Colin McCahon: The Last Painting. The auction house was sold in 2014, although continued to carry Webb's name.

== Art promotion ==
In 1979, with the help of lawyer and art collector Warwick Brown and banker Graham Reeves, Webb formed the Prospect Collection. This was Auckland's first art-collecting group. The objective behind the group's formation was to promote contemporary art, but the high prices achieved when it disbanded in 1987 and the works were auctioned at Webb's also demonstrated to collecting groups the investment potential of this sort of enterprise.

== Death ==
Webb died in the Auckland suburb of Epsom on 8 May 2019, at the age of 85.
