= Gordon H. Brown =

New Zealand artist and art historian (1931–2025)

Gordon H. Brown OBE
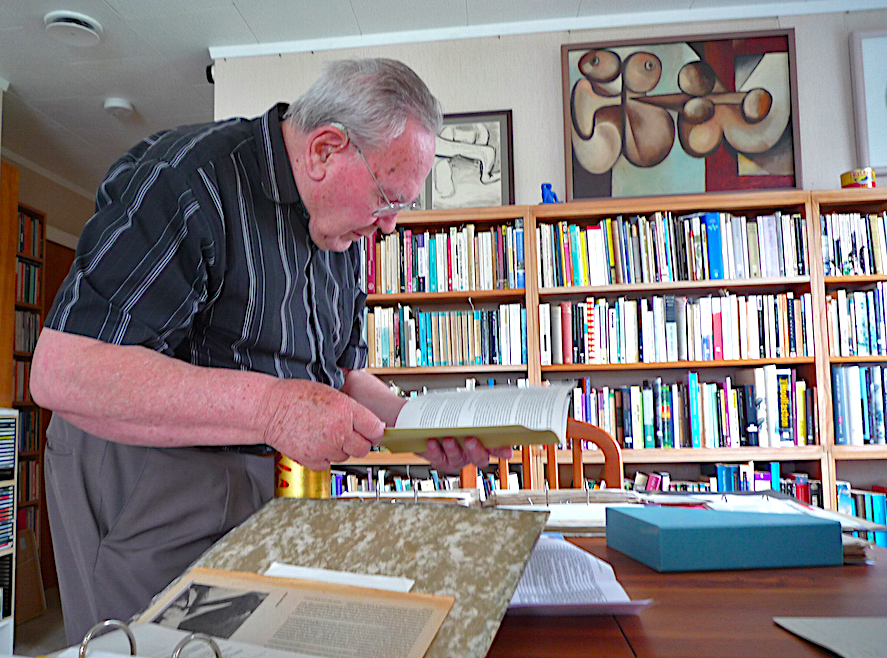
- Brown in his Waiheke library, 2012
- Born: 12 April 1931; Wellington, New Zealand
- Died: 16 March 2025 (aged 93)
- Education: Canterbury College School of Art
- Occupations: Art historian; art gallery director
- Writing career
- Subjects: Contemporary New Zealand art, Colin McCahon
- Notable work: Introduction to New Zealand Painting (with Hamish Keith)
- Notable awards: LitD (honoris causa), Victoria University of Wellington (2002)

Gordon Harold Brown OBE (12 April 1931 – 16 March 2025) was a New Zealand art historian, curator, and artist.

== Early life and education ==
Brown was born in Wellington on 12 April 1931, the son of Gwynneth and Cecil Harold Brown. He was educated at Wellington Technical College and in 1956 graduated with a Diploma in Fine Arts from the Canterbury College School of Art. In 1960, he trained as a librarian at the National Library School in Wellington and went on to work in the Alexander Turnbull Library.

== Career ==
=== Early career ===
Brown moved to Auckland in 1964 and was initially librarian-in-charge at the Elam School of Fine Arts library. The following year he took up a position at the Auckland Art Gallery Research Library. During this time Brown also kept up his art practice as a painter and photographer.

=== Interest in Colin McCahon ===
Brown developed an early interest in the work of Colin McCahon and was reviewing his work in the Auckland Star as early as 1965. He went on to write more than 30 reviews and essays devoted to the artist along with two books Towards the Promised Land: On the Life and Art of Colin McCahon and his seminal work Colin McCahon: Artist published in 1984. The two men were close friends having first met in 1952 and in 1968 they both exhibited portraits in the exhibition Face to Face at Kees Hos's New Vision Gallery in Auckland. As McCahon put it, “...he painted me and I painted him.”

=== Art history, writing, and criticism ===
In 1969, An Introduction to New Zealand Painting 1839–1967 was published, co-written by Brown and Hamish Keith. This first attempt to write a history of New Zealand art was used as a standard text and revised and enlarged as Introduction to New Zealand Painting 1839–1980 in 1982. The new edition sparked a heated argument spearheaded by art historian Francis Pound in his book Frames on the Land. Pound decried what he saw as Brown and Keith's provincial view of New Zealand art in contrast to what he considered the more relevant contemporary views held by Internationalist artists.

=== Museum career ===
In 1970, Brown was appointed director at the Waikato Art Gallery (now the Waikato Museum of Art and History) in Hamilton. He left after a year and moved to Dunedin working as the Curator of Pictures at the Hocken Library. There he curated New Zealand painting 1900–1920 Traditions and Departures, the first of three important touring exhibitions, with accompanying catalogues, that traced New Zealand's art history from 1920 to 1960.

In 1974, Brown was appointed the first professional director of the Sarjeant Gallery in Whanganui. During his three years in the role Brown introduced a number of important contemporary works into the collection including works by Don Driver, Gordon Walters, Allen Maddox, Philip Clairmont and McCahon. Brown left the Sarjeant Gallery to become a free-lance writer in 1977 citing council interference with the art gallery's professional standards and procedures as the reason.

=== Art practice ===
Brown remained a practising artist after leaving art school. In the 1960s, his paintings were selected for a number of group shows at the Auckland Art Gallery and he was invited to exhibit in Christchurch with The Group in 1962 and 1965.

In 2007, an exhibition of Brown's photographs taken during a trip to America in 1974 was exhibited at the Gus Fisher Gallery in Auckland titled Hotel North America. More recently there has been renewed interest in Brown's photography.

== Honours and awards ==
In the 1989 Queen's Birthday Honours, Brown was appointed an Officer of the Order of the British Empire, for services to art history. The following year, he was awarded the New Zealand 1990 Commemoration Medal. In 2002, he was conferred an honorary LitD degree by Victoria University of Wellington.

== Death and legacy ==
Brown died on 16 March 2025, at the age of 93.

In 2002, Victoria University of Wellington inaugurated the Gordon H. Brown lecture series, to further art historical scholarship in New Zealand.
