= Petar/James Gallery =

New Zealand art gallery

- Interactive map of the Petar/James Gallery area

General information
- Location: 56 Shortland Street, Auckland
- Coordinates: 36°50′49″S 174°46′07″E

The Petar/James Gallery was the first New Zealand dealer gallery to focus on abstract art and the idea of Internationalism.

== History ==
The Petar/James Gallery was opened in Auckland in 1972 by brothers James and Petar Vuletic, occupying part of the Law Society Building. Petar was generally the public face of the gallery telling the Auckland Star, ‘Jim and I believe in combining the best New Zealand painters in one gallery.’ The initiative disturbed the New Zealand art world as Wellington art dealer Peter McLeavey remarked, ‘the whole operation has rocked a few boats. He has the drive, charm and a quality of business that should make him a success.’ McLeavey also noted of the clean, modern gallery space that there was ‘no better private gallery in N.Z. or Australia.’ The Petar/James Gallery closed in 1978. For the rest of the 1970s and into the 1980s, often using the Petar James Gallery brand, Petar Vuletic continued to mount exhibitions, sell art and consult for collectors and corporations, including the significant Fletcher Trust Collection.

== Petar Vuletic ==
Petar Vuletic, the director of the Petar/James Gallery, began collecting art while a law student and wrote about the abstract artist Milan Mrkusich in the student newspaper Craccum as early as 1968. Around the same time, he formed a close association with Mrkusich who encouraged him to become an art dealer. In 1972, as he was setting up the Petar/James Gallery, Petar Vuletic had worked with academic art historian Michael Dunn to organize the first major retrospective of Milan Mrkusich's work at the Auckland City Art Gallery.

== Philosophy ==
The Petar/James Gallery was founded on the conviction that the Nationalist painting of New Zealand was old fashioned. In an interview, Petar Vuletic described New Zealand painting as taking, ‘a naive and simplistic view…a concern for explicitly local subject matter such as things supposedly unique to the Zealand landscape, birds, pebbles, black singlets and harsh New Zealand light’ This philosophy echoed the American critic Clement Greenberg who had visited New Zealand in 1968 and had commented that, ‘no one could expect New Zealand to turn out anything of any worth - not major art - because it was too far away from New York, Paris and London …. the factor limiting artistic progress in New Zealand was that local artists did not get many chances to see major overseas work.’ Petar Vuletic became the leading voice in arguing that the wider arts community needed to look beyond New Zealand for the future of art. This idea was strongly supported by his artists. ‘Unfortunately, too much New Zealand art is not related to overseas trends, but to a preoccupation with the landscape.’ Richard Killeen told a reporter in 1974. The Petar/James Gallery held regular Sunday meetings with Petar Vuletic encouraging younger artists like Richard Killeen, Ian Scott and Phillip O’Sullivan to join senior artists like Milan Mrkusich and Gordon Walters and participate in discussions on the development of an internationalist perspective.

== Exhibitions ==
The Petar/James Gallery opened in June 1972 with a group show titled First Exhibition which included Don Driver, Rudolf Gopas, Richard Killeen, Milan Mrkusich, Philip Trusttum and Gordon Walters. Other key exhibitions included:

1972 American Graphics which included major American artists Robert Rauschenberg, Larry Rivers and James Rosenquist. The exhibition astutely preceded the 1973 exhibition Contemporary American Prints at the Auckland City Art Gallery.

1972 Milan Mrkusich: Meta Grey and Dark Paintings. In this series Mrkusich removed all extraneous forms and presented what he later described as a ‘specific surface’.

1973 Ian Scott; Recent Paintings. Like Killeen, Scott had been a figurative painter, but by 1973 he had turned to abstraction responding to the paintings of Gordon Walters and the American artist Kenneth Noland.

1974 Gordon Walters: Gouache Studies on Paper 1953-59. The first exhibition of Walters's early abstract works on paper.

1975 Stephen Bambury: Recent Paintings (Tetragonals). Stephen Bambury was the youngest artist shown by the Petar/James Gallery. In keeping with the gallery's formalist focus, his work was ‘about disrupting the consistency of the grid.’
