= Peter McLeavey =

New Zealand art dealer (1936–2015)

Peter McLeavey ONZM
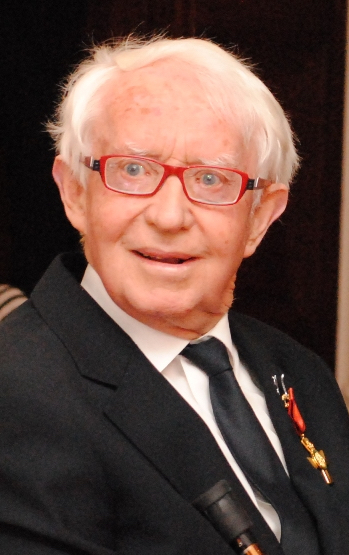
- McLeavey in 2012
- Born: Peter John Joseph McLeavey; 21 September 1936; Raetihi, New Zealand
- Died: 12 November 2015 (aged 79); Wellington, New Zealand
- Occupation: Art dealer
- Years active: 1966–2011
- Known for: Founder of Peter McLeavey Gallery; advocate for modern New Zealand art
- Honors: Honorary Doctor of Fine Arts, Massey University (2010)

Peter Joseph John McLeavey ONZM (21 September 1936 – 12 November 2015) was a New Zealand art dealer and advocate based in Wellington.

== Early life ==
Born in Raetihi on 21 September 1936, McLeavey was the son of Leslie Francis McLeavey and Elizabeth Theresa McLeavey (née McTiernan). His father worked on the railways and his childhood was spent moving around railway settlements in New Zealand's North Island, including Ohakune, Levin, Napier, Feilding, New Plymouth, Waitara, and Lower Hutt. He credited the beginning of his interest in art to a teacher at his high school in Waitara.

== Career ==
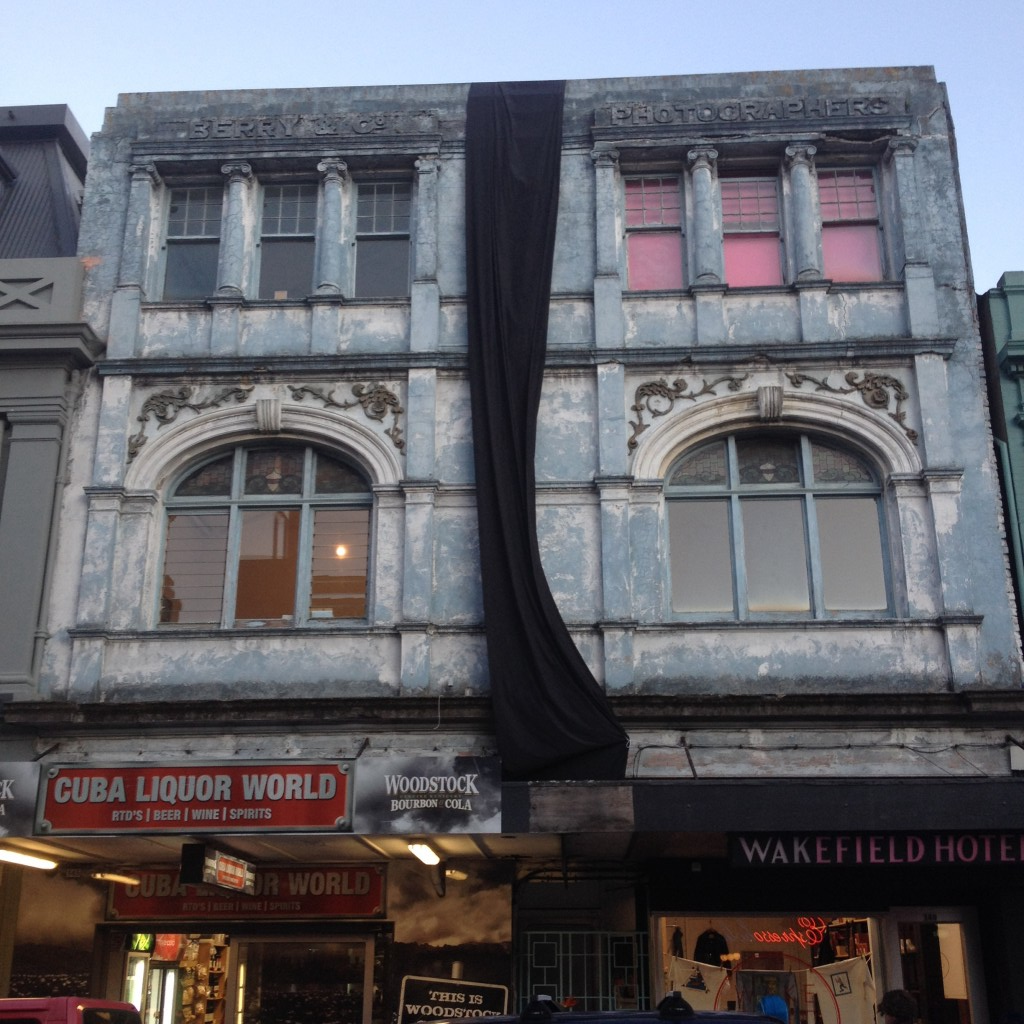
Peter McLeavey Gallery in mourning

Jeremy Diggle, Professor of Fine Arts at Massey University, called McLeavey "the most important commercial gallerist New Zealand has ever had, effectively the pre-eminent publisher of modern New Zealand art in the past 50 years". His eponymous gallery is the longest-lived in New Zealand.

McLeavey started his art dealing career in 1966, showing art in the bedroom of his apartment on central Wellington street The Terrace. His first sale was a Toss Woollaston landscape. In a 2009 documentary about his life, The Man in the Hat, McLeavey stated that he set up the gallery to "feed the culture, and to expose the culture to people who didn't know about it".

In 1968 he opened a gallery in two rooms on the first floor of 147 Cuba Street in Wellington. Alongside other early emerging dealer galleries, such as Barry Lett Galleries in Auckland, Peter McLeavey Gallery played an important role in encouraging collectors to support contemporary New Zealand artists. Among his major sales were Colin McCahon's Northland Panels to the then National Art Gallery (now the Museum of New Zealand Te Papa Tongarewa) in 1978. This is now seen as one of McCahon's most important works.

Over the years Peter McLeavey ran his gallery he exhibited some of the key names in New Zealand art including: Laurence Aberhardt, Billy Apple, Don Binney, Julian Dashper, Neil Dawson, Jacqueline Fraser, Bill Hammond, Jeffrey Harris, Pat Hanly, Michael Illingworth, Robert Jesson, Richard Killeen, Tony Lane, Allen Maddox, Colin McCahon, Milan MrKusich, Peter Peryer, John Reynolds, Peter Robinson, Ian Scott, Carl Sydow, Ray Thorburn, Yvonne Todd, Charles Tole, Warren Viscoe, Gordon Walters, Robin White and Toss Wollaston.

The gallery continues to operate at that location, and more than 500 exhibitions have been mounted there. McLeavey's daughter, Olivia McLeavey, took over the running of the gallery in 2011, when his health declined.

McLeavey with a painting by Julian Dashper in his Cuba Street Gallery, 1989

The Peter McLeavey Gallery currently represents some of New Zealand's best-known modern and contemporary artists, including Laurence Aberhart, Bill Hammond, Richard Killeen, Colin McCahon, Yvonne Todd, Robin White, Toss Woollaston, and Jeffrey Harris.

== Death and legacy ==
McLeavey died in Wellington on 12 November 2015, at the age of 79.

In September 2018, his archive was acquired by the Alexander Turnbull Library. It was scheduled to be made available by request in late 2019 or 2020.

== The Man in the Hat ==
In 2009, a documentary about McLeavey was released, directed by Luit Bieringa, produced by Jan Bieringa, and filmed by cinematographer Leon Narbey. The documentary intersperses scenes of McLeavey going about life at home, in inner-city Wellington, and in his gallery with readings by New Zealand actor Sam Neill from McLeavey's correspondence with artists.

== Peter McLeavey: The life and times of a New Zealand art dealer ==
In 2013 a biography of McLeavey by Jill Trevelyan was published by Te Papa Press. The biography, Peter McLeavey: The life and times of a New Zealand art dealer was named the 2014 New Zealand Post Book Awards Book of the Year.

== Honours and awards ==
Massey University awarded McLeavey an Honorary Doctor of Fine Arts (DFA) in 2010 and he was appointed an Officer of the New Zealand Order of Merit, for services to the arts, in the 2012 Queen's Birthday and Diamond Jubilee Honours.
