= Ray Thorburn (artist) =

New Zealand artist, art educator and museum director

- Born: 19 September 1937; Wellington, New Zealand
- Died: 16 March 2023 (aged 85); Wellington, New Zealand
- Known for: Contemporary art and art education

Raymond Wallace Thorburn (19 September 1937 – 16 March 2023) was a New Zealand artist, art educator and museum director.

== Life and education ==
Thorburn was born at Wellington Hospital in Wellington on 19 September 1937. He attended Wellington High School from 1951 to 1954. From 1955 to 1959 he completed a diploma of Fine Arts at the University of Auckland and a diploma from the Auckland Secondary Teachers College. By 1967 he was a lecturer in art at the Palmerston North Teachers Training College. Thorburn completed an MA (1975) and PhD (1981) in the United States at Ohio State University and went on to make teacher training and art education the focus of his professional life.

His roles included: Art Education Officer in the Department of Education, Director of Art Education for the Curriculum Development Division of the Department of Education where he created teaching programmes for tertiary institutions involved with art, design and craft. He was also chief executive officer of the Northland Polytechnic, Chairman of the New Zealand Industrial Design Council, CEO and president of Northland Polytechnic and Director of Waikato Museum of Art and History. He died on 16 March 2023 at Wellington Hospital.

== Art career ==
A year after finishing art school Thorburn was included in the 1960 Hay's Ltd. Art Competition (more commonly known as the Hay's Prize) with his painting Wellington Head. His first solo exhibition was at the Argus Gallery in Melbourne, Australia and four years later in 1969 he won the Manawatu Prize for Contemporary Art with Modular 10 Series 1, 1969.

In 1971 Thorburn was selected to represent New Zealand at the XI International São Paulo Art Biennale in Brazil, along with Ralph Hotere and Michael Eaton. Writing in Art International critic Bernard Denvir said of Thornley's work, ‘Of those who concern themselves with the exploration of spatial ambiguities and the solution of spatial problems within a rigidly defined area [among) the most impressive [was] the New Zealander Ray Thorburn. Primarily concerned with relationships, Thorburn also presents the spectator with the opportunity of exploring movement.

The following year Thorburn was included in the Third Biennale International de l’Estampe in Paris. In 1973 Thorburn was awarded the Frances Hodgkins Fellowship at the University of Otago.

== The evolution of Thorburn’s painting practice ==
After art school Thorburn initially worked with landscape forms often adding relief elements to the surface, but around 1967, he extended these ideas to shaped canvases that could descend down the wall to the floor. Thorburn is primarily known for his tightly painted multi-panelled modular works which he developed between around 1967 and 1973. Over this time they attracted considerable critical attention.

Gil Docking, director of the Auckland Art Gallery at the time, described how in being modular enabled them to be placed in a number of different arrangements allowing the lines on the work to present a range of optical effects, he noted how this allowed, 'illusions of space and after-images to arise on the retina of the eye."

Art historian Michael Dunn cited Thorburn himself in characterising the process as like "a modular set to a family of four brothers and sisters, each having his or her own personality and sharing in a strong family unity, yet all being capable of varying relationships with one another". The painting itself was undertaken by commercial car spray-painters which as Andrew Bogle curator at the Auckland Art Gallery noted, "violated one of the most hallowed art traditions".

Art historian Tony Green in discussing Thorburn's style when reviewing his second dealer gallery exhibition in 1970 did not feel that the effect of the multiple lines in Thorburn's work should not be relegated to the confines of optical art: "Thorburn uses these for colour enrichment, not for op-art illusions of movement."

Reviewing Thorburn’s contribution to the 1971 São Paulo Biennale, art historian Patrick Hutchings wrote how his paintings had become, "aesthetic machines." In the 1980s, reviewer Chris Parr, looking back at the Modular Series, suggested that Thorburn's use of closely drawn lines was, "suggestive of electronic circuits and laser light;" also noting that the colour palette appeared to reference psychedelic work done in the sixties.

In the early 1980s, after his return from studying for his PhD in Ohio, Thorburn's work underwent a dramatic change. The tight modular paintings gave way to image-based work incorporating "leaves from the 1982 calendar and holographs of pages from his PhD thesis". Thorburn exhibited these paintings in 1984 as the series PH & D: Piled Higher and Deeper. Art writer John Roberts put the change down to Thorburn's living in New York City with its graffiti covered trains resulting in a, "preoccupation with calligraphy."

== Thorburn and Len Lye ==
While travelling on a Queen Elizabeth II Arts Council grant in 1971, Thorburn met Len Lye in New York City. On his return to New Zealand the next year, he attempted to arrange a public museum venue for a Len Lye exhibition. Roger Horrocks, Lye's biographer, recounts that Thorburn was "shocked at the lack of interest" by the National Art Gallery and looked toward smaller provincial galleries. In New Plymouth he found that Govett-Brewster Art Gallery director Bob Ballard, who was American and knew Lye's work, and local engineer John Matthews were excited by the idea of bringing Lye's work to New Zealand. Thorburn and Matthews went to New York to talk to Lye and these discussion resulted in Matthews over-seeing the construction of the sculpture Trilogy in New Plymouth.

Thorburn continued to keep in close contact with Lye and in 1974, while on a Fulbright Scholarship, interviewed him in New York as well as documenting works in the studio. The interview was one of a series Thorburn conducted with New York artists in preparation for his master's degree from Ohio State University. In Lye's case the interview was also recorded on video. Two of Thorburn's most intriguing interviews were undertaken in 1976 and 1982 when he interviewed Colin McCahon in possibly the only taped interviews made with the artist.

Len Lye came to New Zealand in 1977 to set up the Govett-Brewster exhibition, and at that time met with Thorburn, Hamish Keith and John Matthews to discuss setting up a non-profit foundation that would be "for the public benefit of the people of New Zealand". A Trust Deed was signed in 1980 and the extensive gift Lye made of his work is now housed in the Govett-Brewster's Len Lye Centre in New Plymouth.

== Exhibitions ==
Selected solo and Group exhibitions include the following.

- 1960: Hays Ltd Art Competition, Durham Street Art Gallery (group)
- 1965: Argus Gallery, Melbourne, Australia
- 1967: Manawatu Art Prize (group) Manawatu Art Gallery, Palmerston North. Thorburn went on to win the prize in 1969.
- 1968: New Zealand Painting Today (group) Centre Gallery, Wellington
- 1970: Ray Thorburn: Paintings Peter McLeavey Gallery, Wellington. This was the first of two exhibitions Thorburn had with the dealer. The paintings were from the Modular Series and McLeavey sold three including one to Victoria University of Wellington and one to the Robert McDougall Art Gallery in Christchurch. Modular Series 2 was shown the same year at the Barry Lett Galleries, Auckland
- 1971: Centenary Exhibition of Contemporary New Zealand Painting (group) Manawatu Art Gallery, Palmerston North. (toured) Thorburn was one of 15 artists whose paintings were purchased as part of Palmerston North's Centennial celebrations.
- XI International São Paulo Biennale of Contemporary Art, Brazil
- 1972: Ray Thorburn, Victoria University.
- 1972: Third Biennale International de L’estampe (group) Paris, France
- 1973: Modular Series 5 Dunedin Public Art Gallery
- 1974: New Zealand Artists Commonwealth Games Art Festival Exhibition (group) Christchurch Art Gallery
- 1976: Benson & Hedges Art Award Finalist (group). Thorburn was also a finalist in 1978 and was include in the 1970, 1972, and 1978 Benson & Hedges exhibitions.
- 1976: New Zealand Drawing (group) Auckland City Art Gallery. Thorburn commented on his drawing Red Spot on Red Ground, ‘It is the birth of an idea, sometimes it is no more than a spontaneous visual shorthand but as an idea clarifies, the drawing becomes more specific. Often they give rise to a painting series.’
- 1983: Aspects of Recent New Zealand Art: The Grid (group) Auckland Art Gallery.
- 1985: Ray Thorburn Survey Exhibition CSA Gallery, Christchurch.
- 2001: Parts (group) Robert McDougall Art Gallery / Christchurch Art Gallery, Christchurch
- 2004: Art + Up (group) Te Manawa Art Gallery, Palmerston North
- 2006: Toi Te Papa: Art of the Nation (group) Museum of New Zealand Te Papa Tongarewa
- 2007: Ray Thorburn: Line on Line Te Manawa, Palmerston North. The exhibition featured 35 paintings dating from 1967 to 2007 along with an illustrated catalogue.
- 2010: Pieces of Eight (group) Dunedin Public Art Gallery. Along with Thorburn the exhibition included Gordon Walters, Don Peebles, Milan Mrkusich and Ralph Hotere.

== Selected works ==
- Untitled 1967 view
- Modular 3, Series 2 1970 view
- Modular Series 13, Series 2 1970 view
- Modular Series 2 1970 view
- Modular Series 1 1972 view
- Modular 4, Series 5 1973 view
