= Robin White (artist) =

New Zealand painter and printmaker

Dame Robin White DNZM
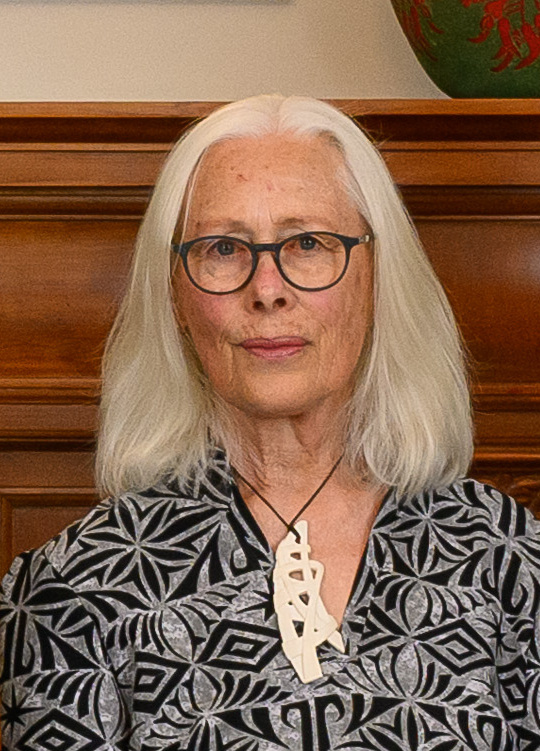
- White in 2022
- Born: Robin Adair White; 12 July 1946 (age 80); Te Puke, New Zealand
- Education: Elam School of Fine Arts
- Notable work: Mangaweka, oil on canvas
- Awards: University of Auckland Distinguished Alumni Award (2012); Arts Foundation Laureate Award (2017)

Dame Robin Adair White DNZM (born 12 July 1946) is a New Zealand painter and printmaker, recognised as a key figure in the regionalist movement of 20th-century New Zealand art.

== Early life ==
Born in Te Puke on 12 July 1946, White grew up in Epsom, a suburb of Auckland, the youngest of seven children. Her father, Albert Tikitu White, was a builder and World War I veteran of Ngāti Awa descent.

== Education ==
White completed a Diploma of Fine Arts at Elam School of Fine Arts in 1967. Along with her contemporaries Richard Killeen and Ian Scott, White was taught by Colin McCahon at Elam and has cited him as an important influence on her development and commitment as an artist.

== Career ==
After art school, White moved to Bottle Creek, Paremata, in 1969, and taught art at Mana College. Here White taught herself to screenprint, motivated by a desire to make her art more accessible and affordable. She has frequently reproduced her oil paintings as prints, such as Mangaweka (1973) in the collection of the Museum of New Zealand Te Papa Tongarewa. While at Bottle Creek, White befriended local writers including Sam Hunt, Fleur Adcock, Alistair Te Ariki Campbell, and historian Michael King.

Art historian Jill Trevelyan notes that it was while living at Bottle Creek that White developed her characteristic style, as she 'began to paint the local landscape using crisp, rhythmic outlines, strong light, and flat blocks of colours'. White became well known for these works, which often depicted scenes of small-town life, such as flat-bed trucks and fish and chip shops.

White is a member of the Baháʼí Faith, as were her parents. In 1972 White moved to Portobello, near Dunedin, where she met her husband, also a member of the religion. Here she worked full-time as an artist, while also raising their children.

In 1982 White and her family moved to the Republic of Kiribati, living on the island of Tarawa and working with the Baháʼí community. Here she continued to make art, working almost entirely in woodcut prints as materials for this method were the most readily available.

White returned to New Zealand in 1999 and is now based in Masterton, where she continues to work with weavers and artists from around the Pacific. In 2011 White was one of nine New Zealand and Australian artists selected to take part in the 'Kermadecs' research trip and exhibition project, organised by the Pew Research Center. White's collaborative exhibition of monumental ngatu (painted tapa) works, made with Tongan artist Ruha Fifita and a group of Tongan women, showed at Pataka Art + Museum in 2014.

== Notable exhibitions ==
White has represented New Zealand at a number of international exhibitions including the sixth International Biennale of Sydney and the first Asia-Pacific Triennial of Contemporary Art in Brisbane.

In 2009, her work with Leba Toki and Bale Jione was featured in the sixth Asia-Pacific Triennial of Contemporary Art.

In 2021, White was one of the 16 artists represented in an exhibition at the Mori Art Museum, Tokyo: "Another Energy—Power To Continue Challenging; 16 Women Artists from around the World". A major criterion for selection was that the artist had to have been working professionally for at least 50 years. The exhibition ran from 22 April to 26 September 2021.

White was one of four contemporary artists invited to participate in the 2021 Art Gallery of New South Wales exhibition Matisse Alive, works made in response to Henri Matisse's visit to the Pacific in 1930. She contributed the VAIOLA project.

In 2022, the Museum of New Zealand Te Papa Tongarewa featured an exhibition titled, Robin White: Te Whanaketanga Robin White: Something Is Happening Here, with more than 50 works from across White’s 50-year career that form what the artist describes as a ‘family reunion’, bringing together works from 22 galleries and living rooms across the country. It ran at Te Papa from 4 June to 18 September 2022, and then went on to Auckland Art Gallery.

== Notable works ==
- Mangaweka, 1973. Oil on canvas, 1016 × 1016 mm. First exhibited at Barry Lett Galleries, Auckland, August 1973 $475.00. Purchased by Te Papa in 1994. Original collection of Alister Taylor.
- Fish and chips, Maketu, 1975. Oil on canvas, 609 × 914 mm. Collection of Auckland Art Gallery.

== Recent exhibitions ==
- 2005 Island Life: Robin White, Hocken Collections, Dunedin, Auckland Art Gallery and Christchurch Art Gallery
- 2011 Robin White, City Gallery Wellington
- 2014 Ko e Hala Hangatonu: The Straight Path (with Ruha Fifita), Pataka Art + Museum
- 2016 Siu I Moana (with Ruha Fifita), National Gallery of Victoria
- 2021 Another Energy—Power to Continue Challenging (with fifteen other women) Mori Art Museum, Tokyo
- 2021 Matisse Alive (with three other women) Art Gallery of New South Wales
- 2022 The Perfect Silence of the Hour exhibition of works on tapa with Ebonie Fifita, at Two Rooms Gallery, Auckland.
- 2022 Robin White: Something Is Happening Here, Te Papa Tongarewa
- The retrospective exhibition Robin White: Something Is Happening Here ran from November 2022 through January 2023 at Auckland City Art Gallery - Toi O Tamaki, and opened at Dunedin Public Art Gallery on 10 March 2023.

== Honours and awards ==
In the 2003 Queen's Birthday Honours, White was appointed a Distinguished Companion of the New Zealand Order of Merit, for services to painting and printmaking. In 2009, following the restoration of titular honours by the New Zealand government, she accepted redesignation as a Dame Companion of the New Zealand Order of Merit.

In 2012, White received a University of Auckland Distinguished Alumni Award in 2012, and an Arts Foundation of New Zealand Laureate Award in 2017.

In December 2022, White was the recipient of the New Zealand Arts Icon award, which makes her one of twenty current living cultural icons.
