= Ruth Watson (artist) =

New Zealand artist (born 1962)

- Born: 1962 (age 63–64)
- Website: www.ruthwatson.net

Ruth Elizabeth Watson (born 1962), is a New Zealand artist currently living in Auckland, New Zealand.

== Education ==
Watson received a BFA in painting from the University of Canterbury School of Fine Arts, in 1984, a MVA from Sydney College of the Arts at the University of Sydney in 1999 and a PhD from the Australian National University in 2005. She also has a Postgraduate Certificate in Antarctic Studies from the University of Canterbury in 2015.

== Awards and honours ==
- 2018 Wellington Sculpture Trust, 4P6.
- 2014 Fulbright-Wallace Art Award.
- 2005 Walter W. Ristow Award for an emerging scholar in the history of cartography.
- 1994 Queen Elizabeth II Arts Council Visual Arts Fellowship.
- 1992 Oliver Spencer Bower Award.

== Residencies ==
- 2015 Headlands Centre for the Arts, Sausolito, California.
- 2009 Short term research fellowship, Newberry Library, Chicago.
- 2005 Asialink Australia Visual Arts Residency, New Delhi.
- 1992 Kunst-Werke Institute for Contemporary Art, Berlin.

== Exhibitions ==
Watson has had numerous solo and group exhibitions in both New Zealand and Australia, with some exhibitions in Germany and the United States. She has worked in sculpture, photography, installation art and painting and began working with cartographic imagery while an undergraduate in the early 1980s. Issues concerning the representation of the world have been a main focus of her work since that time. Her work has been included in several exhibitions and publications relating to art and cartography. Group exhibitions include the 9th Sydney Biennale The Boundary Rider (1992), Headlands: Thinking Through New Zealand Art (1992), Cultural Safety, Frankfurter Kunstverein and Ludwig Forum Aachen (1995 / 1996), The World Over, Stedelijk Museum, Amsterdam (1996), Living Here Now: Art and Politics (1999), Paradise Now, Asia Society Museum, New York (2004), Better Places at the Perth Institute of Contemporary Art (2008), Unnerved: The New Zealand Project Queensland Art Gallery/Gallery of Modern Art, Brisbane (2010), SCAPE Biennale of Public Art (2011), grenzūberschreitend/across boundaries, Draiflessen Collection, Mettingen Germany (2018).

The same year, she collaborated with the ANU Research School of Astronomy and Astrophysics and created the largest map of the universe at that time. She joined the staff of Elam School of Fine Arts at the University of Auckland in 2006. In the summer of 2010-2011, Watson travelled to Antarctica as part of a science-based course run by Gateway Antarctica at the University of Canterbury. She subsequently produced artworks based on her experiences. She occasionally publishes writings on other artists' work.

== Select solo exhibitions ==
- Better Places. 2008, Perth Institute of Contemporary Art (PICA), curator Melissa Keys.Exhibition catalogue
- from white darkness. 2012, Christchurch Art Gallery Outer Spaces project.

== Select group exhibitions ==
- The Boundary Rider. 1992, 9th Biennale of Sydney.
- Headlands: Thinking Through New Zealand Art. 1992.
- Cultural Safety: Contemporary Art from New Zealand. 1995-1996, Frankfurter Kunstverein, Ludwig Forum Aachen, City Gallery Wellington, curated by Greg Burke and Peter Weiermair.
- Slow Burn: Women and Photography | Ahi Tāmau: Māreikura Whakaahua. 1 March 2026 - 31 January 2027, Museum of New Zealand Te Papa Tongarewa, Te Whanganui-a-Tara Wellington.

== Collections ==
- Museum of New Zealand Te Papa Tongarewa, Wellington.
- Auckland Art GalleryToi o Tāmaki.
