= Marie Shannon =

New Zealand artist, art photographer, and teacher (born 1960)

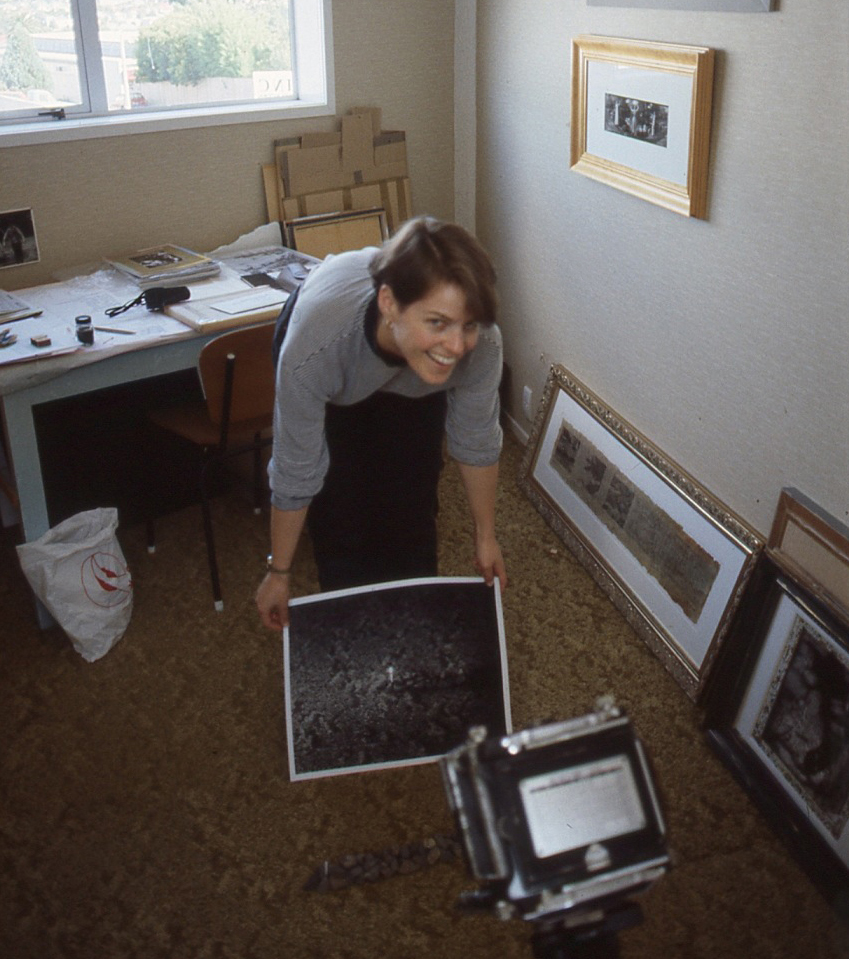
- Marie Shannon in her Auckland studio, 1989
- Born: 1960 (age 65–66); Nelson, New Zealand
- Occupation: artist
- Known for: photography, drawing, video

Marie Shannon (born 1960) is a New Zealand artist and educator who makes photography, video and drawing. Her artwork is in the collections of Te Papa, New Zealand's national museum, and Dunedin, Christchurch and Auckland city galleries.

== Background and education ==
Shannon was born in Nelson in 1960. She went to the University of Auckland Elam School of Fine Arts and graduated in 1982 with a major in photography.

Shannon is based in Auckland, New Zealand.

== Career ==
Shannon's art is often centred around her domestic interiors and the creative process between her and other artists. Shannon represented New Zealand at Australia's Asia-Pacific Triennale in 1996, and was exhibited in the Australian Centre for Photography in Sydney. Then in 1998, her work was at New Plymouth's Govett-Brewster and Melbourne's ACCA.

Shannon's partner was artist Julian Dashper who died in 2009. She has made cataloguing his artworks into art, which are text-based videos. An example is The Aachen Faxes, Christchurch remix at the Christchurch Art Gallery. In a review of a retrospective of Shannon's work, the comment is made that she was overshadowed by her partner Dashper.

As an educator she works at Unitec, Auckland.

== Selected exhibitions ==
- 1992 - Headlands: Thinking Through New Zealand Art, MCA, Sydney, Australia
- 2000 - Fissure, Five Shows, Five Curators, ACProjects, New York, USA
- 2009 - Large Still Life, Sue Crockford Gallery, Auckland
- 2009 - Love Notes (solo), Courtenay Place light boxes, Off-site project of City Gallery, Wellington
- 2009 - Marie Shannon, Hamish McKay Gallery, Wellington
- 2011 - What I Am Looking At, Sue Crockford Gallery, Auckland
- 2012 - The Aachen Faxes, Hamish McKay Gallery, Wellington
- 2015 - Julian Dashper and Friends, City Gallery Wellington
- 2015 - The things we talked about, ST PAUL St Gallery, Auckland University of Technology
- 2015 - TRUTH + FICTION, Trish Clark Gallery, Auckland
- 2016 - Notes and Letters (solo), PS Project Space, Amsterdam, Netherlands
- 2016 - THE XX FACTOR, Trish Clark Gallery, Auckland
- 2016 - this is the cup of your heart, The Dowse, Lower Hutt
- 2017 - An Architecture of Things, Trish Clark Gallery, Auckland
- 2017 - Rooms found only in the home, Dunedin Public Art Gallery
- 2018 - Rooms found only in the home (solo), Adam Art Gallery, Wellington
- 2018 - Rooms found only in the home (solo), Christchurch Art Gallery Te Puna o Waiwhetū
- 2018 - Short Stories (solo), Trish Clark Gallery, Auckland
- 2019 - Here we are, Art Gallery of New South Wales, Sydney, Australia
- 2019 - Rooms found only in the home (solo), Te Uru, Auckland
- 2020 - Rooms found only in the home (solo), Museum of Contemporary Art, Sydney, Australia (cancelled due to COVID-19)

== Selected works ==
- Sunday Afternoon 1985 view
- Born to be Tame No. 1 1987 view
- Untitled (American Gothic) 1989 view
- Dust Rat 1990 view
- The House at Night 1990 view
- Portrait of Julian Dashper 1991 view
- The House of Parmesan 1992 view
- Travel 1993 view
- I Love You Too 2005 view
- Bedroom Window Still Life 2021 view

== Collections ==
Shannon's work is held in the following permanent collections:

- Te Papa Tongarewa
- Christchurch Art Gallery Te Puna o Waiwhetū
- Dunedin Public Art Gallery
- Auckland Art Gallery Toi o Tāmiki
