= Maria Olsen (artist) =

New Zealand painter and sculptor

Maria Olsen (1947 – 21 April 2014) was a New Zealand painter and sculptor.

Olsen studied at the Ilam School of Fine Arts at the University of Canterbury from 1962 to 1964. She worked as a teacher part-time then returned to her art full-time in the 1980s.

In the 1980s Olsen lived and worked in Ponsonby, Auckland. She became renowned for her large, tactile paintings with three dimensional elements which imbued them with a sculptural quality; reflective of other elements of her practice. During this era she often repeatedly portrayed what appeared to be a large cauldron or tank in a mysterious, darkened space. This repeated motif became iconic of her work. She was a significant element of the Sue Crockford Gallery stable during this period. In 1989 she immigrated to Australia where she lived and worked in North Fitzroy, Melbourne, Victoria for some years. Maria and John then resided in Queensland until she died in 2014.

Maria Olsen was married to artist John Parry (b Ballarat, Vic). They had three daughters, who in turn followed in their career footsteps. Hannah, Mehera and Ruth, twins.

Olsen's work is held in the collections of Auckland Art Gallery, Anderson Park Art Gallery, Govett-Brewster Art Gallery, Hocken Library, James Wallace Collection, Manawatu Art Gallery and the Museum of New Zealand Te Papa Tongarewa.
