= Julian Dashper =

New Zealand artist (1960–2009)

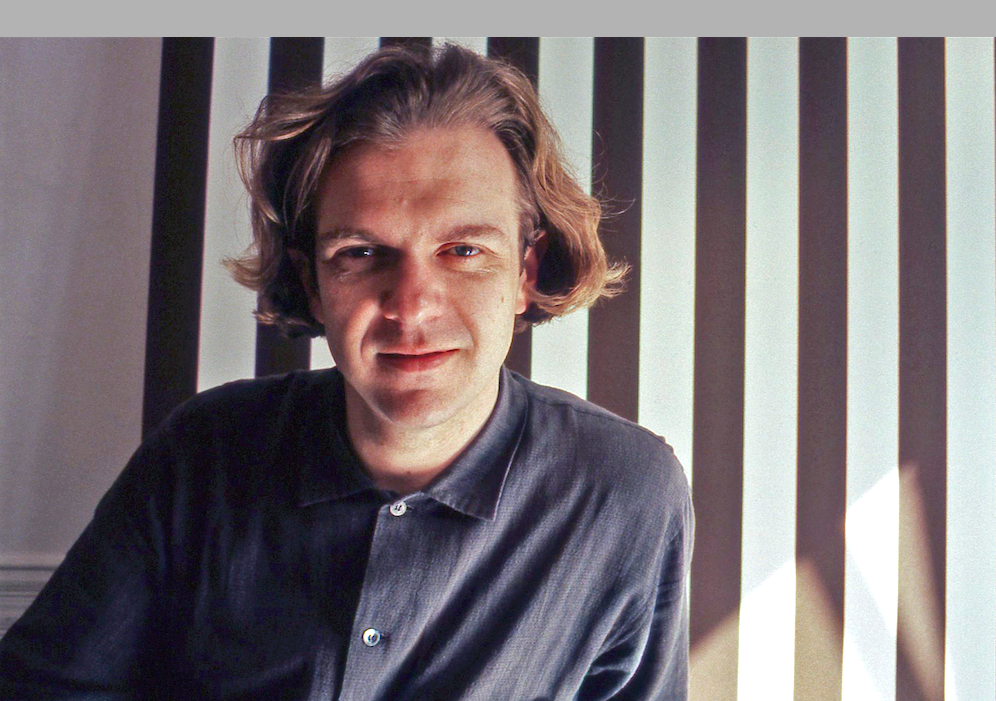
- Julian Dashper in his Auckland studio, 1991
- Born: 29 February 1960; Auckland
- Died: 30 July 2009 (aged 49)
- Education: Elam School of Fine Arts, Auckland University
- Known for: Paintings and installations
- Awards: 2001 Senior Fulbright fellowship to study in Marfa, Texas.

Julian Dashper (29 February 1960 in Auckland, New Zealand – 30 July 2009), was regarded as one of New Zealand's most well known contemporary artists.

== History ==
In 2001 he was awarded a senior Fulbright fellowship to be based as an artist in residence at the Chinati Foundation in Marfa, Texas. Dashper's work from the last 25 years has recently been the subject of a major touring retrospective in America (the first ever such exhibition for a resident New Zealand artist), curated by Christopher Cook and David Raskin.

Dashper's work focuses on the histories, theories and more general or popular ideas of abstraction (in particular abstract painting), conceptualism and minimalism as a working methodology. The geographical positioning of New Zealand globally and how this country receives and disseminates visual information is also a core subject in Dashper's work. His practice manifests itself in various forms, including paintings, unique photographs of paintings, found objects which he infuses with abstract images, various multiples plus limited edition CD and 12" polycarbonate recordings of impromptu performances he has been involved with or heavily orchestrated. He has also produced a number of video works, some of which document or describe his installations, painting and audio recordings. In 2016, arts organisation Circuit commissioned George Clark to curate a programme of moving image works, titled This is not film-making, which invited artists Gavin Hipkins, Juliet Carpenter and Gregory Kan, Daniel Malone, Louise Menzies and Nathan Gray to make works that respond to Dashper's own writings.

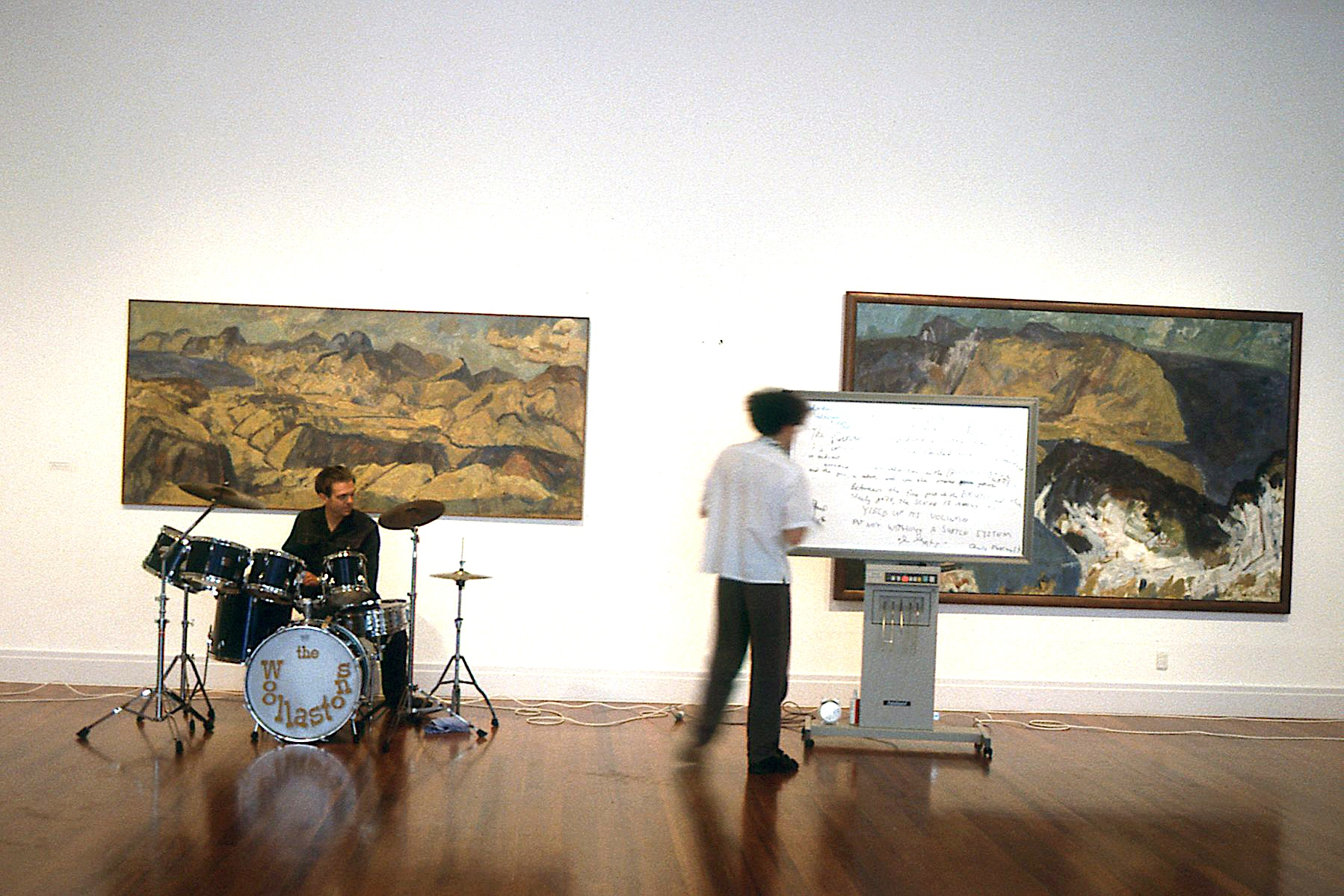
Julian Dashper and John Reynolds performing as 'The Woollastons' at the National Art Gallery in Wellington, 1992

Respectful, even affectionate references to local culture and art history are always present in Dashper's work, whilst his own adaptations of abstraction, conceptualism and minimalism fully acknowledge their lineage within international art. As curator (and director of the Adam Art Gallery in Wellington) Christina Barton expresses it, Dashper has "the unique perspective of attending to an internationalist art history from a distance, enabling him to devise strategies to work around his geographical isolation whilst simultaneously articulating its effects." Dashper is represented in all the major public collections in New Zealand: MCA, Sydney; Ludwig Forum für Internationale Kunst, Aachen, Germany; Sheldon Museum of Art, Lincoln, Nebraska; The University of Auckland Art Collection; Ulrich Museum of Art, Wichita, Kansas and the Stedelijk Museum in Amsterdam.

Julian Dashper in his Auckland studio, 1993

Visiting scholar at the University of Sydney in 2008, Dashper lived in Auckland and travelled regularly. His first New Zealand retrospective, Julian Dashper: Professional Practice, was held at the Gus Fisher Gallery in 2010. Dashper's partner, Maire Shannon, is the mother of his son, Leo, and also collated and organized his work after his death.

== Selected solo exhibitions ==
1980

- Motorway Schools 100m^{2}, Auckland. Dashper’s first public exhibition was held in an artist’s gallery run by Frank Stark. The exhibition consisted of two photographs with an accompanying soundtrack.

1986

- Julian Dashper: Paintings of 1986. Dashper’s first one-person exhibition at the Peter McLeavey Gallery.

1992

- Cover Version Artforum International Magazine January and February issues. Using the American art magazine Artforum as an exhibition space Dashper purchased space for two one-page ‘exhibitions’ one in the January edition (page 52) and one in February (page 41). The February page ran as a review of the January exhibition.
- Julian Dashper: A Survey Centre Gallery, Hamilton
- Julian Dashper: Slide Show Christchurch Art Gallery.
- Julian Dashper’s Greatest Hits Govett-Brewster Art Gallery, New Plymouth,
- The Anguses Smith's Bookshop, Christchurch. Dashper exhibited the drum kit The Anguses - a reference to the artist Rita Angus. The work would eventually form part of his installation The Big Bang Theory.

1993

- Julian Dashper Store 5 Melbourne Dashper’s first solo show outside New Zealand.
- What I am reading at the moment National Library Gallery, Wellington.

1994

- Julian Dashper: Photography 1980-1994 Manawatu Art Gallery, Palmerston North. The exhibition was curated by Athol McCredie.

1998

- The Twist Waikato Museum of Art and History, Te Whare o Waikato, Hamilton.

2001

The Chinati Foundation, Marfa, Texas, Locker Plant Locker Plant

2003

- Julian Dashper: Blue Circles City Gallery Wellington.
- I Am Nature Texas Gallery, Houston.

2005

Midwestern Unlike You and Me: New Zealand's Julian Dashper Sioux City Art Center. The exhibition, which was the first retrospective of a New Zealand artist in the United States toured to two other venues in Nebraska and Kansas.

2006

- Painting problems: the work of Julian Dashper 1990-2006 Whangarei Art Museum Te Wharetaonga o Whangarei, Whangarei.

2007

- Julian Dashper: Untitled (the last 15 seconds of the Venice Biennale) Christchurch Art Gallery.
- To the Unknown New Zealander, Christchurch Art Gallery.

2009

- Julian Dashper: Blue Circles Christchurch Art Gallery Te Puna o Waiwhetū. An exhibition of eight recordings made in front of Jackson Pollock's 1952 painting Blue Poles at the National Gallery of Australia in Canberra.

2010

- Julian Dashper: It is Life Minus Space Brooklyn, New York.
- Julian Dashper: Professional Practice Gus Fisher Gallery .

2015

Julian Dashper & Friends City Gallery Wellington. The exhibition was curated by Robert Leonard and a video of the exhibition by the City Gallery can be viewed on YouTube.

== Selected works ==
- Anglican Church at Matauri Bay 1985 view
- Cass Altarpiece 1986 view
- Cass 1986 view
- Mural for a Contemporary House No 4 1988 view
- Untitled 1991 view
- The Woollastons 1992 view
- The Drivers 1993 view
- Untitled 1996 view
- Untitled [6-25] 1997 view

Untitled (The Warriors) 1998. Vinyl on drumheads with junior drumkit. Dimensions variable. Courtesy of the artist, Sue Crockford Gallery, Auckland and Kaliman Gallery, Sydney. Photo by Ashley Barber.

Copyright Julian Dashper

This is a two-dimensional representation of a copyrighted sculpture, statue or any other three-dimensional work of art. As such it is a derivative work of art, and per US Copyright Act of 1976, § 106(2) who owns copyright of the original has the exclusive right to authorise derivative works. Per § 107 it is believed that reproduction for criticism, comment, teaching and scholarship constitutes fair use and does not infringe copyright. It is believed that the use of a picture to illustrate the three-dimensional work of art in question, to discuss the artistic genre or technique of the work of art or to discuss the artist or the school to which the artist belongs on the English-language Wikipedia, hosted on servers in the United States by the non-profit Wikimedia Foundation, qualifies as fair use under United States copyright law. Any other uses of this image, on Wikipedia or elsewhere, might be copyright infringement. To the uploader: please add a detailed fair use rationale for each use as well as copyright information on the original artwork.

- Abstract Abstract 1998 view
- Untitled 2000 view
- Untitled 2005-2006 view
- The Grey in Grey Lynn 2006 view
