= Ian Scott (artist) =

New Zealand artist (1945–2013)

- Born: Ian Christopher Scott; 20 April 1945; Bradford, England
- Died: 27 June 2013 (aged 68); Auckland, New Zealand
- Education: Elam School of Fine Arts, Auckland
- Known for: Painting
- Movement: Realism, Pop Art, Modernism, Post-Modernism
- Spouse: Nan Corson
- Awards: Fowlds Memorial Prize 1967, Benson and Hedges Art Award 1968, Manawatu Art Prize 1969–70
- Website: ianscott.co.nz

Ian Christopher Scott (20 April 1945 – 27 June 2013) was a New Zealand painter. His work was significant for pursuing an international scope and vision within a local context previously dominated by regionalist and national concerns. Over the course of his career he consistently sought to push his work towards new possibilities for painting, in the process moving between abstraction and representation, and using controversial themes and approaches, while maintaining a highly personal and recognisable style. His work spans a wide range of concerns including the New Zealand landscape (especially West Auckland), popular imagery (particularly the representation of the female figure), appropriation and art historical references. Scott's paintings are distinctive for their intensity of colour and light. His approach to painting is aligned with the modernist tradition, responding to the formal standards set by the American painters Morris Louis, Kenneth Noland and Jules Olitski.

== Biography ==
=== Early life ===
Ian Scott was born in Bradford, England, on 20 April 1945, the oldest of five sons. His family initially lived in the village of Baildon on the Yorkshire Moors near Bradford. In 1952, when Scott was seven, his parents, Barbara (Cox) and John Scott, moved the family to Auckland, New Zealand, seeking a life that offered more opportunity than the severe world of post-World War II England.

=== Education ===
Scott's early interest in art, before moving to New Zealand, was fostered by his maternal grandfather, Ernest Cox, an amateur watercolourist. Scott would make sketches as he accompanied his grandfather on painting trips around the moors. In Auckland, he painted landscapes in both oils and watercolour of Sunnyvale, the Waitākere Ranges and the West Coast and, when he attended Kelston Boys' High School, took art classes with the prominent New Zealand painter Garth Tapper and Rex Head, a regular entrant in the Kelliher Art Award for landscape painting. In 1963 Scott attended evening classes run by Colin McCahon at the Auckland Art Gallery. In 1964 he began studies at the University of Auckland's Elam School of Fine Arts, and in 1965 his tutors there included Tapper and McCahon. Scott up a friendship with fellow student Richard Killeen, and during his time at art school also met Michael Dunn, who became an important historian of New Zealand art, and Petar Vuletic, a controversial critic and later partner of the Petar/James Gallery that would include Scott as one of its artists. Scott completed his Diploma in Fine Arts with Honours in 1967, and was awarded the Fowlds Memorial Prize. The following year he began training as a Secondary School teacher at the Auckland Teachers' Training College.

=== Family ===
Scott met Nan Corson in 1978. They briefly lived in the Auckland suburb of Epsom before purchasing a house in Mt Eden. Their son, Chris Corson-Scott, was born in 1985, and is an artist working in the medium of photography in Auckland, New Zealand.

== Main periods and series of work ==
=== Early work ===
Scott established an early reputation as a landscape painter, winning the junior section of the Kelliher Art Award in 1965 with Low Tide, Anawhata (Kelliher Art Trust) and a Merit Prize in 1966. During this period, while studying at Elam, he also painted abstract works and developed a representational style which he referred to as "New Realism". The latter were informed by developments in American painting of the early 1960s, such as the Pop Art of James Rosenquist, and include paintings of suburban weatherboard houses (characteristic of 1960s West Auckland), often placed incongruously in landscape settings such as Milford Sound or Auckland's West Coast. Some of these paintings are made up of two panels and divided into several separate images. Lockheed L-188 Electra aircraft are sometimes visible in the sky, and in several paintings, including Air Disaster Over Mt Sefton (1967, Wallace Arts Trust), two or more aircraft crash spectacularly and comically. In these early paintings we see the beginnings of the kind of disjunctive imagery, or collisions of different traditions and realities, that became a conspicuous feature of Scott's work.

=== "New Realist"/"Girlie" series, 1967–70 ===
Ian Scott. Leapaway Girl, 1969. Oil on canvas, 1725 x 1515 mm. The Museum of New Zealand Te Papa Tongarewa. Purchased 1971 from Wellington City Council Picture Purchase Fund

Ian Scott. Track, 1968. Oil on canvas, 1730 x 1730 mm. Auckland Art Gallery Toi o Tāmaki, purchased 2004

In 1967 Scott's stylised landscapes began to feature women clad in bikinis or fashionable garments of the era such as mini skirts – images that were often appropriated from popular culture, including magazines (such as Vogue and Playboy) and newspapers. They feature landscapes that capture the distinctive emblems of West Auckland, such as native forest and Kauri trees and West Coast beaches. The style of painting, with meticulously and smoothly rendered transitions and details, knowingly takes up the "hard-edged" tradition in New Zealand painting associated with Rita Angus, McCahon and Don Binney. Scott's paintings of the 1967–70 period have been labelled the "Girlie" series on account of their frolicking, scantily clad female protagonists. Important examples of works that fit this description include Land of Dreams (1968–69, private collection), Rainbow Girl (1969, Waikato Museum of Art and History Te Whare Taonga o Waikato), Homage to Morris Louis (1969, Real Art Roadshow), Jumpover Girl (1969, Victoria University of Wellington), Leapaway Girl (1969, Museum of New Zealand Te Papa Tongarewa) and Sky Dash (1969–70, Auckland Art Gallery Toi o Tāmaki), Agronomist (1970) and Teller (1970).

Leapaway Girl is probably the most well-known of these works, which former curator at Te Papa William McAloon has described as being "produced at a time when the histories of New Zealand painting were being written and the identification of an authentic local tradition – one rooted in the landscape, the harsh New Zealand light and its clearly delineated forms – was paramount." However, McAloon also acknowledges the international influences Scott was fusing with New Zealand art, writing: "Not that all the references are local: elsewhere in the series Scott drew on images of contemporary American abstraction, and even here the bold colours of the leaping frock suggest a color field painting gone airborne. More obvious touchstones for the series are American pop artists Mel Ramos, in his paintings of pin-ups, and Tom Wesselmann in his Great American Nude series." Leapaway Girl was one of 166 paintings included by the Museum of New Zealand in their 2012 launch of their online collection.

However, there are a large number of paintings in the series, including major examples, that do not fit the popular perception of the "Girlie" series. These include portraits of notable figures in the artist's life, such as his brother (Nigel at Anawhata, 1968–69), fellow artists (Colin McCahon in North Otago, 1967–68, Hocken Library, University of Otago; Don Binney at Te Henga, 1969–70, Auckland Art Gallery Toi o Tāmaki) and his Wellington dealer (Peter McLeavey, 1969–70, Collection of Peter McLeavey). Others have images of couples and children, both idealised and absurd (Offspring, 1969, Table Baby, 1970, and Golden Dreams, 1969, Te Manawa, Palmerston North).

Track (1968, Auckland Art Gallery Toi o Tāmaki) is based on a photograph of the publisher – and protector of endangered Kauri forests – A.H. Reed with his daughter and grandchildren; Scott has them posing stolidly in front of an Auckland Regional Council sign and a stand of Kauri trees. The radical and iconic nature of this painting prompted the poet and art-writer David Eggleton to exclaim that it "charges out of the late 1960s like a rogue elephant," a phrase that nicely captures Scott's propensity for brazenly disrupting the norms and conventions of New Zealand art.

=== The Nelson years, 1971–73 ===
Scott's teacher-training obligated him to take up a teaching position upon completion of the programme. He moved to Nelson and taught art at Nelson College. Over the next couple of years he painted the Tasman Bay series – ostensibly abstract paintings, though with a landscape feeling, which have thick fields of muted colour, greens and yellows predominantly, and reflect Scott's interest in the "thick field" paintings of the American Larry Poons. Also from the Nelson period is a series of paintings with flat, cartoonish figurative elements as well as abstract shapes and textures (such as an effect resembling the stucco cladding of his rented flat). The overall significance of the paintings of this period lies in the way the artist translates the feelings and imagery of his immediate environment into an abstract idiom directly comparable with developments in American modernism, particularly the paintings of Poons and Olitski. In 1971 Scott visited Auckland to see an exhibition of paintings by Morris Louis at the Auckland Art Gallery. The exhibition left a lasting impression, and Scott was particularly impressed by the almost 24-foot long Unfurled painting, Beta Nu (1960, National Gallery of Australia, Canberra).

=== The Roller-stroke and Sprayed Stripe Paintings, 1971–73 ===
Ian Scott. Quiver, 1974. Acrylic and enamel on canvas, 2360 x 1440 mm. Auckland Art Gallery Toi o Tāmaki, purchased 1975

In 1973 Scott returned to Auckland, and produced a series of large abstract paintings using paint rollers and commercial house paint. The paint is rolled on freely and casually in wide swathes or chunky arcs and blocks. These works evolved into the Sprayed Stripes, which spanned the years 1973–75. The "classic" examples from this series are composed of brightly coloured parallel bands, applied with spray cans, contained by a pale coloured rectangle that floats at an angle just off the vertical axis of a tall, rectangular, white-painted canvas. The most famous example of this series is probably Quiver (1974, Auckland Art Gallery Toi o Tāmaki). These paintings were described by critic and art historian Edward Hanfling in 2005 as "the most significant paintings produced in this country [New Zealand], outside of Scott's recent white Model Series paintings." The particular colour range of the Sprayed Stripes captures both the intense light of Auckland and the pastel hues typically used by suburban home-owners to paint their weatherboard houses. In using spray cans, Scott was also trying to evoke the sensibility of the home handyman, the DIY culture of suburban New Zealand. However, Scott's feelings for this local environment were by no means expressed in an illustrative or representational idiom. Rather, they were condensed and emblematised, absorbed into a formal language that drew inspiration from American modernism, particularly the paintings of Morris Louis and Kenneth Noland.

=== The Lattices ===
Ian Scott. Lattice No. 58, 1979. Acrylic on canvas, 1727 x 1730 mm. Museum of New Zealand Te Papa Tongarewa, purchased 1980

In 1975 Scott produced a large number of works on paper that contain the basic ingredients of what became the Lattice series, an immense body of acrylic abstract paintings that he worked on intensively during the second half of the 1970s, and which he returned to repeatedly throughout the rest of his life. The Lattice paintings are typically based on a flexible, constantly varied system of usually diagonal, interlaced bands of colour, within a square canvas. "The basic over and under pattern which holds the forms meshed together on the picture surface is common to all the paintings of the Lattices." Early examples from 1976 to 1977, such as Lattice No. 11 (May 1977, Christchurch Art Gallery), have white horizontal and vertical as well as diagonal bands, their edges marked by black crayon rubbed along the edges of masking tape, with brightly coloured bands seeming to form a grid behind the white bands. From 1978 onwards, the crayon lines were eliminated in favour of clean, masked edges of abutted colour, and with the exception of the Asymmetrical Lattices the square canvas became the standard support. A key example of this highly resolved system is Lattice No. 45 (1978, Dunedin Public Art Gallery), with which Scott won the 1978 Benson & Hedges Art Award. Scott invented a considerable range of compositions within the overall Lattice series, varying the width, layout and organisation of the bands as well as the range and intensity of the colours. A number of works, such as Lattice No. 58 (July 1979, Museum of New Zealand Te Papa Tongarewa), have black bands alternating with high-keyed colours, whereby, as art historian Elva Bett observed, "a vast three-dimensional depth is created as the bands of strident colour whip and pull beyond the canvas". Others are pared back to white against raw canvas, or black and raw canvas. An example of the latter is Lattice No. 91 (1982, Museum of New Zealand Te Papa Tongarewa).

=== Model series, 1996–2007 ===
The Model series brings together elements of Scott's figurative work and his ongoing commitment to the modernist ambition of inventing new pictorial structures (the way in which the visual elements of a painting are arranged on the canvas surface). Just as in many of the earlier "New Realist" paintings, Scott was both exploring and challenging the tradition of the nude with reference to contemporary popular culture. The paintings feature women from soft-porn magazines standing in front of paintings, usually representations of modernist abstract or Pop works that appear to be hanging on the exterior walls of suburban houses or on the white walls of an art gallery. The style of the paintings, particularly those before 2004, is notable for the physicality of the brushwork, with the artist seeking to avoid an overly clean and detailed effect in favour of emphasising the materiality and construction of the image. A significant development in the series came with the lateral extension of the picture format, the figure positioned to one side of an abstract expanse of white canvas. Model Series No. 80: The End of Louis (April 2006) alludes to Morris Louis's painting, Beta Nu (1960, National Gallery of Australia, Canberra), one of the sources of inspiration for this new "open" pictorial structure.

== Controversies ==
=== "Girlie" paintings ===
Scott's "Girlie" paintings, though critically acclaimed, were also controversial when they were first exhibited in the late 1960s due to the display of nudity that was then considered too explicit in New Zealand's relatively conservative society. The painting Lawn Lovers (1969), which was a finalist in the 1969 Manawatu Art Prize, was banned from exhibition in the regional centres of Palmerston North and Hamilton after a public outcry in which the gallery received letters of complaint. The Hawkes Bay newspaper, The Daily Telegraph, ran an article that recorded reactions of outrage to the painting. In a strange and unfortunate twist, the painting was later loaned to a friend of the artist, and changed hands several times leading to its eventual destruction.

When Scott entered two more "Girlie" paintings in the 1970 Manawatu Art Prize, Sky Leap (1970) and Table Baby (1970), Waikato Times critic, G.E. Fairburn, described them as "repellent", adding that they "need to be seen to be believed".

=== Model series ===
In 2007 an exhibition of Scott's Model series paintings at the Centre of Contemporary Art (CoCA) in Christchurch came under fire from members of the public, community organisations and critics, and generated intense online debate. Director of CoCA at the time, Warren Feeney, subsequently wrote: "Has any series of paintings ever been more loathed?"

== Key exhibitions ==
- Minimal Lattices: 1978-1988, Hamish Mckay Gallery, Wellington, 2019
- Realist paintings from the late 1960s, Michael Lett, Auckland, 2019
- Kaleidoscope: Abstract Aotearoa, Museum of New Zealand Te Papa Tongarewa, Wellington, 2018-2020
- Sprayed Stripes and New Lattices, Michael Lett, Auckland, 2017
- Local Revolutionaries: Art & Change 1965 – 1986, Auckland Art Gallery, 2010–11
- Toi Te Papa: Art of the Nation, Museum of New Zealand Te Papa Tongarewa, Wellington, 2004–12
- Telecom Prospect, City Gallery Wellington, 2004
- Everyday Minimal, New Gallery, Auckland Art Gallery, 2004
- Vuletic and His Circle, Gus Fisher Gallery, Auckland, 2003
- Representation and Reaction: Modernism and the New Zealand landscape Tradition, Sarjeant Gallery, Whanganui, 2002
- New Visions: Beginning the Contemporary in New Zealand Art, Auckland Art Gallery, 2001
- Primary Structures, Robert McDougall Contemporary Art Annex, Wellington, 1997
- The Grid, Auckland Art Gallery, 1983
- Print Sampler, Auckland Art Gallery, 1981
- Auckland Artists, Auckland Art Gallery, 1978
- New Zealand Young Contemporaries, Auckland Art Gallery, 1977
- New Zealand Drawing, Auckland Art Gallery, 1977
- Abstract Attitudes, Auckland Art Gallery, 1976
- Richard Killeen & Ian Scott, Barry Lett Galleries, Auckland, 1969
- Manawatu Art Prize, Manawatu Art Gallery, Palmerston North, 1969
- Benson & Hedges Art Award, Barry Lett Galleries, Auckland, 1968

== Legacy ==
Scott died in Auckland in 2013 and was buried at Waikumete Cemetery. In a review of the cultural highlights of 2013, The Press newspaper mentioned "Ian Scott whose untimely death robbed New Zealand of a vital artistic voice". In a tribute to Scott, the Auckland Art Gallery concluded "Few other local painters have been as prolific as he was, even fewer as determined to explore such diverse and, sometimes, divisive content".

=== Work in museum collections ===
- Auckland Art Gallery Toi o Tāmaki
- The Museum of New Zealand Te Papa Tongarewa
- National Gallery of Australia
- Dunedin Public Art Gallery
- Christchurch Art Gallery Te Puna o Waiwhetu
- The Dowse Art Museum
- Sarjeant Gallery Te Whare o Rehua Whanganui
- The Suter Art Gallery Te Aratoi o Whakatū
- The James Wallace Arts Trust
- The Fletcher Trust Collection

== Publications about Scott ==
- Brown, Warwick. Ian Scott. Auckland: Marsden Press, 1998. ISBN 978-0-473045197
- Brown, Warwick. Ian Scott Paintings: 1986 – 1989. (exhibition catalogue), Hamilton: Centre for Contemporary Art, Hamilton, 1993.
- Dunn, Michael. Ian Scott Paintings: 1968 – 1982. (exhibition catalogue), Auckland: Lopdell Gallery, 1991.
- Hanfling, Edward. Ian Scott: Lattices. Auckland: Ferner Galleries, 2005. ISBN 978-0-958267007
- Hanfling, Edward. Ian Scott: The Model Series Paintings: 1996 – 2004. Auckland: Ferner Galleries, 2004.
- Sibson, Tracy. There & Back: Ian Scott 1960 – 1996. (exhibition catalogue), Hamilton: Waikato Museum of Art and History, 1998.

=== Further reading ===
- Bett, Elva. New Zealand Art: A Modern Perspective. Auckland: Reed Methuen, 1986.
- Bogle, Andrew. Aspects of Recent New Zealand Art. The Grid: Lattice and Network. (exhibition catalogue), Auckland: Auckland City Art Gallery, 1983.
- Brown, Gordon & Hamish Keith. An Introduction to New Zealand Painting 1839–1980. Auckland: David Bateman, 1988.
- Brown, Warwick. 100 New Zealand Paintings. Auckland: Godwit, 1995.
- Brownson, Ron, ed. Art Toi: New Zealand Art at Auckland Art Gallery Toi o Tāmaki. Auckland: Auckland Art Gallery, 2011.
- Caughey, Elizabeth & John Gow. Contemporary New Zealand Art 1. Auckland: David Bateman, 1997.
- Docking, Gil, Michael Dunn & Edward Hanfling. Two Hundred and Forty Years of New Zealand Painting (revised). Auckland: David Bateman, 2012.
- Dunn, Michael. New Zealand Painting: A Concise History (revised). Auckland: Auckland University Press, 2003.
- Dunn, Michael. Contemporary Painting in New Zealand. New South Wales: Craftsman House, 1996.
- Dunn, Michael. A Concise History of New Zealand Painting. Auckland: David Bateman, 1991.
- Eggleton, David. Towards Aotearoa: A Short History of 20th Century New Zealand Art. Auckland: Reed Publishing, 2007.
- Hammonds, Lucy & Douglas Lloyd Jenkins. Architecture of the Heart. Napier: MTG Hawke's Bay, 2013.
- Hanfling, Edward & Alan Wright. Vuletic and His Circle. Auckland: Gus Fisher Gallery, The University of Auckland, 2003.
- Johnson, Alexa, ed. Auckland Art Gallery Toi o Tāmaki: The Guide. Auckland: Auckland Art Gallery, 2001.
- Johnston, Alexa. Ian Scott: Colour Chords and White Lattices, Artist Project No. 3. (exhibition catalogue), Auckland: Auckland City Art Gallery, 1982.
- Johnstone, Christopher. Landscape Paintings of New Zealand: A Journey From North to South (revised). Auckland: Godwit, 2013.
- Keith, Hamish. The Big Picture: A History of New Zealand Art from 1642. Auckland: Random House, 2007.
- King, Richard. The Kelliher: 67 Award Winning Paintings of the New Zealand Landscape and Its People. Auckland: Orakau House, 1979.
- McAloon, William, ed. New Zealand Art: From Cook to Contemporary. Wellington: Te Papa Press, 2010.
- McAloon, William, ed. Art at Te Papa. Wellington: Te Papa Press, 2009.
- McAloon, William, ed. Victoria's Art: A University Collection. Wellington: Adam Art Gallery, 2005.
- O'Brien, Gregory. We Set Out One Morning: Works from the BNZ Art Collection. Auckland: Bank of New Zealand, 2006.
- Pound, Francis. Forty Modern New Zealand Paintings. Auckland: Penguin Books, 1985.
- Ross, James. New Zealand Modernism – The Content of Form. Paintings from the Jenny Gibbs Collection, Vol. 3. Auckland: 1997.
- Shaw, Peter. Rainbow Over Mt Eden: Images of Auckland. Auckland: Godwit & Random House, 2002.
- Shaw, Peter. Representation and Reaction. Auckland & Whanganui: Fletcher Trust & Sarjeant Gallery, 2002.
- Sinclair, Alex & John Yealsley, eds. Risk and the Institutions of Government. Wellington: Victoria University Press, 1999.
- Thomas, Nicholas. Rethinking Visual Anthropology. New Haven & London: Yale University Press,1997.
- Trevelyan, Jill. Peter McLeavey: The Life and Times of a New Zealand Art Dealer. Wellington: Te Papa Press, 2013.
- Wolfe, Richard. New Zealand Portraits. Auckland: Penguin/Viking, 2008.
