= Richard Killeen =

New Zealand artist (born 1946)

Richard John Killeen ONZM (born 1946) is a significant New Zealand painter, sculptor and digital artist.

== Biography ==
Richard Killeen in his Auckland studio, March 1985

Killeen was educated at the Elam School of Fine Arts, where his lecturers included Colin McCahon, before graduating in 1966. He has won a number of awards, including the QE2 Arts Fellowship, and has been the subject of several major exhibitions. He is particularly known for his arranged collections of aluminium 'cut outs' hung on walls, from 1978 onwards, and has continued arrangements of objects in this style. In the 2002 Queen's Birthday and Golden Jubilee Honours, he was appointed an Officer of the New Zealand Order of Merit, for services to painting.

== Style ==
His early cut-outs reflected Killeen's "discontent with the compression caused by the four static points of the frame," and an answer was found in their "off-stretcher presentation." These are created from cardboard templates, which he uses to cut aluminium sheeting, lacquer, and paint.

== Selected exhibitions ==
1967

- The Group Show 68 Christchurch, Durham St. Art Gallery. Killeen had five works in the exhibition. (group) and two works Soldier and Microphone Man in the 1968 Group Show.

1968

- This Land Barry Lett Galleries, Auckland. (group)

1969

- Manawatu Prize for Contemporary Art Palmerston North Art Gallery. (group)

1970

- Paintings April 1969-April 1970 Barry Lett Galleries, Auckland.
- New Zealand Art of the Sixties: a Royal Visit Exhibition Auckland City Art Gallery. (group)

1972

- Richard Killeen Petar James Gallery, Auckland. Along with being part of the opening group exhibition with Don Driver, Rudi Gopas, Milan Mrkusich, Philip Trusttum and Gordon Walters earlier in the year Killeen was also represented by a solo exhibition in 1972 along with solo shows in 1973 and 1974.

1975

- Richard Killeen: Recent Paintings Peter McLeavey Gallery (later McLeavey Gallery), Wellington. Killeen’s first solo exhibition with Peter McLeavey will be the first of fifty held up to 2024.

1976

- New Zealand Drawing 1976 Auckland City Art Gallery. (group)

1977

- Young Contemporaries Auckland City Art Gallery. (group) Killeen was represented with Frog Shooter a painting purchased at the time of the exhibition by the Auckland Art Gallery.

1979

- Richard Killeen Peter Webb Galleries, Auckland. From 1979 to 1981 Killeen would have 14 exhibitions with Peter Webb.

1981

Richard Killeen Brooke/Gifford Gallery, Christchurch. The first of ten solo exhibitions Killeen would have with the gallery.

1982

- Artist Project No.1. Chance and Inevitability Auckland City Art Gallery. Curator of the project Alexa Johnston explained in the catalogue how Killeen allowed people attending the projects opening were allowed to take one of the cut-out pieces and hang them anywhere they chose on the wall. The final work she noted, ‘took shape gradually with the involvement of a large number of people'.
- Vision in Disbelief: The 4th Biennale of Sydney, Art Gallery of New South Wales, Sydney. (group)
- Seven Painters/The Eighties Sarjeant Gallery, Wanganui. (group)

1983

- Chance and Inevitability Robert McDougall Art Gallery, Christchurch. The installation, also shown at the Peter McLeavey Gallery in Wellington followed the same format as the Auckland exhibition the previous year.
- New Image, Aspects of Recent N.Z. Art Auckland City Art Gallery. (group)
- The Grid, Lattice and Network, Aspects of Recent N.Z. Art Auckland City Art Gallery. (group)

1984

- Richard Killeen Ray Hughes Gallery, Brisbane
- Richard Killeen New Vision Gallery, Auckland
- Richard Killeen Bertha Urdang Gallery, New York

1985

- Richard Killeen, Sue Crockford Gallery, Auckland
- Origins originality & beyond: the Sixth Biennale of Sydney Art Gallery of New South Wales, Sydney. (group) The exhibition was curated by Nick Waterlow.
- Content/Context National Gallery, Wellington. (group)

1988

- NZXI Auckland City Art Gallery. (group)

1989

- Lessons in Lightness Ray Hughes Gallery, Sydney

1990

- Richard Killeen, Sampler 1967-1990 Sue Crockford Gallery, Auckland. Curated by Francis Pound.

1991

- Signatures of Place Govett Brewster Art Gallery, New Plymouth.
- Cross Currents: Contemporary New Zealand and Australian Art from the Chartwell Collection Waikato Museum of Art and History, Hamilton. (group)
- Home Made Home Wellington City Art Gallery. (group)

1992

Headlands: Thinking Through New Zealand Art Museum of Contemporary Art, Sydney.

1995

- A Very Peculiar practice, Aspects of Recent New Zealand Painting City Art Gallery, Wellington. (group)

1996

- The Dreaming of Gordon Walters Sue Crockford Gallery, Auckland.

1998

- Dream Collectors, One Hundred Years of Art in New Zealand Museum of New Zealand Te Papa Tongarewa, Wellington. (group) The exhibition was curated by Ian Wedde and John Walsh.

1999

- Stories We Tell Ourselves, The Paintings of Richard Killeen Auckland Art Gallery. A touring survey of Killeen’s work to-date curated by Francis Pound.

2000

- Wonderlust Ivan Anthony Gallery, Auckland.

2001

- Prospect 2001: New Art New Zealand City Gallery, Wellington. (group)

2003

- Ladybird Brett McDowell Gallery, Dunedin.

2005

- Nature Culture Dunedin Public Art Gallery. (group)

2005

- Mixed-up Childhood Auckland Art Gallery, Auckland. (group)

2007

- Something Old Something New Te Tuhi Centre for the Arts, Manukau City. (group)

2010

- Unnerved, The New Zealand Project Gallery of Modern Art, Brisbane. (group)

2021

- Repetition Brett McDowell Gallery, Dunedin.

2024

- Banners McLeavey Gallery, Wellington.

== Selected works ==
- Man and Window Reflection 1968 view
- Street Corner 1969 view
- Wind 1971 view
- Untitled 1975 view
- Untitled 1975 view
- Frog Green 1976 view
- Collections from a Japanese Garden 1937 1978 view
- Age of Fishes 1980 view
- Living for Today Number 3 1981 view
- Black Insects, Red Primitives 1981 view
- Chance and Inevitability 1982 view
- Measuring Tools 1994 view
- Book of the Hook 1996 view
- Jar of Pattern Sky 2001 view
- Loading 2004 view
