= Francis Pound =

New Zealand art historian, curator and writer

Francis Newport Pound (1948 – 15 October 2017) was a New Zealand art historian, curator and writer.

== Works ==
Pound's writings "challenged the writing of an earlier generation of art historians, including Hamish Keith, Gordon H. Brown and Peter Tomory, and championed abstract artists, especially Gordon Walters and Richard Killeen." Pound completed his doctorate on the work of Richard Killeen and lectured in art history at the University of Auckland. Pound's particular concern was nationalism and New Zealand art. His 1983 book Frames on the Land refuted earlier art historical arguments for a particular quality to New Zealand's light, which resulted in a bold, hard-edged approach to landscape painting in that country. Instead, he argued that visiting and immigrant artists in the 19th century brought established 'frames' with them, such as a sense of the land and a sublime and awesome force, through which they interpreted the New Zealand landscape.

His 1994 book The Space Between: Pakeha Use of Maori Motifs in Modernist New Zealand Art came in the wake of the 1992 exhibition Headlands: Thinking Through New Zealand Art, and discusses the cultural appropriation of Māori art and culture by modern Pākehā New Zealand artists, including Gordon Walters, Colin McCahon and Richard Killeen. Pound's final book summarises his thinking on 1930s artists, writers and thinkers who used art, literature and theory to posit a new sense of New Zealand identity through high culture, and how from the 1970s this framework was dismantled.

Pound’s book on the artist Gordon Walters was published posthumously in 2023. In it Pound covers all aspects of Walters life and work including the painting of his first large scale koru work Te Whiti first shown in 1966. The book was assisted into publication by Leonard Bell who also contributed a forward and afterword to the book.

=== Publications ===
Books by Francis Pound include:

- Frames on the Land : Early Landscape Painting in New Zealand, Auckland: Collins, 1983. ISBN 0002165988
- Forty modern New Zealand paintings Auckland: Penguin Books, 1985. ISBN 0140082468
- Voyage, Auckland: Workshop Press, 1991. ISBN 0959798145
- Signatures of place : paintings & place-names, New Plymouth: Govett-Brewster Art Gallery, 1991. ISBN 0908848064
- The space between : Pakeha use of Maori motifs in modernist New Zealand art, Auckland: Workshop Press, 1994. ISBN 0958331243
- Stories we tell ourselves : the paintings of Richard Killeen, Auckland: Auckland Art Gallery and David Bateman, 1999. ISBN 186953431X
- Walters : en abyme, Auckland: Gus Fisher Gallery, 2004. ISBN 0476006201
- The invention of New Zealand : art & national identity, 1930-1970, Auckland: Auckland University Press, 2009. ISBN 9781869404147
- Gordon Walters, Auckland University Press 2023. ISBN 9781869409531
