= Gretchen Albrecht =

New Zealand painter and sculptor (born 1943)

Gretchen Albrecht CNZM
- Born: 7 May 1943 (age 82); Onehunga, New Zealand
- Education: Elam School of Fine Arts
- Known for: Painting
- Movement: Color Field
- Website: Official website

Gretchen Albrecht CNZM (born 7 May 1943) is a New Zealand painter and sculptor.

== Early life and education ==
Albrecht was born in Onehunga in 1943, the daughter of Reuben John and Joyce Winifred Fairburn (née Grainger) Albrecht. She attended Mount Roskill Grammar School and the University of Auckland Elam School of Fine Arts, graduating in 1963 with an honours degree in painting.

== Career ==
=== Art school and early work ===
Albrecht's early work, during art school and the years immediately following, was figurative: 'the protagonist always a woman, and the woman was often nude'. Albrecht's work in the 1960s was also more autobiographical than any later painting. In the early 1970s Albrecht turned away from the human form and began looking at the landscape, her garden, and arranging natural objects on coloured backgrounds. From 1970 she also began to use thinned acrylic rather than oil on canvas, which allowed her to paint more freely, and unprimed canvases that allowed the pigment to soak into the raw fabric, mimicking the watercolour work she enjoyed.

=== 1970s ===
During the 1970s Albrecht's work became more and more abstracted, although it often still began with observations of the landscape, making studies in places like Auckland's West Coast and Manukau Harbour. Art historian Linda Gill notes that as Albrecht's paintings became more abstracted, her titles – originally prosaic, such as Table-Cloth with Curtain – became 'as poetic as her use of colour: Grey Ledge, Winged Spill, Storm Swell, Fritillary, Cushioned Fall, Penumbra.' An exhibition of American painter Morris Louis' large abstract acrylic paintings at the Auckland Art Gallery in 1971 encouraged Albrecht's commitment to her abstract style and encouraged her to be more bold.

=== 1980s and onwards: mature style ===
In 1980, after a year spent travelling in Europe and the United States, Albrecht produced works that directly referenced European painters and the history of art rather than her surroundings, with titles such as After Piero, Giotto's Blue and Lunette (for Fra Angelico). Her mature style appeared at this time, with her distinctive use of the lunette, which she calls Hemispheres, ovaloid canvases, what she calls Ovals, or oval motifs on standard rectangle canvases, which she calls Roses in the Snow. Albrecht first worked in the hemisphere form while living in Dunedin in 1981 as the Frances Hodgkins Fellow at the University of Otago: the artists has said 'I knew I wanted the hemisphere in 1981. I went to Dunedin with quadrants, the hemisphere happened in the studio, I put the quadrants together. I wanted to break out of the rectangle and the square, and to introduce a curve.' In 1992 Albrecht described the importance of the curved form in her work, describing it as having 'a sensuousness and a female-relatedness that I can't describe in any other way. It had a generosity about it that the angular stretcher didn't have'.

For a 1985 solo project at Auckland City Art Gallery, Albrecht made four works referring to the seasons. In an interview with art historian Anne Kirker noted that she conceived the exhibition as 'taking a room with four rooms and putting one work on each of them. So you're in an environment, moving from the door to around the room, looking at the work and out the same door again.' In the same article Albrecht noted that she worked with the hemisphere form for most of the 1980s but series of collages made in 1987 and exhibited in 1988 showed the 'disintegration' of this form and the introduction of new forms, specifically the oval.

She has been compared to Mark Rothko and particularly Helen Frankenthaler and other abstract expressionist artists. Albrecht has also expanded her work into oval metal sculpture since the early 2000s.

Albrecht received grants from the QE II Arts foundation in 1976, 1978 and 1986, and travelled and worked extensively in the United States. In 1981, Albrecht was awarded the Frances Hodgkins Fellowship at the University of Otago. Today, Albrecht splits her time between Auckland and London.

== Major exhibitions ==
- 1964 Contemporary New Zealand Painting, Auckland City Art Gallery
- 1965 New Zealand Painting 1965, Auckland City Art Gallery
- 1969 10 Years of New Zealand Painting, Auckland City Art Gallery
- 1975 New Zealand's Women Painters, Auckland City Art Gallery
- 1982 Seven Painters/The Eighties, Sarjeant Gallery, Wanganui
- 1985 Artist in Focus, Dowse Art Gallery, Lower Hutt
- 1985 Seasonal, artist project at Auckland City Art Gallery
- 1986 AFTERnature: Gretchen Albrecht: A Survey – 23 Years], Sarjeant Gallery, Wanganui; National Art Gallery Wellington
- 1991 Cross-Currents, Waikato Museum of Art and History, Hamilton
- 1991 Signature of Place, Govett-Brewster Art Gallery, New Plymouth
- 1992 Distance Looks Our Way – 10 Artists from New Zealand, EXPO (@ Seville; toured to Leiden, Madrid, Zamora, BArcelona, Auckland Art Gallery, City Gallery Wellington, Manawatu Art Gallery
- 1998 Dream Collectors, Museum of New Zealand Te Papa Tongarewa
- 1998 Leap of Faith, Govett-Brewster Art Gallery, New Plymouth
- 1999 Crossing the divide: a painter makes prints, Sarjeant Gallery, Wanganui
- 2001 Prospect 2001, City Gallery Wellington
- 2002 Gretchen Albrecht: Illuminations, Auckland Art Gallery
- 2005–2006 Gretchen Albrecht: Returning, Dunedin Public Art Gallery and City Gallery Wellington
- 2011 Gretchen Albrecht & Eve Armstrong, Making Arrangements, Michal Lett, Auckland
- 2012 Gretchen Albrecht: A Luminous Shade, Tauranga Art Gallery
- 2015 Colloquy, Two Rooms, Auckland
- 2016 Gretchen Albrecht: On Copper, Two Rooms, Auckland
- 2018 I come out of surgery looking golden, Two Rooms, Auckland

== Major publications ==
- James Ross (ed), AFTERnature: Gretchen Albrecht: A Survey – 23 Years, Wanganui: Sarjeant Gallery, 1986
- Linda Gill, Gretchen Albrecht, Auckland: Random Century New Zealand, 1991
- Ron Brownson (ed),Gretchen Albrecht: Illuminations, Auckland: Auckland Art Gallery and Godwit Press, 2002
- Michelle Leggott and Gretchen Albrecht, Journey to Portugal, Auckland: Holloway Press, 2006
- James Ross and Gretchen Albrecht, Gretchen Albrecht: between paint and nature: five decades, Arrowtown: Nadene Milne Gallery, 2009
- Edward Hanfling and James Ross, Gretchen Albrecht: A luminous shade, Auckland: Globe Editions, 2012

== Awards and recognitions ==
Albrecht was appointed a Companion of the New Zealand Order of Merit, for services to painting, in the 2000 Queen's Birthday Honours.

In 2007 Albrecht received a donation from the Arts Foundation of New Zealand Award for Patronage recipient Jenny Gibbs.

== Collections ==
Albrecht's work is held in all major New Zealand public gallery collections, including the Auckland Art Gallery, the University of Auckland, Victoria University of Wellington, Sarjeant Gallery, Waikato Museum, and the Museum of New Zealand Te Papa Tongarewa.
