= Jeffrey Harris (artist) =

New Zealand artist (1949)

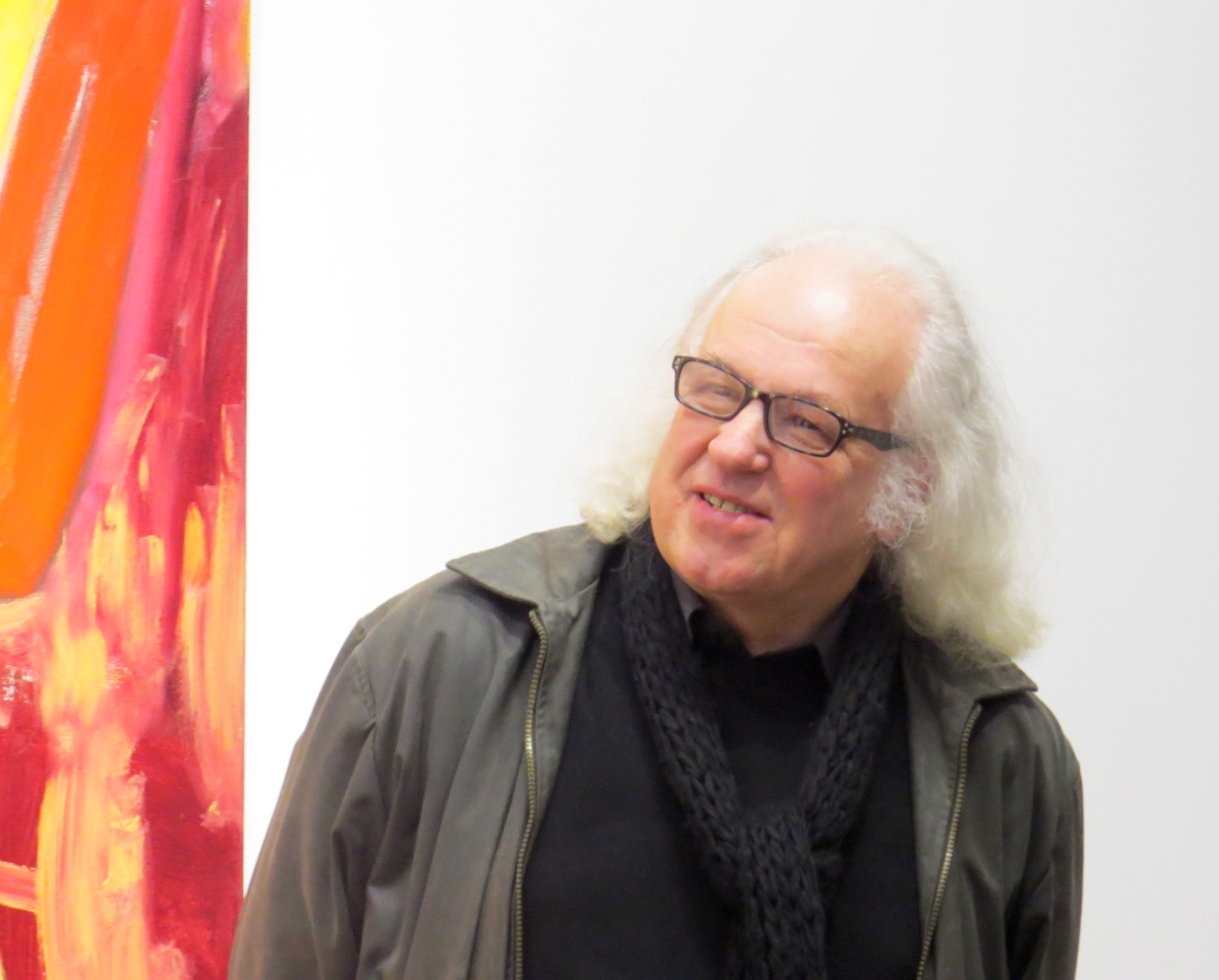
- Jeffrey Harris at the opening of an exhibition in Dunedin, 24 July 2020
- Born: 1949 (age 76–77); Akaroa, New Zealand
- Occupation: Artist

Jeffrey Harris (born Akaroa, 1949) is a New Zealand artist. (Note: note there is another artist with the same name: Jeffrey Harris born Leeds, UK, 1932)) Harris started his career in Christchurch, moving to Dunedin, New Zealand in 1969. In the early 1980s he worked briefly in the United States, before moving to Melbourne, Australia in 1986. In 2000 he returned to Dunedin, where he still lives. Largely self-taught, but mentored by notable New Zealand artists such as Michael Smither and Ralph Hotere, he has painted full-time since 1970.

== Early life ==
Harris was born in Akaroa and grew up on Banks Peninsula on his parents' farm. He attended high school in Rangiora, then worked in Christchurch for three years. He went to Dunedin so he could learn from Michael Smither, with whom he stayed for a year. He never went to art school but was influenced by artists such as Francis Bacon and his Crucifixions; his primary early inspiration came from art books.

== Style ==
Jeffery Harris in his Dunedin studio, March 2021

Harris's works are mainly large expressionistic canvases depicting family groups in daily situations. These works, based to a large extent on the artist's own life, often have strong symbolic meanings for the artist. From the mid-1980s until the turn of the century, Harris began producing powerful monochromatic abstracts – these works coincided with the period when Harris was working in Australia. Since his return to Dunedin, Harris's work has turned back to his earlier figurative styles, though often concentrating more on religious iconography such as the Crucifixion rather than domestic scenes.

== Selected solo exhibitions ==
- 1969 Paintings on Paper Otago Museum Foyer, Dunedin. Harris’s first public solo exhibition.
- 1972 Jeffrey Harris Canterbury Society of Arts, Mare Gallery. Harris exhibited 160 paintings.
- 1978 Jeffrey Harris: Paintings 1969-78 (toured) Manawatu Art Gallery, Palmerston North.
- 1981 Jeffrey Harris Dunedin Public Art Gallery .
- 1984 Jeffrey Harris: New Paintings, Artist’s Project No9 Auckland City Art Gallery .
- 1993 Jeffrey Harris: Recent Paintings Centre for Contemporary Art Hamilton.
- 2005 Jeffrey Harris Dunedin Public Art Gallery. (toured) Curated by Justin Paton who described Harris’s career as, ‘full of disappearances and returns, reversals and disavowals, perplexing silences and sudden intensities.’
- 2016 Jeffrey Harris: Renaissance Days Dunedin Public Art Gallery. Curator Lucy Hammonds commented that the ‘cinematic quality’ of the paintings had the effect of putting Harris’s paintings into the ‘world of fiction’ enabling viewers to start seeing it in a way that was not dominated by the ‘biographical reading’ that has typified writing on the artist.
- 2020 Jeffrey Harris: Within the Tides The Art House Trust.

== Selected group exhibitions ==
- 1971 Young Contemporaries (toured) Auckland City Art Gallery. The preliminary list of artists for the exhibition was done by Colin McCahon with director Gil Docking making the final selection of 38 painters and 12 sculptors.
- 1982 Carnegie International 1982, Museum of Art, Carnegie Institute, Pittsburgh.
- 1984 Anxious Images: Aspects of New Zealand Art Auckland City Art Gallery. Curator Alexa M. Johnston comments in her essay that in Harris’s work,’we are aware of his determination to convey an intensity of experience, to create images which stay in our minds and which can clarify and enlarge our awareness.’ The exhibition toured New Zealand.
- 1992 Headland’s: Thinking Through New Zealand Art Museum of Contemporary Art, Sydney. The exhibition was shown in Australia and the National Art Gallery in Wellington New Zealand.
- 2003 Self and Other: the Expressionist Spirit in New Zealand, Auckland Art Gallery.

== Selected works ==
- People in the Garden 1970 view
- Self Portrait 1970 view
- Homage to Van Gogh XV 1974 view
- Another Time 1975 view
- Grandparents at Okains 1976 view
- Untitled (Judith) No4 1978-1979 view
- This Sweet Sickeness 1984 view
- 28 Diptych 1987 view
- Untitled 1991 view
- Head With Cross (Self Portrait) 1998-2003 view
- From Dream #2939 2002-2003 view

== Honours and awards ==
In 1973 Harris was awarded a Queen Elizabeth II Visual Arts Grant in 1973 and three years later became the University of Otago's 1977 Frances Hodgkins Fellow.

In 1985 he was awarded a six month residency at Victoria College, Melbourne.

2003 Harris won the James Wallace Art Award that included a one-year residency in New York.

A book on Harris's art by Justin Paton (simply titled Jeffrey Harris) became a finalist in the 2006 Montana New Zealand Book Awards. Alongside the book, a major retrospective exhibition toured five of New Zealand's major public galleries from 2004 to 2006.
