= Don Driver =

New Zealand artist

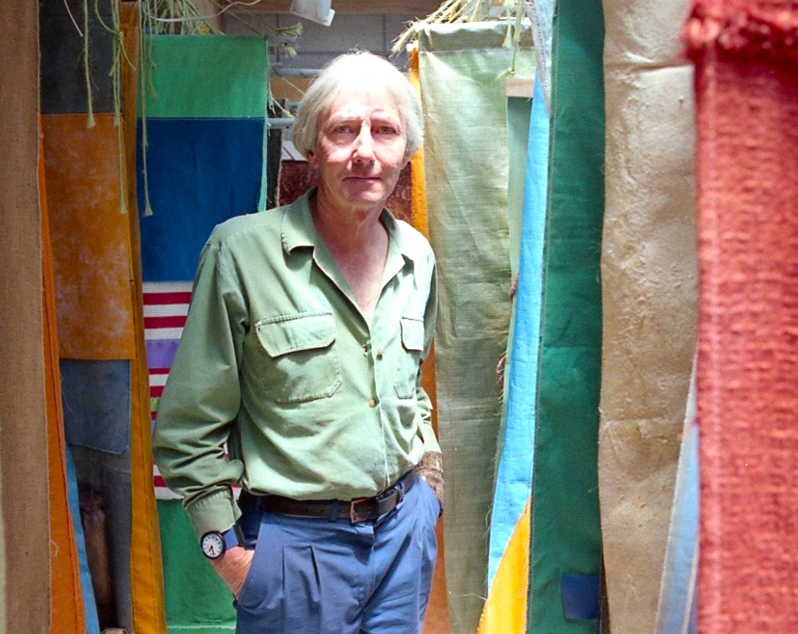
Don Driver in his New Plymouth studio, 1990

Donald Sinclair Driver (1930–2011) was a New Zealand artist born in Hastings. Driver was self-taught and worked in a variety of media including painting, sculpture, collage and assemblage. His work was often recognized for its use of everyday or vernacular materials.

Driver is associated with New Plymouth, having moved there with his family in 1944. He was educated at New Plymouth Boys’ High School and worked as a dental technician during the 1940s and 1950s before a lengthy period working at the Govett-Brewster Art Gallery (1969 to 1992). His 1966 mural commemorating the 1933 trans-Tasman flight of Charles Kingsford-Smith featured at New Plymouth airport from 1967 to 2019. Driver's sculpture Cats was installed in New Plymouth's Pukekura Park during the 1960s. In 2013 a replica of the work was installed in its place.

Driver's work often attracted controversy. In 1967 his sculpture Magician was removed from the New Plymouth public library one of the library committee complaining that, "the real trouble with the work is that it could not be ignored."` In 1981 the National Art Gallery in Wellington commissioned Driver to produce an installation. The resulting work, Ritual (1982), consists of ten 44-gallon drums topped by children's dolls with goat-skull heads holding pitchforks, all mounted on a cart. The work attracted criticism for its bad taste and embrace of the occult. In 1983 following its own display of the work, the Govett-Brewster Art Gallery in New Plymouth tried to acquire Ritual for its collection. The acquisition proposal met stern opposition from civic council politicians who objected to the offensive nature of the work and ultimately failed. Ritual was subsequently acquired in 1989 by the National Art Gallery (now the Museum of New Zealand Te Papa Tongarewa). At the time National Art Gallery curator Robert Leonard described Ritual as "one of the most controversial and despised works of New Zealand art history".

In 2013 filmmakers Paul Judge and Bridget Sutherland produced the documentary Don Driver: Magician.

== Selected works ==
- Large Brass 1966 view
- Flyaway 1966-1969 view
- Own Drum 1967 view
- Horizontal Relief 1973 view
- Blue and Green Pacific 1978 view
- Yellow Tentacle Pram 1980 view
- Produce 1982 view
- Ritual 1982 view
- Yellow Skin 9 1984 view
- Screen 1985 view
- Duraband 3 (Blue tarpaulin with Green Tape and Some Yellow and Blue) 1986 view

== Collections ==
Don Driver's work is held in public collections throughout New Zealand.

- Museum of New Zealand Te Papa Tongarewa, Wellington
- Govett-Brewster Art Gallery, New Plymouth
- Auckland Art Gallery
- Sarjeant Gallery, Whanganui
- Dunedin Public Art Gallery

== Solo exhibitions ==
- 1999 With Spirit: Don Driver a retrospective 1965 - 1998, Govett-Brewster Art Gallery, New Plymouth
- 1997 Driver Works from the Barr Collection, Dunedin Public Art Gallery
- 1996 Circular Planes, Loppdell House Gallery, Auckland
- 1994 Sculpture, Hangings and Collage, Dick Bett Gallery, Hobart
- 1993 Don Driver in the Round, Sarjeant Gallery, Whanganui
- 1993 From the Last Ten Years, Dowse Art Museum, Lower Hutt
- 1988 Boxes, Wellington City Art Gallery
- 1988 Fifteen Years, Centre for Contemporary Art, Hamilton
- 1987 New Collages, Taranaki Museum, New Plymouth
- 1986 Driver: Works from the National Collection, National Art Gallery, Wellington
- 1979 Don Driver: 1965-1978, Govett-Brewster Art Gallery, New Plymouth
- 1977 Don Driver: 1971-1977, Govett-Brewster Art Gallery, New Plymouth

== Group exhibitions ==
- 2013 The Obstinate Object, City Gallery Wellington
- 1997 Sharp & Shiny, Govett-Brewster Art Gallery, New Plymouth
- 1987 When Art Hits the Headlines, National Art Gallery, Wellington
- 1983 Installation Art, Govett-Brewster Art Gallery, New Plymouth
- 1978 Mildura Sculpture Triennial, Mildura, Victoria
- 1971 Ten Big Paintings, Auckland City Art Gallery
- 1969 International Biennial, Tokyo
- 1951 Rutland Group, Auckland City Art Gallery
