= Milan Mrkusich =

New Zealand artist and designer

Milan Mrkusich ONZM (5 April 1925 – 13 June 2018) was a New Zealand artist and designer. He was considered a pioneer of abstract painting in New Zealand. Retrospective exhibitions of his work were organised by the Auckland Art Gallery in 1972 and 1985, and at the Gus Fisher Gallery in 2009. A substantial monograph was published by Auckland University Press in 2009.

Mrkusich was appointed an Officer of the New Zealand Order of Merit, for services to painting, in the 1997 Queen's Birthday Honours, and was one of ten inaugural Icon Award recipients from the Arts Foundation of New Zealand in 2003.

== Education ==
Milan Mrkusich was born in Dargaville to emigrant Croatian parents from a village of Podgora in the Dalmatia region of Croatia. The family moved to Auckland in 1927, and Milan attended St Joseph's Convent (Parnell), Marist Brothers School (Ponsonby), and Sacred Heart College.

In 1942 he took an apprenticeship in Writing and Pictorial Arts at Neuline Studios and attended the Seddon Memorial Technical College (now Auckland University of Technology) commercial art course.

== Architecture and design ==
Influenced by the Bauhaus movement, it is probably no coincidence that Mrkusich's first solo exhibition was held at The University of Auckland's School of Architecture in 1949.

Mrkusich was heavily involved in the work of Brenner Associates. Formed in 1949, Brenner Associates comprised architects Stephen Jelicich, Desmond Mullen and Vladimir Čačala, working with Mrkusich and designer John Butterworth. Aside from architectural work, Brenner offered integrated interior, exhibition, lighting and furniture design, for which Mrkusich contributed interior and furniture design, as well as designing and building his own (award-winning) home (1950).

Mrkusich was also responsible for the design of several murals, mosaics and stained glass windows, including the windows of St Joseph's Catholic Church, Grey Lynn, Auckland (1958–60) and the B.J. Ball Paper mural in Graham Street, Downtown Auckland.

== Developing abstraction ==
In the 1970s, with fellow pioneer of New Zealand abstraction, Gordon Walters, Mrkusich exhibited at the Petar/James Gallery, run from 1972-76 by outspoken art dealer brothers Petar and James Vuletic. Like American critic Clement Greenberg, Vuletic had strong views on modernism and championed a group of like-minded artists, he had purchased works by Mrkusich and Walters in 1968. Other artists in the Vuletic circle include Stephen Bambury, Richard Killeen, and Ian Scott.

== Career ==
The Auckland Art Gallery gave him a survey exhibition in 1972, and another in 1985. A further retrospective was held at the Gus Fisher Gallery in 2009, touring to City Gallery Wellington in 2010.

His work is held in most significant public collections in New Zealand including Museum of New Zealand Te Papa Tongarewa, Auckland Art Gallery, Christchurch Art Gallery, Govett-Brewster Art Gallery, Sarjeant Gallery, Dunedin Public Art Gallery and The University of Auckland.
