= Michael Dunn (art historian) =

New Zealand art historian (born 1942)

- Born: 1942 (age 83–84); Ashburton, New Zealand
- Education: Canterbury School of Fine Arts; University of Canterbury; University of Melbourne; University of Auckland
- Occupations: Art historian, writer, lecturer

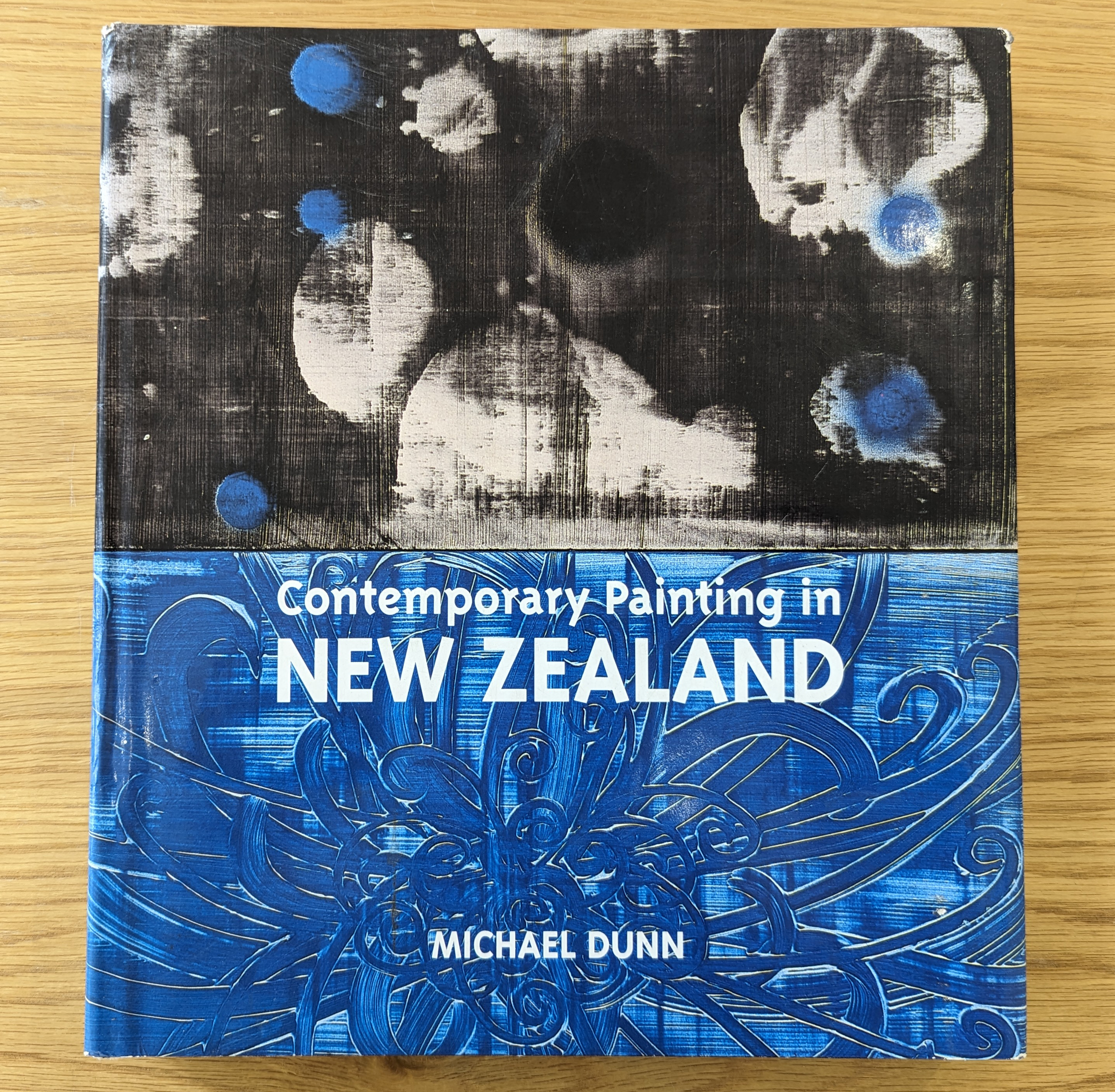
Contemporary Painting in New Zealand (1996) by Michael Dunn, featuring Blatant Cosmos (1993) by Luise Fong on the cover.

Michael Dunn (born 1942) is a New Zealand art historian.

Dunn was born in Ashburton in Mid Canterbury, and attended Canterbury School of Fine Arts (Ilam), graduating with a degree in painting.He was awarded the Painting Prize in 1963. He was awarded an Arts Council Scholarship to study Art History in 1965. He continued his studies at the University of Melbourne where he graduated with First class Honours, and University of Auckland, where he received a PhD in Art History in 1985 for his thesis on Gordon Walters. Dunn collaborated with Theo Schoon on multiple publications on Maori rock art.

Dunn taught Art History at Auckland University from 1970 until 1993, becoming Head of the university's Art History Department. He was appointed Head and Dean of the university's Elam School of Fine Arts in 1994. He retired in 2006, at which point he was given the title of Emeritus Professor of Fine Arts.

Dunn has written or co-written many books and monographs, predominantly on New Zealand art and in particular the artist Gordon Walters and his koru series of paintings initiated by the work Te Whiti in 1966. An archive of his writing and related papers is held by the Auckland Art Gallery.

== Bibliography ==
- Maori Rock Art (1972, A. H. & A. W. Reed)
- Gordon Walters (1983, Auckland City Art Gallery)
- A Concise History of New Zealand Painting (1991, STBS)
- Contemporary Painting in New Zealand (1996, Gordon & Breach)
- John Kinder Paintings and Photographs (1985) Seto, Auckland
- New Zealand Sculpture: A History (2002, Auckland University Press)
  - New Zealand Sculpture: A History Updated (revised edition, 2008)
- Frances Hodgkins: Paintings and Drawings (with Elizabeth Eastmond and Iain Buchanan; 2002, Auckland University Press)
- New Zealand Painting: A Concise History (2003, Auckland University Press)
- Nerli: An Italian Painter in the South Pacific (2005, Auckland University Press)
- Two Hundred and Forty Years of New Zealand Painting (with Gil Docking and Edward Hanfling; 2010, David Bateman)
