= Gordon Walters =

New Zealand artist (1919–1995)

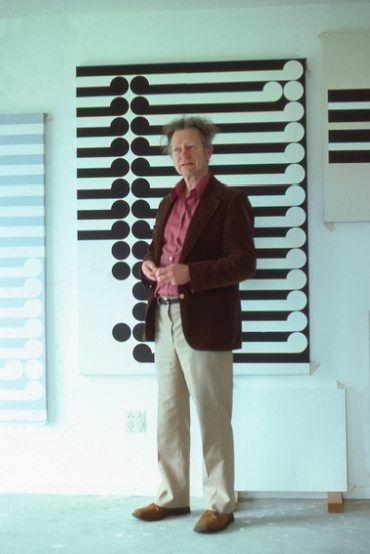
- Gordon Walters in his Christchurch studio, 1978
- Born: 24 September 1919; Wellington, New Zealand
- Died: 5 November 1995 (aged 76); Christchurch, New Zealand
- Style: Modern abstract
- Spouse: Margaret Orbell

Gordon Frederick Walters (24 September 1919 – 5 November 1995) was a Wellington-born artist and graphic designer who is significant to New Zealand culture due to his representation of New Zealand in his Modern Abstract artworks.

== Education ==
Gordon Walters was born and raised in Wellington, where he went to Miramar South School and Rongotai College. From 1935 to 1939 he studied as a commercial artist at Wellington Technical College under Frederick V. Ellis.

== Early influence and experiences ==
Walters applied to join the army during World War II but was turned down due to medical problems. He took up a job in the Ministry of Supply doing illustrations. Walters traveled to Australia in 1946 and then visited photographer and painter Theo Schoon in South Canterbury, who was photographing Māori rock art at Ōpihi River. This visit was central to Walters work as he began using Māori cultural themes in his painting. In 1950 Walters moved to Europe where he became influenced by Piet Mondrian, Victor Vasarely and Auguste Herbin. On his return to New Zealand in 1953, Walters began to fuse abstract modernism with traditional Māori art.

== The koru series ==
In the early fifties Walters' designs progressed and New Zealand shapes and ideas, in particular the Māori koru form, became important themes. His design straightened the stem of the koru in a way not seen in customary Māori contexts. Walters stated "My work is an investigation of positive/ negative relationships within a deliberately limited range of forms; the forms I use have no descriptive value in themselves and are used solely to demonstrate relations. I believe that dynamic relations are most clearly expressed by the repetition of a few simple elements."

=== Te Whiti ===
In 1956 Walters made the initial studies for the painting that would become his first koru painting, Te Whiti. As art historian Michael Dunn noted, 'Perfecting that motif took some eight years of dedicated labour.' In 1964 Walters made the first large scale (1220 x 915mm) koru painting that has survived. It was titled after the Māori spiritual leader Te Whiti-o-Rongomai (Te Āti Awa) and may also reference Te Whiti Street in Kilbirnie Wellington where Walters lived as a child. Some critics have found this possible personal reference to be at odds with Walters' insistence on the works being seen as purely abstract. For Te Whiti Walters used hardboard and a co polymer of PVA. Now known as acrylic, this material was relatively new at the time. Although available for house painting in New Zealand as early as 1952, there is no public record of its use by artists until 1962.

Te Whiti was not included in the New Vision Gallery exhibition Gordon Walters: Painting 1965 and Walters submitted it instead to the Hays Ltd Art Competition as Painting 1965. Since the return of the work from the Hays Competition the painting has been known as Te Whiti and it is this title that is inscribed on the back of the painting along with the year 1964 and the artist's name.

Te Whiti has been owned privately since 1966 and has been exhibited on only a few occasions. A year after the Hays Competition it was shown in Wellington as Te Whiti in the exhibition Abstract Paintings by Forty New Zealand Artists, Wellington Art Club, New Zealand Display Centre, Wellington. At that stage it was owned by Ralph S. Von Kohorn. In 1983 Te Whiti was included in Gordon Walters Auckland City Art Gallery (now known as Auckland Art Gallery / Toi o Tāmaki). The City Gallery Wellington included the painting in the 2001 Parihaka: the Art of Resistance. It was last exhibited publicly in 2017 in Gordon Walters: New Vision, Dunedin Public Art Gallery and Auckland Art Gallery Toi o Tāmaki.

In 2023 the Walters Estate published an edition of 100 screen prints of Te Whiti embossed with the Estate's blind stamp. In the same year, to coincide with the publication of Francis Pound's book Gordon Walters, Glorious Digital produced a digital version of Te Whiti in an edition of 100. The package included the digital reproduction of the work, Francis Pound's book (a detail from Te Whiti features on the cover) and a small, printed version of the painting.

=== Maheno ===
Walters' best known work, Maheno, was painted in 1981 and is also part of Walters ongoing koru series. Like Te Whiti the painting brings both Māori and European ideas together through geometric abstraction and Māori culture expressed through both image and language with the koru and the title 'Maheno' in Māori. Koru is a Māori word that has now become part of mainstream New Zealand English, describing the growing tip of a fern frond.

== Selected exhibitions ==
=== Solo ===
- 1941 Gordon Walters French Maid Coffee House, Wellington. Walters had three exhibitions (41, 44, and 47) at the French Maid Coffee House and in 1947 designed the café's menu.
- 1949 Gordon Walters Wellington Public Library. One of the few venues for serious artists at the time the Library had shown an exhibition of Colin McCahon the previous year.
- 1965 Gordon Walters: Painting 1965, New Vision Gallery, Auckland. The first major exhibition of Water's koru based paintings.
- 1969 Gordon Walters: Paintings Peter McLeavey Gallery. This was the McLeavey gallery's sixth exhibition and one of 12 the artist would have with the Wellington art dealer in his life-time. Wellington.
- 1983 Gordon Walters: A Retrospective Exhibition, Auckland Art Gallery.
- 1994 Parallel Lines: Gordon Walters in Context. Auckland Art Gallery.
- 2004 Walters en Abyme Gus Fisher Gallery, University of Auckland. Focussing on Water's abstract work, en abyme means abyss, the exhibition was curated by Dr. Francis Pound.
- 2004 Gordon Walters: Prints and Design (toured). Te Pātaka Toi Adam Art Gallery, Wellington. The first time all of Walters prints were shown together along with preparatory studies and examples of his commercial graphic art work.
- 2014 Gordon Walters Koru (tour) Te Papa Togarewa The Museum of New Zealand, Wellington.
- 2017 Gordon Walters: New Vision. Auckland Art Gallery Toi o Tāmaki and Dunedin Public Art Gallery. Curated by Lucy Hammonds, Laurence Simmons and Julia Waite.
- 2018 Gordon Walters: Photographs. Gus Fisher Gallery, University of Auckland.

=== Group ===
- 1931 New Zealand Academy of Fine Arts.
- 1966 New Zealand Painting 1966. Walters exhibited two of his koru works, Painting Number 1 and Painting Number 2.
- 1967 Manawatu Prize for Contemporary Art 1967. Walters with his painting Grafton shared the prize with Milan MrKusich.
- 1968 Ten Years of New Zealand Painting Auckland City Art Gallery.
- 1970 New Zealand Art of the Sixties: A Royal Visit Exhibition (toured). Queen Elizabeth II Arts Council.
- 1976 New Zealand Drawing 1976 Auckland City Art Gallery.
- 1983 Aspects of New Zealand Art: The Grid, Lattice and Network. Auckland City Art Gallery.
- 1986 Content / Context: A Survey of Recent New Zealand Art (part one). National Art Gallery Wellington.
- 1990 Now See Hear!:Art, Language and Translation. City Gallery, Wellington.
- 1992 Headlands: Thinking Through New Zealand Art (toured). Museum of Contemporary Art, Sydney.
- 1995 Stop Making Sense. City Gallery Wellington. Pākehā and European artists were asked to work together on an artwork. Walters collaborated with Chris Heaphy.
- 1997 Hattaway Schoon Walters. Lopdell House, Auckland.
- 1999 Home and Away: Contemporary Australian and New Zealand Art from the Chartwell Collection (toured). Auckland Art Gallery Toi o Tāmaki.
- 2000 Parehaka: The Art of Passive Resistance. City Gallery Te Whare Toi Wellington. The exhibition included the painting Te Whiti Walter's first large scale koru painting.
- 2003 Vuletic and His Circle. Gus Fisher Gallery, University of Auckland.
- 2011 Oceania: Imagining the Pacific. A collaborative exhibition between the City Gallery, Wellington and the Museum of New Zealand Te Papa Tongarewa.

== Selected works ==
- Chrysanthemum (1944)
- The Poet (1947)
- Untitled (1952)
- Untitled (1955)
- Untitled (1957)
- Painting Number 1 (1965)
- Hautana (1970)
- Genealogy 5 (1971)
- Tama (1977)
- Untitled (1992)

== Controversy ==
From the mid-1980s, Walters was accused of exploitative appropriation of Māori art by several critics, both Māori and Pākehā (European New Zealander). The discussion around Walters' appropriation of Maori forms surfaced again in the early nineties when his work was included in the exhibition Headlands: Thinking Through New Zealand Art in 1992.

== Personal life ==
Walters became a full-time artist in 1966 and in 1971 was awarded a QEII Fellowship. Recognised for his precise geometric abstraction, he moved to Christchurch in 1976.

Walters married Margaret Orbell (1934–2006), a scholar of Māori literature, in 1963.

Gordon Walters died in Christchurch on 5 November 1995, aged 76.
