= William McAloon =

New Zealand art historian (1969–2012)

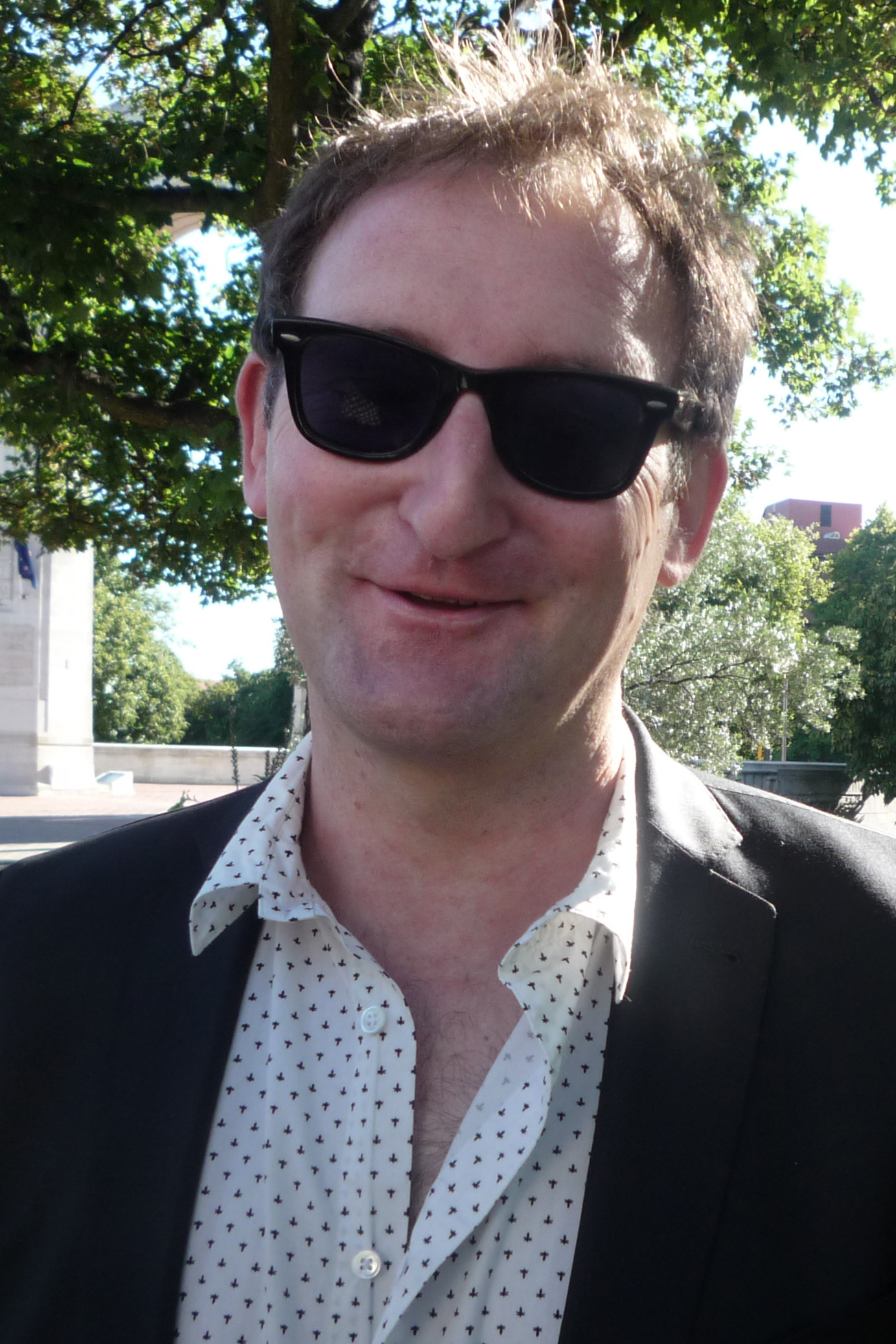
- McAloon in 2011
- Born: 9 August 1969; Christchurch, New Zealand
- Died: 8 April 2012 (aged 42)
- Education: University of Canterbury
- Occupations: Art curator; art critic; writer
- Known for: Exhibition curation and art writing
- Spouse: Courtney Johnston

William McAloon (9 August 1969 – 8 April 2012) was a New Zealand art curator, art historian and writer.

== Early career ==
McAloon was born in 1969 in Christchurch to Anne and Peter McAloon. He attended Burnside High School and went on to graduate from the University of Canterbury where he also wrote regularly for the student newspaper CANTA. McAloon's career as an art writer and curator began in Christchurch in the 1990s when he was a regular reviewer for The Press newspaper and the Dominion Sunday Times. McAloon also began his practice as a curator at this time, developing a number of exhibitions. The first in a public venue was Vogue/Vague which presented sculpture at the CSA Gallery. McAloon said of this exhibition that he hoped to "open up questions about art and its place in the world". Critic Penny Orme noted that there was "much that will stimulate, challenge, annoy or appeal in this diverse and impressive exhibition".

== Art museum career ==
In 1993, McAloon was appointed trainee curator at the Dunedin Public Art Gallery and later that year moved to Auckland to take up the position of assistant curator and later curator of contemporary art at the Auckland Art Gallery where he worked for the next five years. One significant project was his work on the exhibition Korurangi: New Māori Art in 1995. McAloon’s role as organising curator was to work with the free-lance curator George Hubbard who had made the exhibition Choice! at Artspace in 1990. Hubbard initially insisted on the Auckland Art Gallery calling his exhibition Brownie Points, a title the gallery rejected. In spite of a complicated relationship with Hubbard, McAloon was finally satisfied that the exhibition successfully questioned ‘essentialist definitions’ of Māori art. Korurangi was well received by the public, although Hubbard was disappointed by the final exhibition being what he saw as a highly mediated version of his original idea. McAloon curated a number of important exhibitions while at the Auckland Art Gallery. A selection is listed in the exhibitions section below. He also worked closely with the Chartwell Collection which had been relocated from Hamilton to the Auckland Art Gallery in 1997. In the publication for Auckland’s first Chartwell exhibition Home and Away in 1999, McAloon presented a rare interview with the instigator of the collection Rob Gardiner. McAloon left the Auckland Art Gallery in 2000 and worked as an independent curator, writer and art critic for five years. Between 2000 and 2005 he was the art reviewer for the NZ Listener. In 2004 he was one of the selectors for the first Walters Prize alongside Robert Leonard, Anna Miles and Justin Paton. The panel selected Michael Stevenson, John Reynolds, Gavin Hipkins and Yvonne Todd as finalists for the Prize which was awarded to Todd. Although highly critical of early Te Papa exhibitions, McAloon was appointed curator of Historical New Zealand Art at Te Papa Tongarewa in 2005. He filled this role for the next seven years. While working at Te Papa McAloon married Courtney Johnston who at the time was working on the DigitalNZ project at the National Library. McAloon made a significant contribution to Te Papa’s publication programme. Of particular note are Rita Angus Life & Vision (2008) which he edited with Jill Trevelyan and the major book he edited about Te Papa’s collection Art at Te Papa (2009). The latter went on to win the non-fiction category of the Montana Book Awards. He remained Curator of Historical New Zealand Art at Te Papa until his death in 2012.

== Selected exhibitions ==
- 1990 Situation and Style Jonathan Jensen Gallery, Christchurch.
- 1992 Vogue/Vague (sculpture exhibition) CSA Gallery, Christchurch.
- 1994 Station to Station: The Way of the Cross Auckland City Art Gallery Toi o Tāmaki.
- 1994 Parallel Lines: Gordon Walters in Context Auckland Art Gallery Toi o Tāmaki.
- 1996 Milan Mrkusich: Six Journeys Auckland Art Gallery Toi o Tāmaki New Gallery.
- 1997 The Chartwell Collection: A Selection Auckland Art Gallery Toi o Tāmaki.
- 1997 White Out: Recent Works by Seven Artists Auckland Art Gallery Toi o Tāmaki contemporary space.
- 1997 Necessary correction: Colin McCahon, Stephen Bambury, Helmut Federle Auckland Art Gallery Toi o Tāmaki.
- 1999 Home and Away: Contemporary Australian and New Zealand Art from the Chartwell Collection Auckland Art Gallery Toi o Tāmaki.
- 1999 The Promised Land Suter Gallery Te Aratoi o Whakatū.
- 2001 Te Maunga Taranaki: Views of a Mountain, Govett-Brewster Art Gallery, New Plymouth. Curators Gregory Burke, William McAloon, Hanna Scott and Darcy Nicholas.
- 2004 Gordon Walters: Print + Design University of Victoria's Adam Art Gallery.
- 2005 Victoria University, a University Collection Adam Art Gallery.
- 2008 Rita Angus: Life & Vision Te Papa Tongarewa. Co-curated with Jill Trevelyan.

== Selected publications ==
- 1994 Parallel Lines: Gordon Walters in Context Auckland Art Gallery Toi o Tāmaki.
- 1997 Necessary Correction: Colin McCahon, Stephen Bambury, Helmut Federle (with Wystan Curnow) Auckland Art Gallery Toi o Tāmaki.
- 1999 Home and Away: Contemporary Australian and New Zealand Art from the Chartwell Collection Auckland Art Gallery Toi o Tāmaki.
- 2004 Gordon Walters: Prints + Design, University of Victoria's Adam Art Gallery Te Pataka Toi.
- 2008 Rita Angus: Life & Vision (with Jill Trevelyan) Te Papa Press.
- 2009 Art at Te Papa Te Papa Press .

== Selected critical writing ==
- 1992 Richard Reddaway: Stepping Out - A Body of Bodies.
- 1992 Real/Surreal Art Reviews.
- 1999 Invention Unlimited: With Spirit - Don Driver A Retrospective.
- 1999 Stirring the pot: Recent paintings by Shane Cotton.
- 2000 Sixty Strings Slowly Strummed.
- 2003-04 Model Worlds: A Decade of Work by Gavin Hipkins.
- 2003 Diane Arbus is Alive and Unwell, NZ Listener.
- 2005 Wild Boys.
- 2005 Bridget Riley: paintings and preparatory work 1961-2004.
