= Gavin Hipkins =

New Zealand photographer and filmmaker (born 1968)

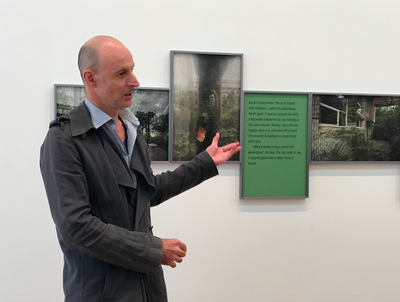
- Gavin Hipkins with his work at the Adam Art Gallery, 2017
- Born: 1968 (age 57–58); Auckland
- Education: 1992 Bachelor of Fine Arts, Elam School of Fine Arts University of Auckland and 2002 Master of Fine Arts at the University of British Columbia
- Known for: Photographic installations and films
- Notable work: The Homely

Gavin John Hipkins (born 1968 in Auckland) is a New Zealand photographer and filmmaker, and Associate Professor at Elam School of Fine Arts, at the University of Auckland.

== Education ==
Hipkins completed a Bachelor of Fine Arts at the University of Auckland in 1992 and a Master of Fine Arts at the University of British Columbia in 2002.

== Photography ==
Throughout his career, Hipkins has worked with both analogue and digital forms of photography. His work is often produced as either discrete multi-part works or, more rarely, in ongoing series.

=== Falls (1992–present) ===
Hipkins began working with the format he used for a number of works, collectively known as Falls, while he was still at art school. These works are made up of 'vertical strip[s] of machine prints, which present the content of a single roll of film—a session of almost identical shots of one subject from more or less the same angle, like a ‘shot' of film footage'. Zerfall Wellington 1 March 1996 (1996) is made up of images from a firework display. Falls, Zerfall (1997–1998), shown at the 1998 Biennale of Sydney, consisted of images of circular objects usually found in kitchens and bathrooms. A set of seven Falls, titled The Gulf, mixed images collected from pornography websites (each work was titled after a genre: Teen, Blonde, Mature, Asian, Latina, Ebony, and Red-headed) mixed with stereotypical imagery from travel advertising, photos of small accessories (buttons, ribbon) and neutral background textures.

=== Westwards (1993) ===
In this series, Hipkins used ready-made images, sourced from kitschy offset prints made in Switzerland in 1978, which he bought in West Auckland. He reproduced the images as large rectangular wallpaper murals (2160 x 4800 mm each).

=== New Age (1993–2003) ===
The New Age works are closely linked to the photographs in The Sanctuary series. Photographs of New Zealand's West Coast and other personally significant landscapes are overlaid with photograms of beads. The original photographs are sourced from Hipkins' own archive, using existing works that have rarely been printed.

=== The Field (1994–1995) ===
In The Field, 1,500 photograms produced by placing a polystyrene ball on a sheet of photographic paper and exposing it to light. The photograms were shown as a single massed grid on the gallery wall. The work was shown at Teststrip, an artist-run gallery in Auckland, and at the Dunedin Public Art Gallery.

=== The Trench (1997–1998) ===
In 1997, Hipkins visited Chandigarh in Northern India. The city contains many buildings by architect Le Corbusier, and his symbolic structure, the Open Hand Monument, a metal weather vane that rotates in the wind. The Trench is a slide show of 80 photographs taken of the monument, each one double-exposed with an image of a rose from Chandigarh's rose garden. As the images of the hand form rotate in the photographs, the roses move from red to orange to yellow.

=== The Homely (1997–2000) ===
The 80 c-type prints in The Homely were taken over a period of several years, on trips around New Zealand and Australia. In this work, Hipkins explored the idea of nationhood, and the signs and symbols used to express a sense of belonging to a place, especially, as he described it, 'in the turbulent wake of British Imperialism'. Each work is individually titled with a date, a named object, and a location, and the 80 works were hung alongside each other in a continuous display. In the publication accompanying the exhibition art historian Peter Brunt wrote:

The work requires its spectator to walk by it, so that the process of looking at it transpires in time. These dates and names are important. They specify individual sites but they also map the site specificity of the work as a whole. They are a kind of litany accompanying the viewer in his or her passage through the work.

Works from The Homely were shown in Flight Patterns, an exhibition curated by Connie Butler for the Los Angeles Museum of Contemporary Art. The Homely evolved into an exhibition initiated by City Gallery Wellington and shown at the Sarjeant Gallery and Dunedin Public Art Gallery. Hipkins was nominated in the inaugural Walters Prize for this work.

=== The Circuit (1999) ===
This site-specific work was created at the Dunedin Public Art Gallery. 2000 small c-type prints depicting strands of liquorice were laid like raceway circuits around three gallery walls, accompanied by one large photograph of a skeletal Indian sculpture, Eurasia, and a video work showing plates of milk being slowly dyed blue or red with jelly crystals. The installation was produced when Hipkins was in Dunedin as part of the gallery's Visiting Artist Programme.

=== The Habitat (1999–2000) ===
The Habitat is a series of 72 silver gelatin prints, hung in a single line as a frieze, that take late modern and Brutalist buildings in New Zealand university campuses as their subject. Hipkins photographed details of buildings' interiors and exteriors, and printed the resulting images on expired photo paper, producing images that were often blurred, under or over-exposed, too high or too low in contrast: the opposite of 'professional' architectural photographs. The Habitat was first shown at the Adam Art Gallery and Artspace in Auckland.

=== The Crib (c. 2000) ===
The Crib is a multi-part photogram work, originally displayed as a 20 metre-long frieze. As with numerous other works, such as The Field, the photograms are made by exposing sheets of photographic paper over with polystyrene balls have been laid.

=== The Colony (2000–2002) ===
This work, made up of 100 individual c-type prints of painted and glued-together hemispherical polystyrene blobs, was made for the 2002 Sao Paulo Biennale and then re-shown at the Gus Fisher Gallery in Auckland. Curator Robert Leonard wrote of this work:

Geometric yet organic, the blobs resemble at once alien pods, igloos, pup tents, breasts, the curvaceous hills and mud pools of his native New Zealand, and bacteria. The psychedelic colour scheme is both candied and toxic; we could be staring into a lava lamp, perhaps furthering a boudoir subtext. There's no reference for scale. The work could imply a macroscopic view (an imperialist invasion, a commune of hippie drop-outs in their geodesic domes, or a high-tech off-world encampment on a weirdly hued planet) or a microscopic one.

=== The Next Cabin (2000–2002) ===
While undertaking post-graduate study at the University of British Columbia, Hipkins decided he wanted 'one sustainable, heavyweight project' to focus on. The Next Cabin is a sequel of sorts to The Homely, made up of 40 c-type prints of photographs taken in the Pacific Northwest. The series is also influenced by the Cascadian independent movement, a hypothetical nation stretching from Southern British Columbia to Northern California.

=== The Stall (2001) ===
The Stall was made when Hipkins was artist in residence at the Waikato Museum of Art and History. made up of 95 c-type prints, the work uses the 'Fall' form and features imagery as diverse as buttons, car racing, and female faces and bodies.

=== The Sanctuary (2004–present) ===
The Sanctuary is a series of square-format unique silver gelatin prints. In them, Hipkins documents parks, gardens and zoos in cities in various countries (including Shanghai, Rotorua, London, Melbourne, New Plymouth and Hong Kong), often selecting details to focus on rather than following the traditional formats of landscape photography. These images are then superimposed with photograms of sinuous abstract shapes; lengths of ribbon, strands of beads, chain necklaces and threaded sequins.

Hipkins continued work on The Sanctuary during his time on an artist residency at the International Studio and Curatorial Program in New York in 2006.

=== Tender Buttons (2006) ===
The Tender Buttons works were developed when Hipkins was in New York on the International Studio and Curatorial Programme residency. In these works, images from artworks and objects in museum collections are overlaid with oversized scans of buttons sourced from New York's garment district, located near the residency hub. The title of the works alludes to Gertrude Stein's Tender Buttons.

A related work, the 12-piece The Terrace (2008) is held in the collection of the Museum of New Zealand Te Papa Tongarewa.

=== Empire (2007) and Second Empire (2008) ===
In Empire, Hipkins first used the method of taking scans he made of colour plates in books and then overlaying them with an embroidered patches and decals bought from markets and music stores. Hipkins selected his images from children's Commonwealth and Empire annuals from the 1950s. He worked on these series over the summer of 2007/2008 on his McCahon House residency, and showed Second Empire at the Lopdell House Gallery.

=== Bible Studies (New Testament) (2008) ===
The Bible Studies (New Testament) works were first shown at the Adam Art Gallery and then re-presented at Starkwhite Gallery in Auckland. Continuing the methods he used in Empire and Second Empire, the large-format c-type prints each feature a detail of an image appropriated from a 1968 illustrated children's bible, overlaid with an embroidered patch bearing a two or three-word phrase from Goethe's play Faust.

=== Collaboration with Karl Fritsch (2012–present) ===
Hipkins met jeweller Karl Fritsch when the two artists had concurrent exhibitions at Wellington dealer gallery Hamish McKay Gallery. Fritsch frequently collaborates with other artists, but this is Hipkins' first collaboration. Hipkins selects narrative black and white photographs from his archive, which Fritsch then applies metal and gem stones to, puncturing, filing back and variously altering the surfaces of the works. Their collaborative works have been presented in several dealer gallery exhibitions and in Multiple Exposures: Jewelry and Photography at the Museum of Arts and Design.

=== Leisure Valley and The Port (2014) ===
In 2013, Hipkins returned to Chandigarh to photograph and film for two works: Leisure Valley (a 46-part photo-installation) and The Port, a short film. The 46 photos in Leisure Valley reflect the 46 sectors in Le Corbusier's original plan for Chandigarh; The Port combines images of the 18th century architectural instruments Jantar Mantars with imagery drawn from the New Zealand landscape, and suburban architecture from Stonefields, a new Auckland residential development, accompanied by audio of passages being read from H.G. Wells' novella The Time Machine. The two were shown together in 2014 as Leisure Valley at St Paul St Gallery in Auckland.

=== Block Paintings (2015–present) ===
Hipkins' latest series of works, Block Paintings, features large-format unique colour photographs of small, carefully hand-painted wooden children's blocks. The painted blocks are photographed against neutral backgrounds either straight-on or from above. Hipkins says of these works:

Sitting between sculpture, painting, and photography, I like to think of these new works as ‘kinder monuments' — a reference to their ambiguous scale, and the occupation of the field plane by massively enlarged brutalist wooden blocks.

In late 2018, Hipkins extended his experimentation in this body of work in the dealer gallery exhibition Block Units, including an 80-image slide projection of photographs of pairs of painted blocks arranged in sculptural formations alongside framed photographs.

== Filmmaking ==
Hipkins began making experimental short films in 2010. In 2014, his first feature film Erewhon - based on Samuel Butler's 1872 novel Erewhon, Or Over the Range - premiered at the New Zealand International Film Festival and the Edinburgh Art Festival.

Hipkins' recent film work, New Age (2016), is set at Avebury and calls on the tradition of spirit photography. The film premiered in 2016 at the International Competition at the 62nd International Short Film Festival Oberhausen.

In 2016, Hipkins was invited to make a work as part of a commissioned set of moving image responses to the writing of New Zealand artist Julian Dashper. Hipkins' resulting work New World melded extracts from an 1849 report encouraging immigration to North-East Texas, title-cards resembling abstract paintings, Google Earth footage and reproductions of plates drawn from the 1876 book American Pictures Drawn with Pen and Pencil as well as solarised reproductions of images from early 1980s copies of National Geographic and Penthouse.

In 2018, Hipkins produced The Precinct for the 9th iteration of the Queensland Art Gallery's Asia Pacific Triennial. The film, set along the Brisbane River, uses text drawn from the first published novel set in Brisbane, Dr Thomas Pennington Lucas's The Curse and its Cure (1894).

== Exhibitions ==
Hipkins has exhibited in New Zealand and internationally for over 20 years. In 2017 The Dowse Art Museum staged a major survey exhibition of his work, Gavin Hipkins: The Domain, which included works from the past 25 years stretching back to his time at Elam School of Fine Arts and including new commissions produced in 2017.

The following is a list of solo exhibitions in public art galleries.

- 1995: The Vision, Manawatu Art Gallery, Palmerston North; The Field, Teststrip, Auckland and Dunedin Public Art Gallery
- 1997: The Tunnel, Artspace Auckland
- 1998: New Zealand representative, Biennale of Sydney, Starkwhite; The Trench, The Physics Room, Christchurch
- 1999: The Pack, Artspace Sydney; The Circuit, Dunedin Public Art Gallery; Machine Art: Recent Work by Gavin Hipkins, Govett-Brewster Art Gallery
- 2000: The Habitat, Adam Art Gallery and Artspace Auckland
- 2001: The Homely, City Gallery Wellington, Sarjeant Gallery, Dunedin Public Art Gallery; The Stall, Waikato Museum of Art and History
- 2002: New Zealand representative, Sao Paulo Biennale; The Colony, Gus Fisher Gallery, Auckland
- 2006: The Village, Centre for Contemporary Photography, Melbourne
- 2007: The Field (Part 2), Institute of Modern Art, Brisbane
- 2008: Second Empire, Lopdell House Gallery, Auckland
- 2009: Bible Studies (New Testament), as part of Source Material: Five Conversations with the Past, Adam Art Gallery
- 2013: The Quarry, The Physics Room, Christchurch
- 2014: Leisure Valley, St Paul St Gallery, Auckland
- 2015: Erewhon, Māngere Arts Centre Ngā Tohu o Uenuku, Auckland
- 2017: Gavin Hipkins: The Domain, The Dowse Art Museum, Lower Hutt
- 2018: The Homely (Part II), as part of This Is New Zealand, City Gallery Wellington

== Residencies ==
- 1998: Inaugural residency for New Zealand artists at Artspace Sydney
- 2006: Artist's residency at the International Studio and Curatorial Program in New York
- 2007: McCahon House Residency in Auckland

== Publications ==
- Justin Paton, Gavin Hipkins : The Circuit, Dunedin: Dunedin Public Art Gallery, 1999 ISBN 0908910142
- Blair French, Gavin Hipkins: The Pack, Woolloomooloo, NSW: Artspace Visual Arts Centre. ISBN 187601752X
- Robert Leonard and Kelly Carmichael (eds), The Habitat, Auckland: Artspace, 2000. ISBN 0958210365
- Trevor Mahovsky, The Stall, Hamilton: Waikato Museum of Art and History, 2001.
- Lara Strongman, Peter Brunt and Blair French, Gavin Hipkins: The Homely, Wellington: City Gallery Wellington, 2001. ISBN 0958202869
- Gavin Hipkins: The Colony, Auckland: Gus Fisher Gallery, 2002.
- The Next Cabin, Auckland and Wellington: Gow Langsford Gallery and Hamish McKay Gallery, 2004.
- Heather Galbraith, The Sanctuary, Auckland: Rim Books, 2006. ISBN 0473106671
- Karra Rees, Gavin Hipkins: The Village, Melbourne: Centre for Contemporary Photography, 2006.
- Daniel Palmer, Empire, Auckland: Rim Books, 2008. ISBN 9780473130824
- Christina Barton (ed), Bible studies (New Testament), Wellington: Adam Art Gallery, Victoria University of Wellington, 2009. ISBN 1877309206
- Charlotte Huddleston (ed), Gavin Hipkins: Leisure Valley, Auckland: St Paul St Gallery, 2014. ISBN 9780992246303
- Peter Shand, Laurence Simmons, Erewhon, Māngere, Auckland: Māngere Arts Centre Ngā Tohu o Uenuku, 2015. ISBN 9780473326029
- Courtney Johnston (ed), with essays by Robert Leonard and George Clark, The Domain, Wellington: Victoria University Press and The Dowse Art Museum, 2017. ISBN 9781776561780

== Collections ==
- Auckland Art Gallery Toi o Tamaki
- University of Auckland
- Christchurch Art Gallery Te Puna o Waiwhetu
- Dunedin Public Art Gallery
- Museum of New Zealand Te Papa Tongarewa
- Queensland Art Gallery
- Victoria University of Wellington

== Gallery ==
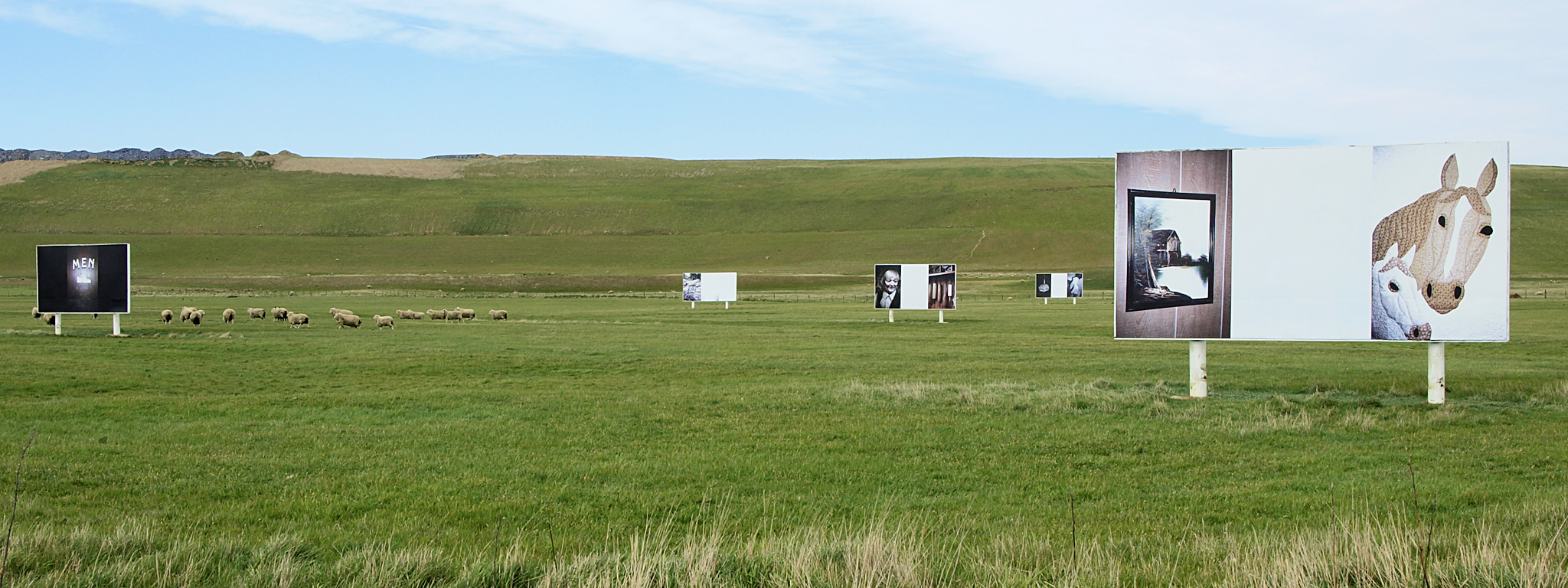
Photographic billboards by Gavin Hipkins installed at Macraes Flat, Otago, New Zealand

== Further information ==
- Artist profile on CIRCUIT
- Andrew Clifford, Sanctuary (The Bird), Auckland: University of Auckland, not dated.
- Clifford, Andrew (1 March 2005). "Something eerie this way comes". New Zealand Herald.
- Gavin Hipkins on Erewhon, Standing Room Only, Radio New Zealand 2014
- Gavin Hipkins: The Domain exhibition guide published by The Dowse Art Museum, 2017
- Gavin Hipkins interviewed by Kim Hill, Saturdays with Kim Hill, Radio New Zealand, 18 November 2017
- Robert Leonard, 'The Only Show in Town' (on Gavin Hipkins: The Domain, City Gallery Wellington, 16 January 2018
- Bruce Philips, Review of Gavin Hipkins: The Domain, Art Asia Pacific, 19 February 2018
- Terrence Handscombe, Living in Dulltopia: Gavin Hipkins' The Domain and The Homely II EyeContact, 11 April 2018
- Gavin Hipkins discusses his video project 'The Precinct', Queensland Art Gallery | Gallery of Modern Art, November 2018
