= Tom Kreisler =

New Zealand artist (1938–2002)

Tom Kreisler (1938–2002) was an Argentinian-born New Zealand artist and poet.

== Life ==
Kreisler was born in Buenos Aires, Argentina in 1938. His parents were Austrian Jewish refugees. In 1952, following the death of his father, a 13-year old Kreisler migrated to Christchurch, New Zealand. In New Zealand, he was taken care of by his aunt and uncle. He attended Ilam School of Fine Arts at the University of Canterbury alongside Dick Frizzell and John Coley. His teachers included Bill Sutton and Rudi Gopas.

Kreisler had stints working as copywriter, art critic and poetry editor. In the 1960s and 1970s, Kreisler exhibited at the Barry Lett Gallery in Auckland but his work gained limited recognition. Two weeks after his first date with future wife Lesley, he asked her to marry him. Together the couple had three sons. In the late 1960s, Kreisler and his family moved to New Plymouth where he taught at the local Boys' High School.

In 1977, Kreisler first travelled back to Latin America to visit his ill mother in Mexico although she died before he arrived. The death affected Kreisler greatly and he subsequently moved his entire family to the country. They spent time in Mexico, where his sister lived, and South America. As Lesley was unable to work, the family were often in financial hardship relying on one income. The family moved back to New Zealand two years later.

Kreisler spent the rest of his life living in New Plymouth, working as a teacher at Taranaki Polytechnic and Waikato Polytechnic. Kreisler associated with artists such as Darcy Lange, Warren Viscoe, Dick Frizzell and Toss Woollaston and was influential in the establishment and ongoing support of the Govett-Brewster Art Gallery, being a key sounding board and advocate for its directors from John Maynard through to Gregory Burke. On the back of being the inaugural Trustbank Artist in Residence, Christchurch (1989), he established with Priscilla Pitts the Taranaki Polytechnic Artist in Residence programme.

He died aged 63 at home in New Plymouth following a heart attack on 27 March 2002.

In 2015, Shirley Horrocks directed the documentary Tom Who? The Enigma of Tom Kreisler about Kreisler's life.

== Art ==
Kreisler's early work was influenced by Pop Art, a style which carried through to his later works. He predominantly painted in broad and scumbled strokes on canvas.
