= Paula Savage =

New Zealand art director

- Citizenship: New Zealand
- Occupation: Art Museum Director
- Era: 1990-2012
- Employer: Wellington City Council
- Organization: City Gallery Wellington
- Known for: Art Museum Management and curationj
- Successor: Elizabeth Caldwell

Paula Savage is a New Zealand museum curator and director. She was Director of City Gallery Wellington Te Whare Toi from 1990 to 2012. In that time she oversaw its rebranding and the move to a permanent home in Wellington’s Civic Square. She was also responsible for a programme of high profile overseas exhibitions of key international artists such as Yayoi Kusama, Robert Mapplethorpe and Frida Kahlo.

== Life and career ==
After serving as history curator at Rotorua Museum Te Whare Taonga o Te Arawa, Savage was appointed Director of the Wellington City Gallery. Here she oversaw the redevelopment of the former Wellington Public Library Building in collaboration with architect Stuart Gardyne and the Gallery's relocation in 1993. At the same time the Gallery was rebranded in association with the advertising agency Saatchi & Saatchi and renamed City Gallery Wellington. To open the refurbished building, Gregory Burke curated an exhibition by the German artist Rosemarie Trockel. Savage described the show as ‘tough and challenging’ adding, ‘that’s what the gallery is going to be about.’ In 1994 Savage was in charge of the installation of the now iconic neon sculpture Fault created by Ralph Hotere and Bill Culbert. It was commissioned by Scollay Holdings through the Wellington City Council Arts Bonus scheme.

In the first five years of Savage's Directorship three exhibitions met opposition because of their sexual content. In 1995 New Zealand Customs seized three photographs from an exhibition by the American artist Robert Mapplethorpe for possible objectionable content. The Chief Censor's office finally applied an R18 rating (which the Gallery had already implemented) along with instructions that the catalogue had to be sold in a sealed plastic bag. Four years later a Keith Haring exhibition only attracted 30,000 people, half the number expected. Savage claimed the Christian Heritage Party and the protest group City Gallery Watch were responsible for the low attendance figures. The two groups had protested that Haring's images were offensive through their depictions of sodomy, masturbation and bestiality.

In 2009 Savage and Gardyne worked together again to add a $6.3 million extension to the Gallery's exhibition space. The opening of this redevelopment was celebrated by an exhibition of Japanese artist Yayoi Kusama. In the same year Savage appointed the Gallery's first Māori curator, Reuben Friend. Savage left the City Gallery in 2012 and took on responsibility for the international residency programme of the Auckland dealer gallery Two Rooms. In 2015 she became an independent art advisor.

== Selected exhibitions during Savage’s directorship ==
- 1991 Good as Gold: Billy Apple Art Transactions, 1981-1991.
- 1994 Tony Fomison: What Shall we Tell Them?
- 1997 Ralph Hotere: Out the Black Window .
- 1998 Exhibition of the Century: Modern Masters from the Stedelijk Museum, Amsterdam. 84,000 people attended, 14,000 more than forecast. Art curator and writer Justin Paton said of the exhibition, 'what stays with you after you leave this show is a sense of high-heartedness, even intimacy: against a backdrop of world events as awful as any have been, the objects sing out like flowers in a bombsite.’
- 2000 Parihaka: The Art of Passive Resistance was a partnership between the City Gallery and Parihaka Pā Trustees. Parihaka spokesman Te Miringa Hohaia said of the exhibition, ‘It’s the first time that the Parihaka people have ever given their consent as a community to participate so publicly in such a thing as an exhibition, film, or book, or anything like that.’
- Viva la Vida : Frida Kahlo, Diego Rivera and Mexican Modernism. The exhibition was the collection of Jacques and Natasha Gelman. The Gelmans lived in Mexico and owned, 'an outstandingly fine group' of 20th-century European paintings and sculptures They were also patrons, friends and collectors of Kahlo and Rivera.
- 2001 Prospect: New Art New Zealand. This exhibition was planned as the first of what was to be a triennial event. Despite suspicions by critics that it would be a one-off occasions, three more editions of Prospect were exhibited, in 2004, 2007 and 2012. Prospect 1 (2001) was curated by Lara Strongman, Prospect 2 (2004) by Emma Bugden, Prospect 3 (2007) by Heather Galbraith and Prospect 4 (2012) by Kate Montgomery.
- 2002 Tracey Moffatt. Curated by Lara Strongman and Paula Savage.
- 2006 Patricia Piccinini : In Another Life. This was one of City Gallery's most popular exhibitions, attracting ‘upwards of 120,000 visitors’.
- 2009 Kusama : Mirrored Years. The exhibition was on view for four-and-a-half months and drew an audience of over 88,155 people.
- 2011 Oceania: Imagining the Pacific. Shown in partnership with Te Papa, the exhibition was delivered across the two institutions by curators Gregory O'Brien, Paula Savage, Reuben Friend and Abby Cunnane.

== Awards ==
2008 New Zealand Order of Merit for Services to the Arts.
