= Julia Waite =

Art historian

- Education: Masters in Art History with First Class Honours (University of Auckland), Masters of Museum and Heritage Studies (Victoria University), Bachelor of Arts with First Class Honours in Art History (University of Otago)
- Occupations: Art curator, author
- Employer: Auckland Art Gallery

Julia Waite is a New Zealand art historian, curator, and author. She is currently Curator of New Zealand Art at Auckland Art Gallery.

== Family background ==
Waite had an upbringing that was influenced by both her parents' passions for art. She lived in Wellington throughout her childhood, and also recalls artworks she engaged with at her grandparents' house. This sparked her interest in art and art history from a young age, which she sustained until she studied the subjects at a university level.

== Career ==
Whilst studying for her Bachelor of Arts with First Class Honours in Art History at the University of Otago she gained experience working at Dunedin Public Art Gallery which further piqued her interest in gallery and museum spaces, and more significantly in the world of art curation. Her education extends to include both a Masters in Art History from the University of Auckland with First Class Honours, and a Masters of Museum and Heritage Studies from Victoria University.

Her research and curatorial outputs often centre around modern art in New Zealand, representing underrepresented artists, various modernism movements around the world, and photography.

She is currently Curator of New Zealand Art at Auckland Art Gallery. Additionally she has worked at National Gallery Singapore and The Substation, Singapore.

== Curatorial projects ==
Date	Title	Location	Source
2013	5th Auckland Triennial	Auckland Art Gallery	
16 May 2015 - 10 April 2016	Freedom and Structure: Cubism and New Zealand Art 1930-1960	Touring Exhibition	
2016	Space to Dream: Recent Art from South America	Auckland Art Gallery	
2017-2018	Gordon Walters: New Vision (co-curation)	Touring Exhibition	
10 August 2019 - 27 March 2020	A Place to Paint: Colin McCahon in Auckland (co-curation)	Auckland Art Gallery	
3 July 2021 - 23 January 2022	Bill Culbert | Slow Wonder	Auckland Art Gallery	
2024	Modern Women: Flights of Time	Auckland Art Gallery	

Talks
Date	Title	Location	Source
23 June 2015	Monster Field: Surreal by Nature: Curator's Tour with Julia Waite	Auckland Art Gallery	
21 November 2020	Exiles and Expatriates: Modern Women and States of Unbelonging	Philip Carter Family Auditorium, Christchurch Art Gallery	
- -	Louise Henderson: From Life	Christchurch Art Gallery with Felicity Milburn	
- -	Light and Reflections | Helen Beaglehole in Conversation with Julia Waite	Te Tuhi Art Gallery	

== Research outputs ==
- A Way Through: Cubism and New Zealand Art 1930-1960 (2016) - The University of Auckland - Bell L (Editor), Waite Julia (Thesis/Dissertation)
- Freedom and Structure: Cubism and New Zealand Art 1930-1960 (2017) - Auckland Art Gallery - Julia Waite (Book)
- Working towards Meaning - The Restoration of Colin McCahon's Chapel Windows (2019) - Auckland Art Gallery (Gallery e-publication)
- Louise Henderson: From Life (2019) - Auckland Art Gallery & Christchurch Art Gallery - Felicity Milburn, Lara Strongman, Julia Waite (Book)
- Looking for a New Country: Christopher Perkins in New Zealand (2020) - Adam Art Gallery Te Pataka Toi - Christopher Perkins, Christina Barton, Priscilla Pitts, Julia Waite, Lachlan Taylor (Book)
- Bill Culbert: Slow Wonder (2021) - Auckland Art Gallery - Bill Culbert, Julia Waite, Kirsten Lacy, Justin Clemens (Book)
- Modern Women Flight of Time (2024) - Julia Waite (Book)
