= Andrew Patterson (architect) =

New Zealand architect (born 1960)

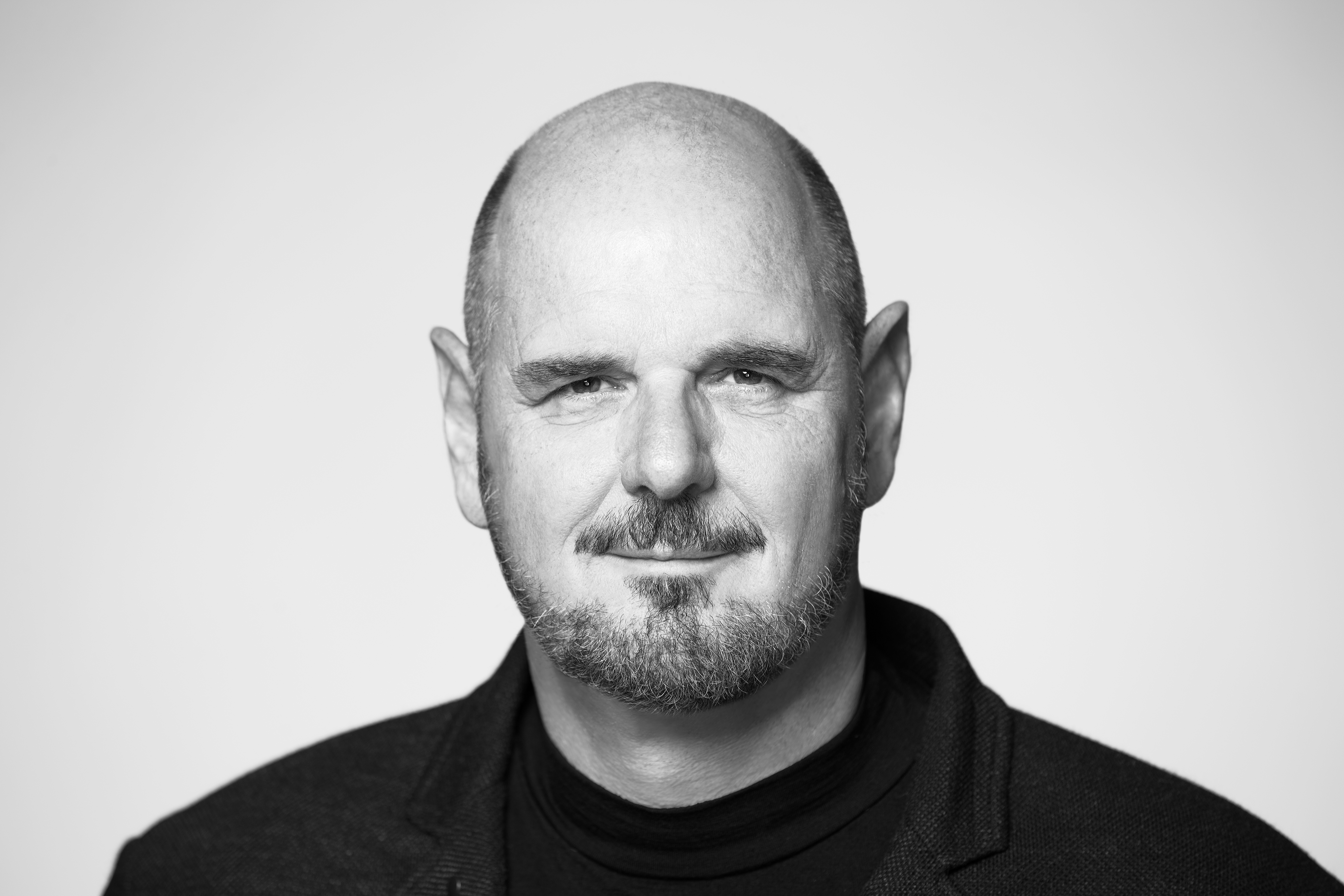
- Born: 12 June 1960 (age 65); Waikato
- Education: Kings College, Auckland; School of Architecture, University of Auckland
- Occupation: Architect
- Known for: Patterson Associates, formed 1990

Andrew James Campbell Patterson (born 12 June 1960) is an Auckland, New Zealand-based architect.

== Early life and education ==
Born in the Waikato region, Patterson claims to be from a family of four generations of professionals, lawyers and doctors.

Patterson completed a Bachelor of Architecture degree at The University of Auckland in 1984 and started his own practice in 1986.

== Career ==
Patterson Associates designed the Len Lye Centre, which is part of the Govett-Brewster Art Gallery in New Plymouth. The centre opened in 2015 to show the works of influential kinetic sculpture Len Lye.

The Geyser building, in Auckland, is the recipient of New Zealand's only 6 Green Star rating from the New Zealand Green Building Council.

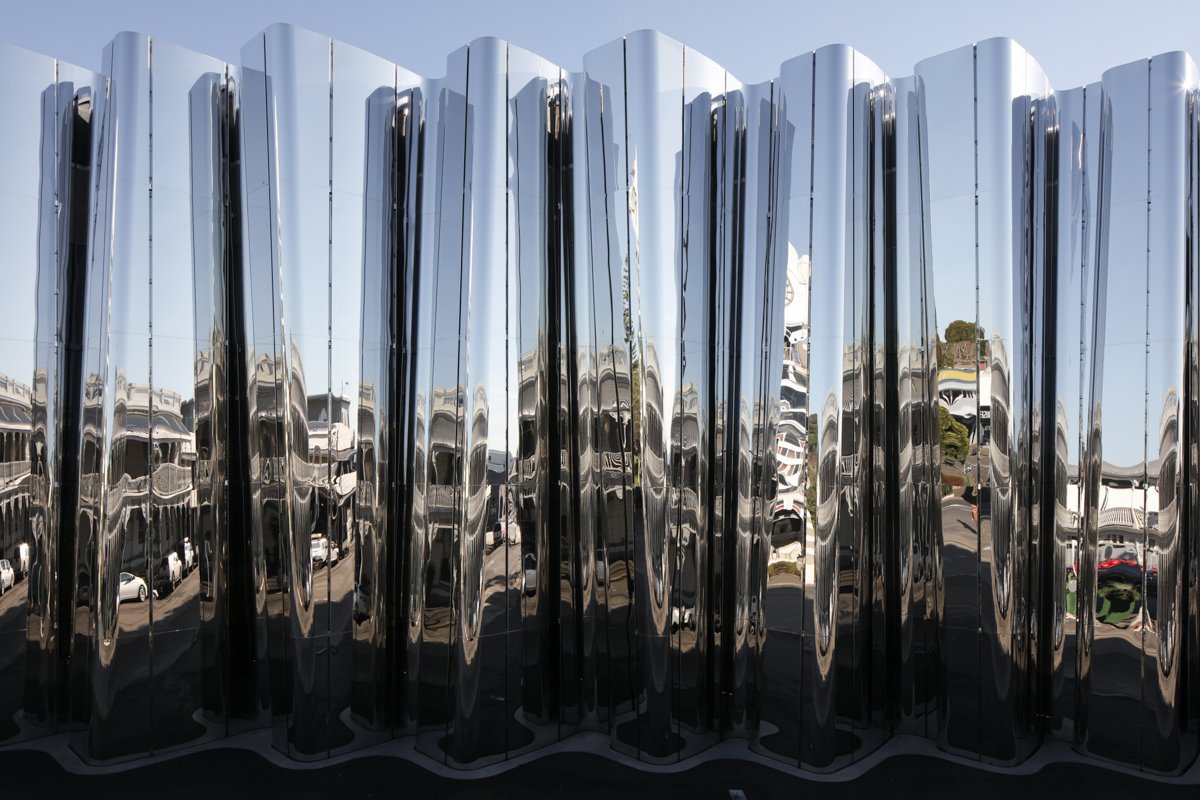
Stainless steel exterior of the Len Lye Centre, New Plymouth, New Zealand

Patterson Associates's MaiMai House was one of 16 finalists in the "private homes" category of the 2nd annual World Architecture Festival in 2009.

Patterson is Fellow of the New Zealand Institute of Architects (FNZIA). In 2017 Patterson was awarded the FNZIA's gold medal. He is the director of Patterson Associates.

Patterson has advocated for greater use of indigenous New Zealand stories and symbols in the design of public buildings.

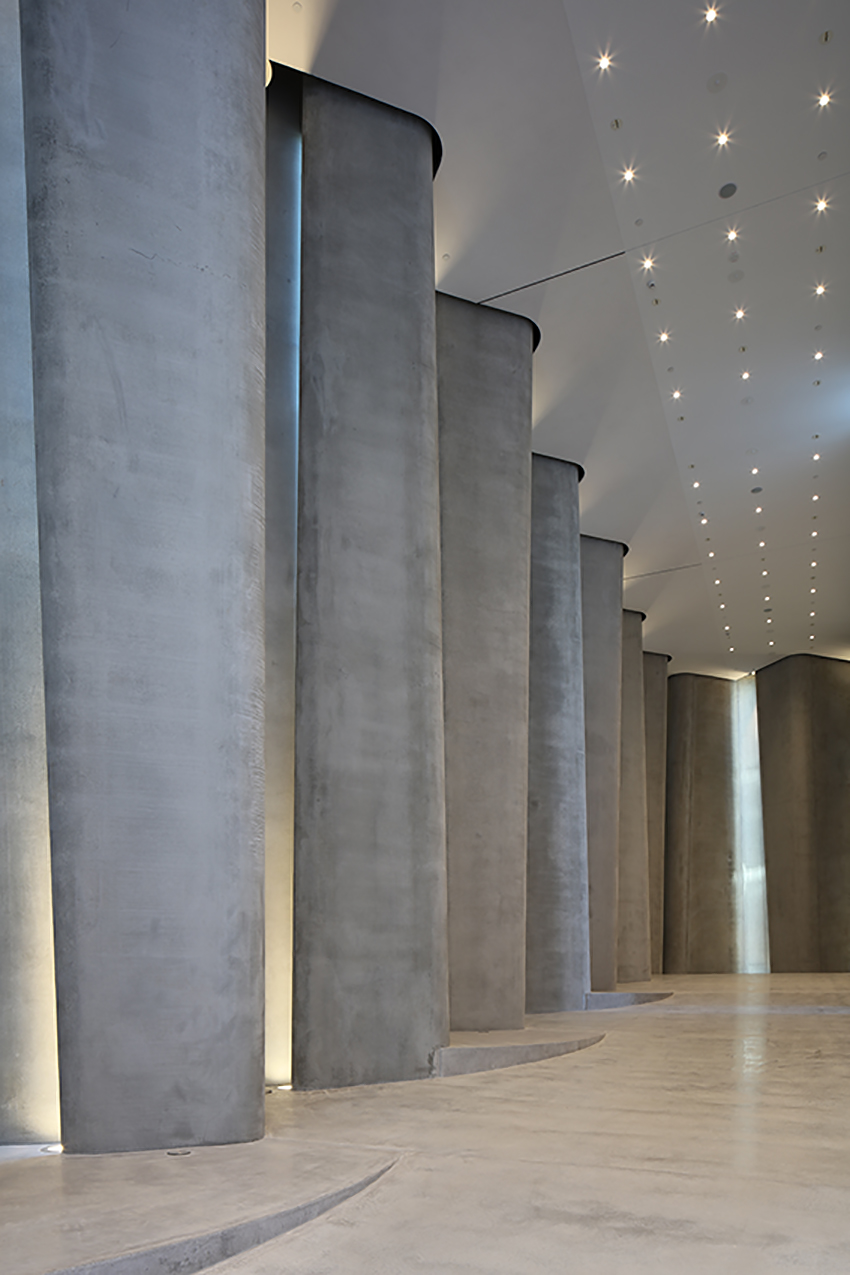
Concrete interior of the Len Lye Centre, New Plymouth, New Zealand

== Personal life ==
On the morning of 27 May 2015, Patterson was leaving his home in his Porsche SUV and hit cyclist Peter Redmond, although he thought at the time he had hit a road cone. Redmond suffered multiple rib fractures and abrasions, a dislocated knee, and a lacerated liver. He remained hospitalised for weeks, underwent multiple surgeries and was likely to remain partially disabled or undergo further surgeries, the court heard.

Charged with careless driving causing injury, Patterson initially pleaded not guilty before changing his plea to guilty after a court adjournment. Judge Evangelos Thomas ordered Patterson to pay NZD$3,000 in emotional harm reparations, in addition to "significant" payments he'd already made, and barred him from driving for six months.
