= Mary Kisler =

New Zealand art historian and curator

Mary Kisler MNZM
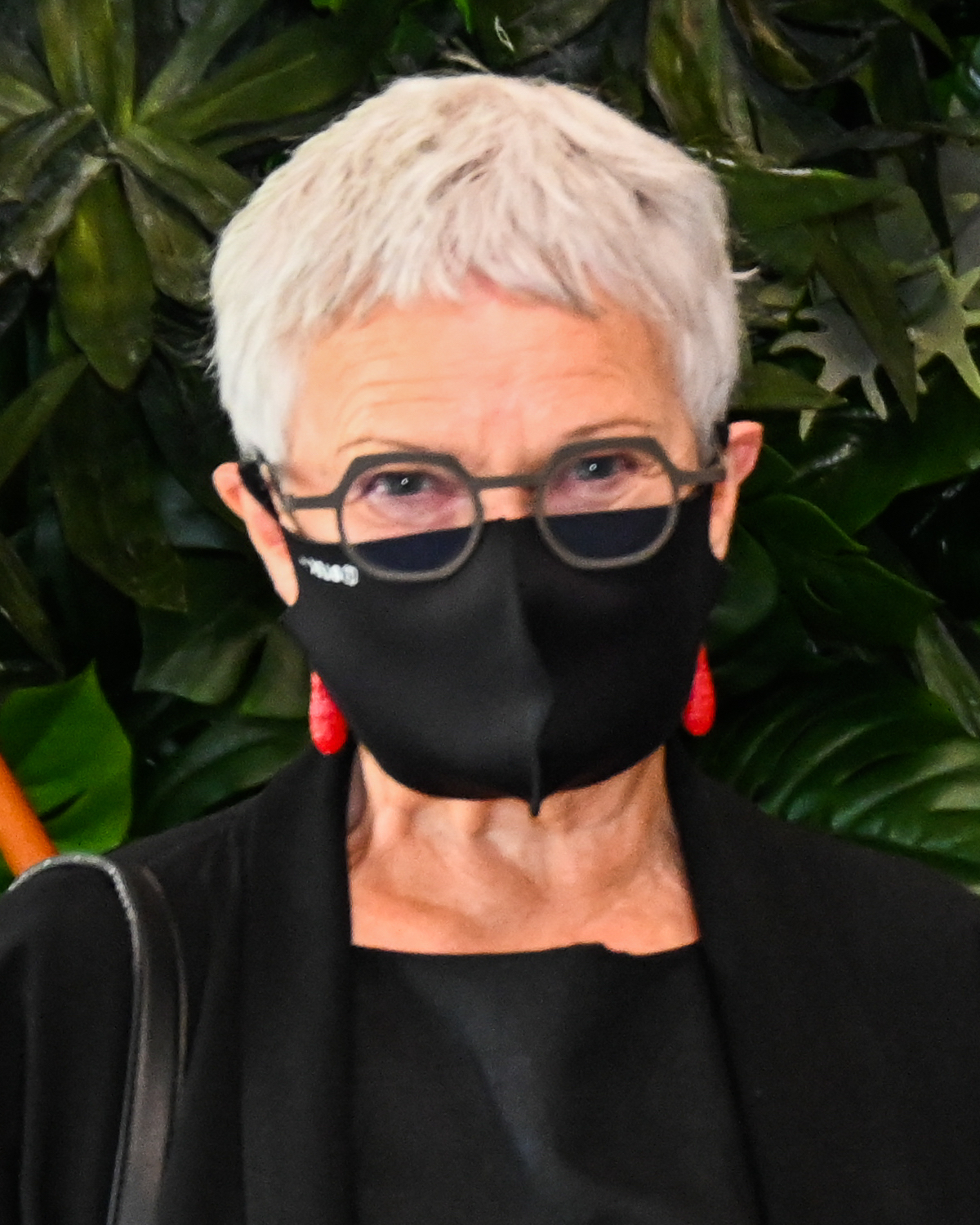
- Kisler in 2022

Academic work
- Discipline: Art history
- Institutions: Auckland Art Gallery Toi o Tāmaki

Mary Louise Kisler MNZM is a New Zealand curator, author, art historian and Radio New Zealand art commentator. She is best known for her publications which include Angels & Aristocrats: Early European Art in New Zealand Public Galleries (2010) and Finding Frances Hodgkins (2019).

She has been a curator at the Auckland Art Gallery Toi o Tāmaki since 1998 and is now the Senior Curator, Mackelvie Collection, International Art.

== Biography ==
Kisler earned her master's degree in art history and Italian at the University of Auckland in 1994. In 1996 she commenced a PhD at the University on Dis/Ordered Femininity in Italian Renaissance Art.

Kisler's 2010 book Angels & Aristocrats: Early European Art in New Zealand Public Collections brings together artworks from the collections of five New Zealand galleries: Auckland Art Gallery Toi o Tāmaki, Museum of New Zealand Te Papa Tongarewa, Christchurch Art Gallery Te Puna o Waiwhetu, Dunedin Public Art Gallery and Whanganui's Sarjeant Gallery. A touring exhibition with a selection of works from Kisler's book travelled to museums and galleries around New Zealand.

In the 2021 Queen's Birthday Honours, Kisler was appointed a Member of the New Zealand Order of Merit, for services to art history and curation.

== Publications ==
- Everyday Miracles: The art of Stanley Spencer (Dunedin Public Art Gallery, 2003).
- Angels & Aristocrats: Early European Art in New Zealand Public Collections (Random House, 2010).
- Frances Hodgkins: European Journeys (Auckland University Press, 2019).
- Finding Frances Hodgkins (Massey University Press, 2019).
- The Dark Dad: War and Trauma — a Daughter's Tale (Massey University Press, 2025)
