= SCAPE Public Art =

Public art trust in Christchurch, New Zealand

SCAPE Public Art is a producer of public art in Christchurch, New Zealand. The Art & Industry Biennial Trust was set up in 1998.

== History ==
Deborah McCormick, in her first year after graduating in 1988 from the University of Canterbury School of Fine Arts was involved in setting up the Art & Industry Biennial Trust, chaired by Sir Kerry Bourke. Founding board members included Dame Adrienne Stewart. SCAPE Public Art season was a biennial event until 2016 when it went annual, the first one was in 2000.

By 2017 SCAPE Public Art was responsible for over 214 temporary and 12 permanent artworks since their inception in Christchurch.

In 2023 Richard Aindow was appointed executive director of SCAPE taking over from Deborah McCormick who was in the role for 25 years since it began.

== Activities ==
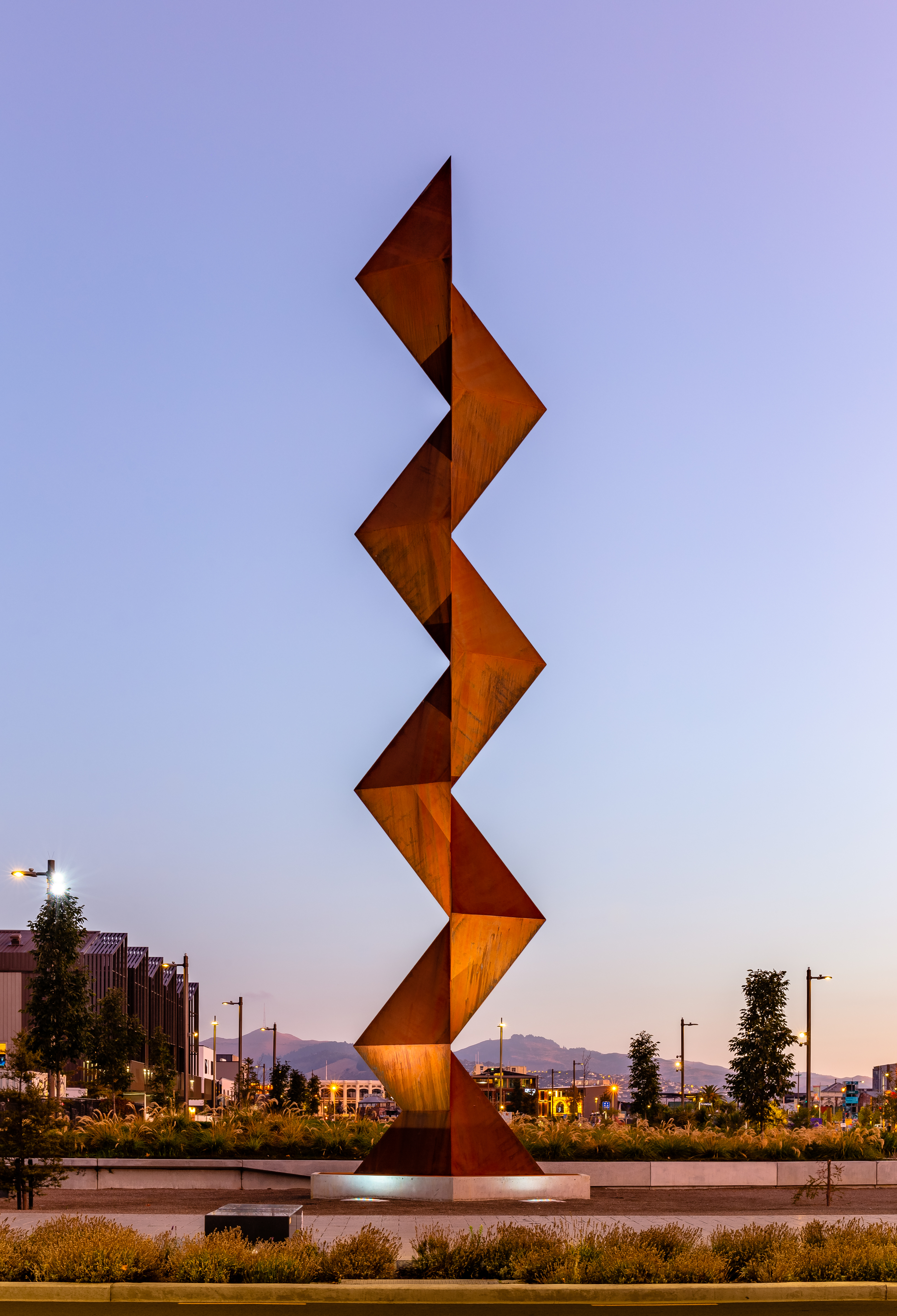
Vaka 'A Hina sculpture

Artworks in Christchurch include the kinetic sculpture Nucleus by Phil Price installed on High St in 2006 with council providing $40,000 of the $110,000 cost. STAY by British sculptor Sir Antony Gormley is in the river near the corner of Gloucester St and Cambridge Tce installed as of the Scape Public Art festival 2015. VAKA ‘A HINA by Sēmisi Fetokai Potauaine was installed in 2019.

The 6th SCAPE Christchurch Biennial of Art in Public Space was delayed due to the 2010 Canterbury earthquake and again because of the 2011 Christchurch earthquake.

The SCAPE Public Art Season in 2016 selected Mark Catley and Janna van Hasselt to have their art produced for the Re:ACTIVATE exhibition from over 60 artists who attended an earlier SCAPE Public Art Development Workshop. Re:ACTIVATE was curated by Paula Orrell of CoCA. There was also Re:ACTIVATE Kids by artist George Lewis. In 2016 also included in the season were a SCAPE Public Art Walkway, exhibition Presence curated by Heather Galbraith's and a series of artists talks.

Public art invokes a response and we've had all manner of responses, but in the end, it is a platform for a conversation. (Deborah McCormick, director SCAPE Public Art 2017)
