= Courtney Johnston =

Chief executive of Te Papa museum

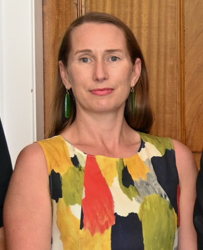
- Johnston in 2026
- Born: 1979 (age 46–47); Taranaki, New Zealand
- Education: Victoria University of Wellington
- Occupations: Museum professional Radio correspondent
- Spouse: William McAloon (died 2012) Reuben Friend

Courtney Thorneycroft Johnston (born 1979) is a New Zealand museum professional, a national radio correspondent, and the chief executive of the Museum of New Zealand Te Papa Tongarewa.

== Early life and education ==
Born in 1979, Johnston grew up on a dairy farm on Mangorei Road in Taranaki. She attended Mangorei School and New Plymouth Girls' High School before moving south, initially to Otago, then to Wellington to study and work as a visitor host at Te Papa. In 2004 she earned a master's degree in art history from Victoria University of Wellington, with a thesis on art historian Peter Tomory.

== Career ==
Johnston has lived and worked in Wellington with roles at a variety of galleries and cultural institutions, including the Adam Art Gallery, City Gallery Wellington, and from 2012 to 2018 was the director of the Dowse Art Museum after roles at the National Library of New Zealand and Boost New Media where she worked in communications and web roles.

In 2019, Johnston became the youngest chief executive to head The Museum of New Zealand Te Papa Tongarewa where in 2024 she introduced a $35 entry fee for international visitors. She is also a board member of Arts Wellington and the Wellington Performing Arts Trust and the immediate past chair of the umbrella group Museums Aotearoa. In August 2026, Johnston announced her resignation at chief executive of Te Papa, effective from October that year.

She has worked as an arts correspondent for Radio New Zealand's "Nine to Noon" programme since 2010.

== Awards ==
Johnston was the 2015 recipient of a Winston Churchill Memorial Trust travel grant for researching contemporary museum practices in the U.S.

== Personal life ==
Johnston married art curator William McAloon. He died in 2012. In 2022 Johnston was living in inner city Wellington apartment with her husband Reuben Friend. She has a brown belt in Brazilian jiu-jitsu.
