= Rhana Devenport =

Australian gallery director

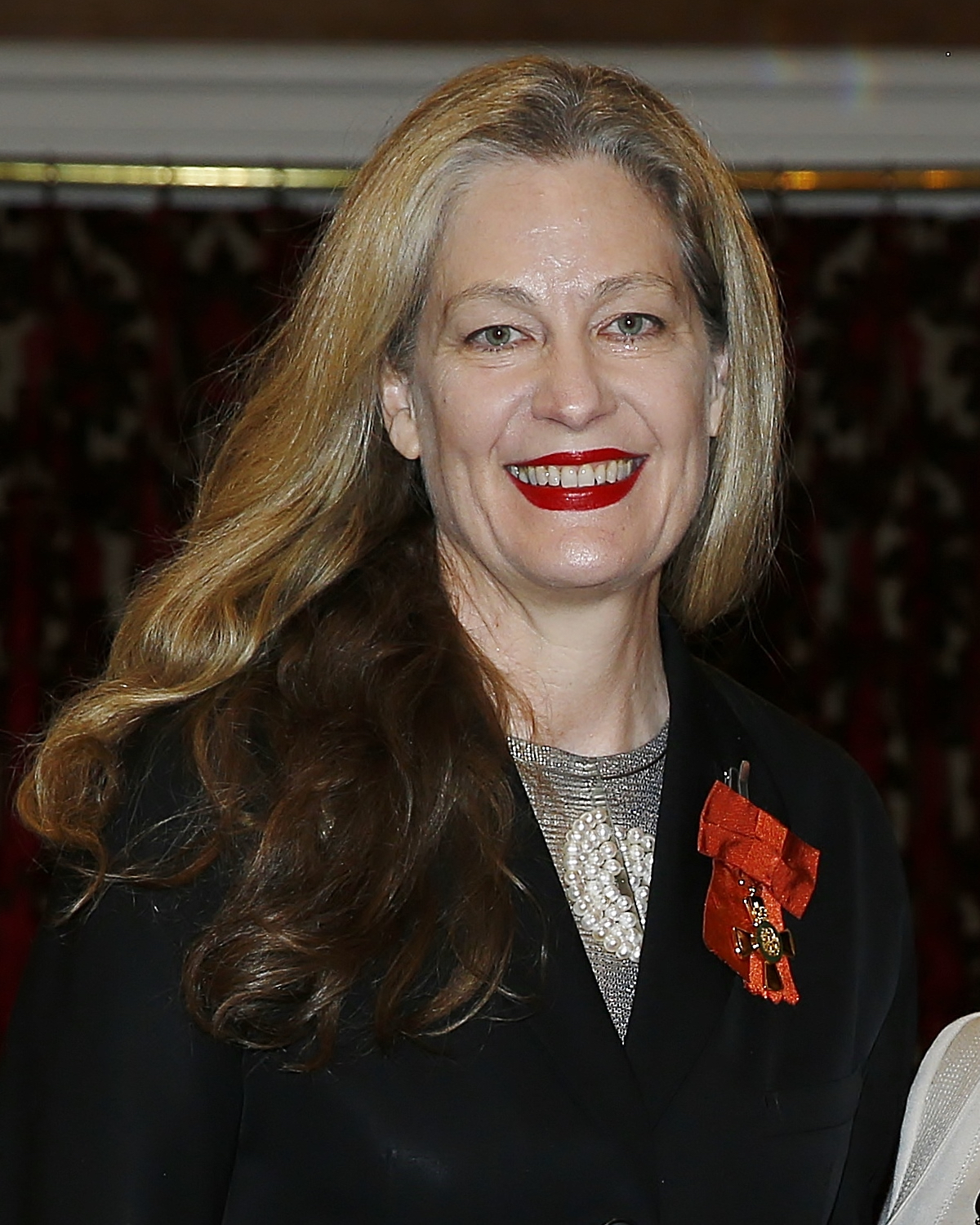
Devenport in 2018

Rhana Jean Devenport ONZM (born 1960) is an Australian-born art curator and museum professional. She was director of the Auckland Art Gallery from 2013 to 2018, after which she became director of the Art Gallery of South Australia in Adelaide. She has announced that she will be moving to Sydney at the end of her contract on 7 July 2024.

== Early life ==
Devenport was born and grew up in Brisbane, Queensland, Australia.

== Career ==
Devenport began her career as an art and theatre teacher, and a practising artist. From 1994 to 2004 she was senior project officer with the Asia Pacific Triennial at the Queensland Art Gallery. She was visual arts manager with the Sydney Festival in 2004, an independent curator, curator in residence at Artspace, Auckland for three months in 2005, manager of public programmes and publications with the Biennale of Sydney from 2005 to 2006.

Devenport was appointed as director of the Govett-Brewster Art Gallery in New Plymouth in 2006. In this role she led the fundraising effort for the development of the Len Lye Centre. She was appointed director of the Auckland Art Gallery in 2013. In 2015, Devenport took part in the second annual Global Museum Leaders Colloquium, held at the Metropolitan Museum.

In 2015, Devenport curated New Zealand artist Lisa Reihana's video work In Pursuit of Venus [infected] at Auckland Art Gallery. Reihana was selected to present this work as New Zealand's representative at the 2017 Venice Biennale, with Devenport as the curator for the presentation.

Devenport left the Auckland Art Gallery to become director of the Art Gallery of South Australia in Adelaide in October 2018. Her six-year contract ends on 7 July 2024, and in March 2024 she announced her departure and move to Sydney at this time.

== Honours ==
In the 2018 New Year Honours, Devenport was appointed an Officer of the New Zealand Order of Merit, for services to arts governance.

== Publications ==
As editor and/or contributor:

- Lisa Reihana: In pursuit of Venus, Auckland: Auckland Art Gallery, 2015. ISBN 9780864633019
- Groundworks / Bill Culbert, New Plymouth: Govett-Brewster Art Gallery, 2013. ISBN 9780908848720
- Laurence Aberhart: Recent Taranaki Photographs: Govett-Brewster Art Gallery, 2012. ISBN 9780908848539
- Peter Robinson : snow ball blind time, New Plymouth: Govett-Brewster Art Gallery, 2010
- Alex Monteith : accelerated geographies, New Plymouth: Govett-Brewster Art Gallery, 2010. ISBN 9780908848645
- Lisa Reihana: Digital Marae, New Plymouth: Govett Brewster Art Gallery, 2007. ISBN 9780908848324
