= James Mackelvie =

Welsh-New Zealander clergyman

- Born: James Tannock Mackelvie; 1824; Ardrossan, Scotland
- Died: 2 June 1885 (aged 60–61); London, England
- Occupation: Philanthropist

James Tannock Mackelvie (1824–1885) was a New Zealand philanthropist who donated a substantial art collection to the Auckland Art Gallery. He was also a founder of the New Zealand Philosophical Society (later Auckland War Memorial Museum) and the Auckland Acclimatisation Society.

Mackelvie's donation of artworks, collected by himself in Europe, was accompanied by a substantial bequest to maintain the new permanent gallery. In September 1891 Auckland's Municipal Corporation erected a Mackelvie annexe to the building to hold the Grey Literary Collection and the Auckland Free Public Library.

== Biography ==
Mackelvie was born in Ardrossan, Scotland in 1824. Mackelvie in early life was engaged as supercargo of a vessel during the Crimean War, and subsequently as purser on an Atlantic liner. Leaving the sea, he obtained an appointment in a large mercantile house in London, and was so engaged in 1865, when Dr. Campbell, desiring a partner to take charge of his business while he visited Europe, entered into an agreement with Mackelvie, who came to Auckland and assumed the direction of the business of Messrs. Brown, Campbell & Co. until 1870, when the partnership terminated by effluxion of time. During that short period, however, Mackelvie had amassed a fortune by means of judicious mining investments on the Thames goldfields. He returned to Europe a month or two after quitting his connection with Brown, Campbell & Co., and lived in retirement, employing a large part of his time in collecting the art treasures which he had resolved to bequeath to the city where his fortune was made. He returned to England in 1871, during which he periodically send books to the Auckland Institute library, forming much of the library's early collection.

Many valuable paintings and sketches were forwarded to Auckland during his lifetime, and at his death, which took place on 4 June 1885, by the terms of his will, after providing for about £35,000 legacies, in some of which the trustees have a reversionary interest, the balance of the estate was left in trust for the people of Auckland. The legacy, owing to the great depreciation in all kinds of property, is very much less than the testator no doubt intended, but, including the reversionary interest in legacies, the trustees hope the amount may not be far short of £30,000, besides the valuable collection now in the Art Gallery. During his stay in the colony Mackelvie was director of the Bank of New Zealand, the New Zealand Loan and Mercantile Agency Company, and other companies.
