= Auckland Art Gallery =

Art museum in Auckland, New Zealand

- Toi o Tāmaki
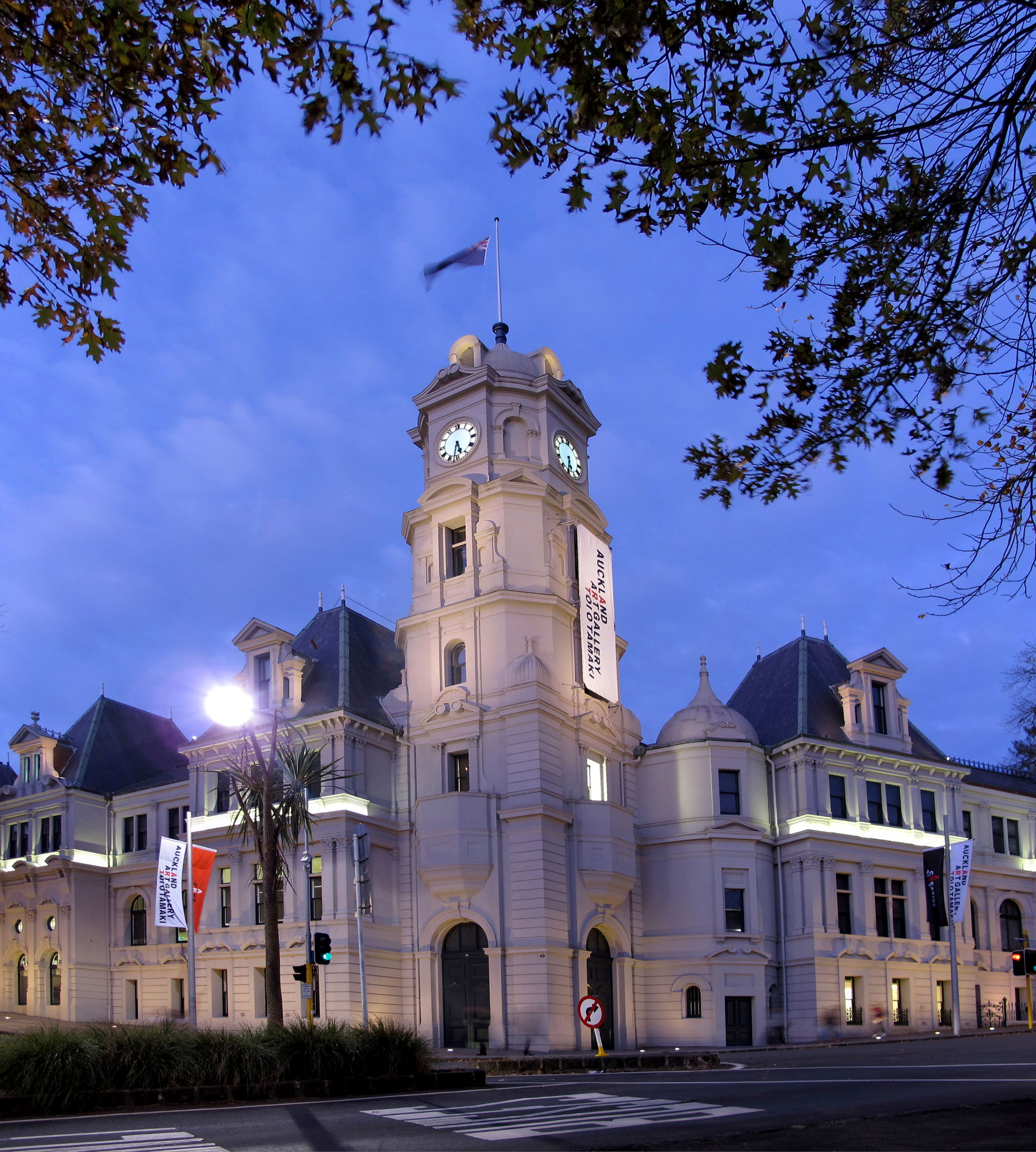
- The gallery building, showing the clock tower
- Interactive fullscreen map
- Former names: Auckland City Art Gallery

General information
- Type: Art gallery, formerly public library and council offices
- Architectural style: French Renaissance
- Location: Corner Wellesley and Kitchener Streets, Auckland CBD
- Coordinates: 36°51′05″S 174°45′59″E
- Completed: 1887; 139 years ago
- Owner: Tātaki Auckland Unlimited, Auckland Council (indirectly through Tātaki Auckland Unlimited)

Design and construction
- Architects: John Harry Grainger & Charles D'Ebro; refurbished by FJMT + Archimedia (2011)
- Awards: 2013 World Building of the Year, World Architecture Festival

Website
- http://www.aucklandartgallery.com/

Heritage New Zealand – Category 1
- Designated: 11-Nov-1983
- Reference no.: 92

Auckland Art Gallery (Māori: Toi o Tāmaki) is the principal public gallery in Auckland, New Zealand. It has the most extensive collection of national and international art in New Zealand and frequently hosts travelling international exhibitions.

Set below the hilltop Albert Park in the central-city area of Auckland, the gallery was established in 1888 as the first permanent art gallery in New Zealand.

The building originally housed both the Auckland Art Gallery and the Auckland public library, and opened with collections donated by benefactors Governor Sir George Grey and James Tannock Mackelvie. This was the second public art gallery in New Zealand, after the Dunedin Public Art Gallery, which opened three years earlier in 1884. Wellington's New Zealand Academy of Fine Arts opened in 1892 and a Wellington Public Library in 1893.

In 2009, it was announced that the gallery received a donation of artworks from American hedge fund manager Julian Robertson, valued at over $100 million, the largest ever of its kind in the region. The works were put on display in 2024.

== History ==
Throughout the 1870s many people in Auckland felt the city needed a municipal art collection but the newly established Auckland City Council was unwilling to commit funds to such a project. Following pressure by such eminent people as Sir Maurice O'Rorke (Speaker of the House of Representatives) and others, the building of a combined Art Gallery & Library was made necessary by the promise of significant bequests from two major benefactors, former colonial governor Sir George Grey and James Tannock Mackelvie. Grey had promised books for a municipal library as early as 1872, and eventually donated a large number of manuscripts, rare books and paintings from his collection to the Auckland Gallery & Library (in total this amounted to over 12,500 items, including 53 paintings). He also gave material to Cape Town, where he had also been Governor. The Grey bequest includes works by Caspar Netscher, Henry Fuseli, William Blake and David Wilkie.

Mackelvie was a businessman who had retained an interest in Auckland affairs after returning to Britain. In the early 1880s he announced a gift of 105 framed watercolours, oil paintings, and a collection of drawings. His gift eventually amounted to 140 items, including paintings, decorative arts, ceramics and furniture from his London residence – these form the core of the Mackelvie Trust Collection, which is shared between the Auckland City Art Gallery, the Public Library and the Auckland Museum. Mackelvie's will stipulated a separate gallery to display his bequest; this was not popular with the city authorities, but a special room was dedicated to the collection in 1893 and eventually the top lit Mackelvie Gallery was built in 1916. The Mackelvie Trust continues to purchase art works to add to the collection, which now includes significant 20th-century bronzes by Archipenko, Bourdelle, Epstein, Moore and Elisabeth Frink.

== The collection ==
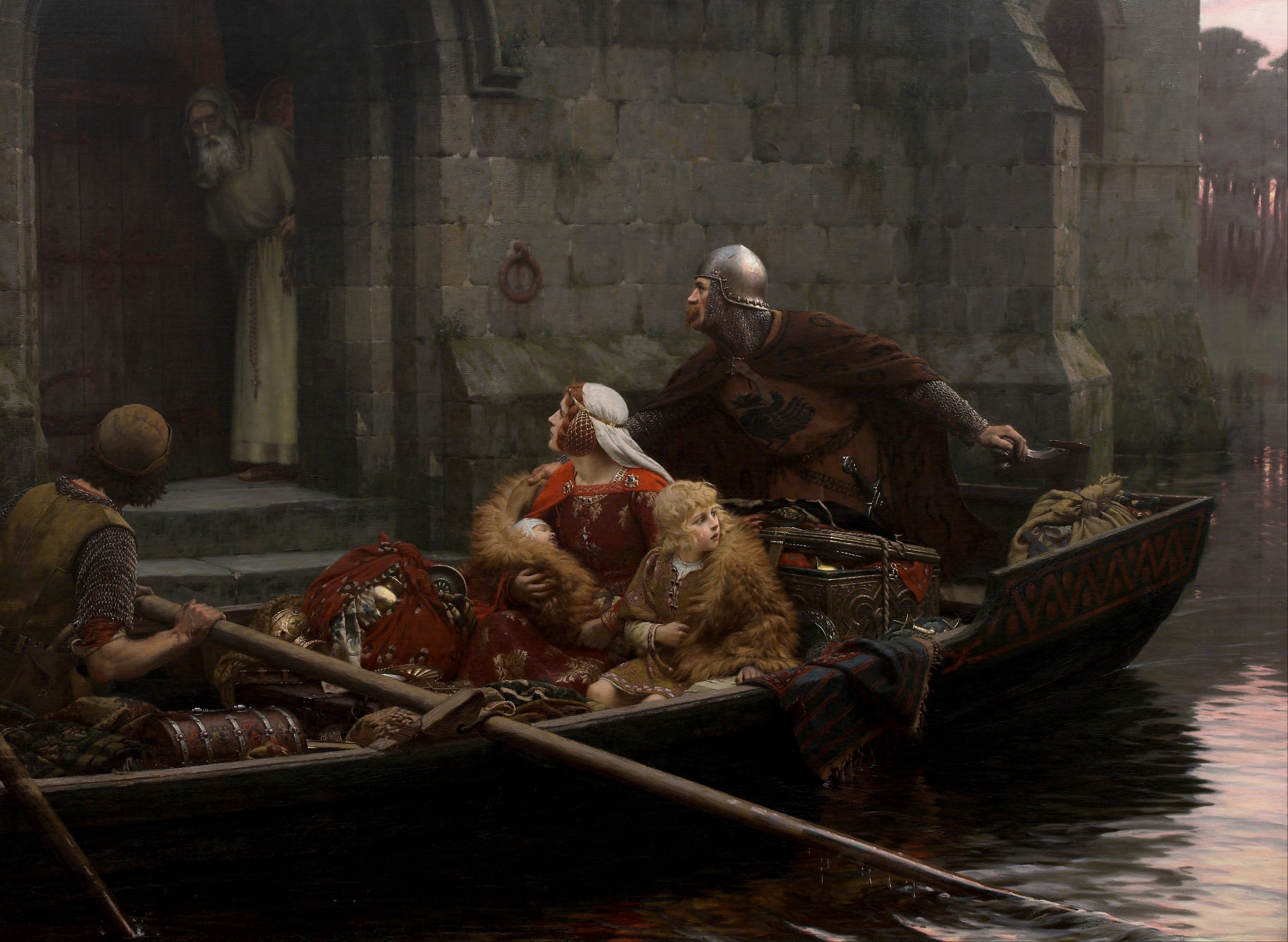
In Time of Peril, by Lord Leighton, 1897

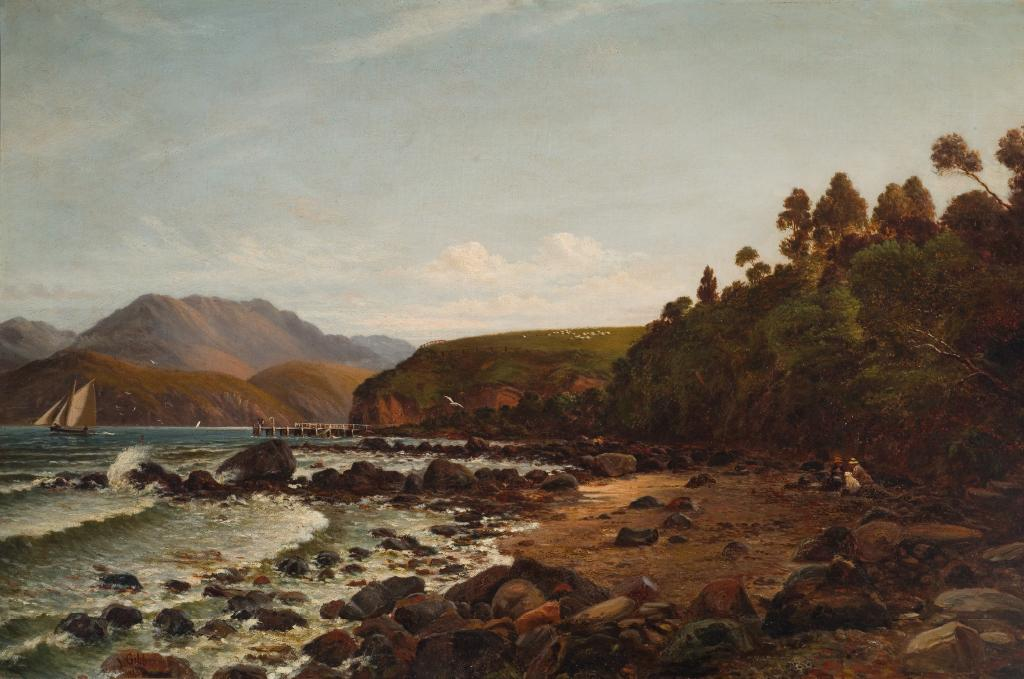
John Gibb, Low tide, Governor's Bay, 1883

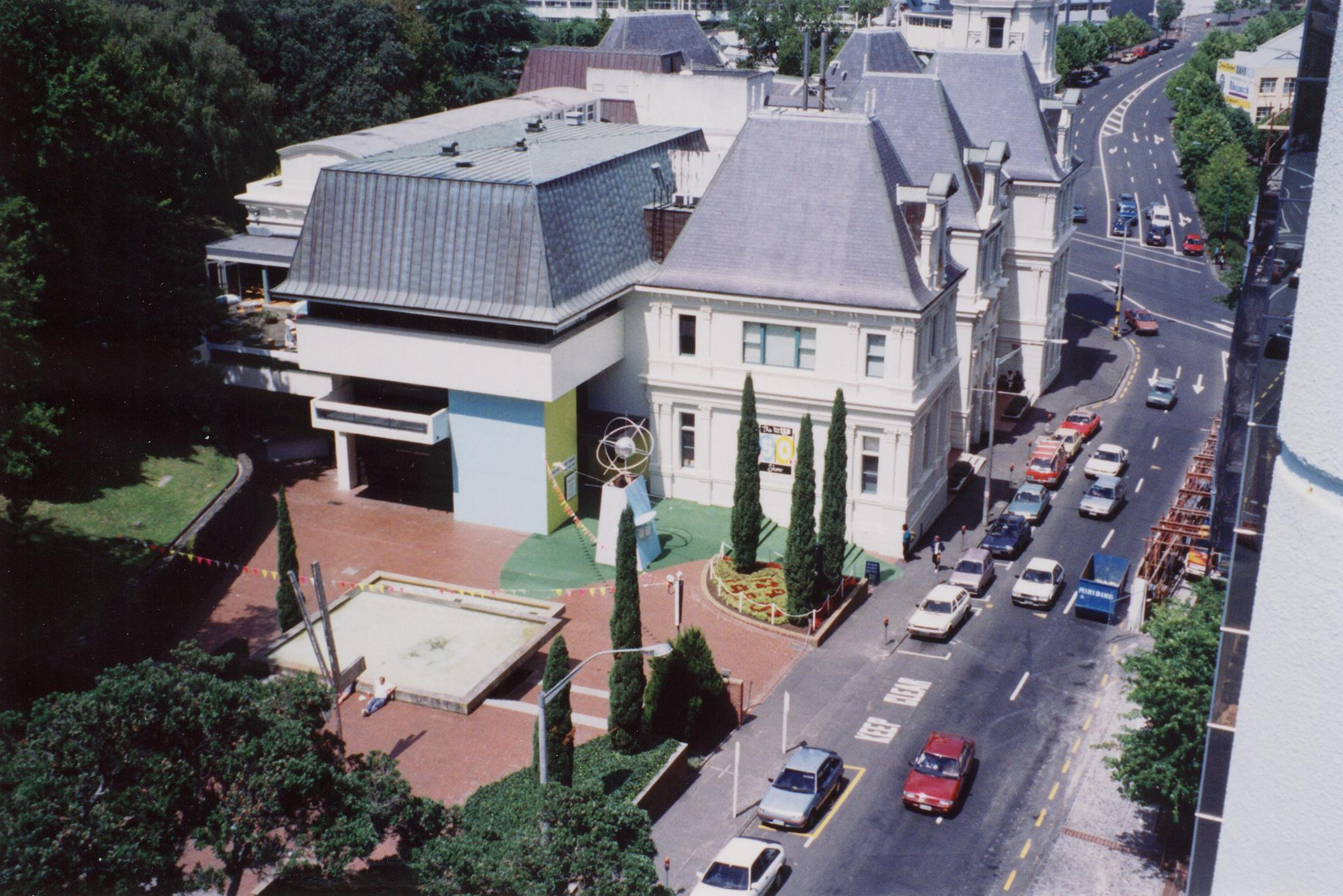
With the extension added in the 1970s, seen from a nearby parking building

The Auckland Gallery collection was initially dominated by European old master paintings following the standard taste of the 19th century. Today the collection has expanded to include a wider variety of periods, styles and media, and numbers over 18,000 artworks. Many New Zealand and Pacific artists are represented, as well as Europe, and material from the Middle Ages to the present day. Notable New Zealand artists with extensive representation include Gretchen Albrecht, Marti Friedlander, C.F. Goldie, Alfred Henry O'Keeffe, Frances Hodgkins, Gottfried Lindauer and Colin McCahon. Some of these works were donated by the artists themselves.

=== Partridge ===
In 1915 a collection of paintings of Māori by Gottfried Lindauer was donated to the Gallery by Henry Partridge, an Auckland businessman. He made the gift on the proviso that the people of Auckland raise 10,000 pounds for the Belgium Relief Fund. The money was raised within a few weeks.

=== Wertheim ===
Another major benefactor was Lucy Carrington Wertheim. Miss Wertheim was an art gallery owner in London and through her support of expatriate artist Frances Hodgkins bestowed on the Auckland Art Gallery a representative collection of British paintings from the interwar period. Her gifts in 1948 and 1950 totalled 154 works by modern British artists, including Christopher Wood, Frances Hodgkins, Phelan Gibb, R. O. Dunlop and Alfred Wallis. The Wertheim collection was initially displayed in a separate room opened by the Mayor J. A. C. Allum on 2 December 1948.

=== Nan Kivell ===
In 1953 Rex Nan Kivell donated an important collection of prints, including work by George French Angas, Sydney Parkinson, Nicholas Chevalier, and Augustus Earle. The 1960s saw the arrival of the Watson Bequest, a collection of European medieval art. In 1967 the Spencer collection of early English and New Zealand watercolours was donated, this included early New Zealand views by John Gully, John Hoyt, and John Kinder. In 1982 on the death of Walter Auburn, print collector and valued adviser to the Gallery's prints and drawings department, the Mackelvie Trust received his magnificent collection of over one and a half thousand prints, including work by Callot, Piranesi, della Bella and Hollar.

=== Chartwell ===
In 1997 the Chartwell Collection, established in 1974 by Hamilton businessman Rob Gardiner, was transferred from the Waikato Museum of Art and History to long-term loan at the Auckland Art Gallery. By 2022 the Chartwell Collection had over 2000 items and was a regular feature in the Auckland Art Gallery's programme along with specific exhibitions of works from the collection and new acquisitions. The Auckland Art Gallery Toi Tamaki have also collaborated in joint purchases including Michael Parekowhai's The Indefinite Article in 1990 and Giovanni Intra's Untilted (Studded Suit) in 2003. Selected Chartwell Collection exhibitions at the Auckland Art Gallery include: The Chartwell Collection: A Selection (1997), Home and Away, Contemporary Australian and New Zealand Art from the Chartwell Collection (1999), Nine Lives: The Chartwell Exhibition (2003), Made Active: The Chartwell Show (2012), Shout, Whisper, Wail (2017) and Walls to Live Inside / Rooms to Own (2023).

=== Dame Jenny Gibbs ===
Initially with her husband Allan, Jenny Gibbs has been a long-time supporter of the gallery's collection and activities including the formation of the Patron's Group who with the Gibbs gifted Colin McCahon's 1974 painting Comet (F8, F9, F10) in 1987.

More recently Dame Jenny Gibbs has marked a number of occasions through gifting including Gordon Walters 1971 painting Genealogy 5 in tribute to the Directorship of Chris Saines in 2022 and No Ordinary Sun by Ralph Hotere in memory of the artist in 2013. She has also gifted other significant paintings by Gordon Walters to the collection including Blue and Yellow 1967.

=== Robertson ===
In 2009, it was announced that American investor Julian Robertson would donate art valued at $115 million to the Auckland Art Gallery. The donation included works by Paul Cézanne, Paul Gauguin, Pablo Picasso, Henri Matisse, Piet Mondrian, Salvador Dalí, Georges Braque, André Derain, Fernand Léger, Pierre Bonnard and Henri Fantin-Latour, and was the largest of its kind in Australasia. Following the donation, the Kitchener Street rooms were named the Julian and Josie Robertson Galleries. On Robertson's death in 2022 the collection became incorporated with the collections of the Auckland Art Gallery and in celebration were shown in full in 2024.

== Google Art Project ==
On 4 April 2012, it was announced that the Auckland Art Gallery would join the Google Art project. "It is a fantastic opportunity to share with the rest of the world some of the best of our New Zealand and international collection", said RFA Gallery Director Chris Saines. "People can learn about and enjoy New Zealand art up close even when they are on the other side of the planet." Auckland Art Gallery has contributed 85 artworks to the project: 56 are from its New Zealand Pacific collection and 29 by international artists. The Gallery's two Senior Curators, Ron Brownson (New Zealand and Pacific Art) and Mary Kisler (Mackelvie Collection, International Art), selected the works. Examples of New Zealand art now available via Google Art Project include Colin McCahon's On Building Bridges (1952) and paintings by Frances Hodgkins.

== Buildings ==
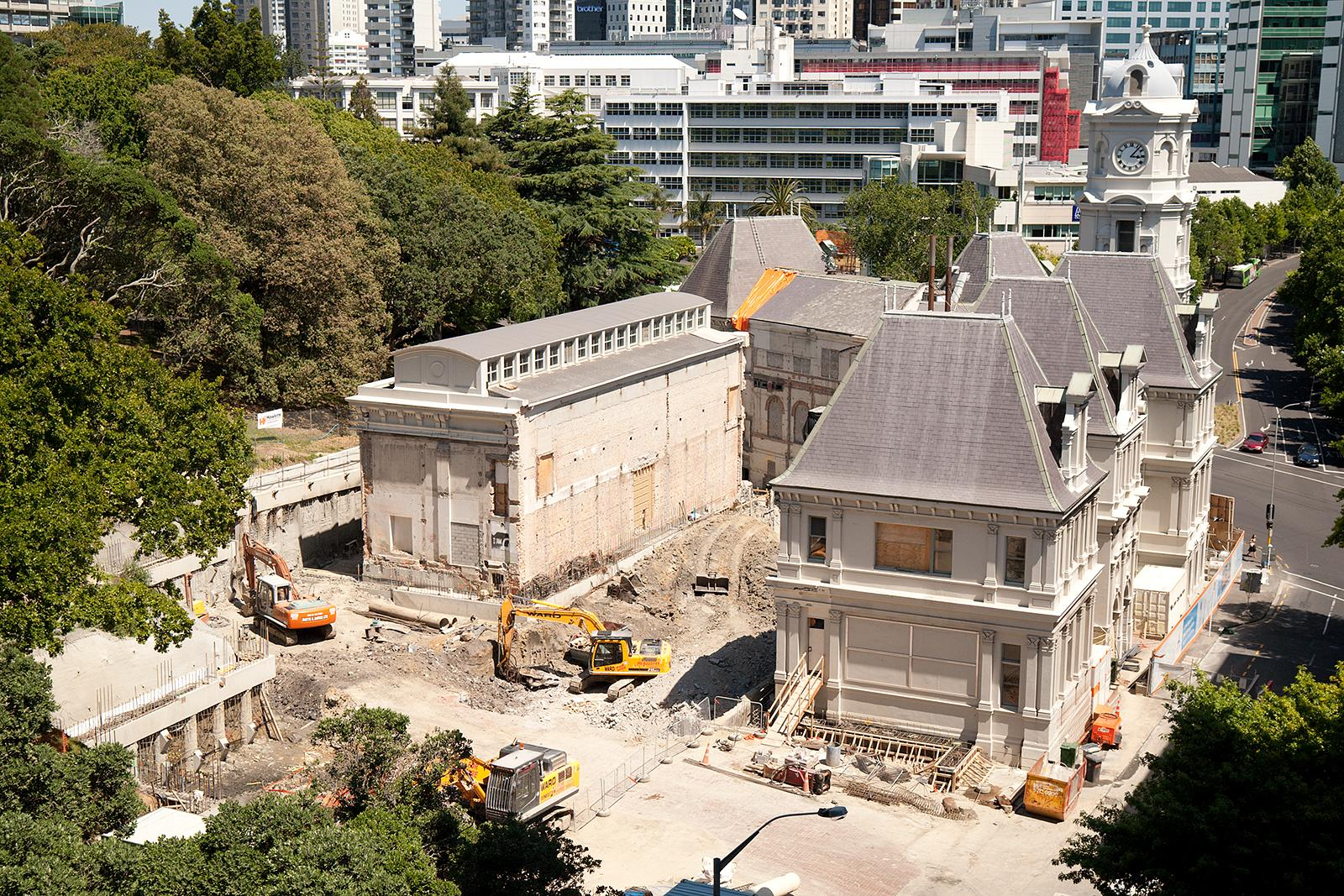
After the demolition of the 1970s extension, in 2009

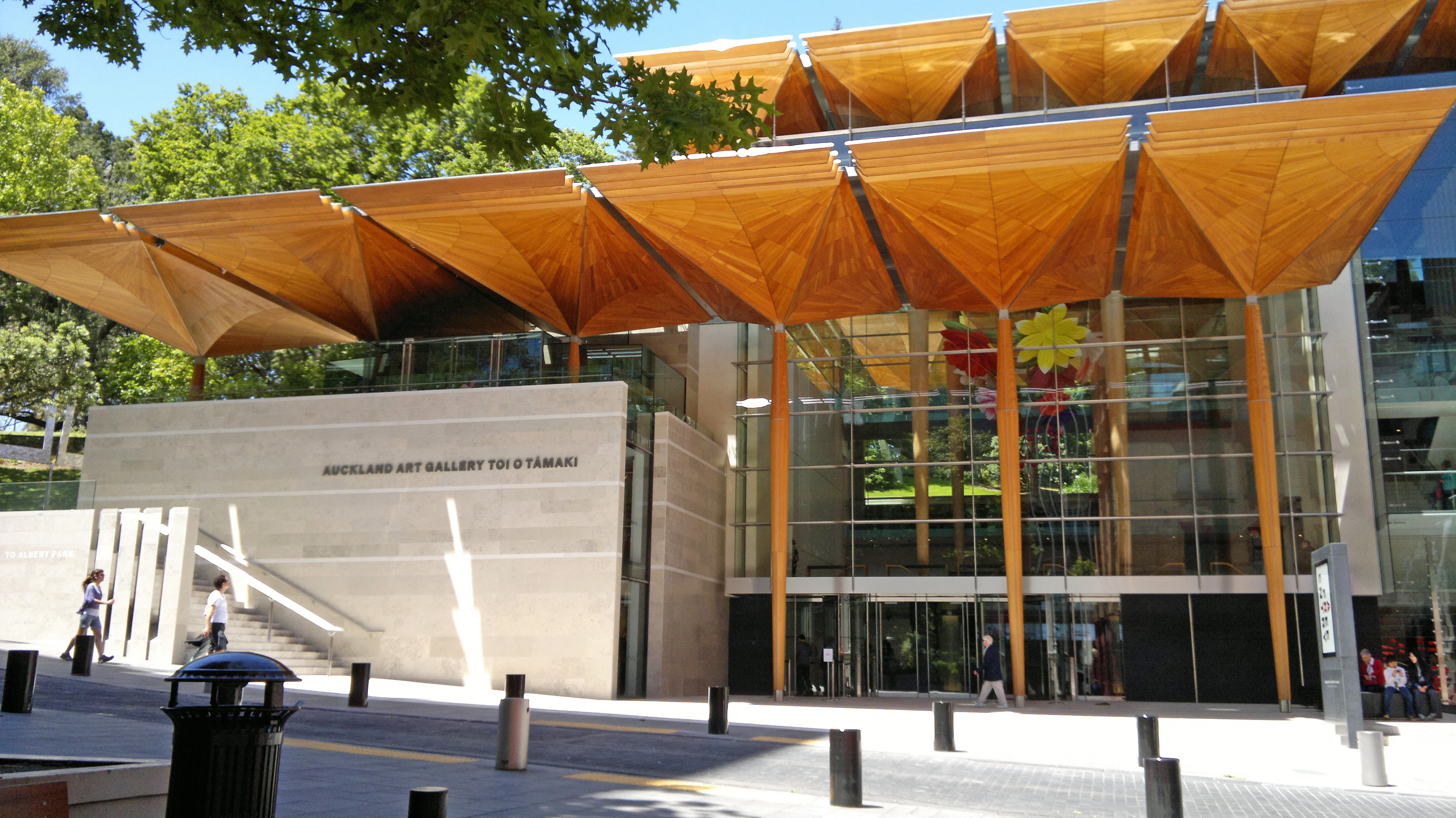
The extension completed in 2011

The main gallery building was originally designed by Melbourne architects Grainger & D'Ebro to house not only the art gallery but also the City Council offices, lecture theatre and public library. It is constructed of brick and plaster in an early French Renaissance style and was completed in 1887, with an extension built in 1916. It is three storeys high, with an attic in the steep pitched roofs, and a six-storey clock tower. The building was registered as a Category I heritage item by Heritage New Zealand on 24 November 1983, listed with registration number 92.

The new building eventually proved too small to house all the Council departments, and overflow space in the Customs House in Customs Street was found to be necessary. Following the completion of the Auckland Town Hall in 1911 all Council departments left the Gallery building, allowing expansion of Gallery facilities, including extra workshop space for art classes. Several artists maintained studio space in the complex during the period just after the war; the weaver Ilse von Randow utilised the clock tower rooms and created onsite the Art Gallery Ceremonial curtains, executed as part of the 1950s modernisation. In 1969 the art classes and studios were relocated to Ponsonby, where a decommissioned Police Station by John Campbell at 1 Ponsonby Road was relaunched as 'Artstation', which continues the gallery outreach programmes.

From 1969 to 1971 the building underwent remodelling and a new wing and sculpture garden were added. This was the result of the lavish Philip Edmiston bequest, which had been announced in 1946 and stipulated the building of a new gallery. In 1971 the public library was moved to the new Auckland Public Library building by Ewen Wainscott in nearby Lorne Street.

In the late 2000s, a major extension was mooted, which drew substantial criticism from some quarters due to its cost, design and the fact that land from Albert Park would be required. The Gallery closed for the extensive renovations and expansion in late 2007, and re-opened on 3 September 2011. During the closure, temporary exhibitions were held at the NEW Gallery on the corner of Wellesley and Lorne Streets.

In 2008, Council decided to go ahead with the extension, which finished in 2011 for a total of NZ$113 million, of which Auckland City Council contributed just under NZ$50 million.

The expansion design by Australian architecture firm FJMT in partnership with Auckland-based Archimedia increased exhibition space by 50%, for up to 900 artworks, and provided dedicated education, child and family spaces. As part of the upgrade, existing parts of the structure were renovated and restored to its 1916 state – amongst other things ensuring that the 17 different floor levels in the building were reduced to just 6. The redevelopment has received 17 architectural and 6 design-related awards, including the World Architecture Festival's 2013 World Building of the Year.

One of the sealed entrances to the Albert Park tunnels can be found behind the Art Gallery on Wellesley Street.

== E H McCormick Research Library ==
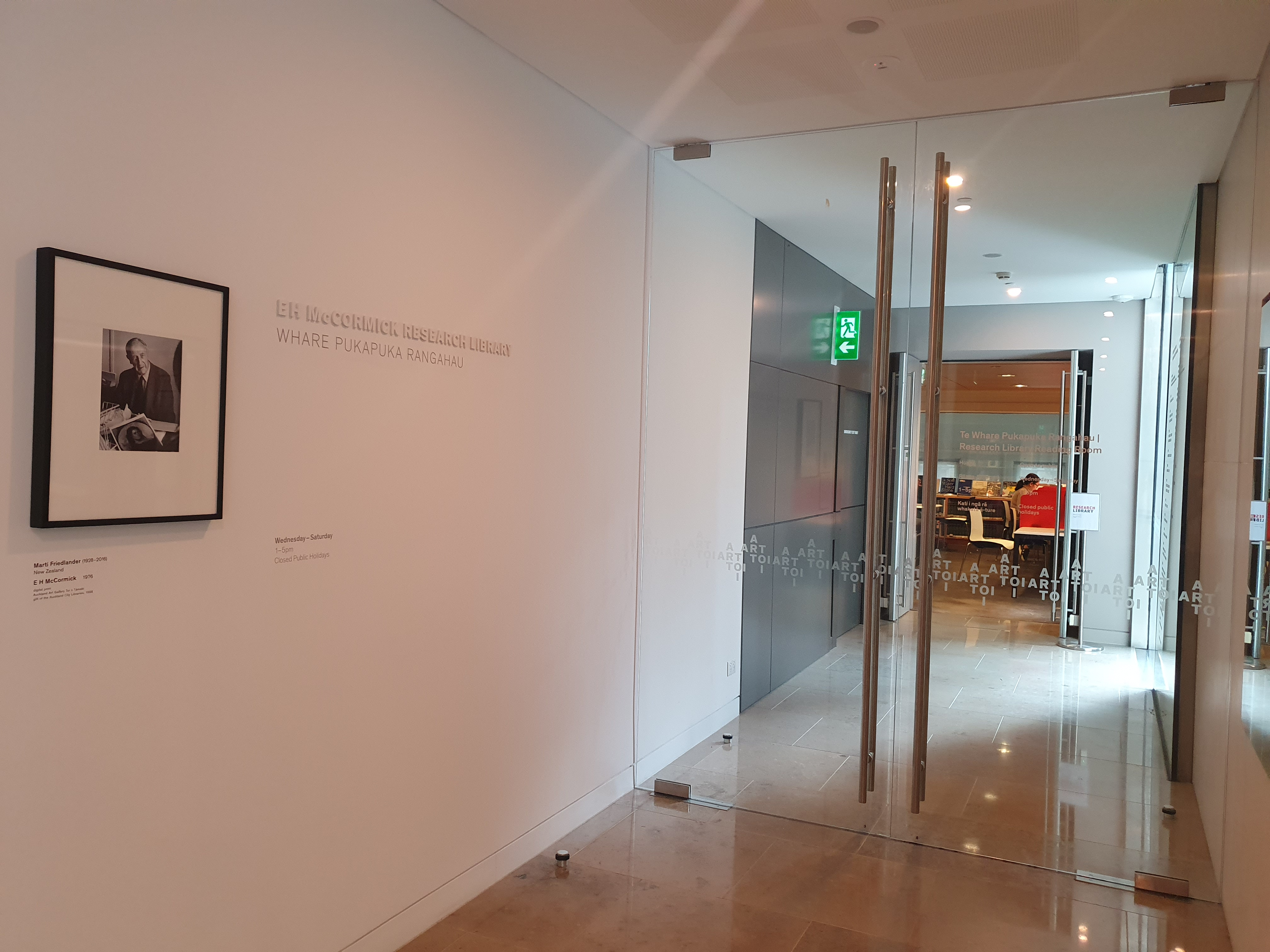
Entrance to the E H McCormick Research Library

The E H McCormick Research Library is a specialist art library located within the Auckland Art Gallery. First established based on a collection donated by the Auckland Society of Arts, the library was first established in October 1953 as a reading room within the gallery. The library holds approximately 160 archival collections, including records for different galleries in New Zealand and personal papers of artists. This includes archives of Jim Allen, Tony Fomison and the Marti Friedlander photographic archive, the latter of which was added to the UNESCO New Zealand Memory of the World Aotearoa New Zealand Ngā Mahara o te Ao register in 2018.

== Directors ==
Although founded in 1888, the Gallery did not employ a professional director until the appointment of Englishman Eric Westbrook in 1952.

He was appointed as the first full-time director of the Art Gallery (previously the Head Librarian was formally in charge of both the Gallery and Library). He was succeeded in 1955 by Peter Tomory who stayed until 1965. Both men sought to revitalise the Gallery and introduce modern art to a largely conservative public in the face of resistance from a largely hostile City Council. The 1956 Spring Exhibition 'Object and Image' showed works by modern artists such as John Weeks, Louise Henderson, Milan Mrkusich, Colin McCahon, Kase Jackson and Ross Fraser. Other controversial exhibitions, including Henry Moore and Barbara Hepworth, resulted in serious confrontation between the Council and Tomory, resulting in his resignation.

Tomory's intended purchase of Hepworth's Torso II in 1963 (likened by one councillor to 'the buttock of a dead cow') changed the climate of art and culture in New Zealand. Even the conservative New Zealand Herald pointed out to its readers, "It is no function of an Art Gallery to be stuffed with exhibits which everyone can comprehend." The bronze statue was privately bought by local businessman George Wooler and anonymously donated to the Gallery.

In 1981 Rodney Wilson was appointed as the Auckland Art Gallery's first New Zealand-born director and, still in 2024 the only New Zealander to hold the position. By the end of his directorship in 1988 the size of the Auckland Art Gallery had doubled and become the venue for a number of blockbuster exhibitions most notably Monet: Painter of Light in 1985 (see exhibition list below). Wilson also headed the team that handled the logistics of touring the exhibition Te Māori to the United States and its subsequent tour of New Zealand as Te Māori-Te Hokinga Mai.

In 1988, Christopher Johnstone succeeded Rodney Wilson as director. During his eight years as director major exhibitions included Pablo Picasso: The artist before nature (1989), Rembrandt to Renoir, which attracted a record attendance for an exhibition charge exhibition of 210,000 (1993) and, in 1995, a programme marking the centennial of the artist's visit to the gallery, including the exhibition Paul Gauguin: Pages from the Pacific and a major book: Gauguin and Maori Art. Other achievements during his incumbency were the funding and development of the New Gallery for contemporary art, which opened in 1995, the establishment of Haerewa, the Maori Advisory Group and a significant range of acquisitions for the collection and the Mackelvie Trust including works by including works by Vanessa Bell, John Nash, John Tunnard, Anish Kapoor, Jesus Rafael Soto and Ed Ruscha.

- 2026-present: Zara Stanhope
- 2019–2025: Kirsten Lacy
- 2013–2018: Rhana Devenport
- 1996–2013: Chris Saines
- 1988–1995: Christopher Johnstone
- 1981–1988: Rodney Wilson
- 1979–1981: Grant Kirby (Acting Director)
- 1974–1979: Professor Ernest Smith
- 1972–1974: Richard Teller Hirsch
- 1965–1972: Gil Docking
- 1956–1965: Professor Peter Tomory
- 1952–1955: Eric Westbrook

== Exhibitions ==
A selection of key exhibitions shown at the Auckland Art Gallery post 1950. Exhibitions developed by other institutions are noted.

- 1954 Frances Hodgkins and Her Circle Curated by E H McCormick on the occasion of the Auckland Festival of the Arts
- 1954 Object and Image Soon after arriving in Auckland to take up a job at the Auckland City Art Gallery, Colin McCahon helps arrange an exhibition of New Zealand artists working in abstraction. The title of this exhibition is taken from his painting of the same name which presents the Shorter Oxford English Dictionary definition of the two key words. McCahon describes the reception of the exhibition as 'causing a bit of concern amongst the masses'.
- 1956 Henry Moore: an Exhibition of Sculpture and Drawings Organised by the British Council for Canada and New Zealand. The exhibition's tour in New Zealand is initiated by Auckland City Art Gallery director Eric Westbrook who knew Henry Moore. Its presentation in New Zealand is arranged by the new director Peter Tomory who predicts that the exhibition is bound to be controversial. The Mayor of Auckland John Luxford is tricked by a freelance journalist into publicly commenting negatively on the exhibition calling it 'a nauseating sight' guaranteeing major media coverage and record attendances of 36,700.^{[6]}
- 1957 Eight New Zealand Painters: Angus, Fife, Holmwood, Mrkusich, Nicholson, Sutton, Thompson, Turner The first of three exhibitions of contemporary New Zealand painters toured through New Zealand by the Auckland City Art Gallery
- 1961 Painting from the Pacific: Japan, America, Australia, New Zealand
- 1963 Retrospective: M.T. Woollaston and Colin McCahon The first large-scale exhibition of work by painters born, trained and living in New Zealand.
- 1966 Fifty Scrolls by Sengai Organised and toured through New Zealand by the Auckland City Art Gallery with assistance from the Queen Elizabeth II Arts Council and the Japanese Society for Cultural Relations
- 1967 Marcel Duchamp, The Mary Sisler Collection: 78 Works 1904 – 1963 Organised by the Auckland City Art Gallery and toured through New Zealand by Queen Elizabeth II Arts Council of New Zealand
- 1969 Frances Hodgkins 1869 – 1947: A Centenary Exhibition
- 1970 Art of the Space Age This exhibition is drawn from the Peter Stuyvesant Art Foundation based in the Netherlands. The exhibition is brought to New Zealand and toured nationally by Rothmans Cultural Foundation (New Zealand) and the Queen Elizabeth II Arts Council of New Zealand
- 1971 Ten Big Paintings In his catalogue introduction Director Gil Docking describes the exhibition as 'an exercise in positive patronage'. The artists selected are Don Driver, Michael Eaton, Robert Ellis, Pat Hanly, Ralph Hotere, Colin McCahon, Milan Mrkusich, Don Peebles, Ross Ritchie, and Wong Sing Tai. The Gallery prepares and delivers the large stretched canvases of the same standard size and arranges for their transport back to the Gallery when complete. The exhibition is part of the celebrations for the opening the new Edmiston Wing.
- 1972 Colin McCahon: A Survey exhibition
- 1975 Van Gogh in Auckland
- 1975 - 1978 Project Programme 1: John Lethbridge: Formal Enema Enigma The first in a series of 15 Auckland City Art Gallery exhibitions looking at recent conceptual and contemporary art in New Zealand
- 1977 The Two Worlds of Omai
- 1980 Len Lye: A Personal Mythology Curated by Andrew Bogle
- 1983 - 1984 Aspects of Recent New Zealand Art: New Image Curated by Francis Pound and Andrew Bogle, this is the first in a series of three exhibitions. The following two are Aspects of Recent New Zealand Art: The Grid, Lattice and Network curated by Andrew Bogle and Aspects of Recent New Zealand Art: Anxious Images curated by Alexa M. Johnston
- 1983 Gordon Walters Curated by Michael Dunn
- 1985 Claude Monet: Painter of Light Curated by the director Rodney Wilson who visits 23 art museums worldwide to negotiate the loans of the 36 paintings. The funding of the exhibition relies on a private public partnership with the insurance company NZI and is one of the most successful exhibitions shown at the Auckland City Art Gallery. The previous record attendance was 67,000 for Van Gogh in Auckland held in 1975. While Wilson hopes for around 80,000 visitors for Claude Monet, the first two weeks alone see 43,000 visitors with long queues along Welesley Street. The total attendance is 175,679 A National Research Bureau survey finds that one third of the visitors have never been in the Auckland City Art Gallery before and that 43 percent of them come from outside Auckland.
- 1985 Chance and Change: A Century of the Avant-Garde Curated by Andrew Bogle
- 1987 Te Māori presented in New Zealand as Te Māori-Te Hokinga Mai
- 1988 Immendorff: Foreign Artist Project
- 1988 Colin McCahon: Gates and Journeys The Auckland City Art Gallery's centenary exhibition curated by Alexa M Johnston
- 1989 After McCahon: Some Configurations in Recent Art Curated by Christina Barton
- 1995 Paul Gauguin: Pages from the Pacific Curated by Douglas Druick & Peter Zegers
- 1999 Stories We Tell Ourselves: The Paintings of Richard Killeen Curated by Francis Pound
- 2001 1st Auckland Triennial: Bright Paradise: Exotic History and Sublime Artifice The first in a series of five triennial exhibitions. Curated by Allan Smith
- 2002 The Walters Prize 2002 The first of an on-going series of biennial exhibitions profiling contemporary New Zealand art. It is named after painter Gordon Walters (1919-1995)
- 2005 Mixed-Up Childhood Curated by Janita Craw and Robert Leonard
- 2014 Modern Paints Aotearoa Examined how paint affected the work of New Zealand artists, the exhibition included Colin McCahon's Northland Panels, on show at the Gallery for the first time in 25 years.
- 2015 Billy Apple ®: The Artist Has to Live Like Everybody Else. Curated by Christina Barton and accompanied by the publication Billy Apple® : a life in parts
- 2015 Lisa Reihana: in Pursuit of Venus [infected] Curated by Rhana Devenport
- 2015 Necessary Distraction: A Painting Show Curated by Natasha Conland
- 2017 Time: Connecting Past and Future, 18 June 2016 – 26 November
- 2017 History Sees Division, 18 June 2016 – 26 November
- 2017 The Subject in the Land, 18 June 2016 – 26 November
- 2017 X Marks the Spot: Histories Negotiated, 27 August 2016 – 2 July
- 2017 The Body Laid Bare: Masterpieces from Tate, 18 March 2017 – 16 July
- 2018 The Māori Portraits: Gottfried Lindauer's New Zealand: Te Hokinga Mai Curated by Ngahiraka Mason and Nigel Borell
- 2018 Gordon Walters: New Vision A joint exhibition with the Dunedin Public Art Gallery
- 2019 Louise Henderson: From Life Curated by Felicity Milburn, Lara Strongman and Julia Waite
- 2020 Toi Tū Toi Ora: Contemporary Māori Art Curated by Nigel Borell (Pirirākau, Ngāi Te Rangi, Ngāti Ranginui, Te Whakatōhea) this exhibition of more than 300 artworks by 110 Māori artists occupies the entire Auckland Art Gallery. Embedded in a Māori world view, the exhibition develops themes of time and creation starting with the opening galleries representing Te Kore: the void. Toi Tū Toi Ora attracts over 191,000 visitors with Māori visitation increased from 4 per cent to 15 per cent.

The E.H. McCormick Research Library maintains a complete exhibitions list from June 1927.
