= Peter Tomory =

British art historian, museum curator and academic

- Born: 3 January 1922; Hong Kong
- Died: 25 March 2008 (aged 86); Rhayader, Powys, Wales

Academic work
- Discipline: Art history
- Institutions: York Art Gallery; Auckland City Art Gallery; University of Auckland; Columbia University; Hunter College; John and Mable Ringling Museum of Art; La Trobe University

Peter Alexander Tomory (3 January 1922 – 25 March 2008) was a British art historian, museum curator and director.

== Biography ==
Tomory was born in Hong Kong and educated in India and the UK. In 1940 he joined the Royal Navy and served for five and a half years, including patrols on the Murmansk run. After the War he undertook postgraduate study at University of Edinburgh.

In 1950 he was appointed Assistant Curator of York Art Gallery under Hans Hess. In 1951 he curated the gallery's contribution to the 1951 Festival of Britain, titled "Masterpieces from Yorkshire Houses". He was appointed director of the Auckland City Art Gallery, where he worked from 1956–65; an archive of his research, lecture notes and diaries from his time there is retained by the museum.

Tomory worked with Colin McCahon in the gallery to promote the institutional focus of the gallery towards historical and contemporary New Zealand art. He also founded a research journal in the gallery, the Gallery Quarterly. The Auckland Art Gallery acquired 124 prints from Tomory's private collection in 2004.

He left the art gallery in 1964 to take up a post in the newly formed Art History department of the University of Auckland. He left that post to teach at Columbia University and Hunter College. He also worked as the Senior Curator of Baroque Art at the John and Mable Ringling Museum of Art.

In 1972 he was appointed Professor of the History of Art at La Trobe University where he worked for fifteen years. He was appointed a Fellow of the Australian Academy of the Humanities in 1974 and served on its council from 1984 to 1986. He was also a founding member of the Art Association of Australia.

In 1987 he retired and returned to the UK.

== Select publications ==
- 1979. (with J H Füssli). The poetical circle: Fuseli and the British
- 1989. (with Robert Gaston) European paintings before 1800: in Australian and New Zealand public collections
- 1997. (with Anne Kirker). British Painting 1800–1990 in Australian and New Zealand Collections. Sydney, Beagle Press.
