= Darcy Lange =

New Zealand artist

Darcy Bruce Espie Lange (22 September 1946 – 8 August 2005) was a New Zealand artist born in Urenui. Lange studied at the Elam School of Fine Arts (1964–1967) creating hard-edge abstract sculptures before studying at the Royal College of Art in London and shifting his focus to moving image and photography.

== Career ==
Beginning in the United Kingdom in the 1970s, Lange pioneered a social documentary practice with video, filming people in working environments such as schools, factories and farms. Among this work, Work Studies in Schools (1976–1977) has won significant attention. Beginning in Birmingham, Lange videotaped a number of school lessons across three schools, each representing a different social class. The recordings were watched by Lange with the teachers and the students for commentary, and on occasion recorded again. Lange continued in 1977 across four Oxfordshire schools.

Lange returned to New Zealand in 1974, continuing his practice documenting working lives and, notably, Māori activism through the Maori Land Project (1977–1981). Working closely with photographer John Miller, Lange documented the conflict between Māori and the New Zealand government around the Ngāti Hine Block and Bastion Point land cases.

In 1979, Lange moved to the Netherlands and worked with René Coelho to produce a programme for Nederlandse Omroep Stichting based on the Maori Land Project followed by a collaboration with the University of Utrecht titled The Maori Land Struggle. He subsequently contributed to the exhibition The Land of the Maori exhibition at the Van Abbemuseum in 1980.

Lange died in Auckland in 2005

In 2006, Mercedes Vicente curated the first retrospective of Lange's work at the Govett-Brewster Art Gallery in New Plymouth, New Zealand.

== Solo exhibitions ==
- 2018 Landa Lan: A Documentation of Darcy Lange, San Sebastián, Tabakalera
- 2016 Darcy Lange: Enduring Time, Tate Modern, London
- 2010 Darcy Lange, Camera Austria, Graz, Austria
- 2010 Work Studies in Schools, Slought, Philadelphia
- 2008 Work Studies in Schools, Ikon Gallery, Birmingham
- 2007 Darcy Lange: Study of an Artist at Work, Adam Art Gallery, Wellington
- 2006 Darcy Lange: Study of an Artist at Work, Govett-Brewster Art Gallery, New Plymouth
- 1999 The Māori Land Project, Auckland War Memorial Museum, Auckland
- 1977 A Documentation of Bradford Working Life, Institute of Contemporary Art, London
- 1977 Work Studies in Schools, Museum of Modern Art, Oxford
- 1971 Darcy Lange, Ikon Gallery, Birmingham

== Group exhibitions ==
- 2019 The Future of Work, The Dowse Art Museum, Lower Hutt, New Zealand
- 2003 A Century of Artists' Film in Britain, Tate Britain, London
- 1998 Action Replay: Post-Object New Zealand Art, Artspace, Auckland; Govett-Brewster Art Gallery, New Plymouth; Auckland City Art Gallery, Auckland
- 1992 Art and Organized Labour, City Art Gallery, Wellington

== Publications ==
- Vicente, Mercedes, Darcy Lange, Videography as Social Practice, London, Springer Nature, 2023.
- Darcy Lange: Study of an Artist at Work, New Plymouth and Birmingham: Govett-Brewster Art Gallery and Ikon Art Gallery, 2008.
- Darcy Lange: Video Art, Auckland, The Department of Film, Television and Media Studies, University of Auckland, 2001.

== Collections ==
- Museum of New Zealand Te Papa Tongarewa
- Govett-Brewster Art Gallery
- Ngā Taonga: Sound and Vision
