= Heather Galbraith =

New Zealand fine art curator and academic

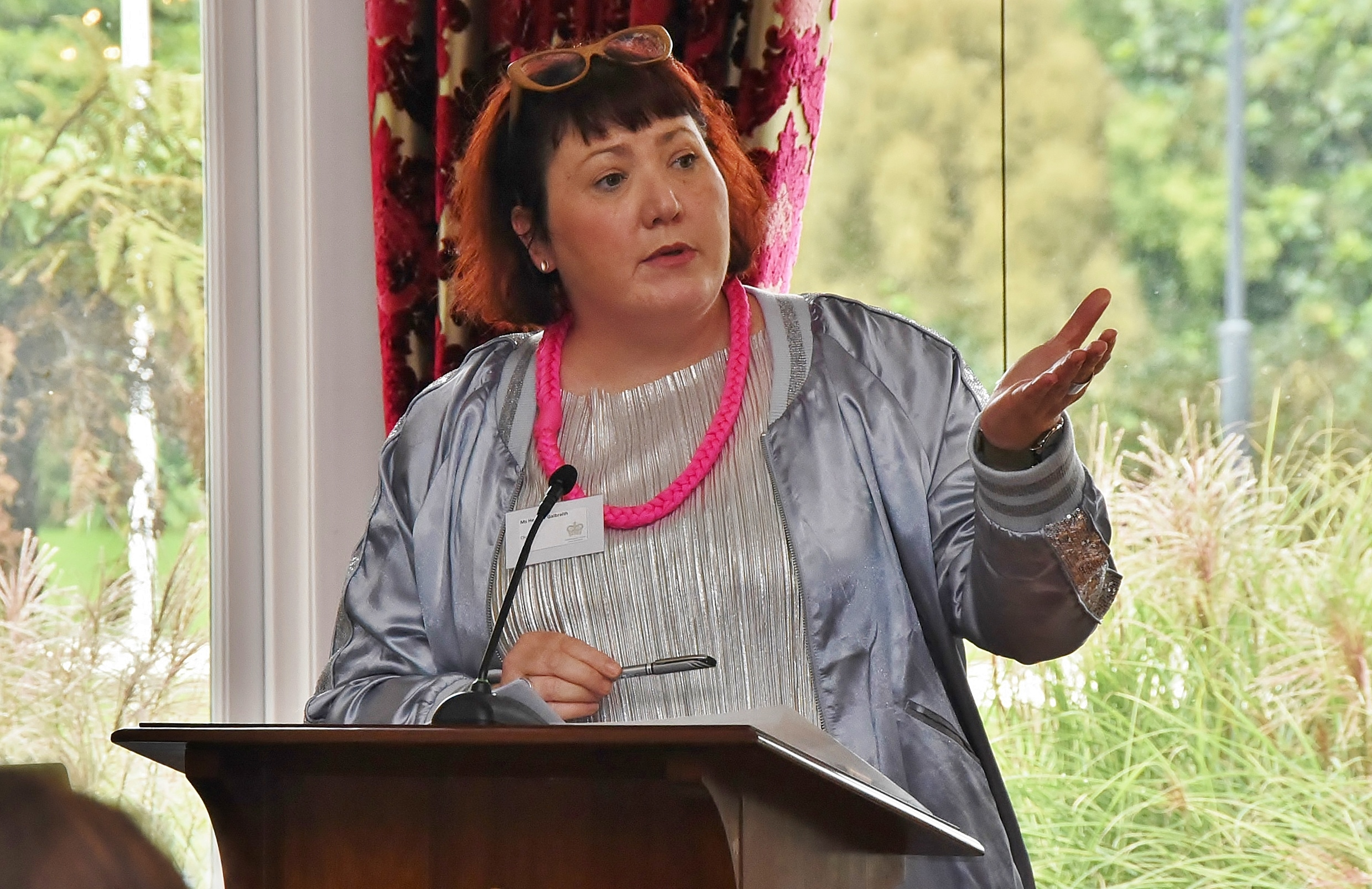
- Galbraith at the Venice Biennale Youth Forum in 2017
- Education: Goldsmiths, University of London
- Scientific career
- Workplaces: Massey University

Heather Galbraith is a New Zealand fine art curator and academic. As of 2018 she is a full professor at Massey University in Wellington.

== Academic career ==
After a MA from Goldsmiths, University of London, Galbraith worked at City Gallery Wellington and Te Papa before moving to the Massey University, rising to full professor.

She co-curated Francis Upritchard 's New Zealand contribution and deputy commissioner at the 2009 Venice Biennale, was deputy commissioner again in 2013 and commissioner in 2015.

Galbraith is Managing Curator at SCAPE Public Art in Christchurch.
