= Govett-Brewster Art Gallery =

Art museum in New Plymouth, New Zealand

Coordinates: 39°3′31″S 174°4′11″E

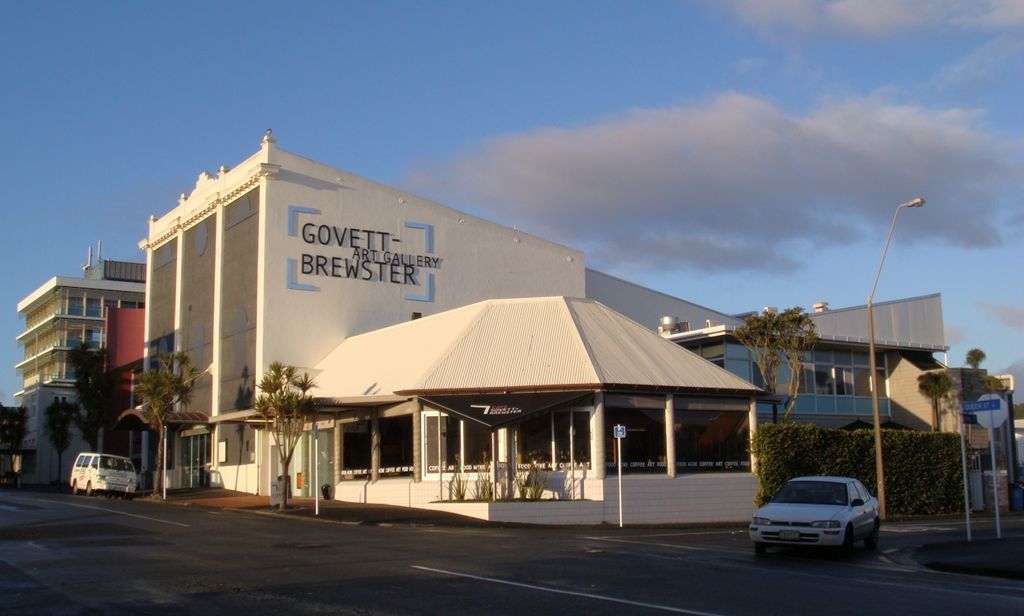

The Govett-Brewster Art Gallery is a contemporary art museum at New Plymouth, Taranaki, New Zealand. The gallery receives core funding from the New Plymouth District Council. Govett-Brewster is recognised internationally for contemporary art.

== History ==
The Govett-Brewster Art Gallery had its beginnings through a gift by New Plymouth resident Monica Brewster (nee Govett 1886–1973) who transferred £50,000 in stocks, funds, shares and securities to the City of New Plymouth in 1962. The fund was to establish and develop a public art gallery (in 1970, the year the gallery eventually opened, she would make a second bequest for £72,000 to start a permanent art collection).

In 1967 a 24 year old Australian teacher John Maynard arrived in New Plymouth having been appointed director to develop a contemporary art gallery. Maynard had no interest in setting up a conventional local body gallery and after touring the country saw that, "artists are where the action is."

Maynard oversaw the Regent cinema building conversion by New Plymouth architect, Terry Boon and developed the collection policy that focused on new forms of art and sculpture fostering the development of artists from New Zealand and the Pacific Rim and allowed for the deaccessioning of unwanted items. The gallery opened on 22 February 1970 with the exhibition Real Time by Leon Narbey. Art critic Hamish Keith described the installation as, 'setting New Zealand art off to the kind of start it should have in the Seventies…Real Time has as its basic mechanism real life, and that itself is a major breakthrough.'

== 1998 extension ==
The gallery opened an extension designed by New Plymouth firm Boon Cox Goldsmith Jackson in 1998. The extension was principally undertaken to provide exhibition and storage space for the Len Lye Foundation Collection along with a dedicated education space.

== Len Lye Centre ==
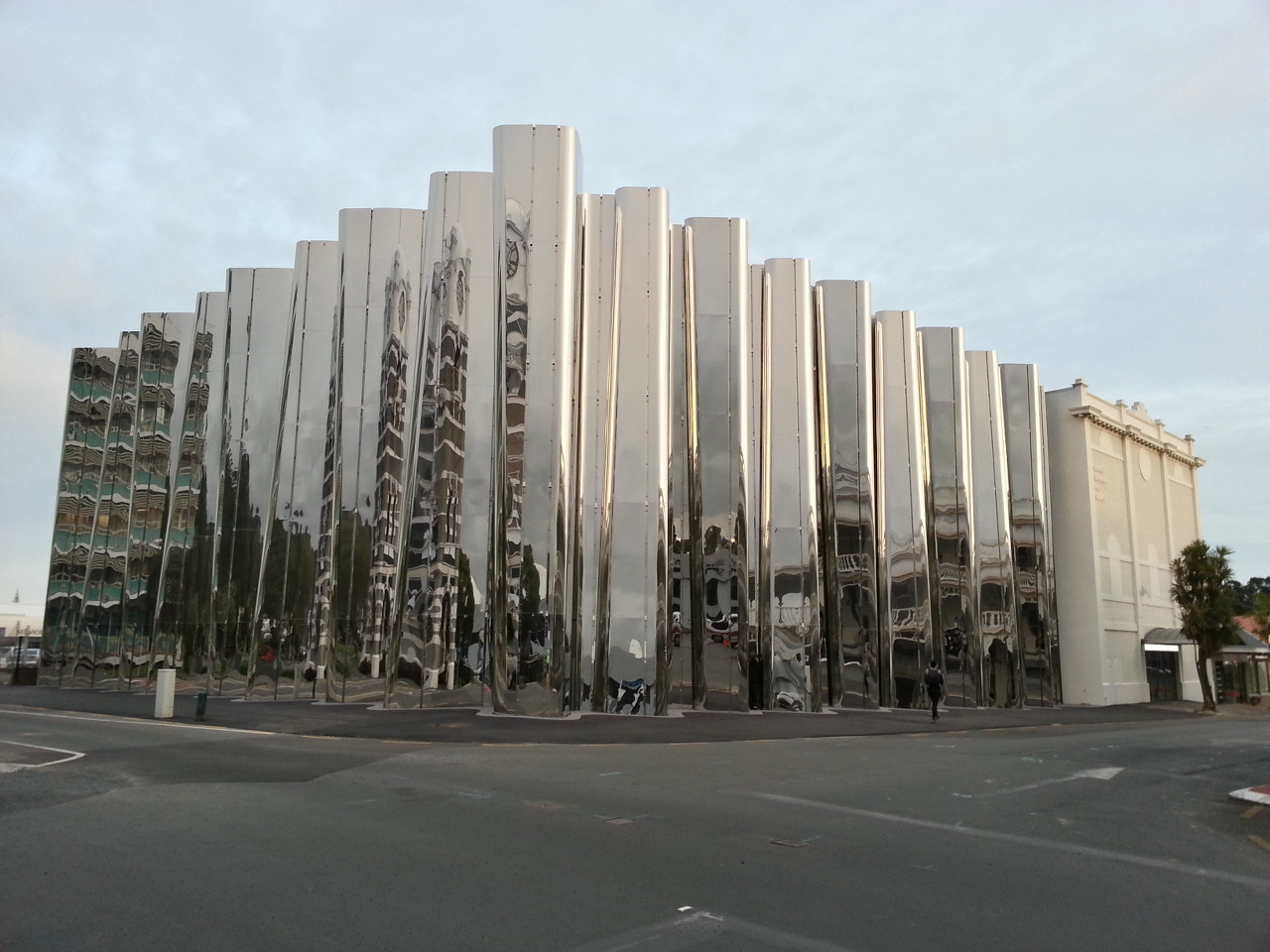
Len Lye Centre, New Plymouth

The Len Lye Centre is an extension to the Govett-Brewster, built to display the works of Len Lye. It was designed by Andrew Patterson of Pattersons Associates, New Zealand. It is home to the archives and studio collection of the Len Lye Foundation. Born in Christchurch in 1901 and largely self-educated, Len Lye was driven by a lifelong passion for motion, energy and the possibility of composing them as a form of art. Lye's interests took him far from New Zealand; after sojourns in the South Pacific, Lye moved to London and then New York, where he became known as an intensely creative film-maker and kinetic sculptor.

The Len Lye Centre was opened on 25 July 2015. This is the first gallery in New Zealand to be dedicated to a single artist.

== Awards ==
The Govett-Brewster Art Gallery has received many awards.

- 2009, the Arts Foundation of New Zealand, Governor's Award
- 2011, the Big ‘A’ Creative New Zealand Arts for All Award
- 2016, Designers Institute of New Zealand, Best Design Award, Large Brand Identity

== Directors ==
- John Maynard, director (1967–1971)
- Robert Ballard, director (1971–1975)
- Ron O'Reilly, director (1975–1979)
- Dick Bett, director (1979–1984)
- Cheryll Sotheran, director (1984–1989)
- John McCormack, director (1990–1993)
- Priscilla Pitts, director (1993–1998)
- Gregory Burke, director (1998–2005)
- Rhana Devenport, director (2006–2013)
- Simon Rees, director (2014–2018)
- Aileen Burns and Johan Lundh, directors (2019–2020)
- Zara Stanhope, director (2021 - 2026)
- Megan Dunn, director (2026 - )

== Exhibitions ==
The Govett-Brewster has produced a number of notable or landmark exhibitions:

- Brett Graham: Tai Moana Tai Tangata (2020, curated by Anna-Marie White)
- Emanations: The Art of the Cameraless Photograph (2016, curated by Geoffrey Batchen)
- Sister Corita's Summer of Love (2015, curated by Simon Rees)
- Vincent Ward: Breath - the fleeting intensity of life (2011, curated by Rhana Devenport)
- Peter Robinson: Snow Ball Blind Time (2008, curated by Rhana Devenport)
- Activating Korea: Tides of Collective Action (2007, curated by Mercedes Vicente and Beck Jee-sook)
- Mediarena: contemporary art from Japan (2004, curated by Gregory Burke, Roger McDonald and Fumio Nanjo)
- Fiona Clark: Go Girl (2002, curated by Gregory Burke)
- Te Maunga Taranaki: views of a mountain (2001, curated by William McAloon)
- Putting the Land on the Map: Art and Cartography in New Zealand since 1840 (1990, curated by Wystan Curnow)
- Leon Narbey: Real Time (1970)

== Publications ==
The Govett-Brewster has produced publications to accompany many of its exhibitions alongside stand-alone texts.

In 2016 the Govett-Brewster published Now Showing: A History of the Govett-Brewster Art Gallery outlining 45 years of exhibition making at the gallery. The publication was edited by Christina Barton, Jonathan Bywater and Wystan Curnow with essays by Barton, Curnow, Jim and Mary Barr, Rhana Devenport, and a foreword by then director, Simon Rees. Now Showing also included ‘Forty Five Moments’, a selection of illustrated highlights from the previous 45 years of gallery activities with accompanying texts by Paul Brobbel, Tyler Cann, Susette Goldsmith, Simon Rees and Mercedes Vicente.

Other notable releases include:

- Erika Balsom – An Oceanic Feeling: Cinema and the Sea (2018)
- Len Lye and Robert Graves – Individual Happiness Now (2017)
- Len Lye: Shadowgraphs (2016, ed. Paul Brobbel)
- Sister Corita's Summer of Love (2016, co-published with City Gallery Wellington, ed. Robert Leonard & Simon Rees)
- Set in Motion: Rebecca Baumann, Žilvinas Kempinas, Len Lye, Taree Mackenzie, Ross Manning (2016, ed. Sarah Wall)
- Maddie Leach: If you find the good oil let us know (2014, ed. Mercedes Vicente)
- Groundworks: Bill Culbert (2013, ed. Rhana Devenport)
- Points of Contact: Jim Allen, Len Lye, Hélio Oiticica (2012, published with Adam Art Gallery, ed. Christina Barton and Tyler Cann, Mercedes Vicente)
- Laurence Aberhart: Recent Taranaki Photographs (2011, ed. Paul Brobbel & Rhana Devenport)
- Len Lye (2009, co-published with the Len Lye Foundation, eds. Tyler Cann and Wystan Curnow)
- Darcy Lange: Study of an Artist At Work (2008, co-published with Ikon Gallery, ed. Mercedes Vicente)
- Pae White: Ghost Towns (2003, ed. Greg Burke)
- Te Maunga Taranaki (2001, ed. Susette Goldsmith)
- With Spirit: Don Driver (1999, ed. Greg Burke)

== See also ==
- Puke Ariki
