= Gregory Burke (curator) =

Canadian museum director, writer and curator (born 1957)

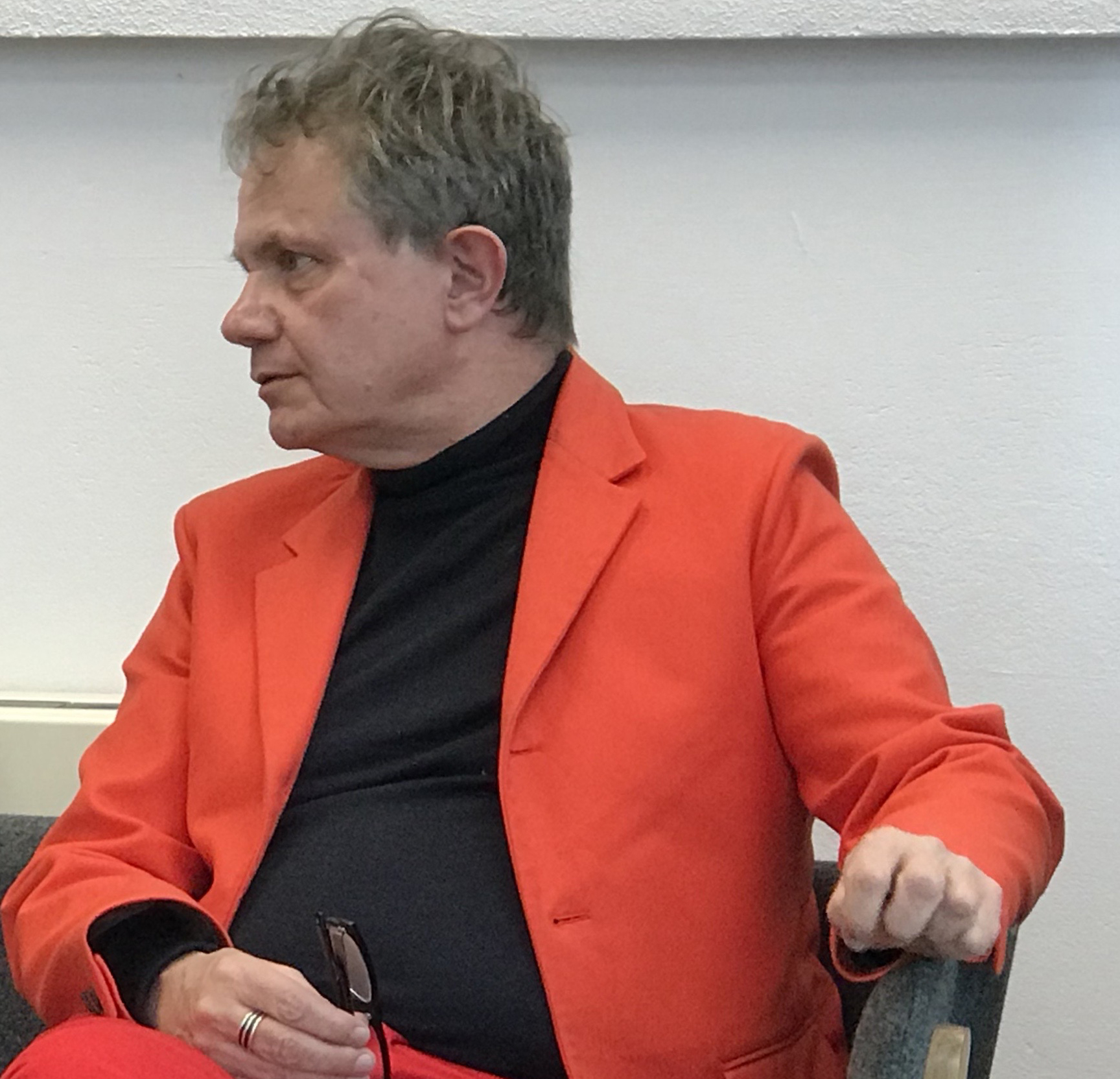
- Gregory Burke 2018
- Born: 1957 (age 68–69)
- Notable work: Director New Plymouth's Govett-Brewster Art Gallery, Power Plant in Toronto and Remai Modern Art Gallery of Saskatchewan

Gregory Burke (born 1957) is a New Zealand museum director, writer and curator. In 2013, he was named executive director & CEO of the Mendel Art Gallery, Saskatoon, Canada and the Remai Modern Art Gallery of Saskatchewan.

== Career ==
Burke was the director of director of the Govett-Brewster Art Gallery, New Plymouth, New Zealand from 1998 to 2005 and Director of The Power Plant, Toronto, Ontario from 2005 to 2011. and He has published over 100 texts and curated over 90 exhibitions since the late 1980s, including solo exhibitions for artists Michael Snow, Rosemarie Trockel, Thomas Hirschhorn, Lawrence Weiner, Ian Wallace, Christopher Williams, Goldin+Senneby, Pae White, Sam Durant, Simon Starling, Candice Breitz, Scott Lyall, Derek Sullivan and Len Lye. Burke has organized major exhibitions of Asian art, such as Mediarena: Contemporary Art from Japan (2004) and Transindonesia (2005). In 2009, he curated Universal Code: Art and Cosmology in the Information Age (2009), which won the Ontario Association of Art Galleries’s "Exhibition of the Year" award.

Burke curated his native New Zealand’s inaugural pavilion at the Venice Biennale in 2001, and was the New Zealand Commissioner in 2005. He was a curator for the SITE Santa Fe International Biennial in 2008. In 2014, Burke co-curated (with Peggy Gale) La Biennale de Montréal BNLMTL 2014, "Lʼavenir (looking forward)," co-produced with Musée d'art contemporain de Montréal.

Burke has written for Art + Text, ArtAsiaPacific, Artforum and Art & Australia. He is on the board of directors of Art Metropole, the editorial advisory committee for ARTAND Australia, and is a member of CIMAM (ICOM Committee of International Museums and Collections of Modern and Contemporary Art).

Burke announced the Mendel Art Gallery would close on June 7, 2015 for the transition to the C$80 million Remai Modern Art Gallery of Saskatchewan, which opened in October 2017.

In 2018 Burke resigned from the Remai Modern to act as an independent curator and advisor
