= Lara Strongman =

New Zealand curator, artistic director, writer, art historian

Lara Strongman is a curator, writer and art historian from New Zealand.

== Biography ==
Strongman studied art history at the University of Canterbury, graduating with a master of art's degree in 1991, with a thesis on Tony Fomison. In 2013 she completed a PhD in art history, with a thesis on Colin McCahon, at Victoria University of Wellington.

Strongman held the position of deputy director to Paula Savage at City Gallery Wellington until her appointment as senior curator at Christchurch Art Gallery Te Puna o Waiwhetu in 2014. In 2019 she was appointed director of curatorial and digital at the Museum of Contemporary Art, Sydney.
