= Jesmonite =

Composite of gypsum in an acrylic resin

- Material type: Composite material – mineral-based powder and water-based acrylic resin
- Invented by Peter Hawkins in the UK (1984)

Jesmonite is a composite material consisting of a mineral-based powder combined with a water-based acrylic resin. Developed in 1984, in the United Kingdom, by Peter Hawkins. Jesmonite is widely used as a versatile, durable, and environmentally friendly alternative to traditional plaster and resin-based materials. It is popular in fine arts, architecture, film, and restoration due to its ease of use, aesthetic versatility, and low toxicity.

== Composition and properties ==
Jesmonite combines mineral powders, primarily gypsum or similar compounds, with a water-based acrylic polymer emulsion to produce a strong composite that cures to resemble natural stone or plaster. The cured material offers excellent durability, impact resistance, and fire retardance. Its water-based formulation results in low volatile organic compound (VOC) emissions, making it safer for users compared to solvent-based resins.

Jesmonite accepts pigments and additives such as metal powders to create a variety of surface finishes and colors, and it can be cast, poured, laminated, or sculpted.

== Applications ==
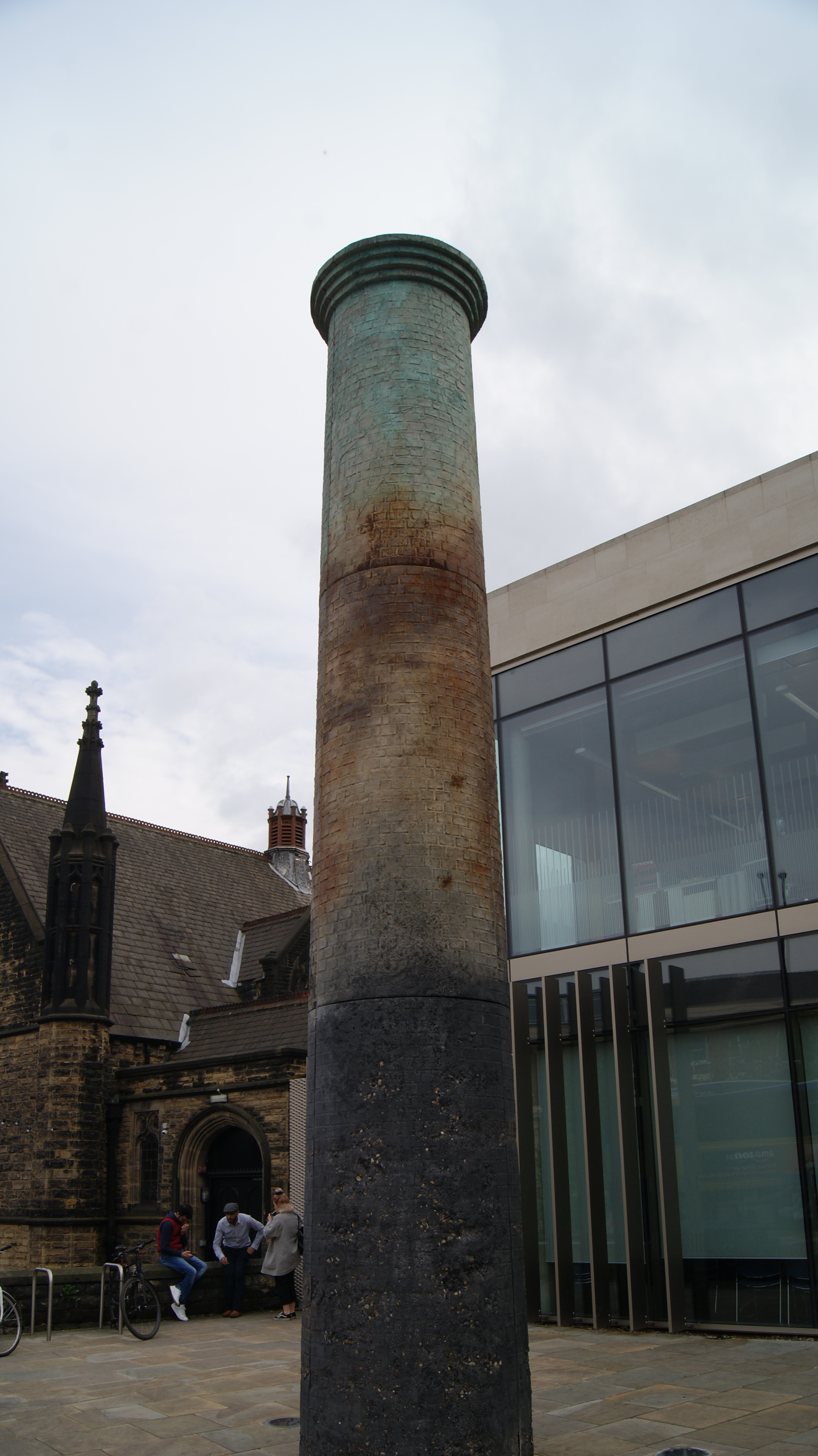
Simon Fujiwara's A Spire (2015), in cast Jesmonite, at the University of Leeds

Jesmonite is widely used across different fields:

- Fine arts and sculpture: Artists use Jesmonite for casting detailed sculptures and lightweight, durable art pieces.
- Architectural moldings: Used to make decorative features such as cornices, panels, and ceiling roses as an alternative to heavier plaster or stone.
- Set and prop design: Ideal for lightweight, textured objects.

== Manufacturing ==
Jesmonite consists primarily of two components: a mineral-based powder (usually gypsum or a related material) and a water-based acrylic polymer emulsion. When combined, they create a composite material that cures into a solid with the appearance and texture of natural stone or plaster but with added durability and flexibility.

== Usage ==
Jesmonite is a versatile material and is used in several ways. It is typically used for creating sculptures and other three-dimensional works, but can be used with other materials as a ground for painting. It can be used as a surface material in building and construction. It is considered an attractive alternative to other resin-based materials, such as polyester and fiberglass. It can be used for casting and laminating. It is more environmentally friendly than some alternatives.

Besides its popularity in sculpture, Jesmonite is popular in other areas where casting and moulding are common, such as architectural stone and plasterwork that has a requirement to be very lightweight, taxidermy, archaeology, and palaeontology.

A 2016 Financial Times article described Jesmonite's increasing use in interior design, seeing it as a natural-looking alternative to plastic for "high-end" goods. In 2017, jesmonite was named "Material of the Year" by the London Design Fair.

== Properties ==
Jesmonite is considered durable, flame-resistant, and resistant to impact. It can be used to fabricate both small and large objects. When mixed, it accepts coloured pigments and metal powders. Its surface can be finished to resemble plaster, stone, metal, and wood.

Jesmonite is considered a low-hazard material. The finished composite emits no toxic fumes. The mixing process requires no harmful solvents. However, the mixing should be performed with rubber gloves, eye protection, and a dust mask, and should take place in a well-ventilated area. Cleanup is performed with water.

== Examples of use ==
Painting by Jeremy Gardiner using Jesmonite and acrylic paint

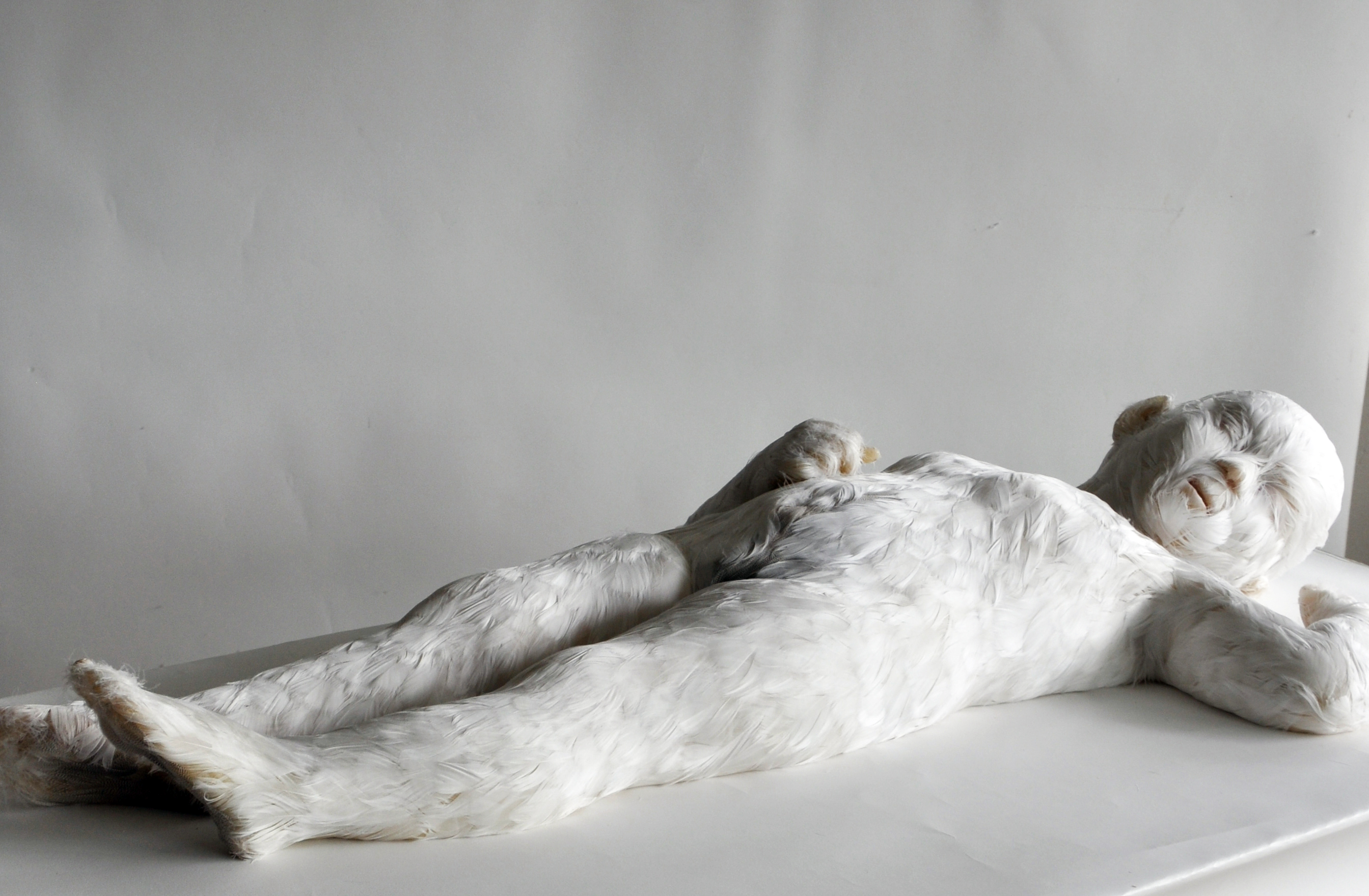
Feather Child sculpture by Lucy Glendinning, made of Jesmonite, feathers, and wax

=== 2012 Thames Diamond Jubilee Pageant ===
In the 2012, Thames Diamond Jubilee Pageant, the ornate prow sculptures on the Royal barges Gloriana and MV Spirit of Chartwell were carved and moulded in Jesmonite and decorated with gold leaf. These included dolphins, relief plaques and Old Father Thames.

=== A Spire ===
A Spire is a cast Jesmonite sculpture by British-Japanese sculptor Simon Fujiwara, commissioned to stand outside the new Laidlaw Library of the University of Leeds, England, in 2015. The lower sections incorporate particles of coal, to acknowledge the city's early industries, and the upper stages show cables and leaves reflecting the digital and natural world. The 9-metre-tall (30 ft) cylindrical form relates to two nearby church spires on Woodhouse Lane.
