= Mladen Bizumic =

New Zealand contemporary artist

Mladen Bizumic is a New Zealand contemporary artist working across photography, painting, installation and video. He has exhibited at the Venice Biennale, Istanbul Biennial, Busan Biennale and Auckland Triennial. His work puts nature, culture and technology in relation.

== Early life and education ==
Bizumic was born in 1976 in Yugoslavia and was raised in Auckland, New Zealand. He studied at the Elam School of Fine Arts at the University of Auckland, where he completed a Bachelor of Fine Arts and a Master of Fine Arts, both with first-class honours. He was a student of the artist Michael Parekōwhai and worked as Parekōwhai's assistant.

He later undertook doctoral study at the Academy of Fine Arts Vienna. His dissertation, Photo-capitalism: On Social Relations in the Production and Distribution of Contemporary Art was supervised by Diedrich Diederichsen and Stephen Zepke.

== Career ==
Bizumic held his first solo exhibition at Sue Crockford Gallery in Auckland in 2001. In 2002, he presented Tauranga Guggenheim at Artspace Aotearoa. In 2003, he staged Fiji Biennale Pavilions at the Govett-Brewster Art Gallery, consisting of models and proposals for an international art biennial in Fiji. In 2003, Bizumic's project The Night Shift proposed transporting part of Hauturu/Little Barrier Island to the Venice Lagoon.

Bizumic was an artist-in-residence at the Govett-Brewster Art Gallery in 2003 and received the Frances Hodgkins Fellowship at the University of Otago in 2004. In 2006 he was awarded the Creative New Zealand Berlin Visual Artists' Residency at Künstlerhaus Bethanien in Berlin.

Bizumic has exhibited internationally, including at the Venice Biennale, Moscow Biennale, Istanbul Biennial, Busan Biennale, Lyon Biennale and Auckland Triennial. His work has also been exhibited at institutions including the Museum of Applied Arts in Vienna, the Zachęta National Gallery of Art in Warsaw, the Leopold Museum in Vienna and Camera Austria in Graz.

In 2020, Bizumic held a Visual Arts Residency hosted by the Austrian Cultural Forum in London, and in 2022 he received the State Fellowship for Art Photography from the Arts and Culture Division of the Austrian Federal Chancellery.

== Public collections ==
Bizumic's work is held in public collections in New Zealand and internationally. The Chartwell Collection of Auckland Art Gallery Toi o Tāmaki, the Govett-Brewster Art Gallery, the University of Auckland Art Collection, the Victoria University Art Collection, and Hocken Collections, University of Otago hold works by Bizumic. Te Papa Tongarewa acquired Aipotu in 2005.

International collections holding his work include Museum moderner Kunst Stiftung Ludwig Wien (mumok), MAK – Museum of Applied Arts, Vienna, and the George Eastman Museum in Rochester, New York. The George Eastman Museum acquired Picture Material (Rochester, NY) in 2014.

== Art and themes ==
Bizumic works in photography, painting, installation, and video. His work is said to explore how the world is perceived and constructed, and how it can be otherwise. Tauranga Guggenheim (2002) imagined a Guggenheim museum built in the New Zealand provincial city of Tauranga, while The Night Shift (2003) imagined moving Hauturu/Little Barrier Island so that it sat inside the Venice Lagoon. The work asked why New Zealand could not shape an environment in Europe, the same way Europe had once shaped environments in New Zealand. Bizumic's work has been described as looking at the legacy of modernism by breaking it down into disassembled sensory effects. Bizumic's work was included in In Shifting Light, a group exhibition on New Zealand landscape art at Auckland Art Gallery (2008–2009), alongside works by Colin McCahon, Ralph Hotere and Charles Goldie.

From 2013 to 2017, Bizumic developed a body of work based on the history of Kodak and the transition from film-based to digital photography. The project was presented in exhibitions including Kodak Employed 144,000 People. Instagram 13. at MOSTYN in Wales and Georg Kargl in Vienna, and was documented in the 2018 publication Photo Boom Photo Bust. In this publication, Bizumic's Kodak project is described in relation to the changing conditions of photographic production, presentation and circulation.

In MoMA's Baby (2019), presented at MAK Vienna, Bizumic used a flatbed scanner in conjunction with mycelium growth to produce large-format works. His work STUDIO (A Conversation with Joan Levin Kirsch) examined the history of digital image scanning and is held in the MAK collection.

In 2020, Bizumic contributed the artistic exhibition design for Bakelite at the MAK in Vienna. Other artists who have undertaken interventions involving MAK collections include Jenny Holzer, Donald Judd, and Markus Schinwald.

== Publications ==
Fiji Biennale Pavilions. New Plymouth: Govett-Brewster Art Gallery, 2003/2004. ISBN 0-908848-66-8. Sister Cities of Babel. Paris: Fondation d’entreprise Ricard, 2008. Bankruptcy & Reorganization. Poznań: Centrum Kultury Zamek, 2014. ISBN 978-83-64750-02-1. Photo Boom Photo Bust. Berlin: Revolver Publishing, 2018. ISBN 978-3-95763-415-3.
