= Kunsthaus Bregenz =

Contemporary art museum in Austria

Coordinates: 47°30′17″N 9°44′52″E

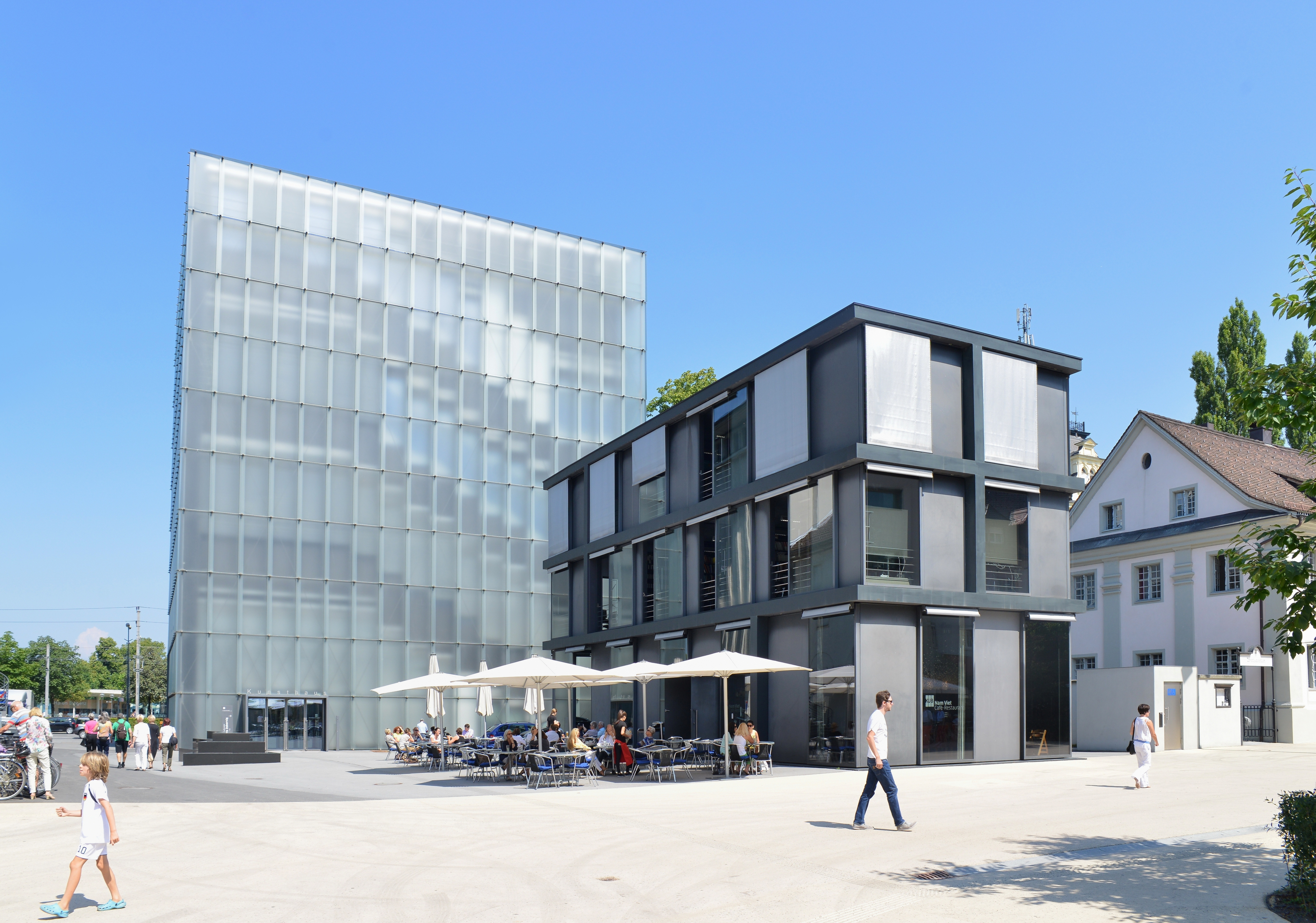
- Kunsthaus Bregenz
- Established: 1990–1997
- Location: Bregenz, Vorarlberg (Austria)
- Type: Art gallery (contemporary art)
- Director: Thomas D. Trummer
- Website: https://www.kunsthaus-bregenz.at/?L=1

The Kunsthaus Bregenz (KUB) presents temporary exhibitions of international contemporary art in Bregenz, Vorarlberg (Austria).

== History ==
Commissioned by the State of Vorarlberg and designed by the Swiss architect Peter Zumthor, the Kunsthaus Bregenz was built between 1990 and 1997. The KUB opened in July 1997 with an exhibition by the American artist James Turrell.

Edelbert Köb, founding director (1997–2000) of the Kunsthaus Bregenz, was succeeded by Eckhard Schneider (2000–2008) and Yilmaz Dziewior (2009–2015). Rudolf Sagmeister was the curator for 30 years (1992–2022). Thomas D. Trummer has been director of the Kunsthaus Bregenz since May 1, 2015.

For the celebration of its 25th anniversary, the KUB organised an exhibition at the Biennale in Venice from April 20 to July 4, 2022.

== Architecture ==
The art museum stands in the light of Lake Constance. It is made of glass and steel and a cast concrete stone mass which endows the interior of the building with texture and spatial composition. From the outside, the building looks like a lamp. It absorbs the changing light of the sky, the haze of the lake, it reflects light and color and gives an intimation of its inner life according to the angle of vision, the daylight, and the weather.

— Peter Zumthor,

Majestically impervious to the external gaze, the glass-sheathed cube standing on the shore of Lake Constance has been an aesthetic presence in Vorarlberg for ten years.

— Neue Zürcher Zeitung, August 3, 2007

The Kunsthaus Bregenz was designed by the Swiss architect Peter Zumthor, 2009 Pritzker Architecture Prize laureate, and winner of the Mies van der Rohe Award for European Architecture in 1998. The KUB has since received numerous distinctions for its method of construction. One of the major modern art galleries worldwide, it is a fine example of architectural minimalism. Distinguished by its imposing external form and unwavering spatial concept, the building was conceived as a daylight museum. Swiss architect Peter Zumthor's design, in his own words, aimed at fulfilling an art gallery’s chief function: to be a place for art and a place where people can peacefully encounter art. For artists exhibiting at the KUB, the architecture is a measure and conceptual stimulus for their projects, especially when entire new series of works are being produced. The architecture is an indispensable platform for the KUB's international exhibition program.

=== Location ===
The KUB is a prominent solitary construction in downtown Bregenz near the vorarlberg museum and Vorarlberger Landestheater and not far from the lakefront. Together with the Landestheater it frames an open square between the old town and the lake.

=== Façade ===
The façade consists of 912 finely etched equally sized glass panels weighing some 250 kg each, secured by clips to a steel framework. These panels form a free-standing, light-diffusing skin, independent of the actual building, that serves to initially refract the incident daylight and conduct it to the light ceilings in the exhibition halls. At dark, the artificial lighting from the interior shines through inner light bands and outer skin to show the building's interior life. The gap between light skin and building accommodates servicing equipment. Artists exhibiting at the KUB have sometimes made use of the façade in their installations.

=== Interior ===
Materials distinguish the interior, with exposed unpainted concrete visibly dominating. The floors and stairways are of polished terrazzo, the walls and ceilings of exposed unpolished concrete. The ground floor accommodates foyer, checkroom, cashier's desk, and catalogue sales, although most of its almost 500 m2 is used as a multifunctional exhibiting space for KUB Arena projects. Aside from its etched glass outer walls, three differently positioned concrete wall-slabs are visible on the ground floor. These support the Kunsthaus floors and ceilings, structuring the exhibition space on all three upper stories and dividing it from the main stairways, emergency exits, and passenger and freight elevators. Uniformly positioned entrances and exits structure a route through ground floor and upper stories. The latter differ only in ceiling height; each can be used as one large space or scaled down by means of mobile partitions, depending on the project. All three upper stories are top-lit. The ceilings of the exhibition spaces are of loosely joined glass panels. Incident light enters the building on all four sides through light bands and is distributed through the interior volume of each story by the glass ceiling panels. Artificial lighting in the cavity above the glass ceilings complements or replaces daylight as required. These light sources are not visible. The ground and three upper stories and their material and formal aesthetic make up a unity with great potential for art installations. Two subterranean levels complete the spatial program. The first, supplied with daylight by a light pit, accommodates a lecture room, the museum educational center, and sanitary rooms, separated from the non public areas (stock, maintenance, personnel rooms) by translucent glass brick walls. The second subterranean level is closed to the public. It accommodates an originals archive and storage space as well as the electrical, heating, and climate controls.

=== Administration building, café ===
The KUB administration building is set a short way off from the town side of the Kunsthaus, its black façade directed at the front of the Kunsthaus and its entrance. It acts as a transitional structure to the smaller and low buildings of the old part of the town. In addition to administration offices, the ground floor houses the KUB café. Peter Zumthor has displayed his uncompromising architectural vision here again, café, bar area, and kitchen being faced with black exposed concrete. In separating these amenities indispensable to a modern art gallery from the art exhibiting building, the latter can devote itself to its primary purpose.

=== KUB collection showcase ===
The Kunsthaus Bregenz has its own collection. One of the largest groups of works in the collection consists of architectural models by Peter Zumthor. Some of these exhibits have been archived since the architect's solo exhibition in 2007. Further models have been and are still being added to the collection as permanent loans. Buildings and projects that were realized as well as those that remained in the design stage are on show. The variety displayed in the exhibition demonstrates the outstanding role that working with models and materials such as wood, metal, or clay plays in Peter Zumthor's studio.

== Exhibitions ==
The Kunsthaus Bregenz is one of Europe's leading galleries for contemporary art both architecturally and in terms of its program. The Kunsthaus exhibits works by international contemporary artists who generally create art work specifically for the Kunsthaus. The KUB also has its own collection with two core areas: “Archive Art Architecture” and “Contemporary Austrian Art.” Select works of exhibiting artists have been expanding the latter part of the collection since 2009.

The KUB not only addresses international concerns with its exhibitions and projects, but also helps shape the cultural identity of Vorarlberg with regional projects. Noteworthy examples are Gottfried Bechtold's “Signatur 02” at the Silvretta dam, the American artist Jenny Holzer’s “Truth Before Power” (2004), involving the projection of large-format texts onto architectural and natural monuments in Vorarlberg, from August 2010 through April 2012, the British sculptor Antony Gormley’s landscape project “Horizon Field”, or, in Winter of 2019, the large-scale facade project "KUNSTHAUS" by artist Anne Marie Jehle.

Apart from extensive and prestigious shows in its main exhibition spaces, the KUB also ran projects with a processual and interdisciplinary bias in the KUB Arena on the ground floor, or projects at the KUB Basement.

Alongside its exhibitions, the Kunsthaus offers an extensive educational program and a vast variety of events.The Kunsthaus Bregenz publishes work-relevant books, collections of essays, and catalogues, often in close collaboration with exhibiting artists and designers such as Walter Nikkels or Stefan Sagmeister. Exclusive special editions for the Kunsthaus Bregenz are an outcome of the close collaboration between artists and their exhibition production.

== List of exhibitions ==
Year	Artist(s)	Exhibition	Duration
1997	James Turrell	James Turrell	July 26–Sept. 7
	32 international artists	Kunst in der Stadt 1	July 26–Sept. 7
	50 international artists	KünstlerInnen	Sept. 29–Nov. 30
	Per Kirkeby	Personale: Malerei, Zeichnung, Skulptur	Dec. 6, 1997–Feb. 15, 1998
1998	Lois Renner	Lois Renner	Feb. 28–April 13
	Franz Ackermann, Marcel Broodthaers, Ingo Günther, Moshekwa Langa, Carsten & Olaf Nicolai, Georg Nussbaumer, Valeska Peschke, Eva Wohlgemuth, Yukinori Yanagi	Atlas Mapping: Künstler als Kartographen. Kartographie als Kultur	Feb. 28-April 13
	Adrian Schiess	Malerei. Personale	April 25–June 28
	Georg Baselitz, Max Bill, Daniel Buren, Heinrich Dunst, Helmut Federle, Christoph Haerle, Marcia Hafif, Erwin Heerich, Gottfried Honegger, Donald Judd, Per Kirkeby, Cornelius Kolig, Gerhard Merz, Francois Morellet, Walter Pichler, Ulrich Rückriem, Bernar Venet, Franz Erhard Walther, Peter Wigglesworth, Heimo Zobernig	Räume der Kunst	April 25–June 28
	Sepp Dreissiger	66 Fotoportraits aus der Vorarlberger Kultur	May 8–June 28
	47 international artists	Kunst in der Stadt 2	July 11–Sept. 20
	42 international artists	Lifestyle	July 11–Sept. 20
	Albert Bechtold, Edmund Kalb, Edwin Neyer, Rudolf Wacker	Bechtold/Kalb/Neyer/Wacker: Body of Work	Oct. 3–June 27, 1999
	Rainer Ganahl	Rainer Ganahl	Oct. 10–Nov. 22
	Erwin Bohatsch	Malerei	Nov. 28, 1998–Jan. 24, 1999
	Gerhard Merz	Dresden	Nov. 28, 1998–Jan. 24, 1999
1999	Ingeborg Strobl	Einige Gegenstände. Und Sonnenuntergang	Jan. 30–April. 5
	Erwin Wurm	one minute sculptures	Jan. 30–April. 5
	Lucinda Devlin, Andreas Gursky, Candida Höfer	Räume	April 9–June 27
	Ernst Strouhal & Heimo Zobernig	Der Katalog	May 28–June 27
	Wolfgang Laib	Personale	July 10–Sept. 19
	32 international artists	Kunst in der Stadt 3	July 10–Sept. 19
	Keith Sonnier	Environmental Works 1968–99	Oct. 2–Nov. 28
	Helmut Federle	Personale	Dec. 9, 1999–Feb. 6, 2000
2000	Peter Kogler	Personale	Feb. 19–April 30
	Donald Judd	Farbe	May 13–July 2
	Atelier van Lieshout, CALC, Kommune Friedrichshof /Theo Altenberg, Irene & Christine Hohenbüchler, The Icelandic Love Corporation, Lyn Löwenstein, Pierre Montavon / Justo Gallego Martinez, N55, Walter Pilar, Ross Sinclair	LKW(Lebenskunstwerke)	July 15–Sept. 17
	Symposium Kunsthäuser	Architektur vs Kunst – Kunst vs Museum	Nov. 16–18
	Concept by Suzanne Greub, Vittorio Magnago Lampugnani and Angeli Sachs	Museums for a New Millenium	Oct. 3, 2000–Jan. 7, 2001
2001	Daniel Buren	Les Couleurs Traversées	Jan. 27–March 18
	Olafur Eliasson	The mediated motion	March 31–May 13
	Günther Förg	FÖRG	May 24–July
	Jeff Koons	Jeff Koons	July 18–Sept. 16
	Hiroshi Sugimoto	The Architecture of Time	Sept. 27–Jan. 6, 2002
2002	Douglas Gordon	Douglas Gordon	Jan. 17–April 14
	Gilbert & George	Gilbert & George	April 28–June 23
	Louise Bourgeois	Zeichnungen und Skulpturen – Drawings and Sculptures	July 6–Sept. 15
	Ruth Schnell	Territorism (KUB Façade)	July 12–Aug. 18
	Pierre Huyghe	L'expédition scintillante	Sept. 28–Nov. 24
	Doug Aitken	NEW OCEAN (a shifting exhibition)	Dec. 7, 2002–Jan. 26, 2003
2003	Mariko Mori	Wave UFO	Feb. 8–March 23
	Gerhard Merz	fragmente bregenz 2003	April 12–June 22
	Franz West	We'll Not Carry Coals	July 5–Sept. 14
	Anish Kapoor	My Red Homeland	Sept. 27–Nov. 16
	Eija-Liisa Ahtila, Tacita Dean, Anri Sala, Jane & Louis Wilson	Remind...	Nov. 30, 2003–Jan. 11, 2004
	Tone Fink	Carwalk	Dec. 6, 2003–Jan. 18, 2004
2004	Gary Hume	The Bird had a Yellow Beak	Jan. 24–March 21
	Santiago Sierra	300 Tonnen / 300 tons	April 3–May 23
	Jenny Holzer	Truth Before Power	June 12–Sept. 5
	Thomas Demand	Phototrophy	Sept. 18–Nov. 7
	Hans Schabus	Das Rendezvousproblem	Nov. 20, 2004–Jan. 16, 2005
2005	Jake + Dinos Chapman	Explaining Christians to Dinosaurs	Jan. 29–March 28
	concept by Otto Kapfinger and Marie-Hélène Contal	Konstruktive Provokation – Neues Bauen in Vorarlberg	Feb. 5–March 28
	Rachel Whiteread	Walls, Doors, Floors and Stairs	April 9–May 29
	Roy Lichtenstein	Klassik des Neuen – Classic of the New	June 12–Sept. 9
	Siegrun Appelt	288 KW	July 9–Sept. 4
	Marko Lulic, Dorit Margreiter, Nicole Six & Paul Petritsch, Gregor Zivic	Tu Felix Austria ... Wild at Heart	July 9–Sept. 4
	Janet Cardiff & George Bures Miller	The Secret Hotel	Nov. 26, 2005–Jan. 15, 2006
2006	Jean-Marc Bustamante	-beautifuldays-	Jan. 29–March 19
	gelitin	Chinese Synthese Leberkäse	April 13–May 28
	Michael Craig-Martin	Signs of Life	June 10–Aug. 13
	Tino Sehgal		Aug. 17–Sept. 24
	Gottfried Bechtold	Reine und gemischte Zustände	Oct. 1–Nov. 19
	Cindy Sherman		Dec. 2, 2006–Jan. 28, 2007
2007	Marcel Duchamp, Gerhard Merz, Damien Hirst, Jeff Koons	Re-Object	Feb. 18–May 13
	Joseph Beuys, Matthew Barney, Douglas Gordon, Cy Twombly	Mythos	June 2–Sept. 9
	Peter Zumthor	Bauten und Projekte 1986–2007	Sept. 29, 2007–Jan. 9, 2008
2008	Maurizio Cattelan		Feb. 2–March 24
	Carsten Höller	Carrousel	April 12–June 1
	Richard Serra	Drawings – Work Comes Out of Work	June 14–Sept. 14
	Jan Fabre	From the Cellar to the Attic – From the Feet to the Brain	Sept. 27–Jan. 25, 2009
2009	Markus Schinwald	Vanishing Lessons	Feb. 14–March 13
	Lothar Baumgarten	Seven Sounds/Seven Circles	April 25–June 21
	Antony Gormley	Antony Gormley	July 13–Oct. 4
	Tony Oursler	Lock 2,4,6	Oct. 24, 2009–Jan. 17, 2010
2010	Candice Breitz	The Scripted Life	Feb. 6–April 11
	Roni Horn	Well and Truly	April 24–July 4
	Cosima von Bonin	The Fatigue Empire	July 18–Oct. 3
	Raumlaborberlin	Bye Bye Utopia	July 18–Oct. 3
	Harun Farocki	Weiche Montagen / Soft Montages	Oct. 23–Jan. 9, 2011
	Antony Gormley	Horizon Field	Aug. 2010–April 2012
2011	Haegue Yang	Arrivals	Jan. 22–April 3
	Michal Heiman, Hannah Hurtzig, Katrin Mayer	KUB Arena: Living Archives - Kooperation Van Abbemuseum	Jan. 22–April 3
	Ei Arakawa, John Baldessari, Anne Collier, Simon Denny, Jean-Luc Godard, Wade Guyton, Rachel Harrison, institut for incongruous translation, Tobias Kaspar, Barbara Kruger, Richards Prince, Michael Riedel, Martha Rosler, Nora Schultz, Danh Vo, Kelley Walker, Andy Warhol	So machen wir es. Techniken und Ästhetik der Aneignung / That's the way we do it. The Techniques and Aesthetic of Appropriation	April 16–July 3
	Yona Friedman and Eckhard Schulze-Fielitz	KUB Arena	April 16–July 3
	Ai Weiwei	Art/Architecture	July 16–Oct. 16
	45 international artists	KUB Arena: Anfang Gut. Alles Gut. / Beginning good. All good.	July 16–Oct. 16
	Valie Export	Archiv / Archive	Oct. 29–Jan. 22, 2012
	Theatre project: International Institute of Political Murder (IIPM) Berlin	KUB Arena: Hate Radio	Oct. 29–Jan. 22, 2012
2012	Yvonne Rainer	Raum, Körper, Sprache / Space, Body, Language	Feb. 4-April 9
	Yto Barrada, Alice Creischer, Josef Dabernig, Katrina Daschner, Andreas Fogarasi, Claire Fontaine, Sanja Ivekovic, Julius Koller, Jiri Kovanda, Dorit Margreiter, Ulrike Müller, Andreas Pawlik, Mathias Poledna, Florian Pumhösl, Walid Raad, Jochen Smith, Andreas Siekmann, Mladen Stilinovic, Kamen Stoyanov, Milica Tomic	KUB Arena: Bleibender Wert? Kooperation >springerin< / Enduring Value? Cooperation with 'springerin'	Feb. 4-April 9
	Danh Võ	Vô Danh	April 21-June 24
	Ulrike Müller	KUB Arena: Herstory Inventory: 100 feministische Zeichnungen von 100 KünstlerInnen / 100 feminist drawings by 100 artists	April 21-June 24
	Peter Zumthor	KUB Sammlungsschaufenster: Architekturmodelle Peter Zumthor / Architectural Models by Peter Zumthor	June 23-Oct. 28
	Ed Ruscha	Reading Ed Ruscha	July 7-Oct. 14
	Conference Concept by Eva Birkenstock, Diedrich Diederichsen, Max Jorge Hinderer Cruz, Jens Kastner, Ruth Sonderegger	KUB Arena: Sommerakademie. Kunst und Ideologiekritik nach 1989 / Art and ideological criticism after 1989	Sept. 24-Sept. 30
	Florian Pumhösl	Räumliche Sequenz	Oct. 26-Jan. 20, 2013
	Jacob Barua, Sam Hopkins, Laura Horelli, Peterson Kamwathi Waweru, Maasai Mbili, James Muriuki, Kevo Stero, Studio Propolis	KUB Arena: Nairobi - A State of Mind, Cooperation Goethe-Institute Nairobi, Kenya	Oct. 26-Jan. 20, 2013
2013	Neil Beloufa, Minerva Cuevas, Mariechen Danz, Isa Genzken, Hans Haacke, Keith Haring, Teresa Margolles, Ken Okiishi, Julika Rudelius, Yorgos Sapountzis, Cindy Sherman, Andreas Siekmann, Dirk Stewen, Pascale Marthine Tayou, Rosemarie Trockel, Cathy Wilkes	Love is Colder than Capital	Feb. 2-April 14
	Andy Warhol	KUB Arena: Andy Warhol - Fifteen Minutes of Fame	Feb. 2-April 14
	Wade Guyton and Kelley Walker	Wade Guyton, Guyton\Walker, Kelley Walker	April 27-June 30
	Yane Calovski, David Maljkovic, Dorit Margreiter, Nick Mauss, Charlotte Moth, Stephen Willats, Johannes Wohnseifer	KUB Arena: On the Move. European Kunsthalle at the KUB Arena	Aug. 5-Aug 11
	Gabriel Orozco	Natural Motion	July 13-Oct. 6
	SKILLS, Camilla Milena Fehér, Sylvi Kretzschmar, Matias Aguayo x Mostro	KUB Arena: Back to the Future. A Week in Summer of Art, Films, and Music	Aug. 5-Aug. 11
	Barbara Kruger		Oct. 19-Jan. 12, 2014
	Dora Garcia	KUB Arena: Dora Garcia	Oct. 19-Jan. 12, 2014
2014	Pascal Marthine Tayou	I love you	Jan. 25-April. 27
	Gerry Bibby and Juliette Blightman	KUB Arena: Gerry Bibby and Juliette Blightman	Jan. 25-April. 27
	Maria Eichhorn	Maria Eichhorn	May 10-June 7
	Sung Hwan Kim and dogr	KUB Arena: I will dress you, howl bowel owl	May 10-June 7
	Richard Prince	It's a Free Concert	July 19-Oct. 5
	Julian Göthe	KUB Arena: Sommerfestival. Vom Werden und Sein	July 29-Aug. 3
	Jeff Wall	Tableaux Pictures Photographs 1996-2013	Oct. 18-Jan. 11 2015
	Hannah Weinberg	KUB Arena: Hannah Weinberg	Oct. 18-Jan. 11 2015
2015	Rosemarie Trockel	Märzôschnee ûnd Wiebôrweh sand am Môargô niana me	Jan. 24-April 6
	Trix and Robert Haussmann	KUB Arena: Reflexion und Transparenz	Jan. 25-April 6
	Berlinde De Bruyckere	The Embalmer	April 18-July 5
	Dexter Sinister	KUB Arena: At 1:1 Scale.*	April 18-July 5
	Joan Mitchell	Retrospective. Her Life and Paintings	July 18-Oct. 25
	Kerstin Brätsch, Debo Eilers and Kaya Serene	KUB Arena: KAMP KAYA	Aug. 27-Aug. 30
	Heimo Zobernig	Heimo Zobernig	Nov. 12-Jan. 10 2016
	Amy Sillman	KUB Arena: Yes & No	Nov. 12-Jan. 10 2016
2016	Susan Philipsz	Night and Fog	Jan. 30-April 3
	Trix and Robert Haussmann	KUB Arena: Reflexion und Transparenz	Jan. 25-April 27
	Anna-Sophie Berger	KUB Billboards	Feb. 26-May 17
	Theaster Gates	Black Archives	April 23-June 26
	Gaylen Gerber and Studio for Propositional Cinema	KUB Projects: Exhibition	June 23–26
	Feminist Land Art Retreat	KUB Billboards	May 5-July 25
	Wael Shawky	Wael Shawky	July 16-Oct. 23
	Maja Cule	KUB Billboards	Aug. 5-Oct. 31
	Sol Calero	KUB Projects	Oct. 23-Jan. 15 2017
	Lawrence Weiner	WHEREWITHAL WAS ES BRAUCHT	Nov. 12-Jan. 15 2017
	Daiga Grantina	KUB Billboards	Nov. 4-Jan. 15 2017
2017	Rachel Rose	Rachel Rose	Feb. 4-April 17
	Adrián Villar Rojas	The Theater of Disappearance	May 13-Aug. 27
	Simon Fujiwara	KUB Billboards: Campaign	April 21-Jan. 7 2018
	Peter Zumthor	Dear to Me	Sept. 16-Jan. 7 2018
2018	Simon Fujiwara	Hope House	Jan. 27-April 8
	Flaka Haliti	KUB Billboards	Feb. 16-April 22
	Mika Rottenberg	Mika Rottenberg	April 21-July 1
	Alicia Frankovich	KUB Billboards: After Blue Marble	May 5-July 15
	David Claerbout	David Claerbout	July 14-Oct. 7
	Lili Reynaud Dewar	KUB Billboards	July 26-Oct. 21
2019	Tacita Dean	Tacita Dean	Oct. 20-Jan. 6
	Maeve Brennan	KUB Billboards	Nov. 8-Jan. 20
	Ed Atkins	Ed Atkins	Jan. 19-March 31
	Miriam Cahn	DAS GENAUE HINSCHAUEN	Apr. 13-Jun. 30
	Thomas Schütte	Thomas Schütte	July 13-Oct. 6
2020	Raphaela Vogel	Bellend bin ich aufgewacht	Oct. 19-Jan.6
	Anne Marie Jehle	KUB Facade Project	Dec 13 - March 31
	Bunny Rogers	Kind Kingdom	Jan 18-Apr. 13
	Art that is Unforgettable	KUB Billboards	Apr. 16-Summer 2020
	Helen Cammock, William Kentridge's The Centre of the Less Good Idea, Annette Messager, Rabih Mroué, Markus Schinwald, Marianna Simnett, Ania Soliman	Unforgettable Times	Jun 5-Aug. 30
	Peter Fischli	KUB Billboards	Sep 12 - Nov 29
	Oliver Laric	Johanniterkirche Feldkirch	Sep 26 - Jan 30 (2021)
2021	Jakob Lena Knebl & Ashley Hans Scheirl	KUB Billboards	Dec 12 - April 5
	Marcel Bascoulard	KUB Basement	Feb 20 - Apr 5
	Pamela Rosenkranz	KUB Billboards	Apr 17 - July 4
	Roman Signer	KUB Project 2021	Since May 1
	Lois Weinberger	KUB Basement	May 1 - July 4
	Lois Weinberger	KUB Vorplatz	May 1 - Feb 15
	Collection König-Lebschik	Collection Display	Jun 26 - Aug 29
	Anri Sala	KUB Billboards	Jul 17 - Oct 10
	Karl-Heinz Ströhle	Groundwork	Since July 2021
	Otobong Nkanga	KUB Billboards	Oct 23 - Mar 6 (2022)
2022	Dora Budor	KUB Billboards	Mar 19 - Jun 26
	Otobong Nkanga & Anna Boghiguian	Biennale di Venezia	Apr 20 - Jul 4
	Jordan Wolfson	KUB Billboards	Jul 16 - Oct 16
	Anna Boghiguian	KUB Billboards	Oct 22 - Feb 19 (2023)
2023	Valie Export	KUB Billboards	Mar 4 - Apr 10
	Monira Al Qadiri	KUB Billboards	Apr 12 - Jul 2
	Solange Pessoa	KUB Billboards	Nov 11 - Feb 4 (2024)
2024	Günter Brus	KUB Billboards	Feb 17 - May 20
	Anne Imhof	KUB Billboards	Jun 8 - Sept 22
	Tarek Atoui	KUB Billboards	Oct 12 - Jan 12 (2025)
2025	Precious Okoyomon	KUB Billlboards: One either loves oneself or knows oneself	Feb 1 - May 25
	Małgorzata Mirga-Tas	KUB Billboards	Jun 7 - Sept 28
	Group of anonymous artists	KUB Billboards: On Refusal, Infiltration, and the Gift	Oct 11 - Jan 18 (2026)

== See also ==
- List of museums in Vorarlberg
