= Heimo Zobernig =

Austrian artist

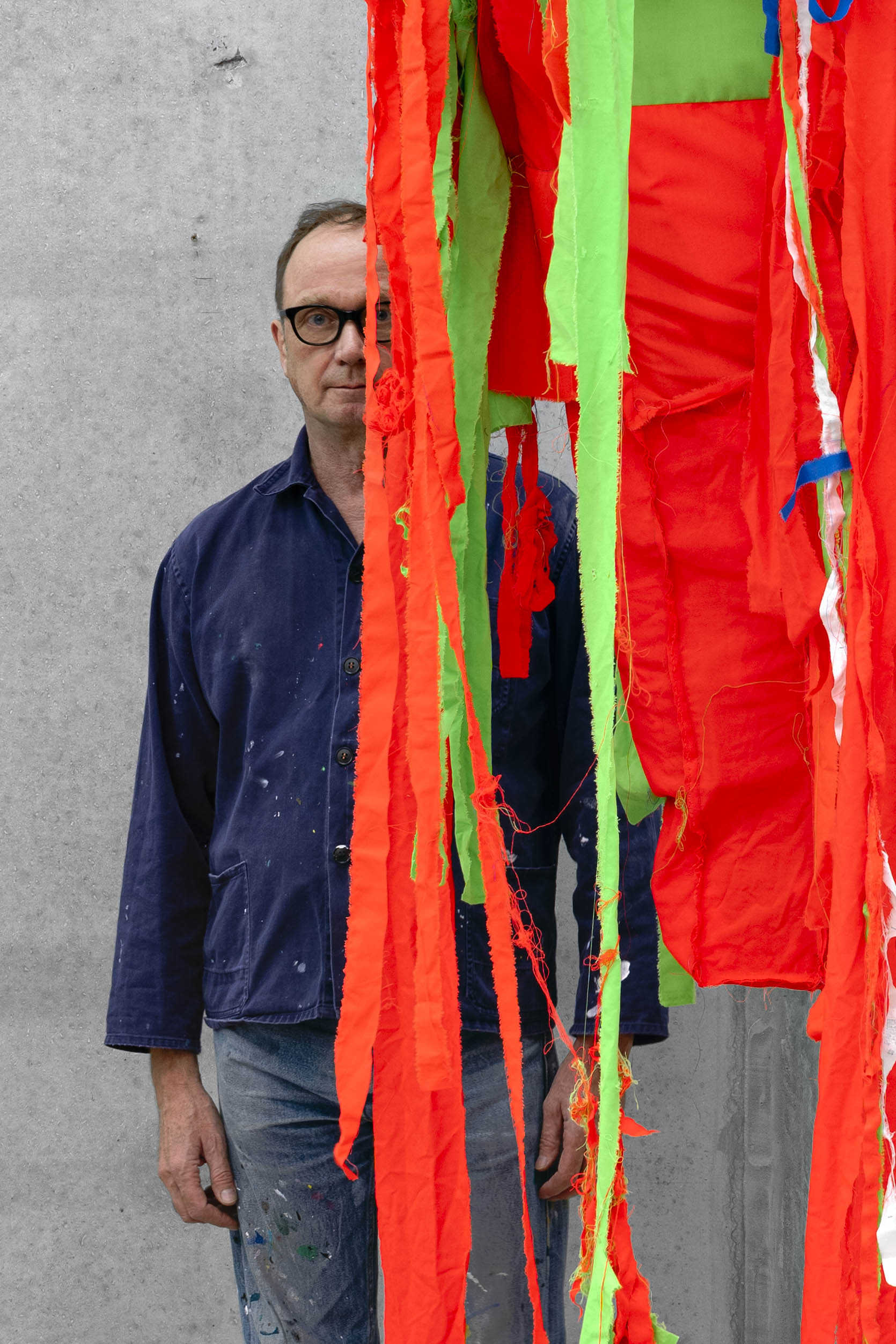
- Born: 1958 (age 67–68); Kötschach-Mauthen, Austria
- Education: Academy of Fine Arts, Vienna
- Known for: Contemporary Art
- Movement: Conceptual Art

Heimo Zobernig (born 1958) is an Austrian artist who works in a variety of media from painting and sculpture to site specific installation and design.

== Education ==
Zobernig attended the Academy of Fine Arts (Akademie der bildenden Künste), Vienna from 1977 to 1980 and graduated from the Academy of Applied Arts (Hochschule für angewandte Kunst), Vienna in 1983.

== Academic career ==
After teaching fellowships in Germany (1994-1995 Hochschule für bildende Künste Hamburg, 1999-2000 Staatliche Hochschule für Bildende Künste - Städelschule Frankfurt am Main) he was appointed professor of art at the Academy of Fine Arts, Vienna from 2000 to 2022.

== Work ==
Heimo Zobernig works in a variety of media - his spectrum ranges from sculpture, installation, painting, drawing and performance to video and architectural interventions. In the early 1980s, Zobernig began with the positions of geometric abstraction developed by modernism and turned the main thesis of minimal art “You get what you see” on its head. At first glance, his early black sculptures look like heavy industrially manufactured architectural elements, but on closer inspection they are actually handmade cardboard sculptures. Other preferred materials, such as pressboard, polystyrene, paper and textiles, also emphasize the object-like nature of the artwork. The reduced formal language engages with 20th century traditions such as Russian Constructivism, the Dutch De Stijl movement or the Zurich Concretists and reflects a “sober, untranscendental view of the world”. Zobernig analyzes the conditions of creation with a precision borrowed from the natural sciences. Typically, his works have no titles. Zobernig understands art as a communication system that is not only about the production of works or ultimate truths, but also about the social relationships between people and things. Zobernig makes discreet objects—paintings and sculptures—that by necessity have an integral awareness of their context and history, not only in relation to fine art but also architecture and design. He also conceives and builds whole environments that encourage an all-encompassing awareness on the part of his viewers. What an artwork is, how it functions, and how viewers perceive and interact with it are fundamental propositions in Zobernig's work.

In the course of the increasing importance of art as a social practice during the 1990s, Zobernig repeatedly furnished communication spaces such as canteens, conference rooms and pavilions in art institutions. For documenta X in Kassel in 1997, for example, he designed the hall intended for lectures and discussions.

His painterly work is extensive and shows monochrome, grids, stripes and writing. Zobernig uses these formal aspects repeatedly and combines them in different variations. In doing so, his paintings evoke both the painterly processes of classical modernism, in particular constructivist and concrete approaches, and paraphrase their continuation in the post-war avant-garde up to contemporary art.

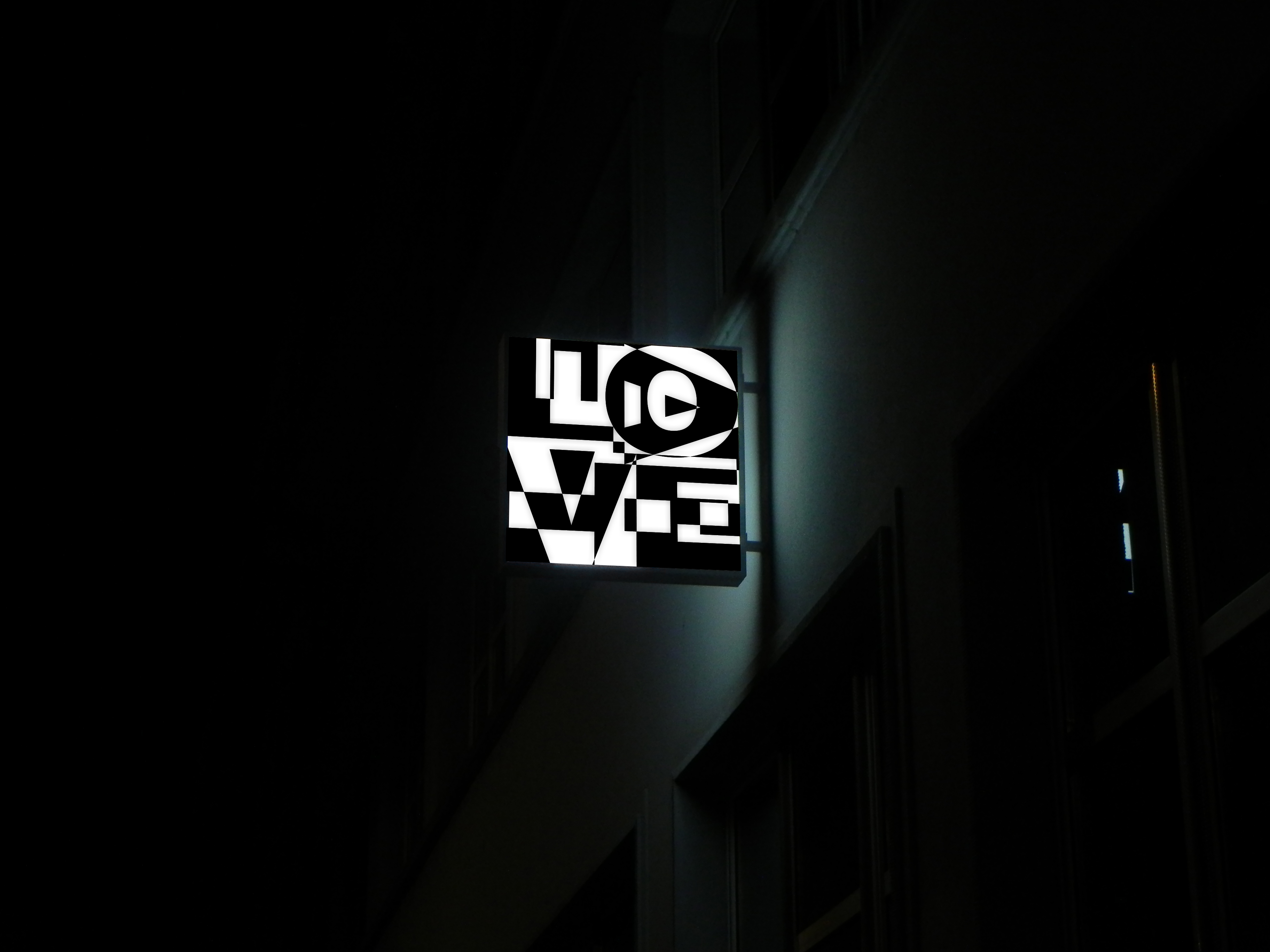
Heimo Zobernig, Untitled, LOVE HATE, 2012, 2m2 art space, Geneva

In "Untitled, LOVE HATE" for example, the use of Extra Bold Helvetica letters, as typical moderniste typeface, serves the appropriation/reinterpretation of Robert Indiana's painting (LOVE, 1966) taken up later on more politically by General Idea (AIDS, 1987) to create an paradoxal overlay between love and hate.

== Exhibitions (selection) ==
- 1986: Sonsbeek '86, Arnheim
- 1988: Aperto 88, Biennale di Venezia
- 1991: Villa Arson, Nice
- 1992: documenta 9, Kassel
- 1993: Neue Galerie, Graz
- 1996: The Renaissance Society at the University of Chicago
- 1997: documenta 10, Kassel
- 1997: Skulptur Projekte Münster
- 2002: mumok, Museum moderner kunst Stiftung Ludwig Wien, Vienna
- 2003: Kunsthalle Basel
- 2003: K21, Kunstsammlung nordrhein-Westfalen, Düsseldorf
- 2004: Biennale of Sydney
- 2005: Kunstverein Braunschweig
- 2008: Galleria Civica, Modena
- 2008: deSingel international Arts Centre, Antwerpen
- 2009: CAPC - Musée d'art contemporain de Bordeaux
- 2011: Kunsthalle Zürich
- 2011: Essl Museum - Kunst der Gegenwart, Klosterneuburg/Wien
- 2012: Palacio de Velázquez, Museo Reina Sofia, Madrid
- 2013: Kunsthaus Graz
- 2014: Mudam, Musée d'Art Moderne Grand-Duc Jean, Luxembourg
- 2015: Zobernig represented Austria in La Biennale di Venezia
- 2015: Kunsthaus Bregenz
- 2016: Malmö Konsthall
- 2016: Museum Ludwig, Cologne
- 2017: chess painting, MIT List Visual Arts Center, Cambridge, MA
- 2018: Petzel Gallery, New York
- 2019: Heimo Zobernig. Piet Mondrian, Albertinum, Dresden
- 2021: mumok, Museum moderner Kunst Stiftung Ludwig Wien
- 2021: MARe - Museum of Recent Art, Bukarest
- 2022: Petzel Gallery, New York
- 2023: Galerie Chantal Crousel, Paris

== Awards ==
- Otto Mauer Prize, 1993
- City of Vienna Prize for Fine Art, 1997
- Frederick Kiesler Prize for Architecture and the Arts, 2010
- Roswitha Haftmann Prize, 2016
- Honorary Doctor at The Faculty of Fine and Performing Arts at Lund University

== Publications ==
- Heimo Zobernig. Austelung. Katerlog, Verlag der Buchhandlung Walter König, Köln 2003
- Heimo Zobernig, Palacio de Velázquez, Madrid, Kunsthaus Graz, Verlag der buchhandlung Walter könig, Köln 2023
- Heimo Zobernig: Books & Posters Catalogue Raisonné, 1980–2015 (2017)
- Heimo Zobernig, ed.: Karola Kraus, mumok - Museum moderner Kunst Stiftung Ludwig Wien, Verlag der Buchhandlung Walther und Franz König, Köln 2021
