= Simon Fujiwara =

British artist (born 1982)

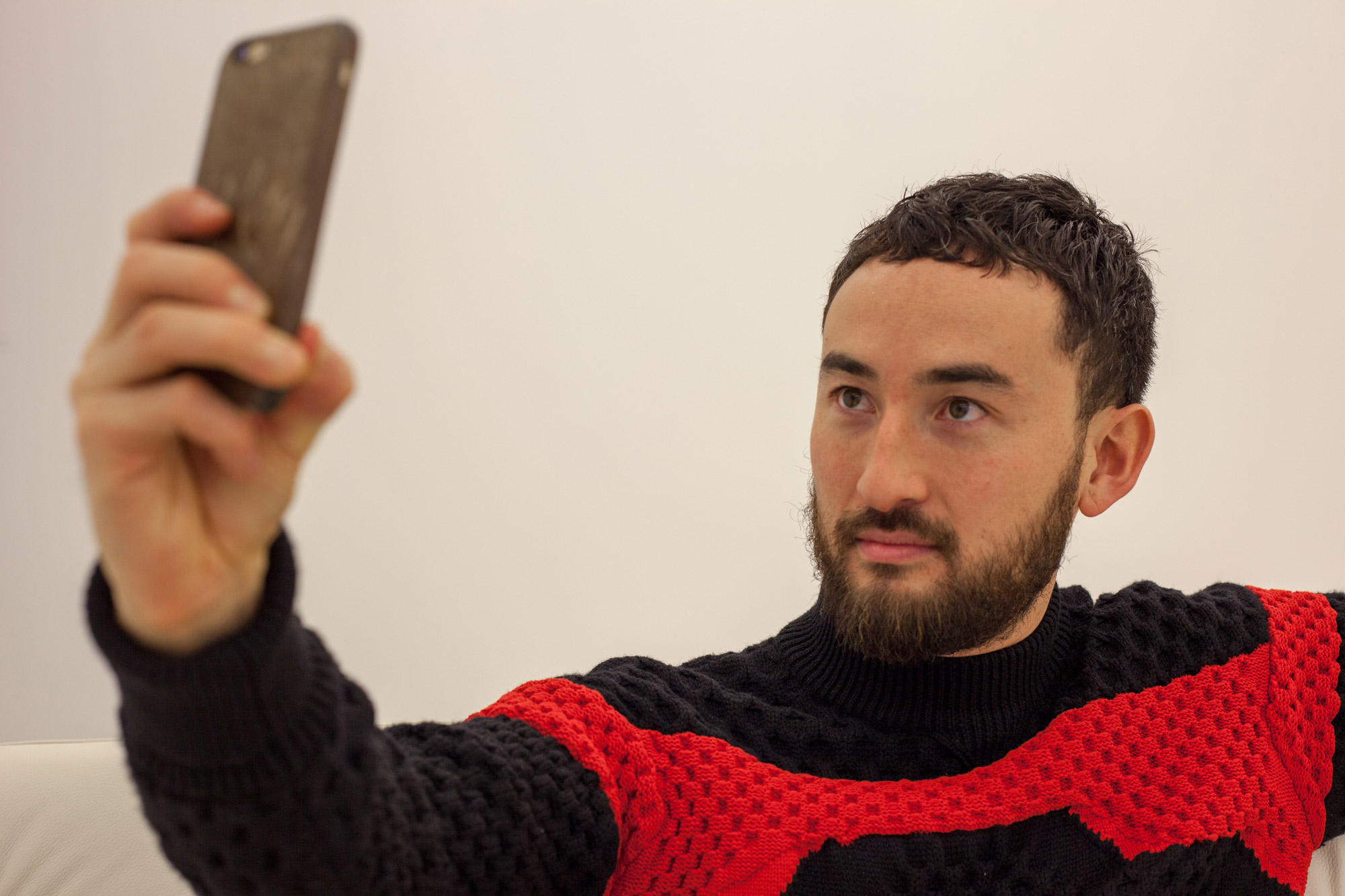
Simon Fujiwara, 2016

Simon Fujiwara (born 10 September 1982 in Harrow, United Kingdom) is a British artist.

His works range from paintings and photographs to installations, film and sculptures. They are shown all around the world, for example in the Tate Modern in London, the Palais de Tokyo in Paris, the Museum of Modern Art in New York, the Irish Museum of Modern Art in Dublin and the Tokyo Opera City Art Gallery.

In 2016 Simon Fujiwara showed shaved furs of animals in Tokyo, a multimedial biography of the Irish "traitor" Roger Casement in Dublin and the skin pigments of the German chancellor Angela Merkel, magnified by the factor of 1,000, in Berlin. In Bregenz (Austria) he built a replica of the Anne Frank House in Amsterdam.

Fujiwara sees his art as a mixture of politics, architecture and his own biography. In the Tate St. Ives for example he reconstructed the bar of a hotel his parents ran in Spain when Simon was little. He charged the scene with erotic elements.

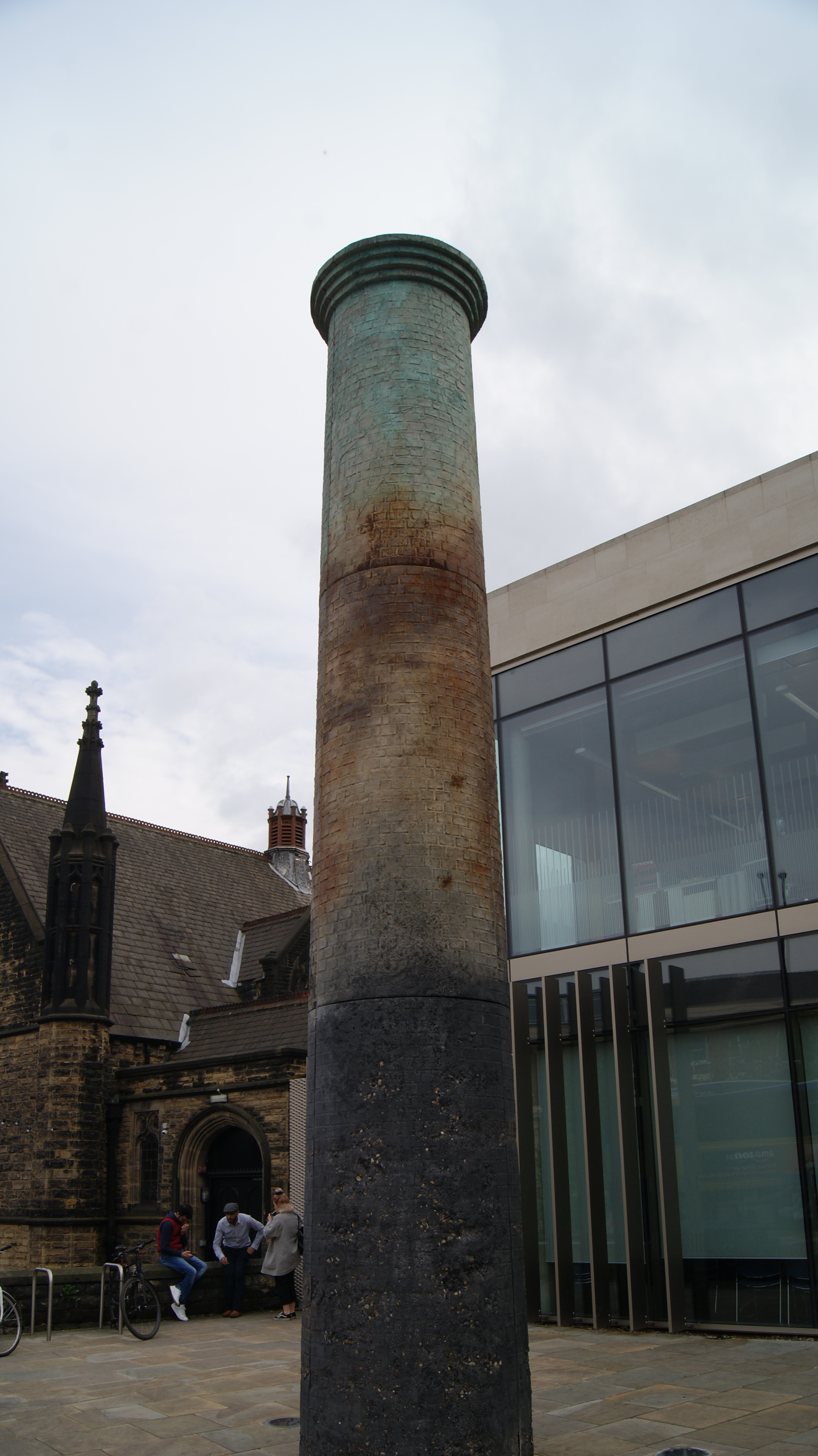
Fujiwara's 9m A Spire (2015), in cast jesmonite, at the University of Leeds

== Life ==
Simon Fujiwara was born in the London suburb of Harrow. His family (the mother British, the father Japanese) moved to Japan, later to Spain and finally to Cornwall, where Simon discovered his sense for art. He studied architecture at the University of Cambridge and, from 2005 until 2008, art at the Städelschule in Frankfurt. He lives in Berlin.

== Selected exhibitions and reviews ==
Fujiwara's works have been widely exhibited around the world both in solo and group exhibitions.

'The museum of incest' is among his earliest performance-based works to be selected for individual display marking the beginning of his career as an artist. Originally performed in 2008 at the Limoncello Gallery in London, 'The museum of incest' was replicated in several occasions and contexts throughout the years. A printed guide was published by Archive Books to accompany later versions of the installation.

In 2008, jointly with architect Sam Causer, Fujiwara conceived 'the closet gallery', a site-specific installation launched as part of the London Festival of Architecture and supported by the Architecture Foundation. His residency at the Los Angeles' MAK Centre for Contemporary Art culminated in 2009 with 'Impersonator', a performance investigating the cult of Arnold Schwarzenegger.

First exhibited in 2008 at the Neue Alte Brücke in Frankfurt am Main, 'Welcome to the Hotel Munber' denounced the oppression and censorship against homosexuals during the Francoist dictatorship in Spain. It was displayed, among the different locations, at Art Basel 41 in 2010, The Power Plant in 2011 and Tate St. Ives in 2012. It received particular attention on international media when in 2011 was censored at the Singapore Biennale. More specifically, some porno-homosexual imagery of the project were removed without the artist's consent.

For the 2010 Frieze Art Fair, he conceived 'Frozen'. Recognised with the Cartier Award for emerging artists, the site-specific installation recreates the archaeological ruins of an imaginary lost civilisation. In 2011 his first theatrical performance 'The boy who cried wolf' was presented at Berlin's Hebbel am Ufer theatre, New York's Performa 11 Biennale and San Francisco's Museum of Modern Art.

In his 2015 exhibition "Peoples of the Evening Land" at Proyectos Monclova in Mexico City, Fujiwara displayed new bodies of work more closely connected with his adopted home country of Germany, including through works based on rubbish separators used to sort waste in German kitchens, as well as a series of abstract paintings titled "Masks (Merkel)" depicting enlarged portraits of small sections of makeup worn by Angela Merkel.

- Brief biography by the Andrea Rosen Gallery:
- Biography by the Guggenheim Museum:
- Since 1982, Tate St. Ives
- Studio Pietà (King Kong Komplex), Andrea Rosen Gallery, New York City 2013, reviewed in the New York Times
- White Day, Tokyo Opera City Art Gallery, 2016
- The Humanizer, Irish Museum of Modern Art, Dublin 2016, reviewed by Frieze Magazine
- Joanne, The Photographers' Gallery London 2016, reviewed by The Guardian,
- Figures in a Landscape, Kunsthalle Düsseldorf, 2016–2017
- Hope House, Kunsthaus Bregenz, 2018
- Empathy I, Esther Schipper, Berlin 2018 , reviewed by Frieze Magazine and Mousse Magazine
- Revolution, Lafayette Anticipations, Paris 2018–2019
- It's a Small World, Museum of Contemporary Art Kiasma, Helsinki, 2024

== Awards ==
Between October 2008 and March 2009, Fujiwara was a MAK Center's artist-in-residence at the Schindler House in Los Angeles. In 2009 he was awarded the Arts Foundation Fellowship Award for Interior Architecture. The site-specific installation Frozen earned him the Cartier Award 2010 for emerging artists. Also in 2010, Fujiwara was awarded the IASPIS Residency in Gothenburg, and won the Baloise Art Prize with the installation Welcome to the Hotel Munber which was displayed at Art Basel in the Statements sector. In 2011 he was nominated for the South Bank Award for the visual art category.
