= London Design Fair =

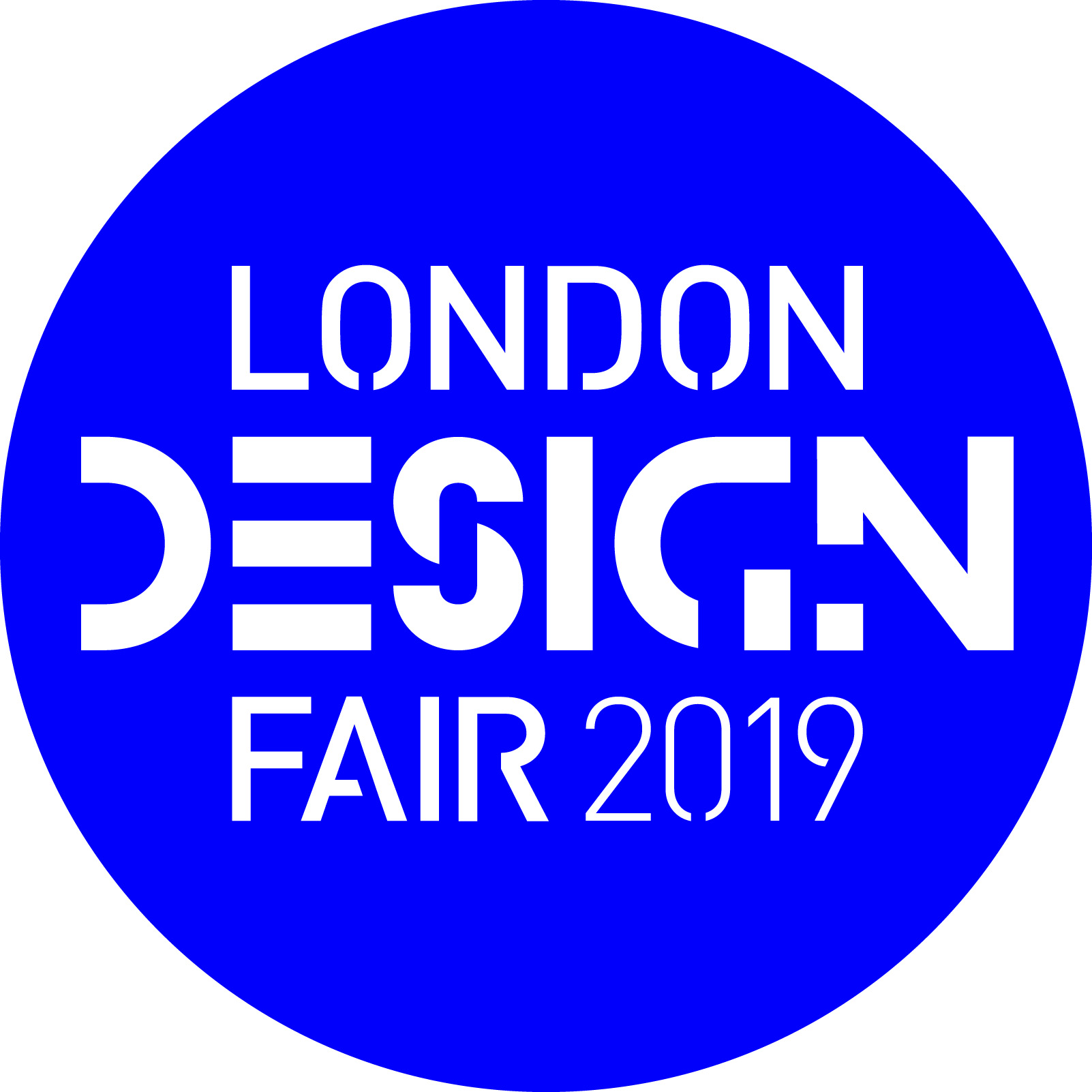
- Formerly: Tent London, Super Brands
- Industry: Trade Show
- Founded: 2007
- Founder: Jimmy MacDonald
- Headquarters: London, United Kingdom
- Website: londondesignfair.co.uk

The London Design Fair is an international trade show that occurs during the London Design Festival. It takes place in the Old Truman Brewery, on Brick Lane in East London over four days every September.

== About ==
Founded by Jimmy MacDonald in 2007, originally under the name Tent London until 2016, the trade show is an annual event to celebrate and promote design to a trade and public audience.

The London Design Fair hosts over 400 designers, brands, and features from all over the world. The Fairs visitor numbers have grown over the 10 years to over 29,000 visitors in 2018.
