= Markus Schinwald =

Austrian visual artist

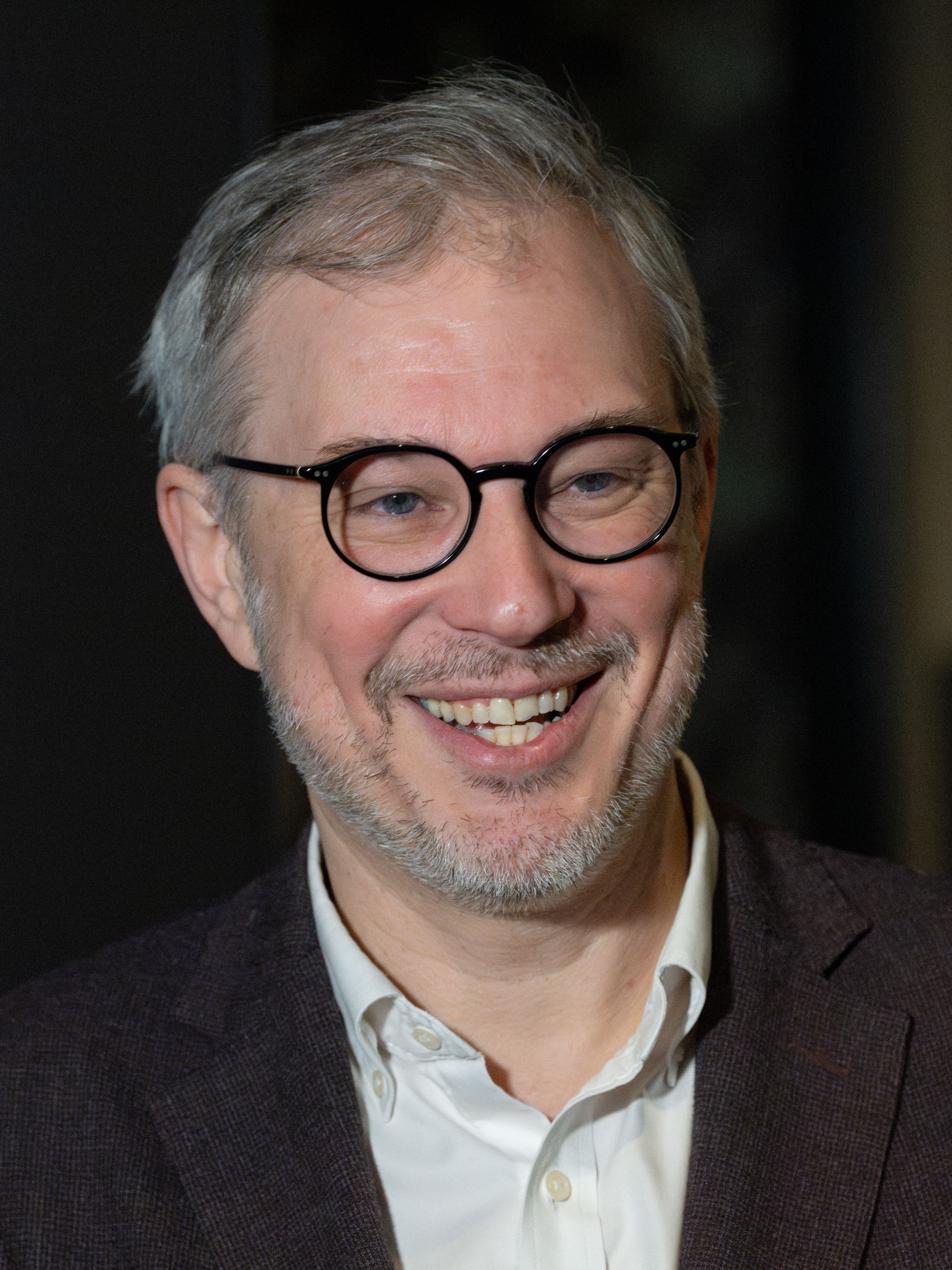
Markus Schinwald in 2026

Markus Schinwald (born 1973) is an Austrian visual artist. He lives and works in Vienna, Austria, and New York. Since 2021, Schinwald is professor at the Staatlichen Akademie der Bildenden Künste, Karlsruhe. Previously, he taught phenomenology at Yale University.

== Work ==
Occupied space and the body in its cultural context are central to Schinwald's works as foundational elements for transformation and manipulation. He has worked in a variety of media: painting, sculpture, film, performance, and large, site-specific installations. His work "is centered on the body as a cultural construct, as an incessantly actualized site at which the subject is constituted both in its identity and its instability and transversality. He is not true to one medium, but rather nomadic as he appropriates methods and/or devices from cultural theory, film, and poetry, among others. Dysfunctionality and disorder are key notions in his work." Schinwald's early training in fashion and costume history often becomes apparent in his work. One of his earliest pieces, Jubelhemd (1997), hovers between straitjacket and formal wear. The arms have been sewn in upside-down, provoking an ambivalent gesture reminiscent of both surrender and celebration, with hands to the sky.

In his work, Schinwald creates a precarious, at times unsettling, atmosphere. He equips the subjects of his 19th century portraits with peculiar veils, supports, wires and bandages, which the artist perceives as "prostheses for unspecified cases." Schinwald first began his over-painted portraits in the late 1990s, and has been a reference point for later work by artists like Hans-Peter Feldman, who imposes clown-noses onto oil portraits in a similar manner. Together with a team of conservators, Schinwald developed a technique in 2011 for integrating historical paintings into large canvases, extending the original work which, in effect, alters not only the scale of the artwork, but blurs the lines of the inserted image's historical and contextual fixity. Since 2019, Schinwald further accentuates this body of work with additions that reference the digitized world, incorporating technoid blurs of pixels and vertical purple lines suggestive of numerical glitches on a computer.

Like his manipulated paintings and black-and-white portraits, Schinwald's installations and spatial interventions, (for, among others, SFMoMA, Yvon Lambert Gallery, and Migros Museum) embrace constraints and compulsions. Representation and actuation often overlap in his work, whether it be the display of possible prosthetics with historical paintings, or manipulated table-leg sculptures with a choreographed performance. In 2013, a terrarium model at the Palais de Tokyo, Paris served as both model and overture to a companion exhibition, an extensive, mid-career survey, at CAPC Bordeaux,

Since 1999, Schinwald has also worked collaboratively with dancer Oleg Soulimenko on the Stage Matrix series, which has toured worldwide and been performed at, among others, Performa 07, Moderna Museet, and the Tanzquartier, Vienna. In 2015, Schinwald choreographed a piece for the Royal Swedish Ballet. From 2012 to 2018, Schinwald was the Vice President of the Vienna Secession. Together with Thomas D. Trummer and Hans Ulrich Obrist, he is also curator of the EVN Collection in Austria.

== Exhibitions ==
Schinwald is represented by Thaddaeus Ropac (London, Salzburg, Paris) and Gio Marconi (Milan).

Schinwald represented Austria in 2011 at the 54th Venice Biennial, where he created a vast, hanging labyrinth that disrupted the symmetry of Josef Hoffmann's 1934 construction. In the film for the exhibition, Orient (2011), the actors, appearing shipwrecked in decaying architecture, move with partially impulsive, partially dance-like choreography, both resisting and collaborating with their surroundings.

His works are to be found in numerous international collections, including the MoMA, Tate Modern Prada Foundation, SFMoMA, Musée d'Art Moderne, Paris, Kunsthaus Zürich, Israel Museum, Jerusalem, and the MUMOK – Museum Moderner Kunst, Vienna.

== Filmography ==
- dictio pii (2001)
- diarios [barragan] (2003)
- diarios [to you] (2003)
- 1st Part Conditional (2004)
- Children's Crusade (2004)
- Orient (2011)

== Monographs ==
- Moderna Museet, dictio pii, Stockholm: Moderna Museet, 2001. ISBN 91-7100-662-1.
- Frankfurter Kunstverein, Nicolaus Schafhausen (eds.), MARKUS SCHINWALD, Tableau Twain, New York: Lukas&Sternberg, 2004. ISBN 0-9745688-7-2
- Atelier Augarten and migros museum, Agnes Husslein Arco, Heike Munder, Thomas Trummer (eds.), Markus Schinwald, Zurich: JRP/Ringier, 2007. ISBN 978-3-901508-36-3
- Kunsthaus Bregenz, Markus Schinwald: Vanishing Lessons, Cologne: Buchhandlung Walther König, 2009. ISBN 978-3-86560-536-8
- 54th Venice Biennial, Markus Schinwald: La Biennale di Venezia 2011, Nürnberg: Verlag für moderne Kunst Nürnberg, 2011. ISBN 978-3-86984-223-3.
- Kunverein Hannover, Lentos Museum Linz, Markus Schinwald, Nürnberg: Verlag für moderne Kunst Nürnberg, 2011. ISBN 978-3-86984-236-3
- Galerie Thaddaeus Ropac, Dominique de Font-Réaulx,Markus Schinwald, Paris: Galerie Thaddeus Ropac, 2016. ISBN 978-2-91005-570-7
