= Lucy Glendinning =

British sculptor (born 1964)

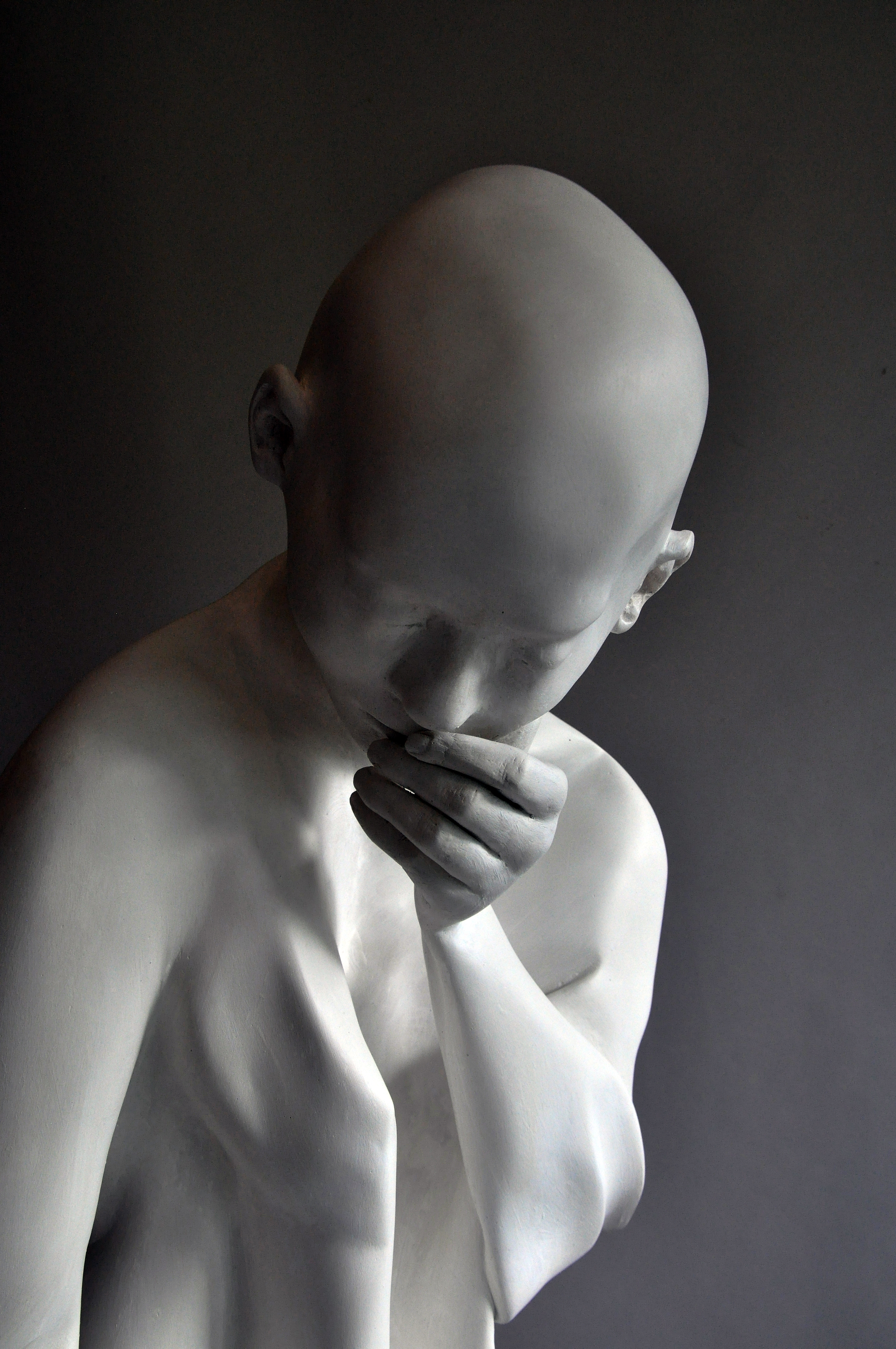

Lucy Glendinning (born 1964) is a British sculptor and installation artist based in Somerset, England. Her work explores psychological and philosophical themes through the human figure, often incorporating research from medical and neuroscientific disciplines. She engages with questions of identity, emotion, and possible futures, working across sculpture, installation, poetry, and drawing.

== Work ==
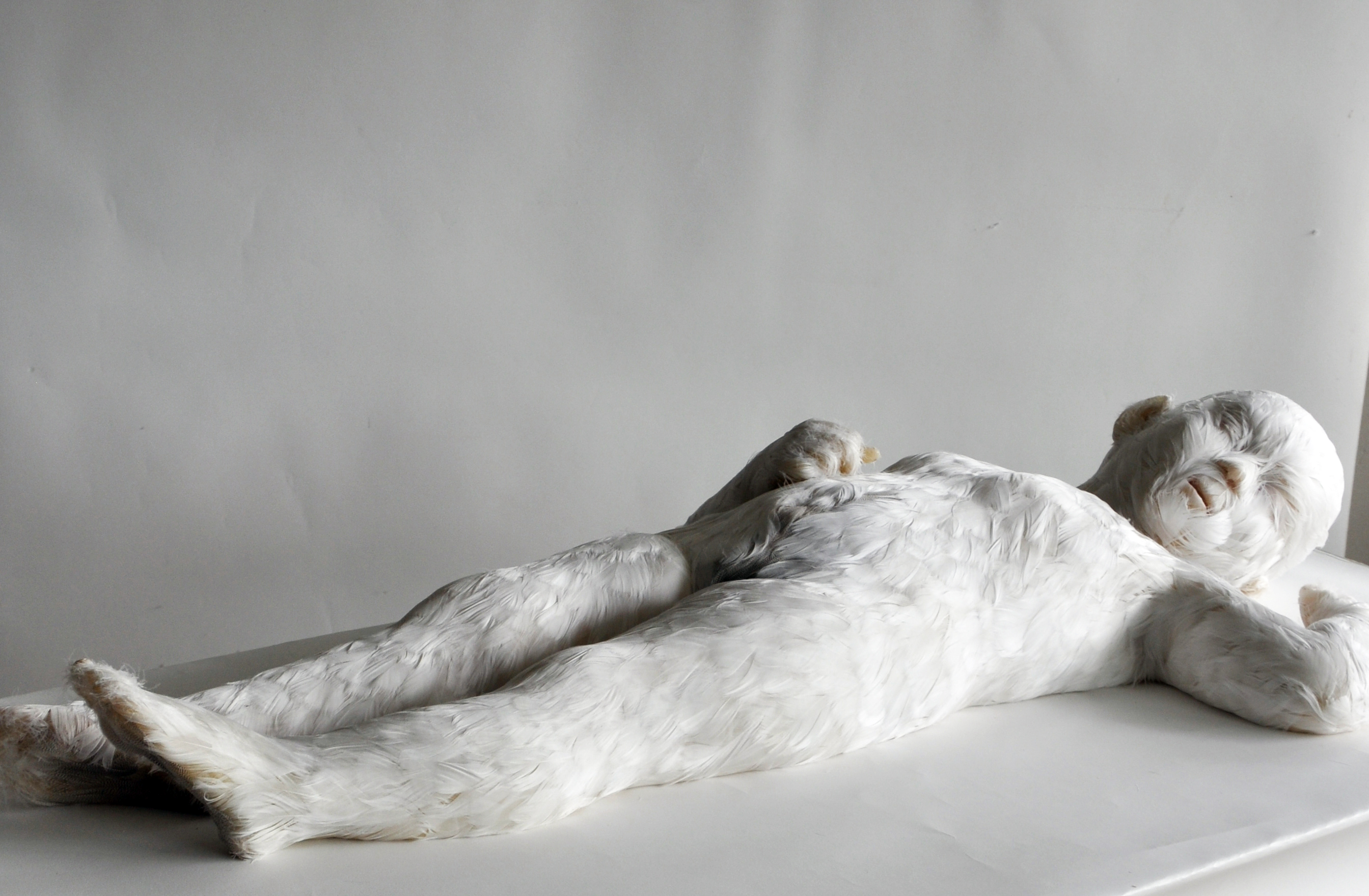
Feather Child 4

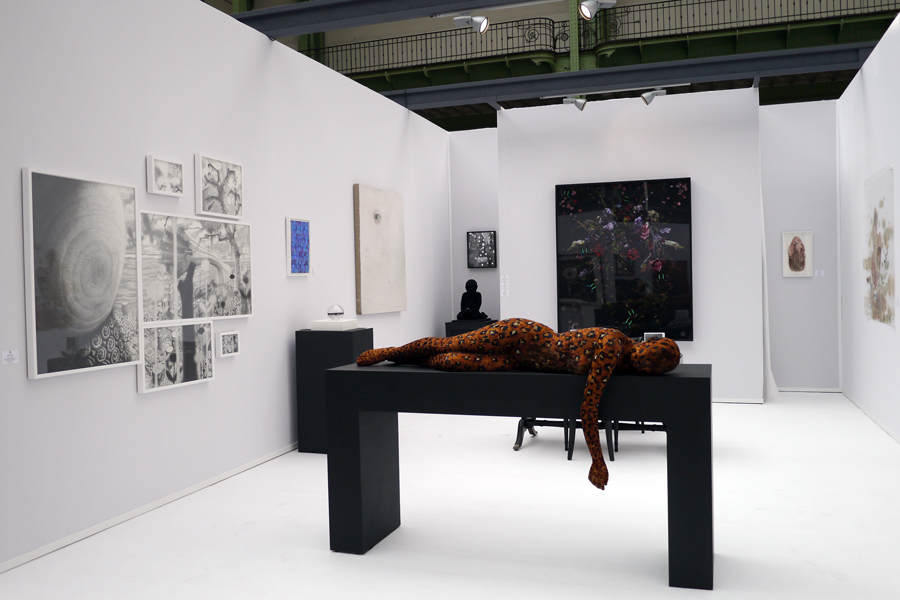
The Girl in Her Dreams Da-End Gallery Art Pairs

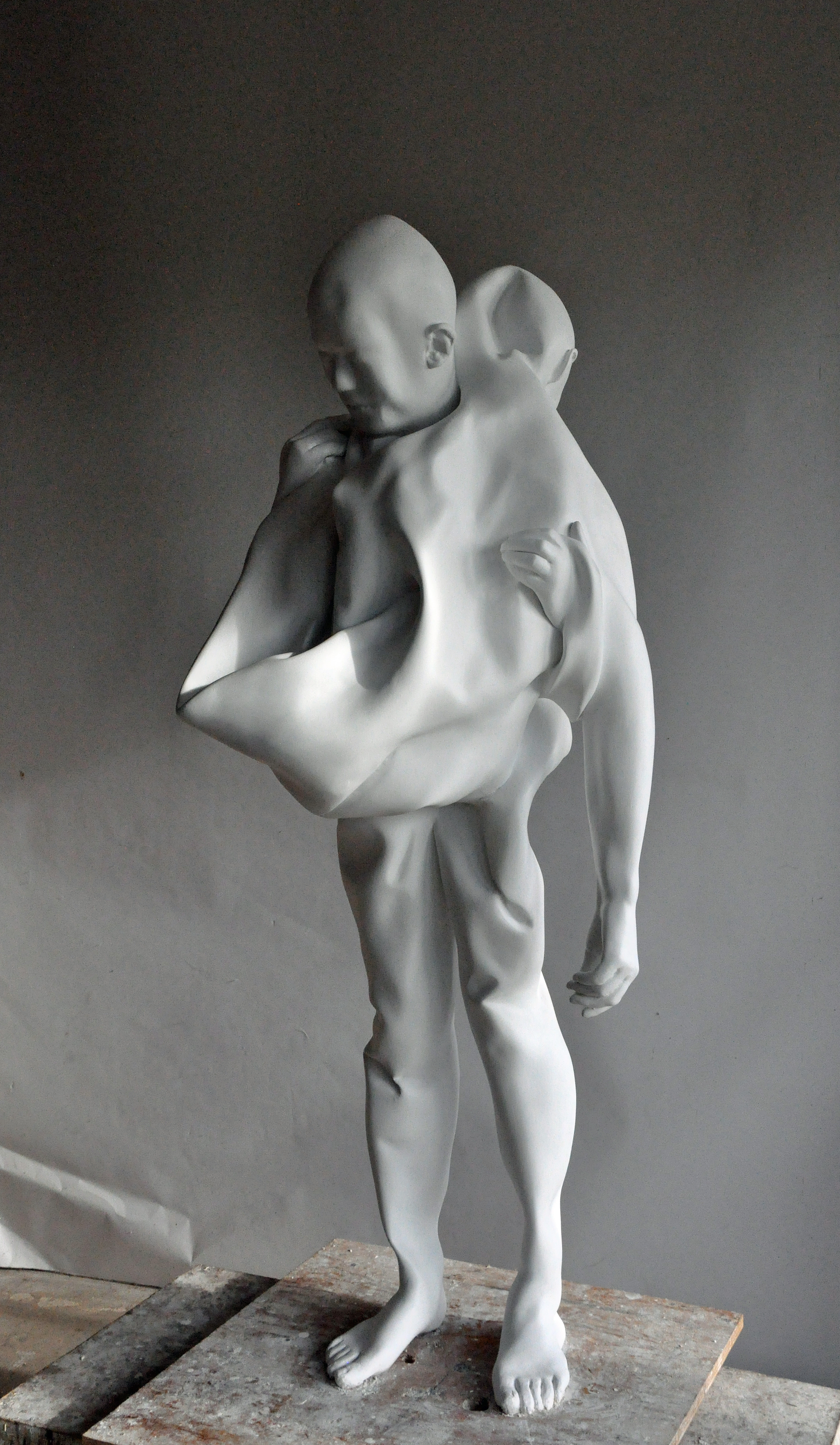
Together GSA Gallery Stockholm

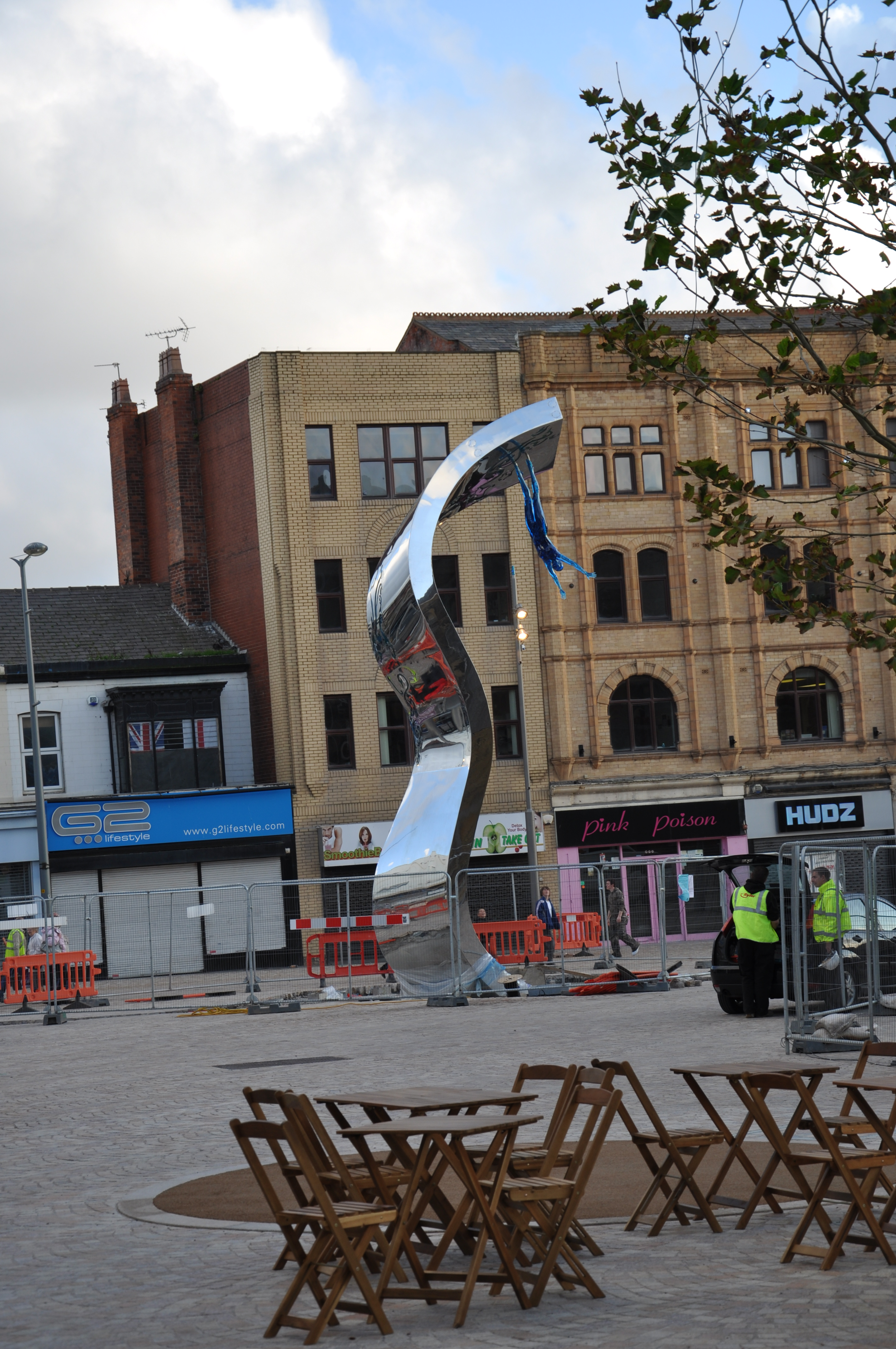
The Wave Saint Johns Square Blackpool

She is known for her Feather Child series, which originates from her fascination with visions of a future society. The feathered children are embodied questions: in a world where genetics can be freely manipulated, will we resist altering our physical abilities? Will necessity or vanity prevail? Will we act collectively or as individuals? The fragility of the feathers evokes the myth of Icarus, suggesting both aspiration and hubris.

Glendinning was elected a Fellow of the Royal Society of Sculptors in 2024. She is currently collaborating with neuroscientist Lauri Nummenmaa at the Nummenmaa Lab at The University of Turku in Turku , Finland. Their project, Anatomy of Emotions, investigates the visual language of emotions through interdisciplinary research and experimental media.

She had her first solo exhibition in 1994 and has exhibited widely, including solo shows at Gallery GSA in Stockholm and Umeå Feather Child 2012, Identity of shadows 2021, Galerie Da-End in Paris I am not 2013 Only Human 2018 and Villa Tamaris Centre d’Art in France (2018). Her group exhibitions include Hybriden at Art Center De Warande (2024), with Berlinde De Bruyckere and Nick Cave ; Naked – The Vulnerable Body at Museum Kranenburgh, Netherlands, with Matthew Day Jackson and Maurizio Cattelan; 'Forever in the now' 2022 with James Capper, Laura Ford, Nigel Hall, Sean Henry, Nicola Hicks, Simon Hitchens, Kenny Hunter, David Mach, Eilis O'Connell, Richard Perry, David Worthington. Das Hubris Project at Halle 14 with Narda Alvarado, Chim↑Pom, Ursula Damm,Bjørn Melhus, and Pinar Yoldas; the Borås Konstmuseum Biennale with Erwin Wurm,Elmgreen & Dragset, Xavier Veilhan, Jaume Plensa, and Tony Cragg; and my dear swan at ACC Gallery Weimar with Sam Taylor-Johnson and Peter Kees.

== Public Commissions ==
- Angel Fields (2010), a garden sculpture for Liverpool Hope University, Liverpool, commissioned by BCA Landscape
- Anne (2009), Saint Anne's Square, Belfast, commissioned by the Art and Business Trust
- The Wave (2009), Saint John's Square, outside the Winter Gardens, Blackpool, supported by Blackpool Council and EU funding
- Life (2007), Jennett's Park, Bracknell, for Persimmon and Redrow Homes
- Riding a Wave (2006), Drakes Circus,Plymouth, commissioned by P&O Estates
- Flight (2006), Waterside Square, Portishead, Somerset, for Persimmon Homes
- Discovery (2005), a memorial to Francis Crick in Northampton, commissioned by Northampton Borough Council and the Wilson Foundation
- Memorial to John Smith (2003), Wincanton, for South Somerset District Council
- Wincanton Sports Centre (2001), Wincanton, for South Somerset District Council
- Wells Bridge (1999), part of the Glastonbury–Wells traffic-free route for Sustrans
- Hartlepool Dockland Sea Wall (1991), commissioned as part of the Hartlepool dockland development
