= Jeffrey Thomson =

Jeffrey Thomson (or variants) may refer to:

- Jeff Thomson (b. 1950), cricketer
- Jeffery Thompson (b. 1986), American football player and writer
- Jeffrey Thomson (artist), awarded Frances Hodgkins Fellowship
- Geoff Thomson, cricketer

== See also ==
- Jeff Thompson (disambiguation)
- Geoff Thompson (disambiguation)
