= Jeff Thompson =

Jeff Thompson may refer to:

- M. Jeff Thompson (1826–1876), brigadier general in the Missouri State Guard during the American Civil War
- Jeff Thompson (Indiana politician), Republican member of the Indiana House of Representatives
- Jeff Thompson (Idaho politician) (born 1963), Republican member of the Idaho House of Representatives
- Jeff R. Thompson (born 1965), Republican member of the Louisiana House of Representatives
- Jeff Thompson (coach) (born 1961), American artistic gymnastics coach

== See also ==
- Geoff Thompson (disambiguation)
- Jeff Thomson (born 1950), Australian cricketer
- Jeffrey Thomson (disambiguation)
