= Geoff Thompson =

Geoff or Geoffrey Thompson may refer to:

- Geoffrey Thompson (British Army officer) (1905–1983), British Army general
- Geoffrey Hewlett Thompson (1929–2025), British Anglican bishop
- Geoffrey Thompson (businessman) (1936–2004), owner and managing director of Blackpool Pleasure Beach
- Geoff Thompson (politician) (1940–2026), New Zealand Member of Parliament
- Geoff Thompson (football executive) (born 1945), British football administrator, chairman of The Football Association
- Geoffrey Thompson (doctor) (born 1945), Australian sports physician
- Geoff Thompson (writer) (born 1960), British writer and self-defence instructor
- Geoff Thompson (karateka), British karate fighter
- Geoff Thompson (snooker player) (born 1929), English snooker player
- Geoffrey Harington Thompson (1898–1967), British diplomat

== See also ==
- Geoff Thomson (born 1959), Australian cricketer
- Jeff Thompson (disambiguation)
- Jeffrey Thomson (disambiguation)
