= Frank Szirmay =

Frank Szirmay (1916–1985) was a Hungarian New Zealand sculptor. In 1956 Szirmay fled the Hungarian revolt with his family, and they emigrated to New Zealand. Szirmay's step-daughter is well-known sculptor Marté Szirmay.

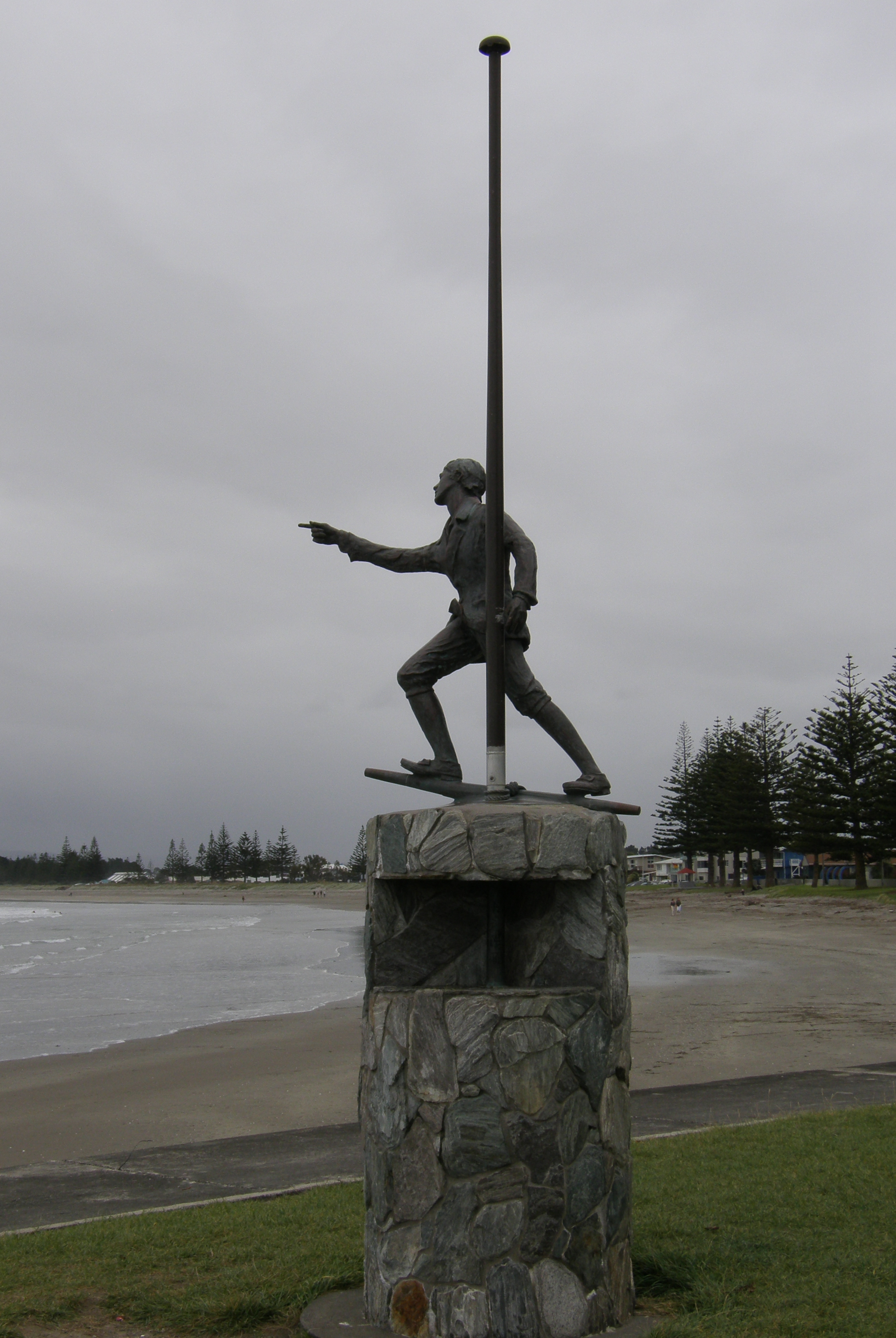
Young Nick statue, Gisborne.

== Biography ==
Szirmay began his career as a painter, but in the 1970s gained a national reputation as a sculptor of bronze figures in the Academic Realist tradition. Szirmay taught art, and one of his most well-known pupils was Les Gibbard. Szirmay's figurative sculptural style can be seen in a number of notable public commissions around New Zealand.

== Notable works ==
=== Young Nick ===
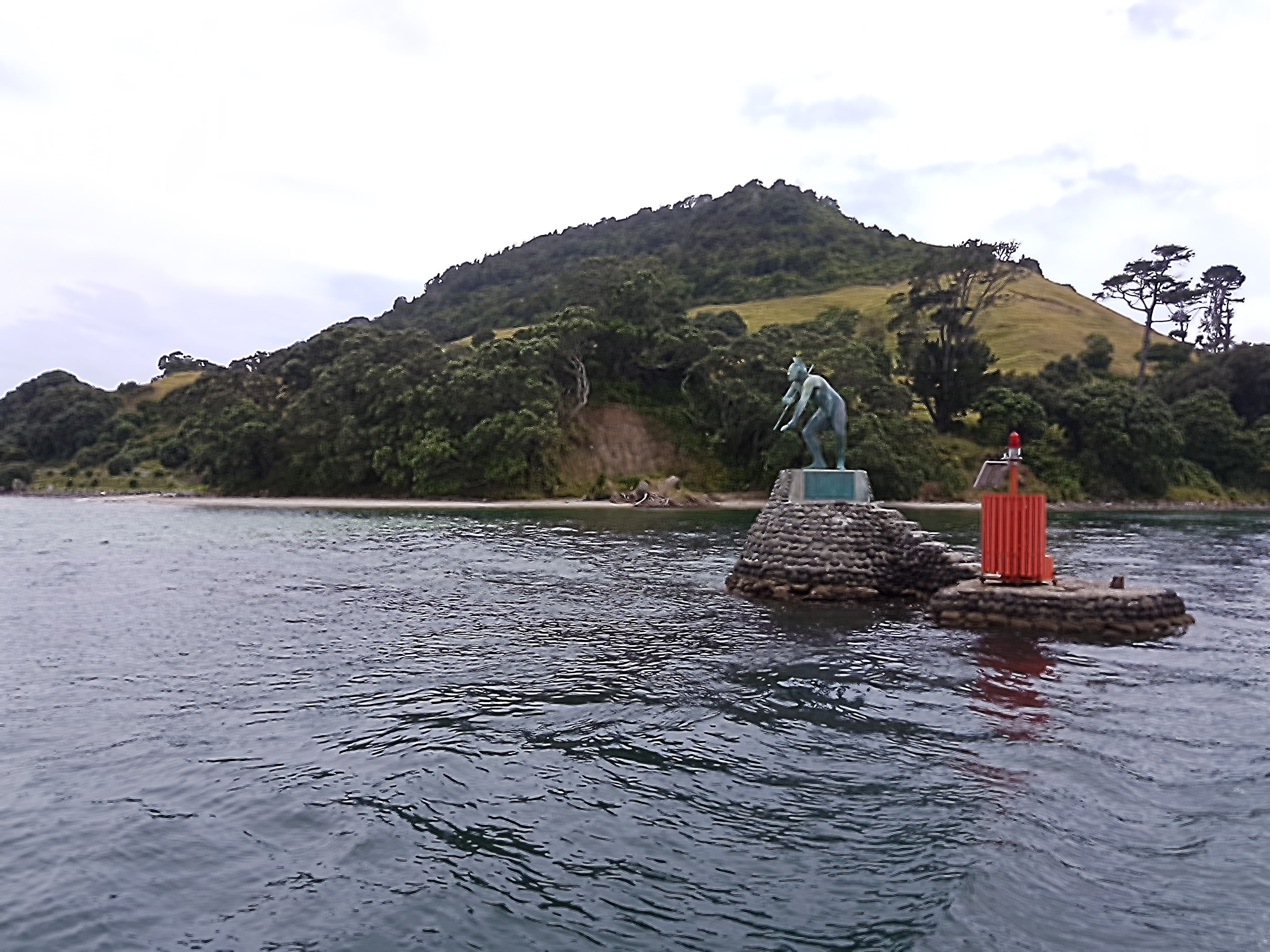
Frank Szirmay'a representation of Tangaroa in bronze with Mount Maunganui in the background.

Young Nick - bronze figure of Nicholas Young, unveiled in 1969 by Governor-General Sir Arthur Porritt at Churchill Park on Waikanae Beach, Gisborne as part of the Cook Bicentenary Celebrations, which commemorated the first sighting of New Zealand on James Cook's voyage in 1769. The statue was gifted by the New Zealand Insurance Company. In 1988 the statue was moved to the mouth of the Tūranganui River, and is now positioned so that Young Nick points to Young Nick's Head across the bay.

=== Tangaroa ===
Tangaroa - bronze figure of Tangaroa, Māori God of the sea, installed in 1969. The status is situated at the entrance to Tauranga Harbour. Tangaroa is portrayed as a crouching warrior grasping a taiaha, and in recent years was moved to face harbour visitors.

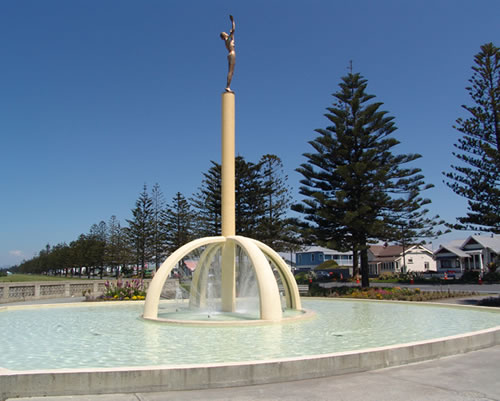
The Gilray Fountain, better known as the Spirit of Napier, along Marine Parade in Napier, New Zealand.

=== The Spirit of Napier ===
The Spirit of Napier - bronze figure of a slender 'golden girl', with arms upraised on a high column. This work was installed in 1971 and memorialises Napier's rebirth after the devastating earthquake of 1931. The statue was gifted to the city by the late Dr Thomas Gilray, a former superintendent of the Napier Hospital. In 2011 it was taken down by the Napier Council to be repaired after bronze rot was discovered.

=== The Discovery of New Zealand Chess Set ===
Another notable commission was a chess set, titled The Discovery of New Zealand Chess Set, which depicts a peaceful meeting between Māori and Europeans, and was another work commissioned to commemorate the Cook Bicentenary. This work is held in the collection of Museum of New Zealand Te Papa Tongarewa.
