= Marté Szirmay =

Hungarian-New Zealand artist (born 1946)

- Born: 1945 (age 80–81); Budapest, Hungary
- Education: Elam School of Fine Arts, University of Auckland
- Known for: sculpture
- Awards: Frances Hodgkins Fellowship
- Website: www.marteszirmay.co.nz

Marté Szirmay (born 1946) is a Hungarian New Zealand artist whose works are held in the collections of the Auckland Art Gallery Toi o Tāmaki and Museum of New Zealand Te Papa Tongarewa.

== Biography ==
=== Early life ===
Szirmay was born in Budapest, Hungary, in 1946. Fearing Russian repression after the Hungarian revolt, Szirmay's parents emigrated to New Zealand in 1957. Her step-father Frank Szirmay began his artistic career as a painter, but by the 1970s he gained a reputation as a sculptor of bronze figures. Frank Szirmay's most notable public sculptures include Young Nick (Gisborne), Tangaroa (Tauranga), and The Spirit of Napier (Napier).

Szirmay attended Auckland Girls' Grammar School from 1960 to 1964, where she preferred the sciences, and then studied at Elam School of Fine Arts, graduating in 1968 with a diploma of Fine Arts with First Class Honours. While studying at Elam, Jim Allen encouraged Szirmay to major in sculpture rather than painting. Szirmay's interest in science from school influenced her later sculptures which centred around the imagery of organic living forms, such as shells, eggs, seed pods, fossils. For her, sculpture is a means of "paying homage to the organic."

I aim to create a language of signs and symbols that transcend regional, cultural and social limitations. I am a long-time advocate for the protection and health of our planet Earth and promote unconditional love and respect for all her sentient beings. While we are debating the rapid disintegration of our planet, not all accept that we as a human race are in any way responsible for the plunder, exploitation and pollution of her.

Szirmay gained a teaching qualification in 1969 from the Auckland College of Education, and continued to teach art in secondary schools and university extension programmes.

=== Career ===
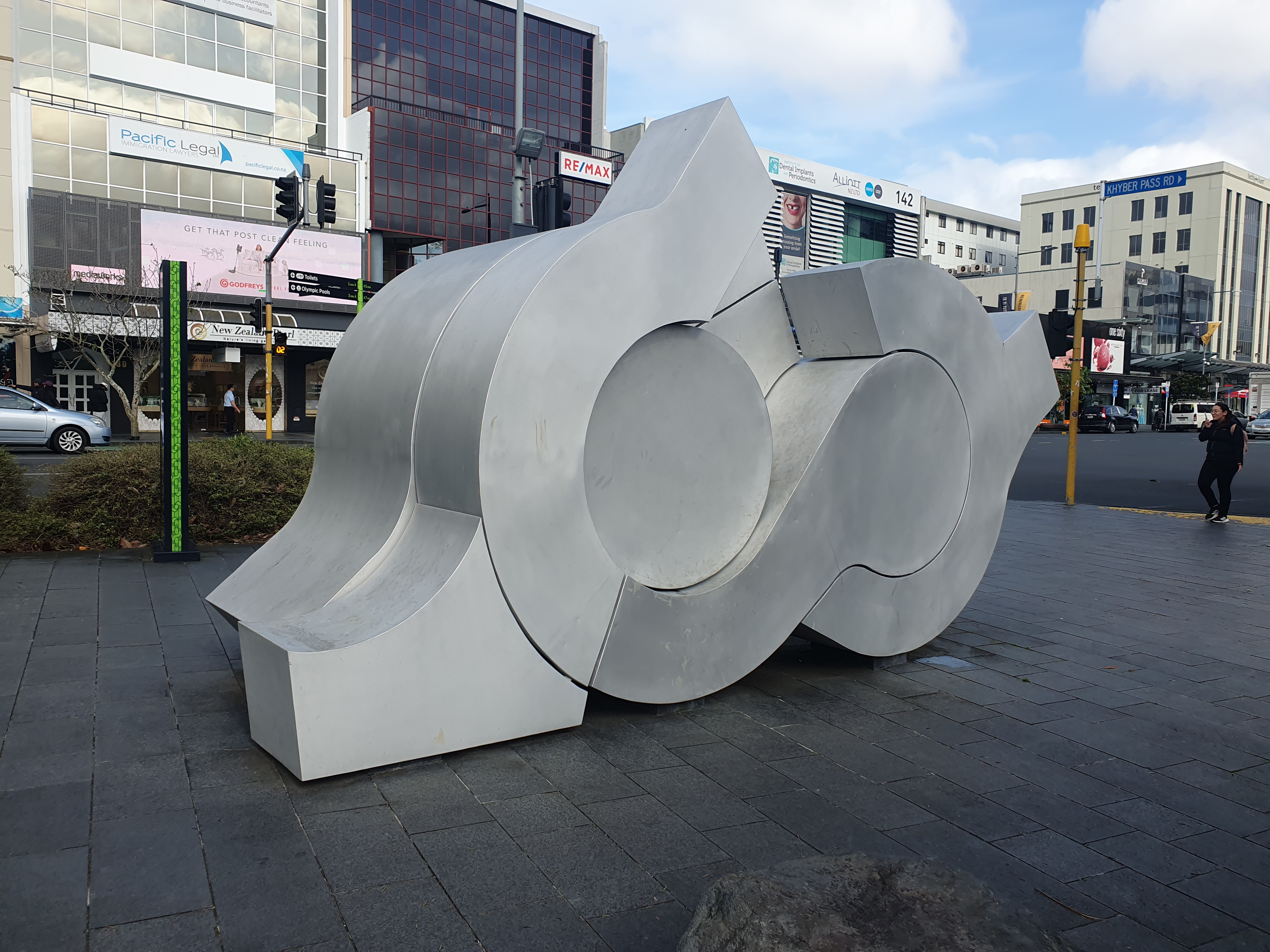
The Smirnoff Centenary Sculpture (1969) in Newmarket, Auckland, New Zealand

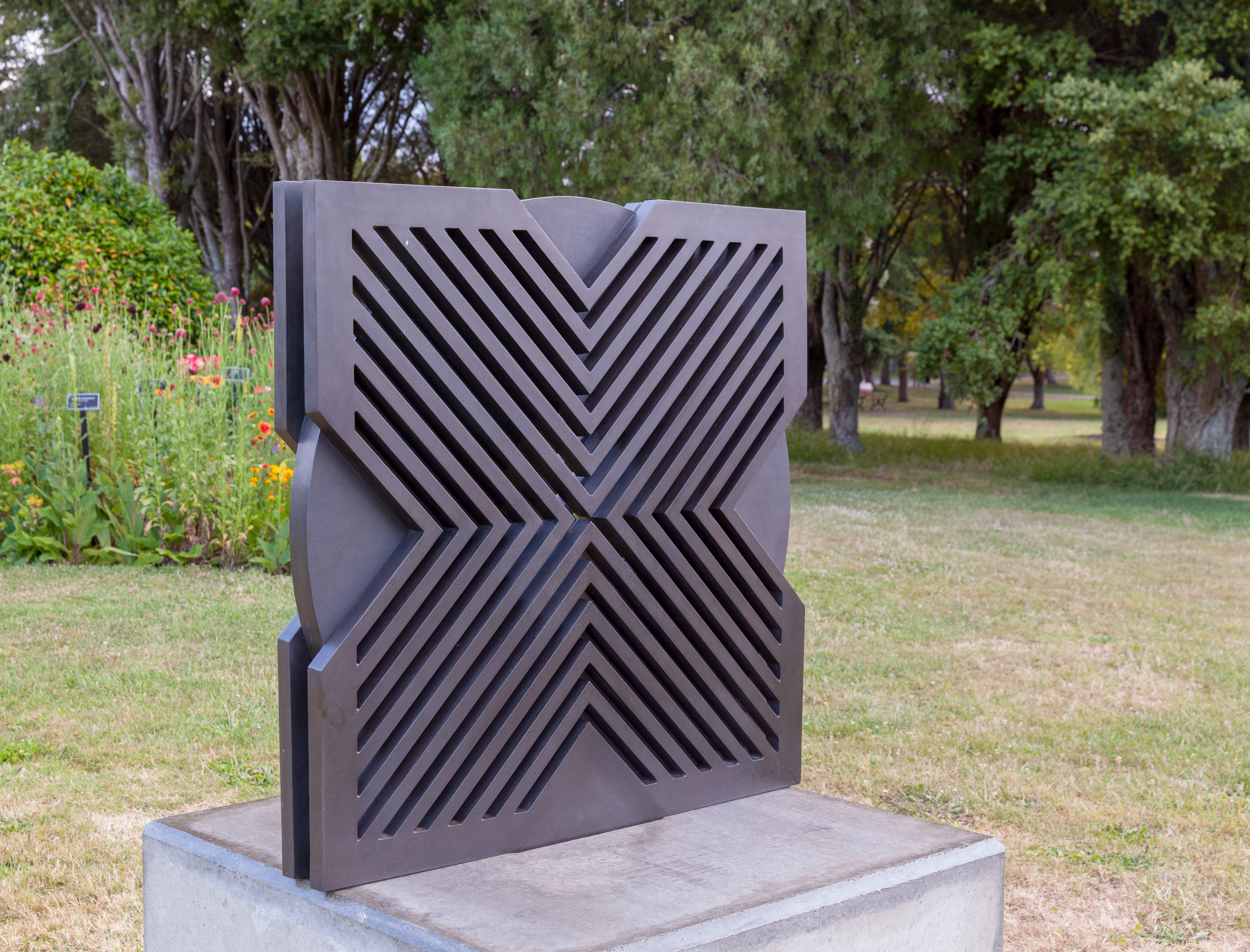
Seek (2015), a sculpture in the Auckland Botanic Gardens, New Zealand

After graduating from Elam, Szirmay won the Smirnoff Sculpture Award (1969) for a monumental outdoor piece rendered in curved, polished aluminium in the busy centre of Newmarket, Auckland. This work was fabricated to her instructions by Roskill Sheet Metal Works. This work represented a radical move for public art in Auckland, and it was the first large abstract work to be commissioned for the city. The brutalist look and feel and utilitarian construction was designed to remind passersby of the industrial history of Newmarket and the highly reflective surfaces were intended to mirror the hustle and bustle of the surrounding streets. It is located beside Lumsden Green, close to the Khyber Pass Road–Broadway intersection at Newmarket, counterpoised with Virginia King's Sliver across the pedestrian crossing. For nearly ten years, Szirmay continued to work with metal as her preferred medium.

Following the Smirnoff Sculpture, Szirmay carried out a series of public commissions for institutions and corporations, most of these in aluminium or stainless steel. These included works for the University of Auckland's medical school, and a work for the University of Otago Medical School, both in 1975. One of Szirmay's most ambitious public commissions was in 1987 for the Chase Plaza, Auckland. The work, featuring running water and steel construction, was unfortunately dismantled when the Chase Corporation went bust during the stock market crash of the late 1980s.

Szirmay's early sculptural works were influenced by the Russian Constructivists' dynamic view of the universe, which was in turn influenced by early physics discoveries. Since 1969, Szirmay has had multiple solo exhibitions within New Zealand, and participated in group exhibitions internationally. Beginning with her cast-aluminium group shown at the Canterbury Society of Arts Gallery in 1971, Szirmay has worked in series.

Szirmay was awarded the Frances Hodgkins Fellowship for 1971 and 1972. In the two years following, Szirmay travelled to Europe, and while in Britain she was in touch with sculptor Anthony Caro who may have prompted her to investigate the use of colour in her work.

Szirmay's show of sculpture at New Vision Gallery during April and May 1978 confirmed her position as one of New Zealand's leading sculptors. The works she presented were divided into two categories – aluminium sheetmetal works and a newer method of ground marble cast with resin. One of Szirmay's notable solo exhibitions was Sculpture 81 (1981) at the Hocken Gallery.

Szirmay held the presidency of the New Zealand Society of Sculptors and Associates from 1977 to 1978, and again from 1985 to approximately 1989. In 1989, Szirmay was a founding member of the Medal Artists of New Zealand, a group which celebrates and champions the work of medal artists.

Szirmay continues to produce work, and in recent years has participated in numerous outdoor sculpture exhibitions and competitions around New Zealand. In 2015, she was a winner of a Sculpture in the Gardens award, and her work Seek was purchased for the permanent collection of Auckland Botanic Gardens – it can be found in the Rose Garden.
