= J. S. Parker =

New Zealand painter (1944–2017)

J. S. Parker ONZM
- Born: John Shotton Parker; 21 December 1944; Auckland, New Zealand
- Died: 14 August 2017 (aged 72); Blenheim, New Zealand
- Education: Ilam School of Fine Arts, University of Canterbury
- Known for: Large-scale colour field abstracts
- Notable work: Plain Song for Ralph (the Hotere canvas) (2016)
- Spouse: Kate Parker
- Awards: Frances Hodgkins Fellowship

"Plain Song: Light Through Pine Green Darkness" (2017), by J. S. Parker

John Shotton Parker ONZM (21 December 1944 – 14 August 2017), known professionally as J. S. Parker, was a New Zealand painter.

Parker was born in Auckland, but spent most of his life living in Blenheim. He studied art at Christchurch's Ilam School of Fine Arts, graduating in 1966, and had his first exhibition in 1967. He became an art teacher at Blenheim's Marlborough Girls' College in 1970 whilst also pursuing his own art. In 1975, he was named Frances Hodgkins Fellow at the University of Otago.

During his time as Hodgkins fellow he became friends with former Fellowship recipient Ralph Hotere, who became Parker's unofficial artistic mentor. Parker later honoured his late friend with the massive 2016 work Plain Song for Ralph (the Hotere canvas), which was painted on canvas which had previously been owned by Hotere. Hotere's art influenced Parker's, though Parker's paintings were aimed more at evoking an "emotional response from the viewer, rather than conveying a message".

Parker's work progressed from photographs and drawings to oil pastels, before he began working in oil paint on large canvases, the medium for which he is best known. His key works are large-scale colour field abstracts inspired by the Marlborough landscape that surrounds Blenheim. His most well-known series of works was the extended Plain Song series, which he worked on from the 1980s until his death. These works were an attempt to express the colours of the Marlborough landscape in musical terms, "creating a symphonic tone poem in paint [...], with bold, heavily impastoed canvases which nevertheless have both subtle delicacy and a rigorous use of geometry".

In the 2002 Queen's Birthday and Golden Jubilee Honours, Parker was appointed a New Zealand Order of Merit, for services to painting. He was later named the 2014 Marlborough Living Cultural Treasure. Parker's life and work was celebrated in the 2009 book J.S. Parker: Plain song, written by art historian Damian Skinner.

Parker died from cancer on 14 August 2017.
