= Statue of Katherine Mansfield =

Statue in Wellington, New Zealand

Woman of Words
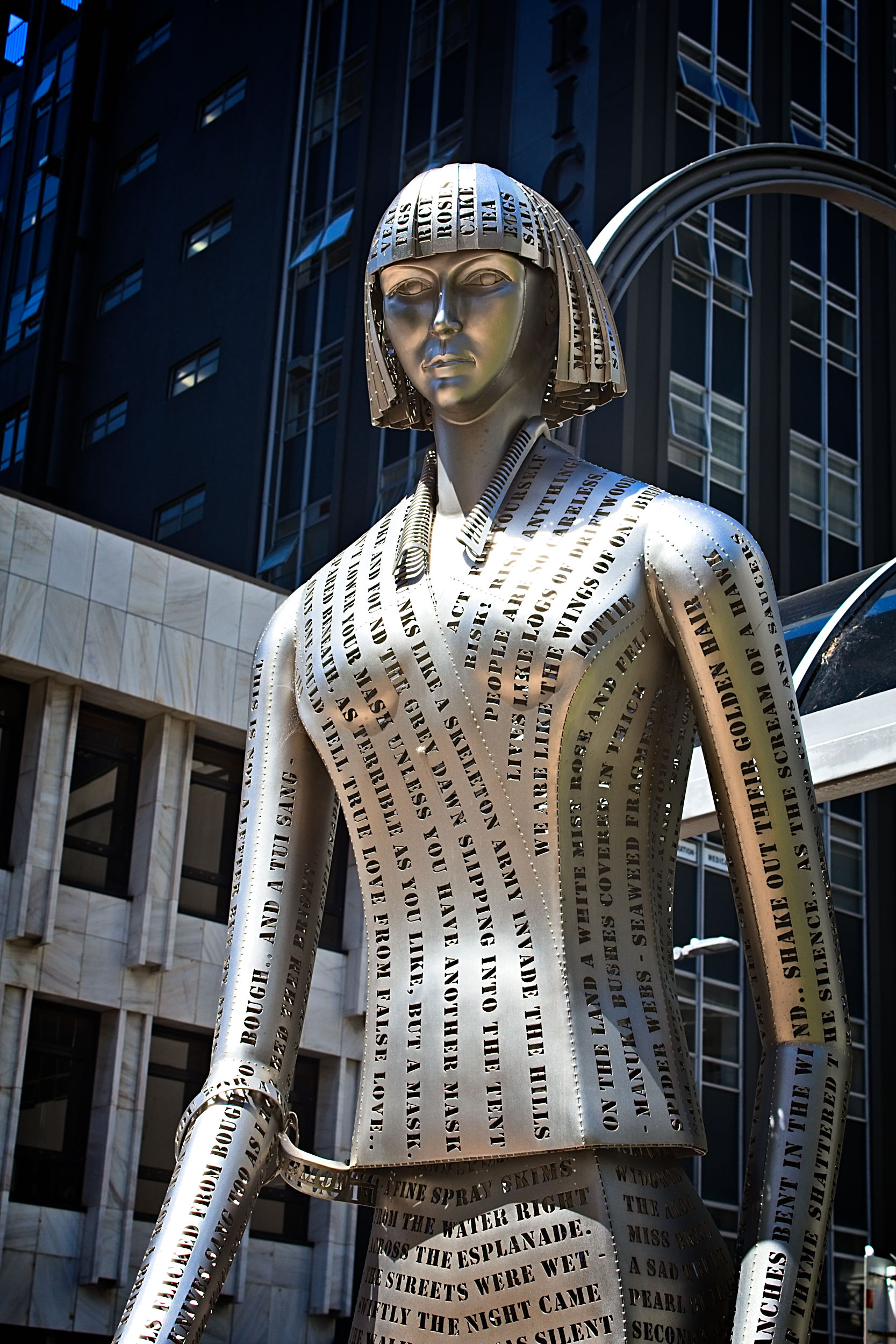
- Artist: Virginia King
- Year: 2013
- Type: steel
- Dimensions: 3.3 m (11 ft)
- Location: Wellington, New Zealand

Woman of Words is a statue of Katherine Mansfield located in Midland Park on Lambton Quay, Wellington, New Zealand, and honours the life of New Zealand writer Katherine Mansfield.

The statue project was a joint commission between the Wellington Sculpture Trust, the Katherine Mansfield Society and the Wellington City Council. Part of the funding was provided by the Nikau Foundation, on behalf of the Richard and Doreen Evans Charitable Trust; other funding was provided by Apex Properties, Todd Corporation, Wellington Community Trust, Mark McGuiness and Jon Craig. It was unveiled in May 2013 by Wellington's Mayor, Celia Wade-Brown.

The statue is the work of New Zealand sculptor Virginia King. The statue is made of stainless steel and embellished with words and from Mansfield's writing. At night the statue is lit up from inside.
