= Nicholas Young (sailor) =

British cabin boy

Nicholas Young (born c. 1757) was a British cabin boy aboard the Endeavour during Captain James Cook's first voyage of discovery. In 1769, Cook named the headland Young Nick's Head in Poverty Bay, New Zealand after him. In The Remarkable Story of Andrew Swan, (Note: Swan, Andrew; Macfadyen, Dugald (1933) The remarkable story of Andrew Swan : being a record of his experiences, of his shipwreck, and of his many escapes from death during forty-four years of wandering adventures by land and sea / told by himself and written down by Dugald Macfadyen. London : Hodder and Stoughton. p 143.) it is stated that Young hailed from Greenock, on the Clyde.

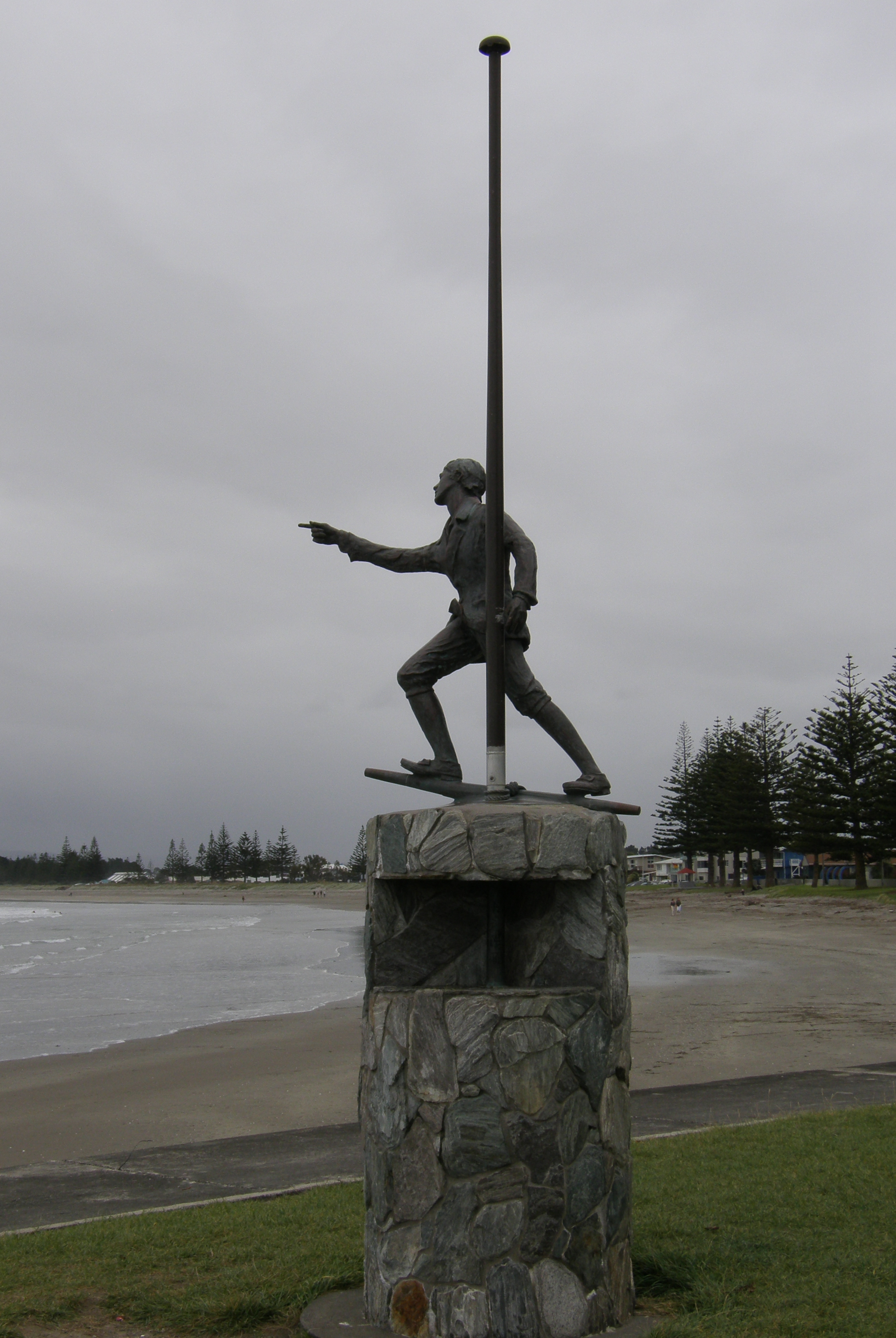
Bronze statue of "Young Nick" at Waikanae Beach, Gisborne.

== On Captain Cook's Endeavour ==
Young was eleven years old when the Endeavour departed Plymouth, England on 26 August 1768. He was the personal servant of the Endeavour’s surgeon, William Brougham Monkhouse. In early October 1769, Cook offered a reward of rum to the man who first sighted land, and promised that 'that part of the coast of the said land should be named after him'. This was awarded to Young who first sighted land from the masthead at about 2pm on 6 October 1769.

About 2 o'clock in the afternoon, one of our people, Nicholas Young, the surgeon's boy, descried a point of land of New Zealand from the starboard bow at about nine leagues distance bearing west by north. We bore up to it and, at sunset, we had a good view of it. The land was high and appeared like an island. We regaled ourselves in the evening on the occasion. The land was called ‘Young Nick's Head,’ and the boy received his reward.

— Sydney Parkinson, botanical artist aboard the Endeavour,

After Young returned to Plymouth in July 1771, he became the servant of the Endeavour's botanist, Joseph Banks. In 1772, Young accompanied Banks on an expedition to Iceland, but nothing further is known about his life.

== Legacy ==
On 10 October 1969, a bronze statue of Nicholas Young was unveiled by Governor-General Sir Arthur Porritt at Churchill Park on Waikanae Beach, Gisborne, New Zealand as part of the Cook Bicentenary Celebrations. The monument, sculpted by Frank Szirmay, depicts Young pointing towards the white cliffs of Young Nicks Head.
