= Louise Menzies =

New Zealand artist (born 1981)

Louise Menzies (born 1981) is a New Zealand artist based in Auckland. Her works are held in the Auckland Art Gallery collection.

Menzies is known for her installations and artists books, and uses a cross-media practice which often incorporates film and print into performances and installations. She has produced a wide range of print-based works. Menzies has contributed writing to The Distance Plan, an exhibition platform and journal focusing on contemporary art and climate change.

== Awards and fellowships ==
- Iris Fisher Scholarship from Te Tuhi, 2012.
- University of Connecticut, 2014. In this residency, Menzies created an exhibition inspired by archival materials from The Alternative Press Collection from the Dodd research center at the University of Connecticut. Her exhibition was titled Time to Think Like a Mountain, and was presented in three ways: a series of works made from handmade paper with ephemera re-forged into a single document; works treating paper materials photographically; and a 16mm film.
- McCahon House Residency, May–July 2016.
- Frances Hodgkins Fellowship, 2018. Through this fellowship, Menzies explored two historical figures from Dunedin's art world – Frances Hodgkins and Joanna Margaret Paul, using the Hocken's collection of archives and ephemera. The fellowship culminated in her show, In an orange my mother was eating.

== Exhibitions ==
- In an orange my mother was eating, Hocken Collections, 2019.
- Gorgon Malkin Witch, Te Uru, 2017–2018.
- Freedom Farmers: New Zealand Artists Growing Ideas (group show), Auckland Art Gallery, 2013–2014.
- World, Business, Lifestyle, Sport, The Physics Room, 2013.
- Sculpture/Metal, Te Tuhi, 2012.
- Letters to Students of the Radiant Life, Adam Art Gallery, 2010. In conjunction with this exhibition, Menzies produced a book titled The Pursuit of an Ideal.
- Break: Towards a Public Realm (group show), Govett-Brewster Art Gallery, 2008–2009.
- The Blue Room: 13 Artists Respond in a Psychic Way (group show), Blue Oyster art project space, 2008.
- Sparkling Duets, The Physics Room, 2007.
- Shelter or Marquee, Enjoy, 2007.
- Every Now and Then (group show), Enjoy, 2006. Menzies' work in this show explored her feelings about the fountain located in Oriental Bay, Wellington.
