= Nicola Jackson (artist) =

New Zealand artist (born 1960)

- Born: 1960 (age 65–66); Dunedin, New Zealand
- Education: Ilam School of Fine Arts
- Known for: Painting
- Awards: Frances Hodgkins Fellowship

Nicola Jackson (born 1960) is a New Zealand artist, born in Dunedin.

Jackson is best known for her small, highly detailed and vividly coloured papier-mâché three dimensional paintings. She frequently references domestic life and female identity in a very subtle way, occasionally reaching over into the expressively grotesque and medical anatomical taxonomy.

Jackson studied at the Ilam School of Fine Arts at the University of Canterbury, focusing on sculpture and printmaking. She received a prestigious Goethe-Institut scholarship to study in Germany in 1992 and in 1994 she was awarded the Frances Hodgkins Fellowship from the University of Otago.

Exhibitions by Jackson include:

- Nicola Jackson: Through the Eye of the Needle (solo show), Robert McDougall Art Gallery, 1989
- Fresh Art (group show), Robert McDougall and the Govett-Brewster Art Gallery, 1985
- Gruesome! (group show), Robert McDougall Art Gallery, 1999
- Child's Play (group show), Robert McDougall Art Gallery, 1995
- The Bloggs (solo show), Dunedin Public Art Gallery, 2017

Works by Jackson are held in collections throughout New Zealand including the Museum of New Zealand Te Papa Tongarewa and Christchurch Art Gallery Te Puna o Waiwhetu.
