= Zina Swanson =

New Zealand artist

Zina Swanson (born 1981) is a New Zealand artist. Her works are held in the Christchurch Art Gallery, University of Canterbury and Hocken Collections.

Swanson was born in Christchurch in 1981. She graduated from the University of Canterbury School of Fine Arts with a BFA (Sculpture) in 2003. After losing her studio and most of her early art production in the Christchurch earthquakes she lived in Auckland briefly before arriving in Dunedin in 2013 to take up her tenure as the University of Otago's Frances Hodgkins Fellow. By 2020 she was based in Christchurch again, living with artist partner James Oram and working part-time at the University of Canterbury.

Swanson's work investigates the relationships between humans and the natural world.

== Awards and Residencies ==
- 2018 Inaugural recipient of the Grace Butler Art Award at Ara
- 2014 Apexart New York Inbound Resident - recommended by Justin Paton
- 2013 Frances Hodgkins Fellow
- 2004 The CoCA/Anthony Harper Award for Contemporary Art

== Exhibitions ==
Any Plant Thought of Too Much Will Not Thrive (2020), Sumer, Tauranga

Timely Additions (2019), Eastern Southland Gallery, Gore

For Luck (2015), Dunedin Public Art Gallery

No Need for Water: Zina Swanson (2014), Hocken Library

Ready to Roll (2010), City Gallery Wellington
