= Ben Cauchi =

New Zealand photographer (1974)

Ben Cauchi (born 1974, in Auckland, New Zealand) is a New Zealand fine art photographer, specialising in the use of early photographic techniques, most notably the wet collodion or ambrotype process.

Cauchi first became interested in early photography techniques and processes like daguerreotype and calotype through books he found while working at the Wellington Polytechnic library in the late 1990s. Cauchi was taught at Massey University from where he graduated in 2000. He was the University of Otago Frances Hodgkins Fellow in 2007, and in 2011 held the Rita Angus Cottage residency in Wellington. In the same year he won the 2011 New Zealand Arts Foundation New Generation award, The following year he took up the Creative New Zealand Berlin Visual Artists Residency at the Künstlerhaus Bethanien, and now spends much of his time in Berlin. He has exhibited throughout New Zealand since 2001, as well as in Australia, the United Kingdom, France, Germany, and the United States.
