= Jeff Thompson (coach) =

American artistic gymnastics coach (born 1961)

- Born: November 22, 1961 (age 64); Ft. Thomas, Kentucky, U.S.
- Education: Campbell County High School (Class of 1979)
- Alma mater: University of Kentucky (Class of 1986; 1995)
- Employer: Pennsylvania State University
- Spouse: Rachelle Thompson (m. 1992)
- Children: 2

Jeffrey Allen Thompson (born November 22, 1961) is an American artistic gymnastics coach. Coaching for thirty years, he has worked extensively on the NCAA collegiate scene but has also worked within club gymnastics. After holding assistant coach positions at Wisconsin-Madison, Illinois and Louisiana State for ten years, Thompson was appointed the head coach of the Auburn Tigers women's gymnastics program for the incoming 2000 season. He spent eleven seasons at Auburn, leading the Tigers to seven consecutive NCAA Regional appearances.
