= Jeff Thomson (artist) =

New Zealand sculptor

- Born: 1957 (age 68–69); Auckland, New Zealand
- Occupation: artist

Jeff Thomson (born 1957 in Auckland, New Zealand) is a New Zealand sculptor best known for his colourful sculptural works fabricated from corrugated iron. These range in size from a life-sized giraffe to gallery-friendly wall hangings.

== Education ==
Thomson was encouraged and inspired to become an artist by his art teacher Paul Dibble. Thomson studied at Elam School of Fine Arts, Auckland where he focused on painting and printmaking, he left in 1981 having obtained a Bachelor of Fine Arts. In 1982 he went on to study at Auckland Teachers College. After leaving teachers college he taught in secondary schools until 1986 before becoming a full time artist.

== Career ==
In 1980 Thomson took a break from art school and moved to Dunedin. Towards the end of 1980, he walked from there to Christchurch to attend his brother's wedding; the journey took 13 days. Along the way he observed the varieties of signage, weathered fence posts, mail boxes and other rural paraphernalia. Along the way he collected pieces of timber and signage from abandoned properties. He enjoyed the walk so much he completed another walk around East Cape that summer. On returning to art school in 1981 his tutor Don Binney encouraged him to make these walks part of his practice and to continue recording them. In 1981 he walked from Bulls to New Plymouth along the way through the rural countryside he left messages in letter boxes offering to make a piece of art for the owner. He left 350 messages and received 7 responses. Working at home he cut shapes out of plywood and screen printed images on them. He then returned and installed the resulting sculpture for the owners.

In 1982 Thomson had his first solo exhibition at the Auckland dealer gallery RKS Art, where he exhibited his mailbox sculptures. At this exhibition he met Jenny Neligan who booked him for an exhibition at her Bowen Galleries in Wellington in 1984. Neligan went on to become his gallerist for more than 30 years. For one of the mailboxes in this exhibition he had used corrugated iron for the first time to create a silhouette of a cow. A Wellington couple attracted to the corrugated iron mailbox commissioned three corrugated iron animals for their garden, this was the start of the long line of animals for which he has become well known.

In 1985 he was commissioned by James Wallace to produce a herd of elephants' silhouettes in corrugated iron to act as a fence to replace trees that had been felled without consultation by a neighbour. Before they were installed permission was given for them to be temporarily installed in Albert Park, where they became a major draw card for the public.

Thomson began working as an artist full-time in 1986. Thomson's animals became widely known, and in 1987 he was invited to be the artist in residence at the Sydney Festival. This led to his work being shown in Canberra, Adelaide and Brisbane. Animals remain a core part of his practice, with pieces spread across Australasia, the US and Europe. Most of Thomson's sculptures are not lifelike; one exception is Giraffe which is made to resemble the real giraffes it shares a home with at Gibbs Farm in Kaipara Harbour.

In 1990 Thomson re-clad a 1974 HQ-Holden with his signature corrugated iron. He had rescued the iron from a recycling yard following a fire that gutted the Criterion Hotel in Napier. The resulting vehicle was roadworthy and toured the country before finally becoming part of the Museum of New Zealand Te Papa Tongarewa permanent collection. In addition to the Holden Thomson has clad two other cars a Morris 1000 and a Mini Minor.

Thomson was awarded the Frances Hodgkins Fellowship at Otago University in 1995.

Thomson's early works were all constructed from flat sections arranged at angles to give a perception of depth. In 1988 he acquired a secondhand rolling machine designed to work with corrugated iron, this allowed him to work in three dimensions. Another new technique was learnt by watching Maori weavers who use flax to make baskets and other items, he adopted their techniques to allow him to produce similar items from strips of corrugated iron.

Thomson won awards at both the 2013 and 2015 World of Wearable Art competition.

In 2008 he was the Artist in Residence at the International Arts Festival held at the Château de Padiès in the South of France. While there he put his metal rolling and corrugating machinery to a new uses. He sandwiched a layer of hay between wire mesh and then rolled and corrugated the sandwich as if it was roofing iron. The resulting collection of shapes was placed among the hay bales in the grounds around the Château. On his return to New Zealand in 2009 he was commissioned to produce a temporary sculpture at the Connells Bay Sculpture Park using the same techniques.

== Public works and commissions ==
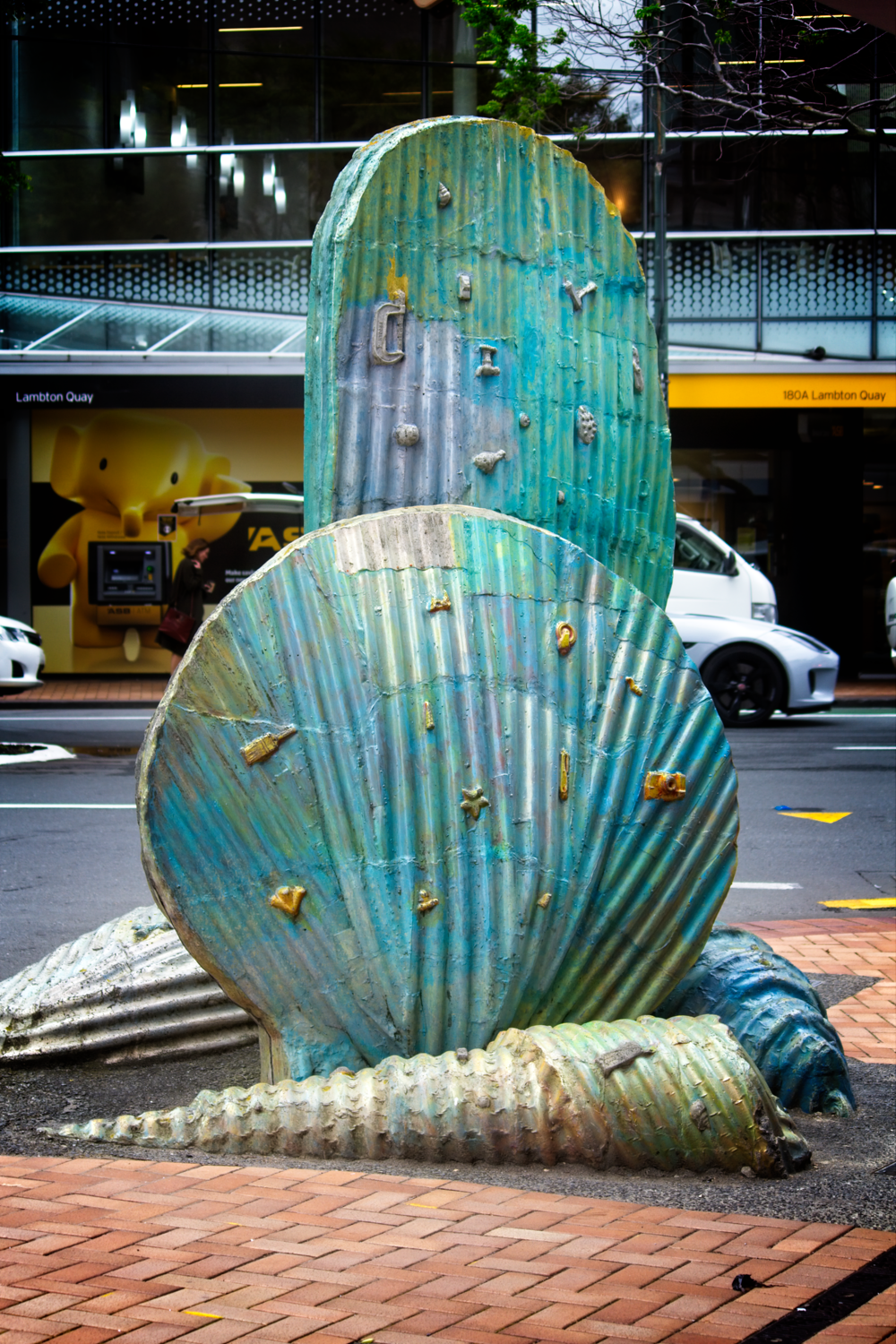
Shells, Lambton Quay, Wellington

- 2000 Gumboot, Taihape
- 2002 Massey Leisure Centre and Library, Westgate Shopping Centre, Auckland
- 2003 Shells, Lambton Quay, Wellington
- 2004 Plains, Northland Mall, Papanui Christchurch
- 2010 Words, Birkenhead, Public library, Auckland
- 2010 Helensville Toilets, Helensville, Auckland
- 2011 Milford Panels, Milford Village Plaza, Auckland
- 2012 Kaipara Panels, Helensville, Auckland
- 2011-2013 Noise Wall, State Highway 16, Auckland, commission by New Zealand Transport Agency Waka Kotahi
