= Young Nick's Head =

Headland in New Zealand

Young Nick's Head / Te Kurī Te Kuri o Pāoa (Māori)
- Headland
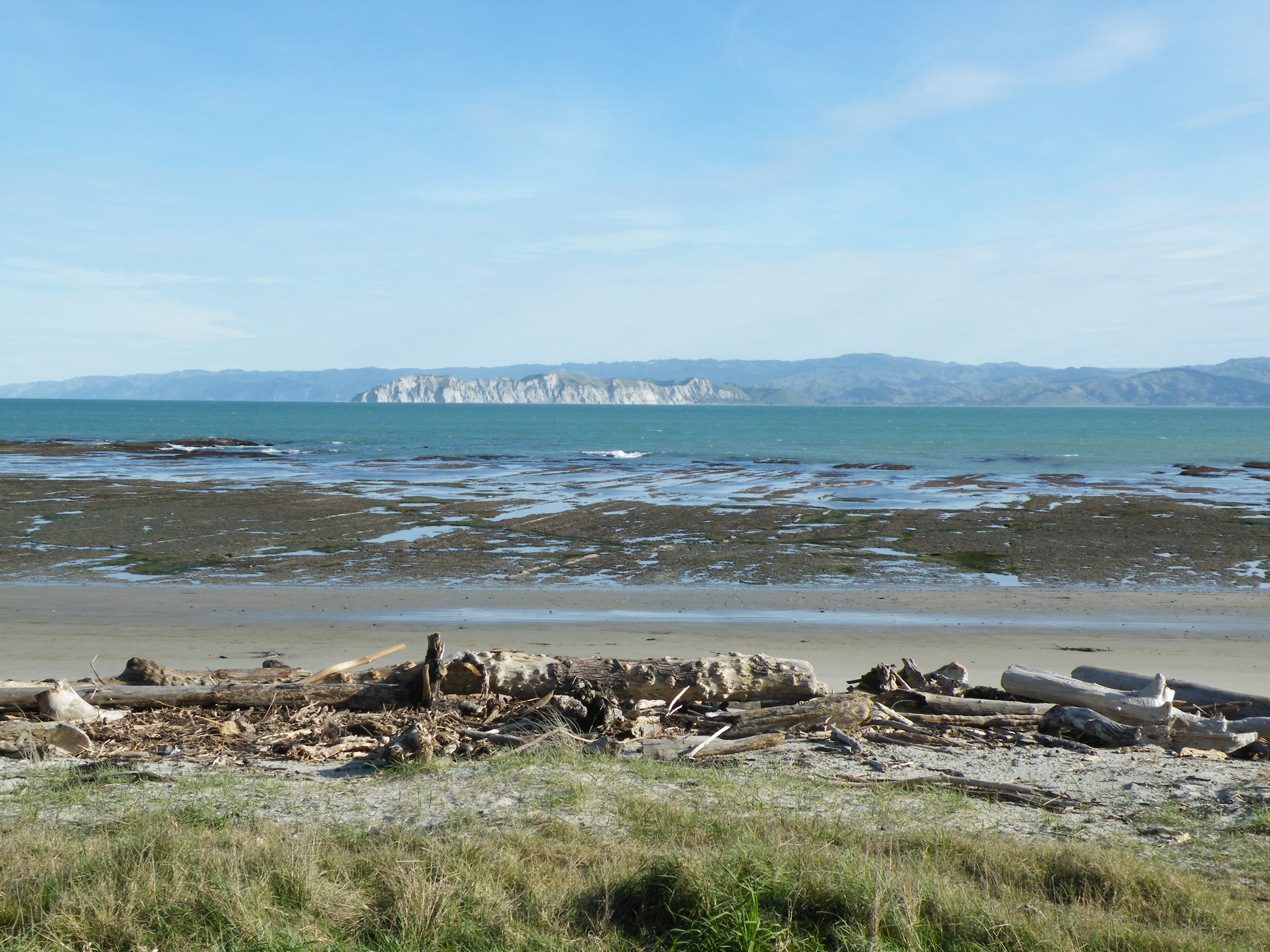
- Young Nick's Head from Kaiti Beach

- Location within New Zealand
- Coordinates: 38.7575°S 177.9712°E
- Location: Tūranganui-a-Kiwa / Poverty Bay, New Zealand

Te Kurī also known as Young Nick's Head (also known as Ngā Pari mā mai rā, Te Kurī o Whata and Te Kurī a Pāoa/Te Kurī a Pawa.) is a prominent headland at the southern entrance to Tūranganui-a-Kiwa (Poverty Bay), on the east coast of New Zealand's North Island.

It occupies an important place in the voyaging traditions of Horouta and Takitimu, and is closely associated with the ancestor Pawa, the captain of the Horouta waka, whose journeys through the district are commemorated in numerous place names along the East Coast.

The headland was named by James Cook's HMS Bark Endeavour expedition in October 1769, from which the English name "Young Nick's Head" was derived from the man that first sighted land.

The settlement of Muriwai, also known as Te Muriwai o Whata is located just inland.

== Name ==
Several traditional Māori names are associated with the headland, reflecting the diversity of traditions preserved by different iwi and hapū. It is most commonly known today as Te Kurī a Pāoa/Te Kurī a Pawa ("The Dog of Pāoa" or Pawa), although Te Kurī, and Te Kurī o Whata were names also used traditionally)

According to one tradition, Pawa (Pāoa) lost his kurī (dog) while travelling along the coast. From the summit of the cliffs he recognised the likeness of his dog in the reefs below, which thereafter became known as Te Kurī a Pāoa. A Ngāti Porou tradition, recorded by Colonel Thomas William Porter, states that the dog was killed by mākutu (sorcery) and transformed into the headland itself. The reefs below the cliffs were also remembered as an important taunga ika (shark fishing ground), while the cliffs themselves are known as Ngā Pari mā mai ra (White cliffs over there), and was named by Kiwa

The origins of the name were already debated during the nineteenth century. An 1865 manuscript attributed to a Ngāti Porou author records that while some authorities maintained the dog belonged to Pāoa, others believed it belonged to Tarawhata and other origins all together. These differing accounts demonstrate that no single explanation was universally accepted among tribal traditions.

Te Kurī was centuries later the first land sighted by the crew of Captain James Cook's ship, Endeavour, dated on Friday, 6 October 1769. Cook promised a reward to the first crewman to sight land and this reward was delivered to 12-year-old Nicholas Young, assistant to the ship's surgeon, in the form of two gallons of rum and the name of a prominent landmark for their own maps.

== Traditional history ==
Te Kurī is closely associated with traditions surrounding the arrival of the Horouta waka. According to Ngāi Tāmanuhiri traditions, Horouta formed part of a wider expedition led by Tamatea Arikinui and voyaged alongside Takitimu.. After Horouta was damaged near Tuaranui-o-Kanawa,

Pawa travelled inland with members of the crew to obtain timber for a replacement haumi and punake. Their journey became associated with several landmarks including Mangatū and Maungahaumi. By the time Pawa returned, Rongokako had already completed repairs to the waka, and the newly fashioned haumi was left at Maungahaumi, whose profile is said to resemble the prow of a canoe.

During this journey the crew were said to have received assistance from the kaitiaki Te Kumi. Kaumatua Rutene Irwin recorded that some members remained at Maungahaumi to observe tikanga associated with conservation, expressing the principle, "Kotahi te rākau me tope, tekau me whakatipu atu" ("Where one tree is cut down, ten more must be planted").

According to Te Kani te Ua When Pawa arrived at a great forest near Manutuke, Pawa lost his dog, and searching for it named it Pīpīwhakaō after the guarded manner in which Pawa quietly called for his lost dog while avoiding the attention of people gathering food in the forest, then continuing south, Pawa climbs onto the Headland Other traditions connect Pawa with the naming of the Waipaoa, Motu, Waikohu, Waiapu and Waioeka rivers. Following the repairs to Horouta, Hinehakirirangi and the other voyagers established some of the earliest kūmara cultivations in the district at Pākōwhai, Manawarū and Arai-te-uru, at Muriwai and Manutuke. Oral traditions also associate Pawa with planting cultivations at Pāpākanui near Muriwai.

== Nicks Head Station ==
Nick's Head Station is a 661 hectare property consisting of the headland and its surrounding coastal, wetland and farming areas. It was listed for sale in November 2000 and in January 2002 New York financier John Griffin entered into a contract to purchase it for $4 million after an attempt by the Ngāi Tāmanuhiri iwi failed through lack of finance.

== Protest ==
In 2002 a proposed overseas purchase generated considerable public attention and protests led by local Māori seeking protection of the culturally significant landscape. Following negotiations, the cliffs, summit and archaeological sites were transferred into public ownership as part of a National Historic Reserve, while the remainder of the station was protected through conservation covenants. Subsequent ecological restoration has included large-scale native revegetation, wetland restoration and the reintroduction of several indigenous species.

Protesting against foreign ownership of the culturally and historically significant land, a group of local Māori led by Tu Wyllie occupied Young Nick's Head and staged protests at Parliament. After negotiations with iwi took place, Finance Minister Michael Cullen announced in August 2002 that "Young Nick's Head will be protected and the cliffs, pā site and peak of Te Kuri gifted into public ownership as part of a purchase deal for Young Nick's Station". Griffin also agreed upon purchasing the land to establish an open covenant through the Queen Elizabeth II National Trust to protect the remainder of the headland area from commercial development.

The station is currently owned by John Griffin. After buying it, he engaged in a long-term plan to restore the area's vegetation and wildlife. More than 600,000 trees were planted, 26 hectares of wetlands were restored, and a 2-metre-high predator-proof fence was constructed as native species such as tuatara, blue penguin and wētā were reintroduced. In 2005 Ecoworks, an ecological restoration company in Gisborne, successfully used solar-powered, acoustic-attraction methods and artificial burrows to establish breeding colonies of six pelagic seabird species at Young Nick's Head which had previously been severely affected by human colonisation and the introduction of new predators.

== Protected Status ==
Under the Ngai Tāmanuhiri Claims Settlement Act 2012, Young Nick's Head/Te Kuri a Paoa Historic Reserve became a national reserve per section 13 of the Reserves Act 1977 and was renamed Te Kuri a Paoa/Young Nick's Head National Historic Reserve.
