= Frances Hodgkins Fellowship =

New Zealand arts residency

The Frances Hodgkins Fellowship, established in 1962, is one of New Zealand's premier arts residencies. The list of past fellows includes many of New Zealand's most notable artists.

== Purpose ==
The position is based at the University of Otago in Dunedin, New Zealand, and is awarded annually, providing studio space and stipend equivalent to a lecturer's salary. The fellowship was created to encourage painters and sculptors in the practice and advancement of their art, to associate them with life in the University, and at the same time to foster an interest in the arts within the University. The award came about through efforts by Charles Brasch. When it was created, it was the only fellowship for the visual arts in New Zealand. The Frances Hodgkins Fellowship is named after the New Zealand painter Frances Hodgkins (1869–1947) who was born in Dunedin.

== Significance ==
New Zealand writer David Eggleton described the fellowship as 'an emblem of cultural endeavour which … holds a legendary status in the public imagination'. The alumni are described as a "who's who of the New Zealand art world". David Bell, the committee convenor in 2017, said "The fellowship has been – and remains – the most prestigious residential award in visual arts practice in New Zealand and, beyond its enrichment of our own local arts scene and the refreshing cycles of change through each year's appointments, the cumulative effect of the residency has been to secure the careers of two generations of professional artists in this country.".

== 50th anniversary ==
In 2017 Otago University Press published a book by Priscilla Pitts and Andrea Hotere to celebrate the 50th anniversary of the fellowship, and held a commemorative exhibition simultaneously at the Dunedin Public Art Gallery and the Hocken Library. The cover of the book features Adam and Eve by Michael Illingworth. Illingworth had become notorious after a controversy the previous year over an Auckland gallery displaying Adam and Eve, which clearly shows the subjects' genitalia. The police ordered the painting's removal but the gallery refused and the district attorney declined to prosecute. Illingworth's selection as the first of the Frances Hodgkins Fellows "reiterated that...the visual arts were an important form of communication founded upon the knowledge of professionals, not the criticisms and opinions of the general public." The exhibition book, UNDREAMED OF...50 Years of the Frances Hodgkins Fellowship has been described as "a fantastic introduction to some pivotal NZ artists". The title is part of a quote from Frances Hodgkins, who wrote the support for the artist was capable of 'yielding up riches – undreamed of'.

== Frances Hodgkins Fellows ==
The artists who have received this award are as follows:

- 1966 Michael Illingworth
- 1967 Tanya Ashken
- 1968 Derek Ball
- 1969 Ralph Hotere
- 1970 Michael Smither
- 1971/1972 Marté Szirmay
- 1973 Ray Thorburn
- 1974 Marilynn Webb
- 1975 John S. Parker
- 1976 Ian Bergquist
- 1977 Jeffrey Harris
- 1978 Grahame Sydney
- 1979 Matthew Pine
- 1980 Andrew Drummond
- 1981 Gretchen Albrecht
- 1982 Chris Booth
- 1983 Joanna Margaret Paul
- 1984 Michael Armstrong
- 1985 Denis O'Connor
- 1986 Ian C. McMillan
- 1987 Kendal Heyes
- 1988 Julia Morison
- 1989 Shona Rapira Davies
- 1990 Siegfried Koglmeier
- 1991 Christine Webster
- 1992 Neil Frazer
- 1993 Peter Gibson Smith
- 1994 Nicola Jackson
- 1995 Jeffrey Thomson
- 1996/1997 Fiona Pardington
- 1998 Shane Cotton
- 1999 Séraphine Pick
- 2000 Jim Speers
- 2001 Ava Seymour
- 2002 Scott Eady
- 2003 Sara Hughes
- 2004 Mladen Buizumic
- 2005 Rohan Wealleans
- 2006 Sarah Munro
- 2007 Ben Cauchi
- 2008 Heather Straka
- 2009 Eddie Clemens
- 2010 Joanna Langford
- 2011 Kushana Bush
- 2012 Nick Austin
- 2013 Zina Swanson
- 2014 Patrick Lundberg
- 2015 John Ward Knox
- 2016 Miranda Parkes
- 2017 Campbell Patterson
- 2018 Louise Menzies
- 2019 Imogen Taylor
- 2020 & 2021 Bridget Reweti
- 2022 Sorawit Songsataya
- 2023 Emily Hartley-Skudder
- 2024 Miranda Bellamy and Amanda Fauteux
- 2025 Reece King

== See also ==
- Robert Burns Fellowship
- Mozart Fellowship
