= Virginia King =

New Zealand sculptor (born 1946)

- Born: 1946 (age 79–80); Kawakawa, New Zealand
- Education: Elam School of Fine Arts
- Awards: Recipient artist: Artists to Antarctica Programme 1999–2000
- Website: https://www.virginiakingsculptor.com

Virginia King (born 1946) is a New Zealand sculptor. She sculpts in wood, metal and stone and is influenced by the natural environment and the forms of leaves, trees, shells, ferns and feathers. King's works can be seen in locations in New Zealand and Australia.

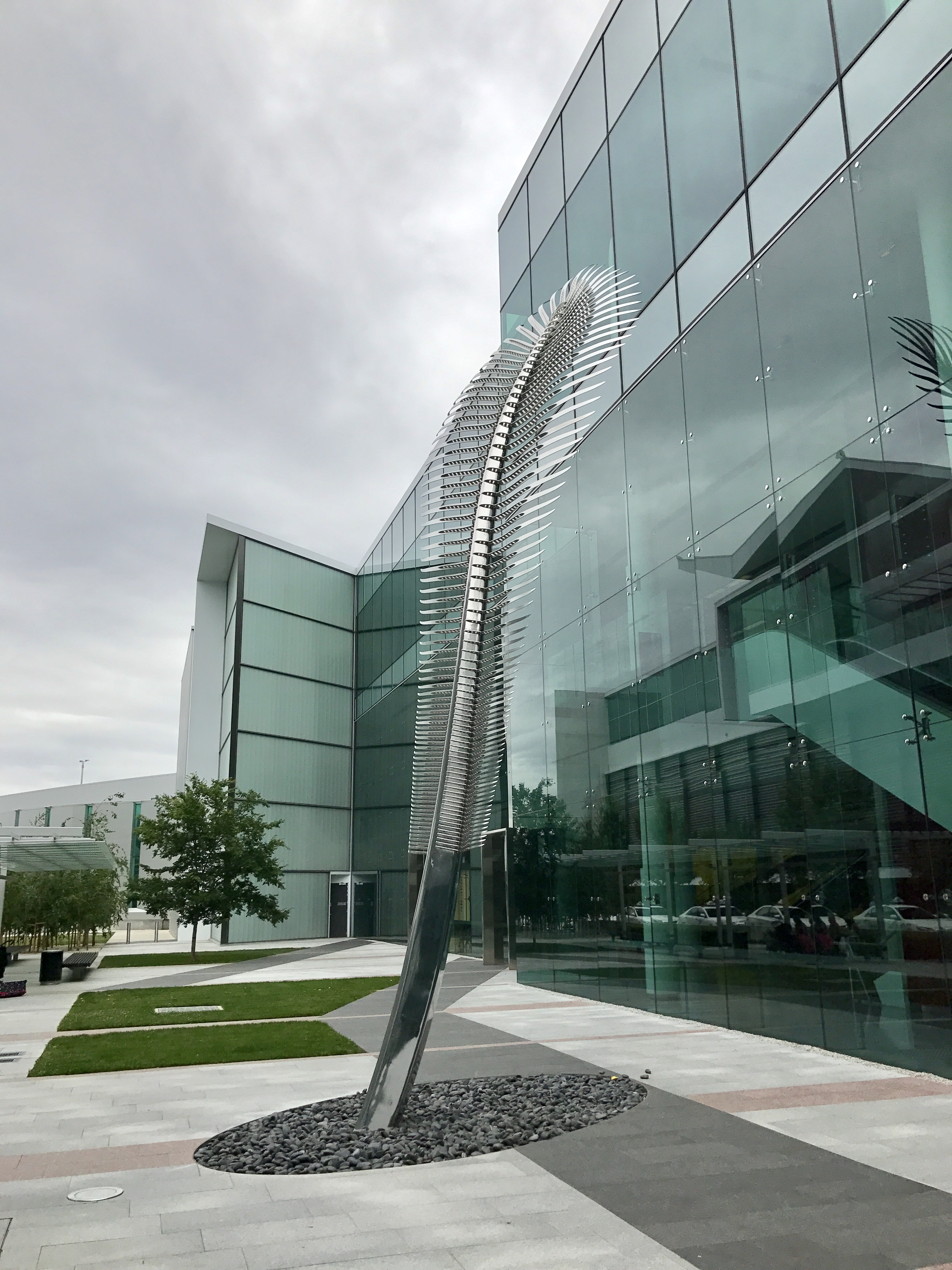
Willinga Plume, Canberra Airport

== Early life and education ==
King was born in 1946 in Kawakawa and attended primary schools in Ōhaeawai, Kerikeri and Paihia and secondary school at Sacred Heart College in Lower Hutt. She studied at the Wellington Polytechnic School of Design in 1963 and the Elam School of Fine Arts at the University of Auckland from 1964 to 1965.

== Career ==
In her early career King worked in painting, print-making and sculpture, and as a fashion designer after attending the Chelsea Art School. From 1988 she concentrated on sculpture working in stone, metal and wood. The natural environment and its preservation is the motivation for her work. King's works are placed in the area of ecological art combining issues of anthropocentrism, environmental ethics, the ecological crisis and the 'feminine' in 'nature'. Her concern for the environment has led her to use demolition kauri to highlight the destruction of New Zealand's kauri forests. Leaves and seedpods, often in symbolic form, have been frequent forms used in her sculptures.

Her installation sculpture Raft (River Styx) (1994) was made of ancient kauri wood pieces roped to a central piece in a herringbone pattern in the form of a fan; it is reminiscent of the rafts of kauri logs floated down rivers from the forests of the northern North Island to the sawmills. The work "draws formal parallels with animal vertebrae, an insect wing, a feather, a fern, a leaf". The reference to the Styx "suggests the raft is the ferry for the dead, in this case destroyed nature".

King has also created land art works. In 1996 she created a sand spiral at Piha Beach, which was inspired by spiral shells. Koru (2002) at the Brick Bay Sculpture Trail was a koru (fern frond) earthwork set beside a lake with walkways to access mounds in the lake.

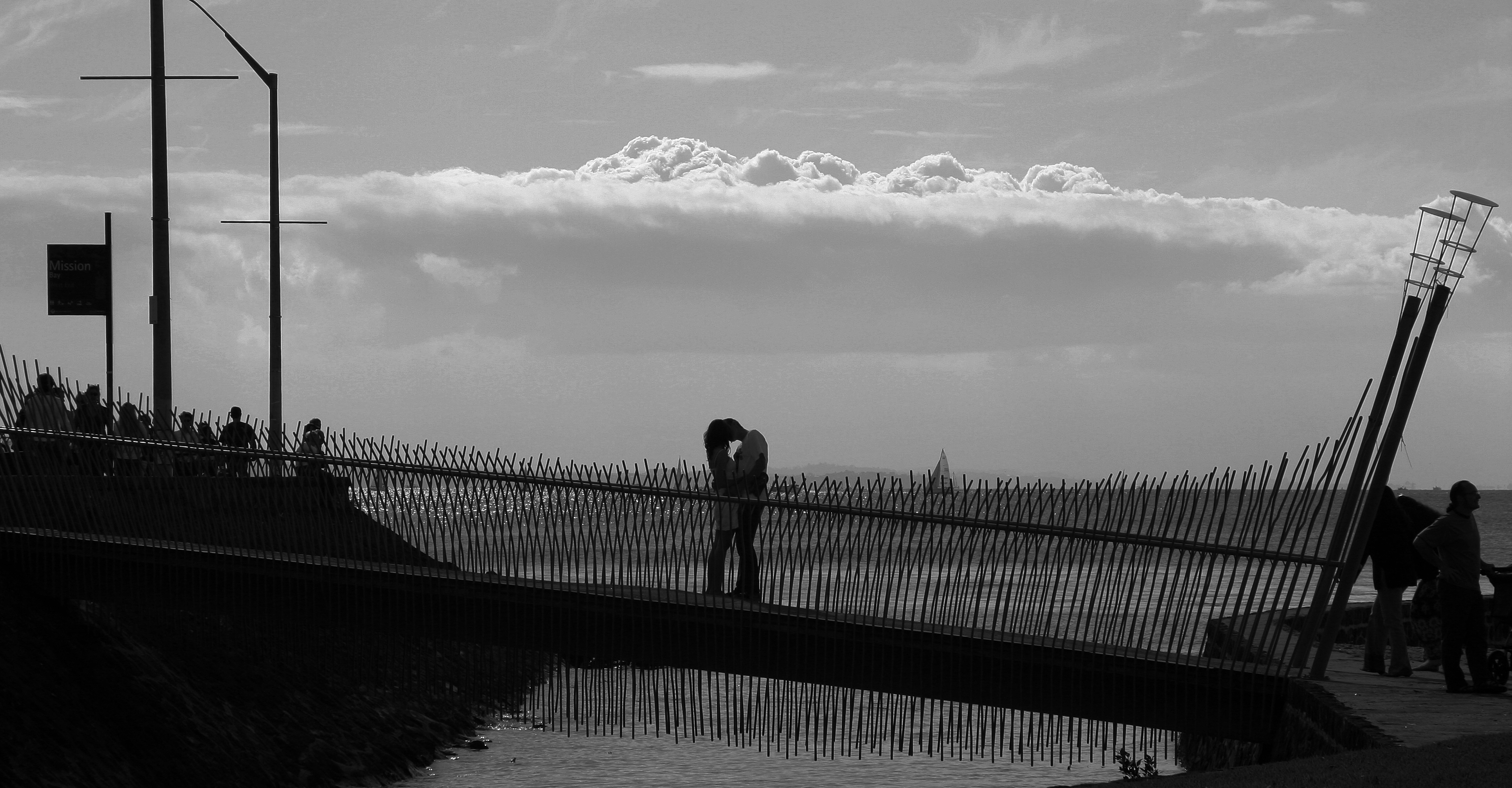
Aramarama Millennium Footbridge. Mission Bay

In 1999 the Whangarei Art Museum presented the exhibition Tideline: sculpture: a ten year survey, curated by the museum Director, Scott Pothan. To mark the millennium King and Chris Thom collaborated to build Aramaramara, the Mission Bay Millennium Footbridge in Auckland.

In 1999 King was one of the artists selected to participate in the Artists to Antarctica Programme, a scheme in which artists visited Antarctica and created works to share their insights and raise public awareness of the continent. She created Antarctic Heart, 21 sculptures of macrocarpa and totara with reflective and luminous surfaces hanging from strings which swivelled in a darkened gallery. The sculpture was accompanied by a sound track which combined the sounds of Weddell seals with the work of composer Chris Cree Brown. King's interest in biology inspired the sculpture which represents the micro organisms and other creatures living and regenerating underwater.

King's works have been shown outside New Zealand. She was commissioned to create a work for the opening of the Jean-Marie Tjibaou Cultural Centre in Nouméa, New Caledonia in 1998. Pacific Star (also the name of a medal awarded to soldiers who served in World War II) was made of recycled wood and other materials and consisted of panels in a star shape which floated on the incoming tide. King was invited to exhibit at the Biennale Collateral exhibition, Personal Structures, in Venice in 2019. She showed a video plus five works: Southern Nautilus, Phantom Fleet, Tangled Infinities, Pacific Radiolaria and Floating Alphabet. The latter consisted of words and letters floating on a canal and was a new version of an earlier work Soul, Language as a Virus.

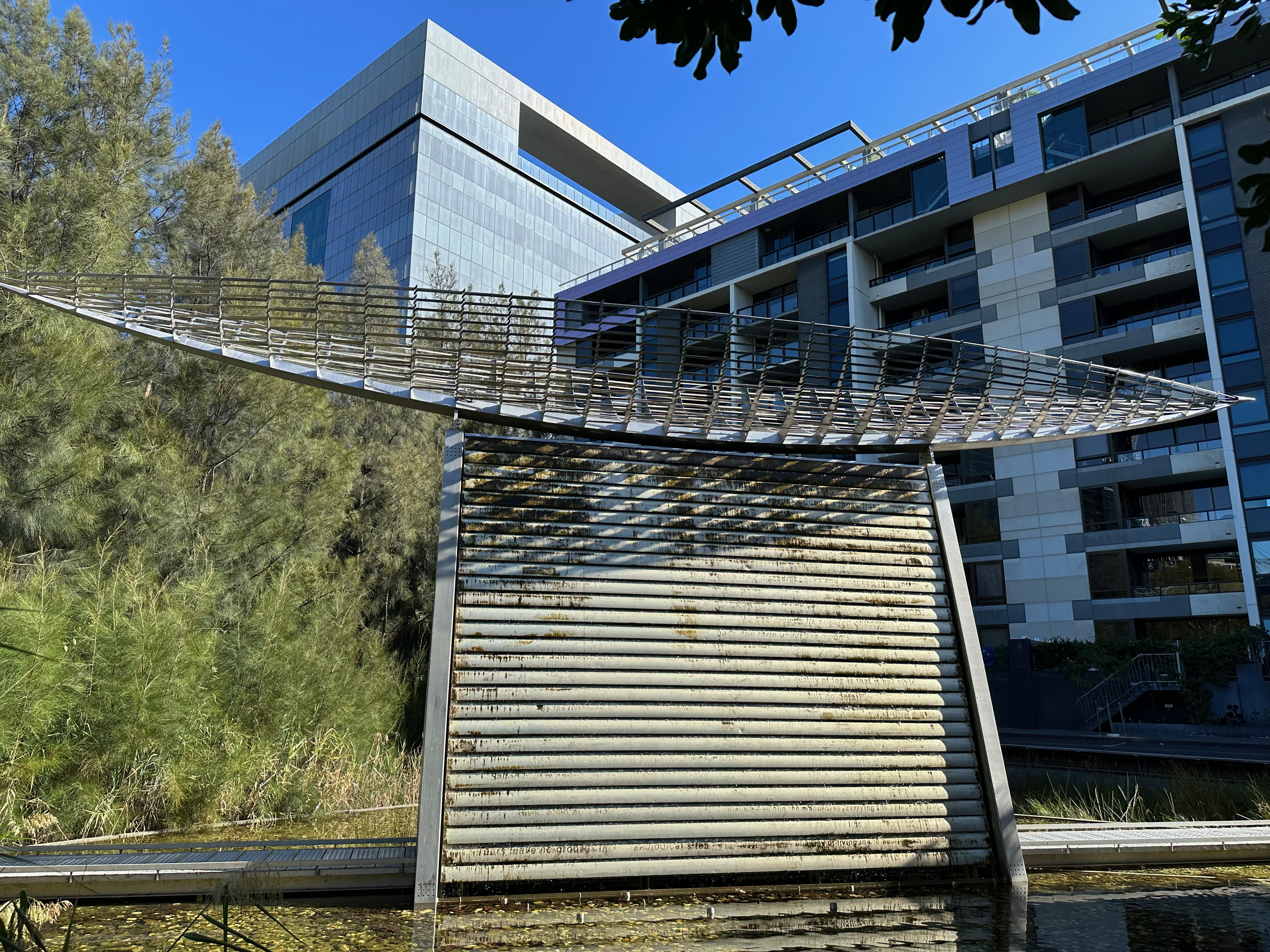
Reed Vessel, Melbourne

Willinga Plume, at Canberra Airport, is a representation of a lyre bird's feather. Reed Vessel (2004), a canoe made of 300 pieces of stainless steel, stands in the Docklands in Melbourne. She has also exhibited at the Tourism New Zealand garden at the Chelsea Flower Show.

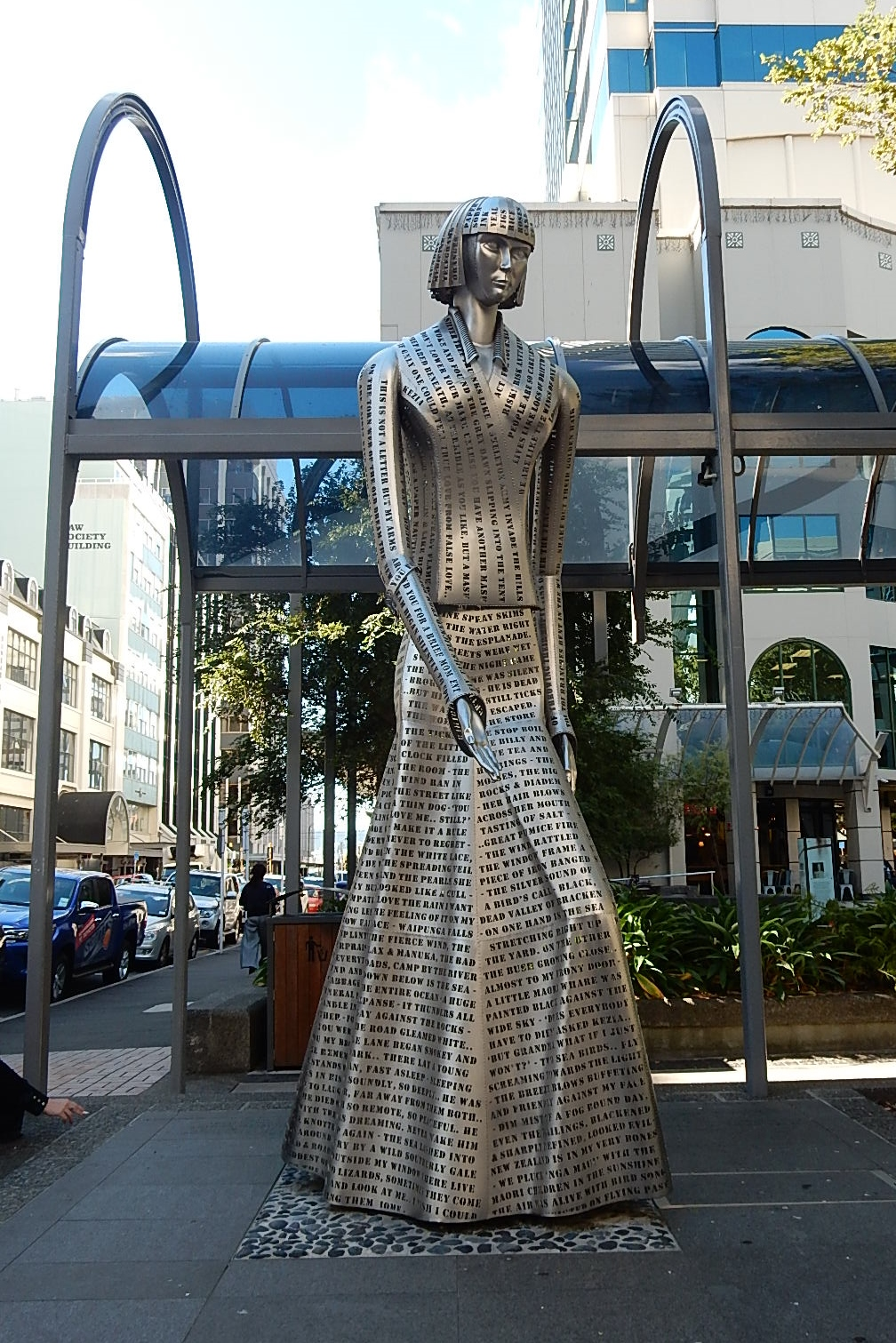
Woman of Words in Midland Park, Wellington

A number of King's sculptures can be found in New Zealand cities. Her sculpture of writer Katherine Mansfield Woman of Words (2013) stands in Midland Park, Lambton Quay in Wellington. Made of stainless steel it is embellished with words from Mansfield's writing. Sliver (2007), a stainless steel 'doughnut' shape, was installed in Newmarket, Auckland in 2008. The David Lange Memorial (2008) in Mason Avenue, Ōtāhuhu is made from stainless steel, steel and timber poles, engraved basalt and landform earthworks. In creating the work King involved the community and Lange's family so that the work (a suspended vessel and 12 columns) includes words from Lange's speeches and acknowledges the use of the narrow Auckland isthmus as a portage used by Māori. It was unveiled by the governor general Sir Anand Satyanand in 2008. Hinaki Guardian (2013) is the form of an eel trap, made of stainless steel and situated in a hole cut into the wharf at Hobsonville part of the Didsbury Art Trail.

Wakatipu Vessel (2015) a stainless steel waka (canoe) in St Omer Park, Queenstown has been regularly 'vandalised' by having traffic cones thrown into it.

King's works can be found at the Brick Bay Sculpture Trail, Snells Beach, north of Auckland and in the sculpture park at Connells Bay on Waiheke Island.

== Gallery ==
David Lange Memorial, Ōtāhuhu, Auckland

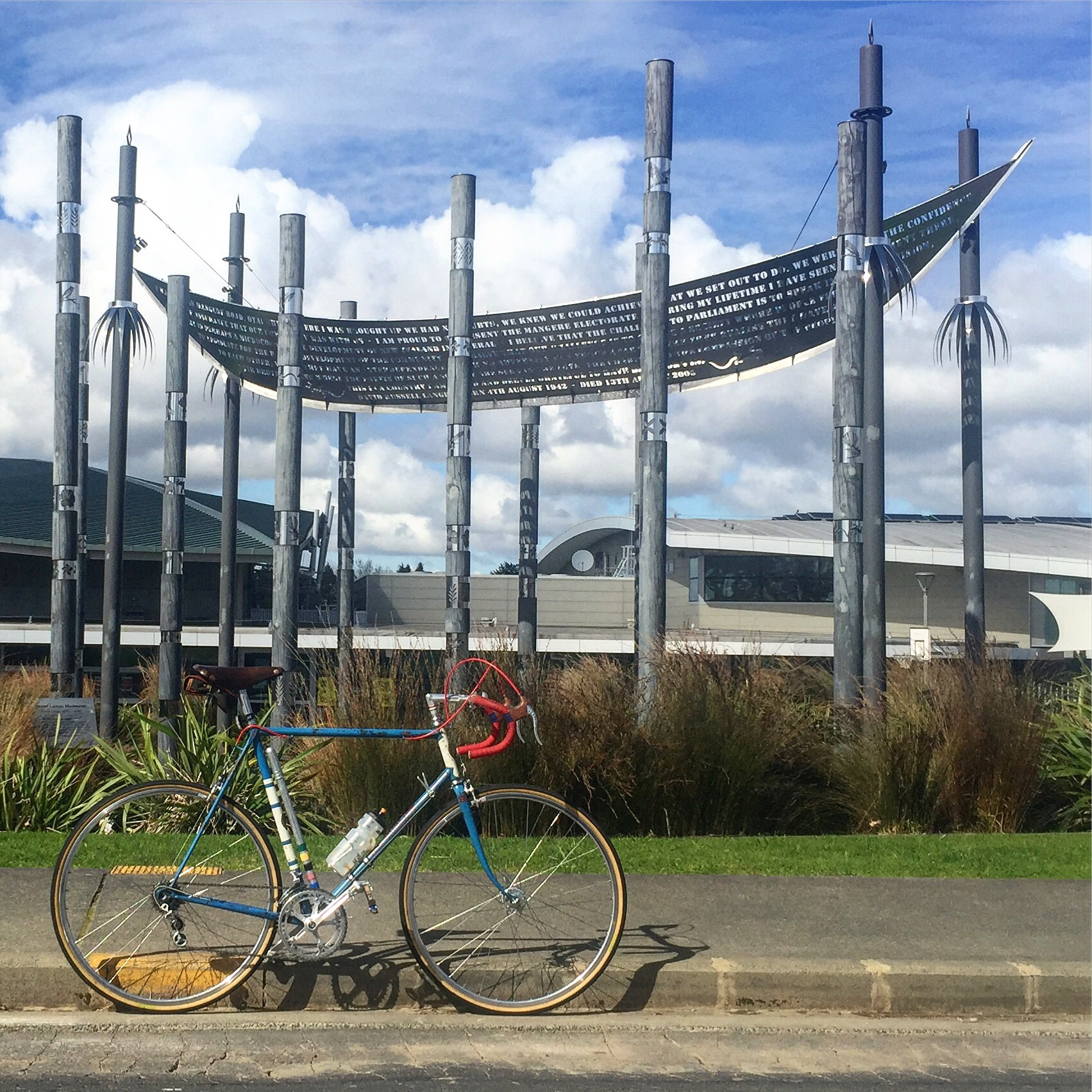

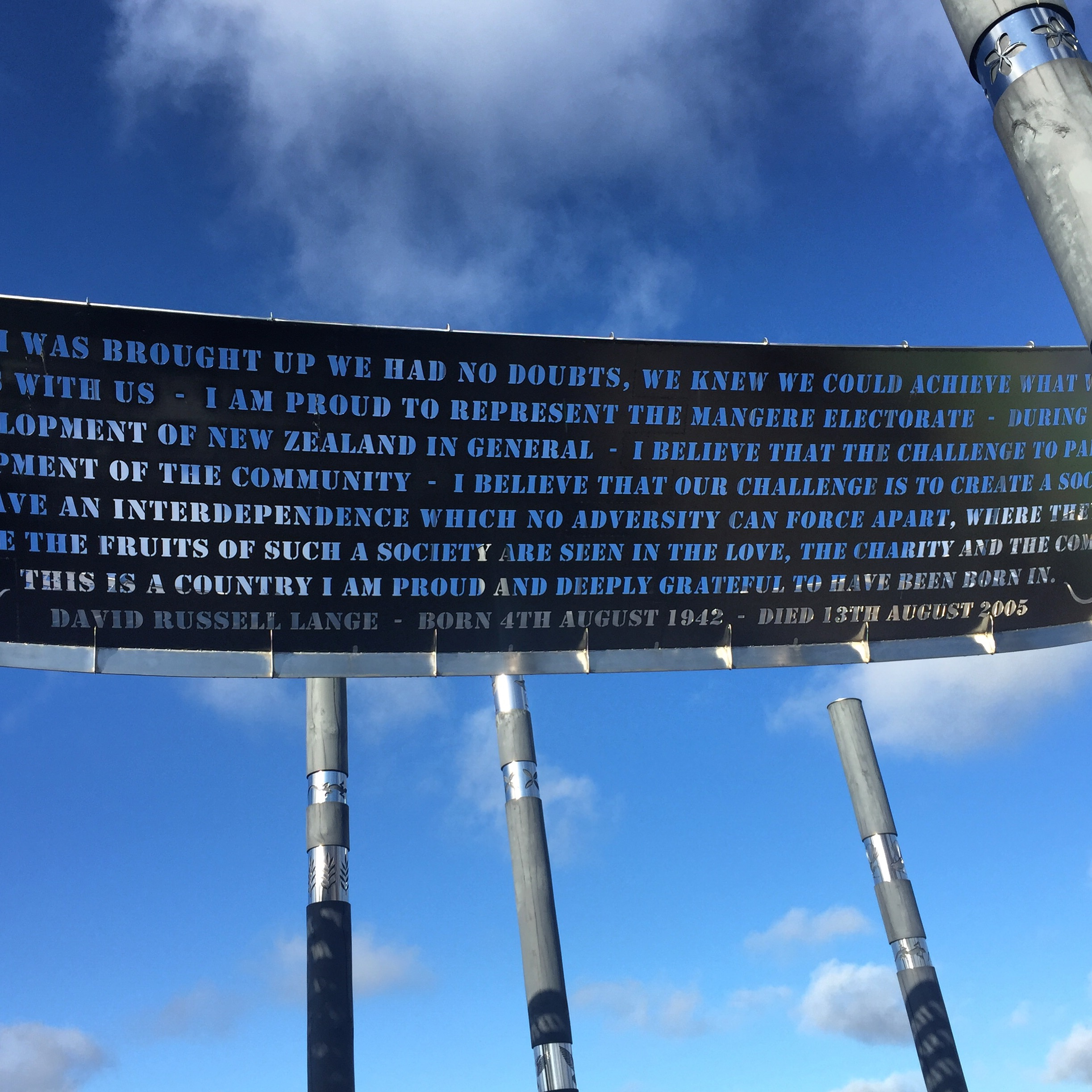

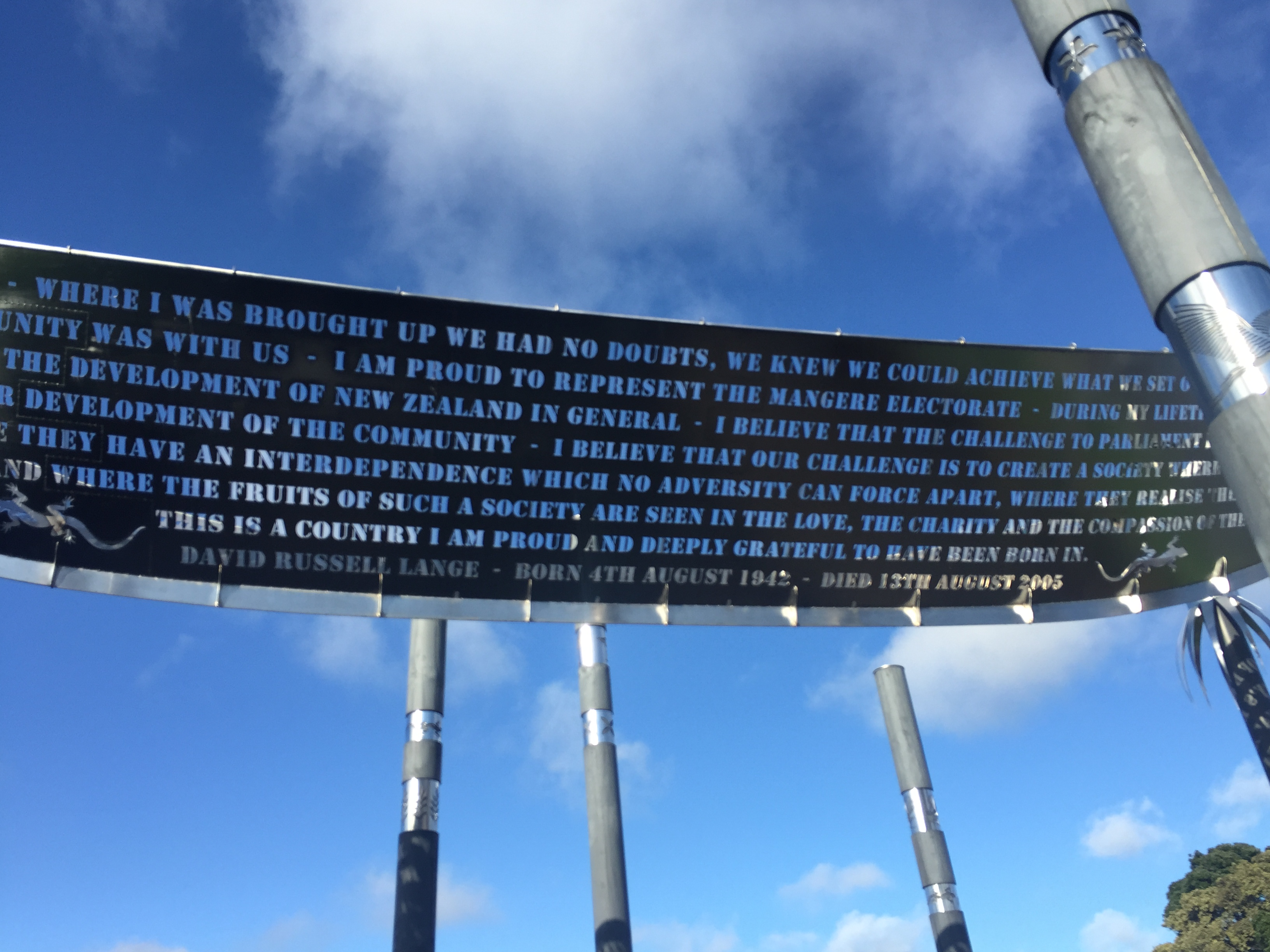

== Personal life ==
King is married to architect Michael King and they have three children.

She lives and works in Auckland and Waiheke Island.

== Publications ==
=== Books ===
- King V. (1995). Raft (River Styx) (2nd ed.). V. King. OCLC 154176112
- King, Virginia (2001). Antarctic heart. Auckland, N.Z.: V. King. ISBN 0-473-07731-0. OCLC 155649401.
- Pothan, Scott (1999). Tideline: sculpture: a ten year survey. Whangarei, New Zealand: Whangarei Art Museum.

=== Videos ===
- King, Virginia & Chris Cree Brown (2001). Antarctic heart : Virginia King Artists to Antarctica programme 1999-2000. OCLC 155719195 Art video by King of electron microscope images, sculptures and the Antarctic landscape with music by Cree Brown.
