= Geoff Thomson =

Australian cricketer (born 1959)

Personal information
- Full name: Geoffrey David Thomson
- Born: 21 April 1959 (age 67); Subiaco, Western Australia
- Batting: Right-handed
- Bowling: Right-arm fast-medium

Domestic team information
- Years: Team
- 1982/83: Western Australia

Career statistics
Competition	FC
Matches	1
Runs scored	0
Batting average	–
100s/50s	–
Top score	–
Balls bowled	162
Wickets	0
Bowling average	–
5 wickets in innings	–
10 wickets in match	–
Best bowling	–
Catches/stumpings	0/–
- Source: ESPNcricinfo, 20 January 2022

Geoffrey David Thomson (born 21 April 1959) is a former Australian cricketer. He played one first-class match for Western Australia in 1982/83.
